= Little River (Maine) =

Little River (Maine) may refer to one of the following rivers in the U.S. state of Maine:

- Little River (Androscoggin River tributary)
- Little River (Big Lake)
- Little River (Casco Bay)
- Little River (Damariscotta River tributary)
- Little River (Drakes Island, Maine)
- Little River (Fish River tributary)
- Little River (Georgetown, Maine)
- Little River (Goosefare Bay) in Biddeford/Kennebunkport
- Little River (Kennebec River tributary)
- Little River (Ossipee River tributary)
- Little River (Passamaquoddy Bay)
- Little River (Penobscot Bay)
- Little River (Pleasant River tributary)
- Little River (Presumpscot River tributary)
- Little River (Salmon Falls River tributary)
- Little River (York, Maine)
