= List of rivers of Maine =

A map of Maine

This is a list of rivers in Maine.

== Saint John River ==
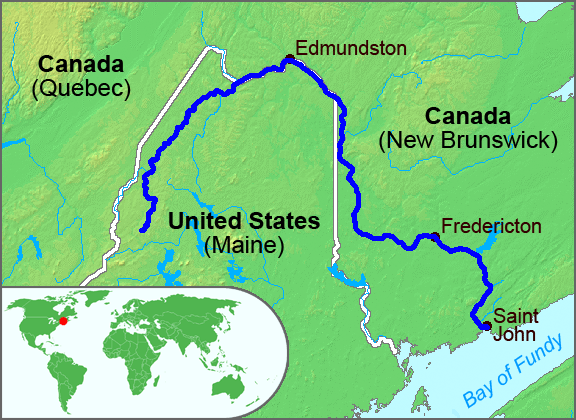
Saint John River (Maine and New Brunswick)

Note: Higher part of Saint John River is recuperating water from tributaries of Southeast Quebec

Left bank of Saint John River (Maine)

- Saint John River
  - Southwest Branch Saint John River, Quebec and Maine
    - Little Southwest Branch Saint John River
    - Baker Branch Saint John River
  - Northwest Branch Saint John River
    - Daaquam River, Quebec and Maine
  - Big Black River in Maine (Grande rivière Noire in Québec)
    - Depot River
      - Brown River, Quebec and Maine
    - Gobeil River, Quebec and Maine
    - Shields Branch in Maine (rivière du Rochu in Quebec)
    - Fivemile Brook in Maine (Rivière des Cinq Milles in Quebec)
    - Twomile Brook in Maine (Rivière des Deux Milles in Quebec)
      - Little Saint Roch River
    - Chimenticook River, Maine
    - East Lake (Kamouraska), Quebec and Maine
    - Pocwock River, Quebec and Maine
      - Pocwock River West Branch, Quebec and Maine
      - Pocwock River East Branch, Maine
  - Little Black River in Maine (Rivière Noire in Quebec)
    - West Branch Little Black River, Quebec and Maine
    - Campbell Branch Little Black River, Quebec and Maine
  - St. Francis River in Maine (rivière Saint-François in Quebec)

Right bank of Saint John River (Maine)

- Saint John River
  - Allagash River
    - Musquacook Stream
  - Fish River
    - Red River
    - Birch River
      - North Branch Birch River
      - South Branch Birch River
    - Little River
  - Aroostook River
    - St. Croix Stream
      - Blackwater River
        - North Branch Blackwater River
        - South Branch Blackwater River
    - Machias River
      - South Branch Machias River
    - Little Machias River
    - Little Madawaska River
  - River De Chute
  - Meduxnekeag River
    - South Branch Meduxnekeag River
    - North Branch Meduxnekeag River

== Down East ==
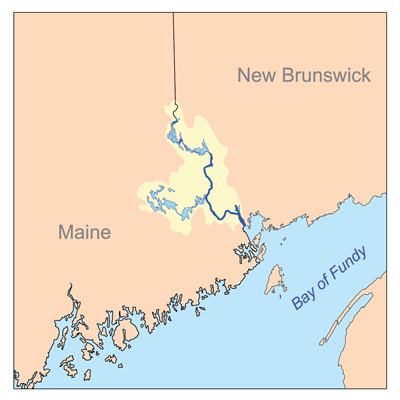
St. Croix River watershed

- St. Croix River
  - Little River (Big Lake)
- Little River (Passamaquoddy Bay)
- Pennamaquan River
- Hardscrabble River
- Dennys River
- Orange River
- Machias River
  - West Branch Machias River
  - Crooked River
  - Middle River
  - East Machias River
    - Maine River
- Englishman River
- Chandler River
  - East Branch Chandler River
- Sandy River
- Indian River
  - Southwest Branch Indian River
- West River
- Pleasant River
  - Western Little River
  - Little River
  - West Branch Pleasant River
- Harrington River
- Mill River
- Narraguagus River
  - West Branch Narraguagus River (Hancock County, Maine)
  - Little Narraguagus River
  - West Branch Narraguagus River (Cherryfield, Maine)
    - Spring River
- Skillings River
- Jordan River
- Union River
  - East Branch Union River
    - Bog River
    - Middle Branch Union River
  - West Branch Union River
  - Webb Brook
    - Webb Pond
      - Mill Brook
        - Little Bog River
- Benjamin River

== Penobscot Bay ==
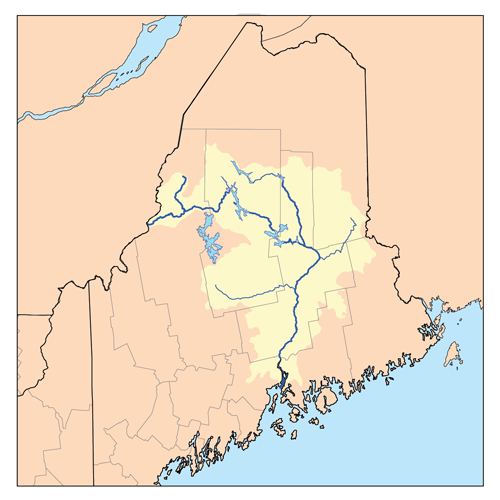
Penobscot River watershed

- Bagaduce River
- Penobscot River
  - East Branch Penobscot River
    - Seboeis River
      - Little Seboeis River
  - West Branch Penobscot River
    - North Branch Penobscot River
    - South Branch Penobscot River
  - Mattawamkeag River
    - East Branch Mattawamkeag River
    - West Branch Mattawamkeag River
    - Molunkus Stream
  - Piscataquis River
    - East Branch Piscataquis River
    - West Branch Piscataquis River
    - Sebec River
    - Pleasant River
      - East Branch Pleasant River
        - Middle Branch Pleasant River
      - West Branch Pleasant River
  - Passadumkeag River
    - East Branch Passadumkeag River
    - West Branch Passadumkeag River
  - Stillwater River
  - Kenduskeag Stream
  - North Branch Marsh River
    - Marsh Stream
  - South Branch Marsh River
  - Orland River
    - Narramissic River
      - Dead River
- Goose River (Belfast Bay)
- Passagassawakeag River
- Little River
- Ducktrap River
- Megunticook River
- Goose River (Rockport Harbor)

== Mid Coast ==
- Weskeag River
- St. George River
  - Dead River
  - Back River (Saint George River tributary)
  - Oyster River
    - West Branch Oyster River
    - East Branch Oyster River
  - Mill River
- Meduncook River
  - Back River (Meduncook River tributary)
- Medomak River
  - Back River (Medomak River tributary)
  - Goose River
- Pemaquid River
- Johns River
  - Eastern Branch Johns River
  - North Branch Johns River
- Damariscotta River
  - Little River (Damariscotta River tributary)
- Sheepscot River
  - West Branch Sheepscot River
  - Dyer River
  - Marsh River
  - Cross River
  - Back River (Boothbay, Maine)
  - Sasanoa River – connects to Kennebec River
  - Little Sheepscot River
- Little River (Georgetown, Maine)

== Kennebec River ==
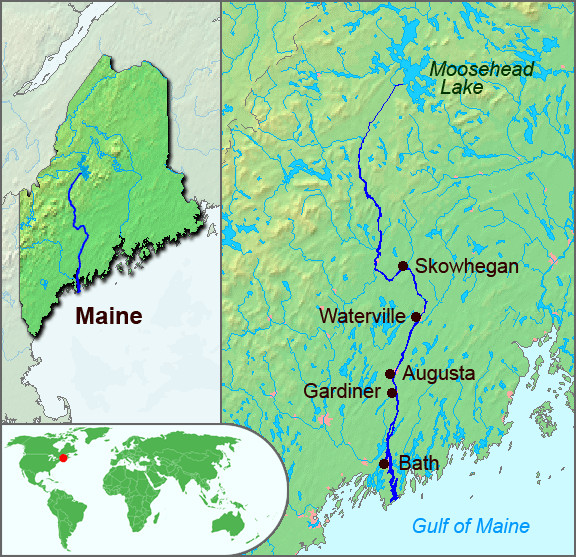
Kennebec River

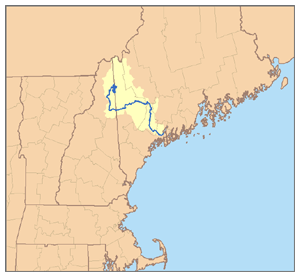
Androscoggin River watershed

- Kennebec River
  - Moose River
    - South Branch Moose River
      - East Branch Moose River
      - West Branch Moose River
  - Roach River
  - Moxie Stream
  - Dead River – also called West Branch
    - North Branch Dead River
    - South Branch Dead River
  - Carrabassett River
    - South Branch Carrabassett River
    - West Branch Carrabassett River
  - Sandy River
    - South Branch Sandy River
    - Lemon Stream
    - Temple Stream
  - Sebasticook River
    - East Branch Sebasticook River
  - Little River
  - Eastern River
    - East Branch Eastern River
    - West Branch Eastern River
  - Abagadasset River
  - Androscoggin River
    - Rapid River
      - Cupsuptic River
        - East Branch Cupsuptic River
        - Little East Branch Cupsuptic River
      - Kennebago River
      - Rangeley River
    - Magalloway River
      - West Branch Magalloway River
        - Third East Branch Magalloway River
      - Second East Branch Magalloway River
      - First East Branch Magalloway River
      - Little Magalloway River
        - Middle Branch Little Magalloway River
        - West Branch Little Magalloway River
    - Dead Cambridge River
      - Swift Cambridge River
    - Wild River
    - Pleasant River
      - East Branch Pleasant River
      - West Branch Pleasant River
    - Alder River
    - Sunday River
      - South Branch Sunday River
    - Bear River
    - Ellis River
      - West Branch Ellis River
    - Concord River
    - Swift River
      - West Branch Swift River
      - East Branch Swift River
    - Webb River
    - Dead River (Androscoggin River tributary)
    - Nezinscot River
      - East Branch Nezinscot River
      - West Branch Nezinscot River
    - Little Androscoggin River
      - Sanborn River
    - Sabattus River
      - Dead River (Sabattus River tributary)
    - Little River
    - Muddy River
    - Cathance River
  - Sasanoa River – connects to Sheepscot River
  - Back River (Kennebec River tributary) (connects to Sheepscot River tributary)

== Southern Maine ==
- Morse River
- Sprague River
- New Meadows River
- Little River
- Harraseeket River
- Royal River
  - Cousins River
- Presumpscot River
  - Tenny River
  - Songo River
    - Bear River
    - Chute River
    - Crooked River
  - Muddy River
  - Northwest River
  - Sticky River
  - Pleasant River
  - Little River
    - North Branch Little River
  - Piscataqua River
    - East Branch Piscataqua River
- Fore River
  - Stroudwater River
    - South Branch Stroudwater River
- Spurwink River
- Scarborough River
  - Dunstan River
  - Nonesuch River
  - Libby River

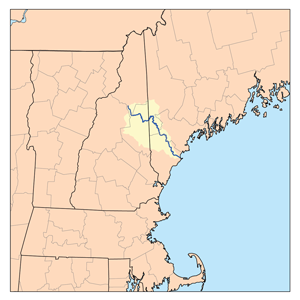
Saco River watershed

- Saco River
  - Old Course Saco River
    - Charles River
      - Cold River
        - Mad River
          - Middle Branch Mad River
          - South Branch Mad River
        - Little Cold River
    - Kezar River
  - Little Saco River
  - Shepards River
  - Tenmile River
    - West Branch Tenmile River
  - Hancock Brook
  - Ossipee River
    - South River
    - Little River (Ossipee River tributary)
  - Little Ossipee River
- Little River (Goosefare Bay)
- Batson River
- Kennebunk River
- Mousam River
  - Middle Branch Mousam River
    - Littlefield River
- Little River (Drakes Island, Maine)
  - Merriland River
- Webhannet River
- Ogunquit River
- Josias River
- Cape Neddick River
- Little River (York, Maine)
- York River
- Piscataqua River
  - Salmon Falls River – also called Newichawannock by the Abenaki
    - Little River (Salmon Falls River tributary)
    - Great Works River
      - Neoutaquet River

== See also ==
- List of lakes in Maine
