= Dead River =

Dead River may refer to:

== United States ==
=== Florida ===
- Dead River (Lake County, Florida)
- Dead River, tributary of the Choctawhatchee River
- Dead River, tributary of the Hillsborough River (Florida)
- Dead River, tributary of the Kissimmee River
- Dead River, tributary of the Ochlockonee River

=== Maine ===
- Dead River (Androscoggin River)
- Dead River (Kennebec River)
- Dead River (Narramissic River)
- Dead River (Sabattus River)
- Dead River (Saint George River)

=== Minnesota ===
- Dead River (Burntside River)
- Dead River (Otter Tail River)

=== Other states ===
- Dead River (Michigan)
- Dead River (New Hampshire)
- Dead River (New Jersey)
- Dead River (Oregon)

== England ==
- Dead River (River Mole), tributary of the River Mole

== See also ==
- The Dead River, Jakov Xoxa's novel
- Dead River (film), a 2012 Namibian film
- Campbells Dead River, in Santa Rosa County, Florida
- Dead River Marsh, in Lake Griffin State Park
- Hontoon Dead River, tributary of the St. Johns River
- Jernigan Dead River, in Escambia County, Florida
- Norris Dead River, tributary of the St. Johns River
- River of the dead (disambiguation)
