= Maine River (Maine) =

Location
- Country: United States

Physical characteristics
- Source
  - location: Maine
- Mouth
  - location: Crawford Lake
  - coordinates: 45°04′59″N 67°34′48″W
  - elevation: 130 feet (40 m)
- Length: 5.5 mi (8.9 km)

Basin features
- Progression: Crawford Lake — East Machias River — Machias River — Machias Bay

The Maine River is a short river in Washington County, Maine. From the outlet of Pocomoonshine Lake (45°07′33″N 67°32′50″W) in Princeton, it runs 5.5 miles (8.9 km) southwest to Crawford Lake in Plantation No. 21. The outlet of Crawford Lake is the East Machias River, flowing to Machias Bay.

== See also ==
- List of rivers of Maine
