= North Branch Little River (Maine) =

Coordinates: 43.71286°N 70.45727°W

Location
- Country: United States

Physical characteristics
- Source
  - location: Maine

The North Branch Little River is a 9.8-mile-long (15.8 km) tributary of the Little River in southern Maine. It is part of the Presumpscot River watershed, which flows to Casco Bay in the Atlantic Ocean.

The North Branch rises near the center of the town of Standish in Cumberland County and flows east, crossing into Gorham. It continues east and then turns southeast, joining the Little River 4.4 miles (7.1 km) upstream of that river's mouth at the Presumpscot River.

== See also ==
- List of rivers of Maine
