= East Branch Swift River (Maine) =

Coordinates: 44.74034°N 70.65896°W

Location
- Country: United States

Physical characteristics
- Source
  - location: Maine

The East Branch Swift River is a 10.2-mile-long (16.4 km) tributary of the Swift River in western Maine. Via the Swift River, it is part of the Androscoggin River watershed, which flows to the Kennebec River and ultimately the Atlantic Ocean.

== See also ==
- List of rivers of Maine
