= West Branch Narraguagus River =

West Branch Narraguagus River may refer to:

- West Branch Narraguagus River (Cherryfield, Maine)
- West Branch Narraguagus River (Hancock County, Maine)
