= South Branch Sunday River =

Coordinates: 44.48200°N 70.95619°W

Location
- Country: United States

Physical characteristics
- Source
  - location: Maine

The South Branch Sunday River is a 2.5-mile-long (4.0 km) mountain stream in western Maine. It is a tributary of the Sunday River, which flows to the Androscoggin River and ultimately to the Kennebec River and the Atlantic Ocean.

The South Branch rises on the northern slopes of Bear Mountain, an easterly arm of the Mahoosuc Range, and flows north to the Sunday River in its valley at the foot of the Mahoosucs.

== See also ==
- List of rivers of Maine
