= East Branch Piscataqua River =

Coordinates: 43.73341°N 70.28672°W

Location
- Country: United States

Physical characteristics
- Source
  - location: Maine

The East Branch Piscataqua River is a 10.2-mile-long (16.4 km) river in Maine. It is a tributary of the Piscataqua River, which flows to the Presumpscot River and ultimately to Casco Bay.

The East Branch rises between the towns of Yarmouth and North Yarmouth and flows southwest into Cumberland and eventually Falmouth, where it joins the Piscataqua just upstream from that river's mouth at the Presumpscot River.

== See also ==
- List of rivers of Maine
