= West Branch Swift River (Maine) =

Coordinates: 44.75367°N 70.65035°W

Location
- Country: United States

Physical characteristics
- Source
  - location: Maine

The West Branch Swift River is a 6.4-mile-long (10.3 km) tributary of the Swift River in western Maine. Via the Swift River, it is part of the Androscoggin River watershed, flowing to the Kennebec River and ultimately the Atlantic Ocean.

The West Branch rises in a high valley between Elephant Mountain and Old Blue Mountain and flows east into the town of Byron, reaching the Swift River just south of the village of Houghton.

== See also ==
- List of rivers of Maine
