= Englishman (disambiguation) =

Englishman refers to an English person.

Englishman may also refer to:

== People ==
- Jason Englishman, Canadian rock music singer and guitarist
- Jenny-Bea Englishman, real name of the Canadian singer Esthero
- Erald Briscoe, reggae musician who records under the name Englishman
- Carlos Babington (born 1949), Argentine former football striker known as "El Inglés" (the Englishman)

== Places ==
- Englishman Bay, Washington County, Maine, United States
- Englishman River, Vancouver Island, British Columbia, Canada
- Englishman River (Maine), Washington County, Maine, United States

== Other uses ==
- Englishman (album), by Barrington Levy
- Korean Englishman, YouTube channel

== See also ==
- Anglicus (disambiguation) (Latin: the Englishman), a list of people so named
