= Machias =

Machias may refer to:

== Places ==
- Machias, Maine, a New England town
  - Machias (CDP), Maine, the main village within the town
  - East Machias, Maine
- Machias Bay, in Washington County, Maine
- Machias River (Aroostook River tributary) in northern Maine
- Machias River in eastern Maine
- Machias Seal Island, an island in the Gulf of Maine
- Machias, New York, a town
  - Machias (CDP), New York, the main hamlet within the town
- Machias, Washington, a census-designated place

== Ships ==
- USS Machias, the name of more than one United States Navy ship

== See also ==
- Machia (disambiguation)
