= Dead River (Narramissic River tributary) =

Coordinates: 44.59119°N 68.70364°W

Location
- Country: United States

Physical characteristics
- Source
  - location: Maine

The Dead River is a 1.8-mile-long (2.9 km) arm of Alamoosook Lake in the town of Orland in Hancock County, Maine, United States. Via Alamoosook Lake, the Narramissic River, and the Orland River, it is part of the Penobscot River watershed. It is formed by the junction of Moosehorn Stream and Hothole Stream and extends south to the main body of Alamoosook Lake.

== See also ==
- List of rivers of Maine
