= Sandy River (Chandler Bay) =

Location
- Country: United States

Physical characteristics
- Source
  - location: Jonesport, Maine
- Mouth
  - location: Chandler Bay
  - coordinates: 44°34′39″N 67°34′04″W
  - elevation: sea level
- Length: about 1 mile (1.6 km)

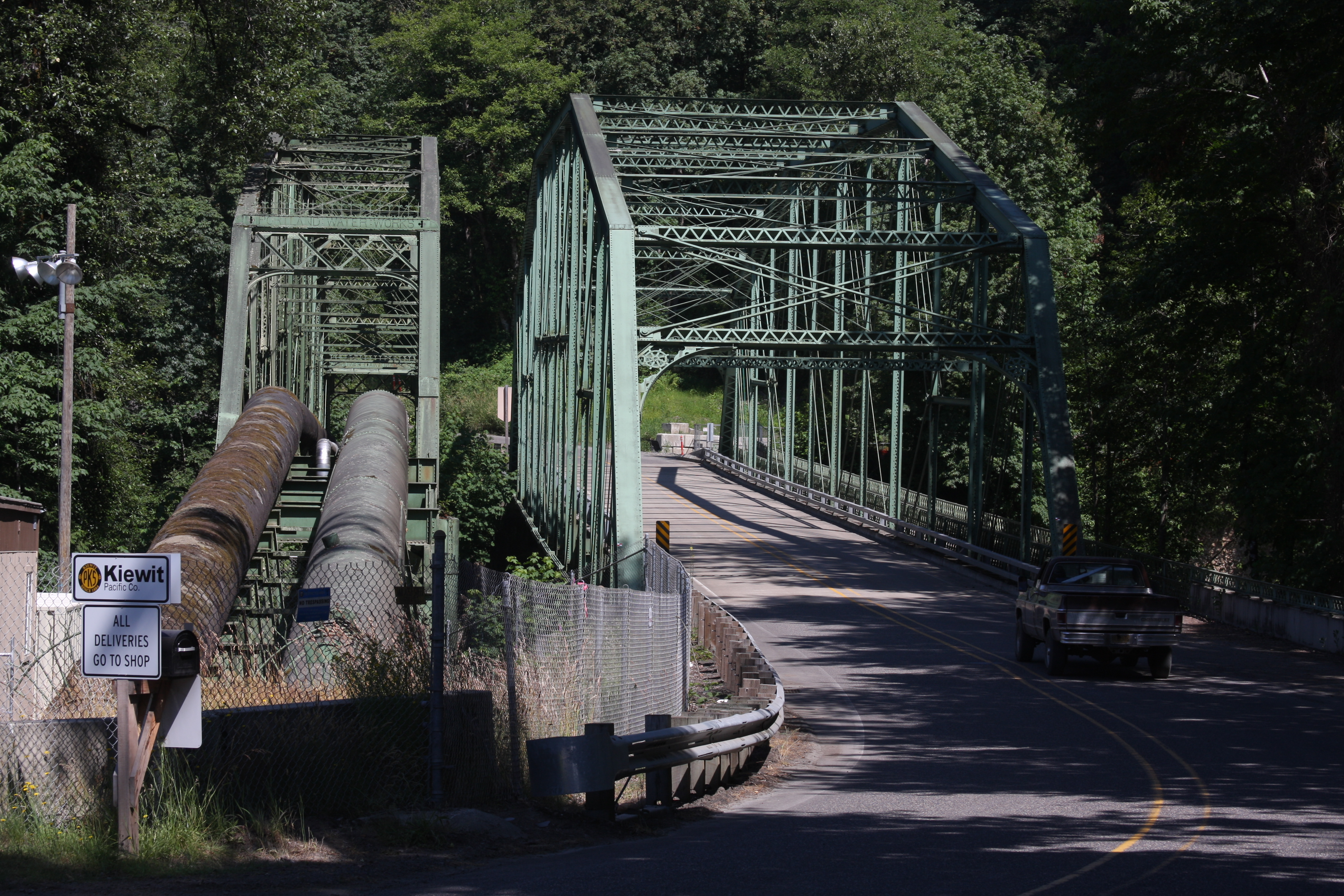

The Sandy River is a very short river in Jonesport, Maine. From its source (44°35′02″N 67°34′39″W), the river runs about 1 mile southeast to the coast of Chandler Bay.

== See also ==
- List of rivers of Maine
