= Spring River (Maine) =

Location
- Country: United States

Physical characteristics
- Source
  - location: Maine
- Mouth
  - location: West Branch Narraguagus River
  - coordinates: 44°41′21″N 68°04′54″W
  - elevation: 145 feet (40 m)
- Length: 4 mi (6.4 km)

The Spring River is a short stream in Township 16, MD, Hancock County, Maine, USA. From the outflow of Narraguagus Lake (44°40′04″N 68°07′59″W), the river runs 4.0 miles (6.4 km) northeast to its confluence with the West Branch Narraguagus River.

== See also ==
- List of rivers of Maine
