= Little Machias River =

River in Maine, United States

Location
- Country: United States

Physical characteristics
- Source
  - location: Maine
- Mouth
  - location: Machias River
  - coordinates: 46°39′07″N 68°25′19″W
  - elevation: 530 feet (160 m)

Basin features
- Progression: Machias — Aroostook — St. John — Bay of Fundy

The Little Machias River is a 17.7-mile-long (28.5 km) river in Maine. From its source (46°43′39″N 68°37′36″W) in Maine Township 12, Range 7, WELS, it runs about 8 miles (13 km) east to Little Machias Lake and about 9 miles (14 km) southeast to its confluence with the Aroostook River in Ashland, 2.4 miles (3.9 km) downstream (north) of the confluence of the Machias River with the Aroostook. Via the Aroostook River, it is part of the Saint John River watershed.

== See also ==
- List of rivers of Maine
