= West Branch Pleasant River (Pleasant River tributary) =

Coordinates: 44.36645°N 70.84868°W

Location
- Country: United States

Physical characteristics
- Source
  - location: Maine

The West Branch Pleasant River is a 7.5-mile-long (12.1 km) tributary of the Pleasant River in the U.S. state of Maine. It is part of the Androscoggin River watershed, which flows to the tidal Kennebec River near its mouth at the Atlantic Ocean.

The river rises at Haystack Notch in the unorganized territory of South Oxford within the White Mountain National Forest and flows northeast, joining the East Branch at the South Oxford-Bethel town line to form the Pleasant River.

== See also ==
- List of rivers of Maine
