= Crooked River (Machias River tributary) =

Location
- Country: United States

Physical characteristics
- Source
  - location: Maine
- Mouth
  - location: Machias River
  - coordinates: 44°55′51″N 67°51′08″W
  - elevation: 195 feet (60 m)
- Length: 11.7 mi (18.8 km)

The Crooked River is an 11.7-mile-long (18.8 km) river in Maine Township 30 MD, BPP, Maine. From its source (44°56′06″N 67°56′48″W), the river runs about 5 miles (8 km) southeast, then winds generally northward to its confluence with the Machias River.

== See also ==
- List of rivers of Maine
