= Sprague River =

Sprague River may refer to:

- Sprague River (Maine), a stream in the U.S. state of Maine
- Sprague River (Oregon), a stream in the U.S. state of Oregon
  - Sprague River, Oregon, a settlement named after the river
