= West Branch Tenmile River =

Coordinates: 43.87507°N 70.92757°W

Location
- Country: United States

Physical characteristics
- Source
  - location: Maine

The West Branch Tenmile River is a 5.0-mile-long (8.0 km) tributary of the Tenmile River in western Maine. It is part of the Saco River watershed, flowing to the Atlantic Ocean.

The West Branch rises near the northern boundary of the town of Porter and flows east, entering the town of Hiram just before its mouth at the Tenmile River.

== See also ==
- List of rivers of Maine
