= Middle River (Maine) =

River in Maine, United States

Location
- Country: United States

Physical characteristics
- Source
  - location: Maine
- Mouth
  - location: Machias River
  - coordinates: 44°43′16″N 67°27′00″W
  - elevation: 5 feet (1.5 m)
- Length: 5.7 mi (9.2 km)

The Middle River is a short river in Washington County, Maine. From the outlet of Marks Lake (44°45′05″N 67°30′41″W) in Marshfield, it runs about 5.7 miles (9.2 km) southeast to the estuary of the Machias River in Machias.

== See also ==
- List of rivers of Maine
