= Spiller Farm Paleoindian Site =

- U.S. National Register of Historic Places
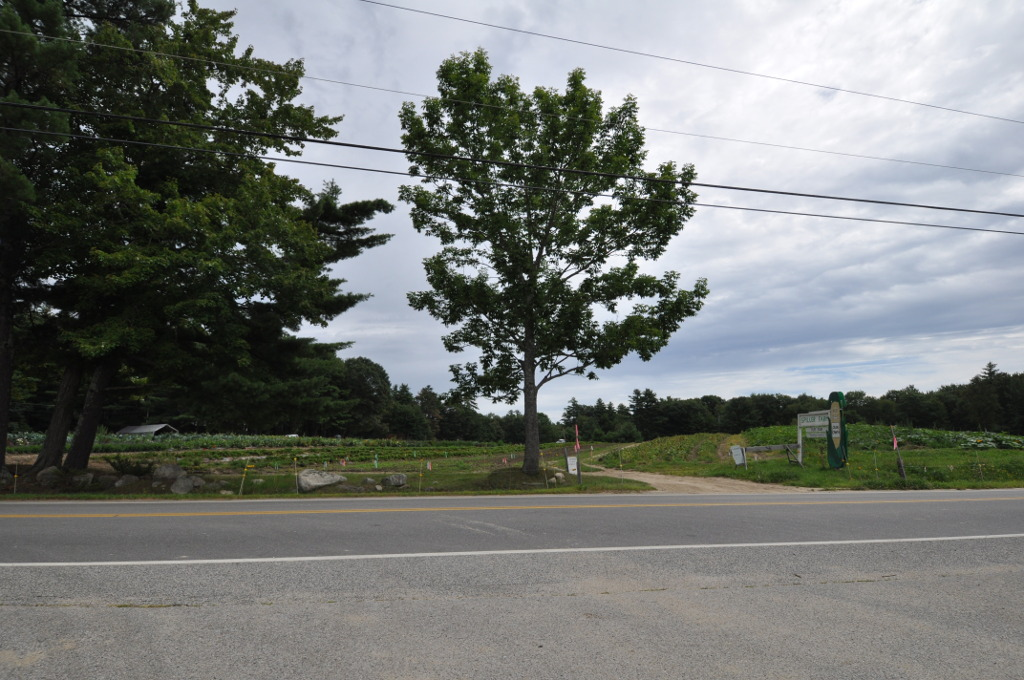
- View of the Spiller Farm property

- Location within Maine Location within the United States
- Nearest city: Wells, Maine
- Coordinates: 43°21′54″N 70°36′18″W
- Area: 60 acres (24 ha)
- MPS: Maine Fluted Point Paleoindian Sites MPS
- NRHP reference No.: 03000922
- Added to NRHP: September 12, 2003

The Spiller Farm Paleoindian Site, designated Site 4.13 by the Maine Archaeological Survey, is a prehistoric archaeological site in Wells, Maine. Located overlooking a stream on the Spiller Farm property on Branch Road, it is an extensive site at which a fine collection of stone artifacts has been found, dating to c. 8,000 BCE. The site was listed on the National Register of Historic Places in 2003.

== Description ==
The Spiller Farm Site is located on the grounds of Spiller Farm, a 60-acre (24 ha) property located inland in northern Wells, near a tributary of the Merriland River. The site was discovered in a plowed field in 1995, and underwent several seasons of excavation thereafter.

The most significant materials found at the site include nearly 300 stone tools. Most of these tools are made from a type of chert that was taken from the Willard Brook Quarry in the interior of central Maine, although some rhyolite materials were found from the Mount Jasper Lithic Source in Berlin, New Hampshire, along with one instance of chalcedony that probably originated in Atlantic Canada. The site is distinct from the nearby Hedden Site in terms of this distribution of stone materials: the latter site has a much more diverse array of sources for its stone materials. Excavation at the site also yielded evidence of at least two hearth features.

== See also ==
- National Register of Historic Places listings in York County, Maine
