= Machia =

Machia may refer to:

- Machia Biological Park, a zoological garden and wildlife conservation facility in Rajasthan, India
- Georges-Andre Machia (born 1988), Cameroonian football player

== See also ==
- Machias (disambiguation)
