= East Machias River =

Location
- Country: United States

Physical characteristics
- Source
  - location: Maine
- Mouth
  - location: Machias River
  - coordinates: 44°42′54″N 67°23′06″W
  - elevation: sea level
- Length: 36 mi (58 km)

The East Machias River is a river in Washington County, Maine. From the outlet of Crawford Lake (45°00′43″N 67°35′12″W) in Crawford, it runs 35.8 miles (57.6 km) southeast to the estuary of the Machias River at the head of Machias Bay. The river mouth is on the border between the towns of East Machias and Machiasport.

== See also ==
- List of rivers of Maine

== Sources ==
- "East Machias River". Geographic Names Information System. United States Geological Survey, United States Department of the Interior. 30 September 1980.
- Maine Streamflow Data from the USGS
- Maine Watershed Data From Environmental Protection Agency
