= Dead River (Sabattus River tributary) =

Coordinates: 45.3004°N 70.1996°W

Location
- Country: United States

Physical characteristics
- Source
  - location: Maine

The Dead River is a 10.3-mile-long (16.6 km) tributary of Sabattus Pond in the U.S. state of Maine. Via the Sabattus River, the outflow of the pond, the Dead River is part of the Androscoggin River watershed, flowing to the Kennebec River and ultimately the Atlantic Ocean.

The Dead River rises in the southern part of the town of Leeds and flows south, passing through the northwest corner of the town of Wales, then flowing through Greene to its outlet at the north end of Sabattus Pond.

Another Dead River joins the Androscoggin River a short distance to the north, in the northern part of Leeds.

== See also ==
- List of rivers of Maine
