= Bear River (Long Lake) =

Coordinates: 44.11146°N 70.68673°W

Location
- Country: United States

Physical characteristics
- Source
  - location: Maine

The Bear River is a 2.7-mile-long (4.3 km) tributary of Long Lake in the U.S. state of Maine. It originates at the outlet of Bear Pond in the town of Waterford in Oxford County, then flows southeast into the town of Bridgton in Cumberland County and finally the town of Harrison, where it reaches Long Lake. Via Long Lake, the Songo River, and Sebago Lake, the Bear River is part of the Presumpscot River watershed, flowing to Casco Bay on the Atlantic Ocean.

== See also ==
- List of rivers of Maine
