= East Branch Pleasant River (Pleasant River tributary) =

Coordinates: 44.36507°N 70.84146°W

Location
- Country: United States

Physical characteristics
- Source
  - location: Maine

The East Branch Pleasant River is a 6.2-mile-long (10.0 km) tributary of the Pleasant River in the U.S. state of Maine. The Pleasant River is a tributary of the Androscoggin River, which flows southeast to the tidal Kennebec River and the Atlantic Ocean.

The East Branch rises in the White Mountain National Forest on the north slopes of a high ridge connecting Miles Notch and Farwell Mountain. The stream flows northeast, then north, into the town limits of Bethel, where it joins the West Branch to form the Pleasant River.

== See also ==
- List of rivers of Maine
