= Sanborn River =

Location
- Country: United States

Physical characteristics
- Source
  - location: Maine
- Mouth
  - location: Hicks Pond
  - elevation: 683 feet (208 m)

The Sanborn River is a 5.8-mile-long (9.3 km) river in Maine. It flows from its source (44°18′51″N 70°44′19″W) on Round Mountain in the unorganized territory of South Oxford to Hicks Pond in the town of Greenwood. Hicks Pond drains via Niles Brook into the Little Androscoggin River, the Androscoggin River, and thence into Merrymeeting Bay in the Kennebec River estuary.

== See also ==
- List of rivers of Maine
