= West Branch Machias River =

Location
- Country: United States

Physical characteristics
- Source
  - location: Lower Sabao Lake
- Mouth
  - location: Machias River
  - elevation: 215 feet (70 m)
- Length: 10 miles (16 km)

The West Branch Machias River is a 10.0-mile-long (16.1 km) tributary of the Machias River in Maine. The river starts from Sabao Dam (44°59′13″N 67°59′32″W) on the Lower Pond of Lower Sabao Lake.

== See also ==
- List of rivers of Maine
