= Maine State Route 174 =

State highway in Waldo County, Maine, US

State Route 174

Route information
- Maintained by MaineDOT
- Length: 3.82 mi (6.15 km)

Major junctions
- West end: US 1A in Prospect
- East end: US 1 / SR 3 in Prospect

Location
- Country: United States
- State: Maine
- Counties: Waldo

Highway system
- Maine State Highway System; Interstate; US; State; Auto trails; Lettered highways
← SR 173	→ SR 175

State Route 174 (SR 174) is a 3.82-mile-long (6.15 km) road from U.S. Route 1A (US 1A) to US 1/SR 3. For the entire length, SR 174 is named Fort Knox Road. The entire route is in Prospect, Waldo County.

== Route description ==
SR 174 begins at the intersection of US 1A (Bangor Road) and Hawes Bridge Road in the town center of Prospect. It heads east descending a small hill and crosses a railroad and marshland containing Carley Brook (just south of the South Branch Marsh River confluence). The road then ascends another hill and heads through a mostly wooded area with houses lining the road. It intersects Blanket Lane and Bowden Point Road before curving to the southeast and intersecting Shore Road. SR 174 now begins to closely parallel the Penobscot River, but at a higher elevation than the water surface. After Ferry Road, the road curves to the south at the entrance of Fort Knox. After passing a small parking area that was the former approach to the Waldo–Hancock Bridge, SR 174 ends at a signalized intersection with US 1/SR 3 at the western approach of the Penobscot Narrows Bridge.

== Junction list ==
The entire route is in Prospect, Waldo County.

mi	km	Destinations	Notes
0.00	0.00	US 1A (Bangor Road) / Hawes Bridge Road – Belfast, Winterport, Bangor	
3.82	6.15	US 1 / SR 3	
1.000 mi = 1.609 km; 1.000 km = 0.621 mi
