= East Branch Chandler River =

Location
- Country: United States

Physical characteristics
- Source
  - location: Maine
- Mouth
  - elevation: 60 feet (20 m)

The East Branch Chandler River is a 5.2-mile-long (8.4 km) tributary of the Chandler River in Washington County, Maine. It flows west from its source (44°42′17″N 67°34′20″W) in Jonesboro, to its mouth in Centerville.

== See also ==
- List of rivers of Maine
