= Roach River =

Roach River may refer to:

- Roach River (Maine)
- Roach River (Virginia)
- River Roach, a river that flows entirely through the English county of Essex

== See also ==
- River Roch, a river in Greater Manchester in North West England
