= North Branch Blackwater River (Maine) =

Location
- Country: United States

Physical characteristics
- Source
  - location: Maine
- Mouth
  - location: Blackwater River
  - elevation: 590 feet (180 m)
- Length: about 6 miles (10 km)

The North Branch Blackwater River is a 6.4-mile-long (10.3 km) river in Squa Pan Township (Township 10, Range 4, WELS), Aroostook County, Maine. From its source (46°29′25″N 68°11′29″W), the stream runs west to its confluence with the South Branch to form the Blackwater River. Via the Blackwater River, St. Croix Stream, and the Aroostook River, the North Branch is part of the Saint John River watershed.

== See also ==
- List of rivers of Maine
