= Orange River (Maine) =

Location
- Country: United States

Physical characteristics
- Source
  - location: Maine
- Mouth
  - location: Whiting Bay
  - coordinates: 44°47′33″N 67°10′16″W
  - elevation: sea level
- Length: 4.8 mi (7.7 km)

The Orange River is a short river in Whiting, Maine.

From the outflow of Orange Lake (44°45′57″N 67°14′18″W), the river runs 4.8 miles (7.7 km) northeast to Whiting Bay, an arm of Dennys Bay.

== See also ==
- List of rivers of Maine
