= South Branch Machias River =

Location
- Country: United States

Physical characteristics
- Source
  - location: Maine
- Mouth
  - location: Machias River
  - coordinates: 46°32′17″N 68°36′39″W
  - elevation: 690 feet (210 m)
- Length: 13.6 mi (21.9 km)

Basin features
- Progression: Machias — Aroostook — St. John — Bay of Fundy

The South Branch Machias River is a 13.6-mile-long (21.9 km) river in Aroostook County, Maine. From the outflow of Center Pond (46°31′25″N 68°44′49″W) in Maine Township 10, Range 8, WELS, the river runs east to its confluence with the Machias River in T.10 R.7 WELS. Via the Machias and Aroostook rivers, it is part of the Saint John River watershed.

== See also ==
- List of rivers of Maine
