= Frances West Atherton Pike =

- Born: March 17, 1819; Prospect
- Died: April 27, 1896; Cambridge
- Occupation: Writer

Frances West Atherton Pike (March 17, 1819 – April 27, 1896) was an American novelist.

She was born in Prospect, Maine and educated at the Free Street Seminary in Portland, Maine. She married Richard Pike in 1843. He worked as a minister for two decades in Dorchester, Massachusetts. They had three daughters and a son. In addition to her books, Frances Pike also contributed to the magazines The Monthly Religious Magazine and The Child's True Friend. Frances West Atherton Pike died on 27 April 1896 in Cambridge, Massachusetts.

== Bibliography ==
- Step by Step; or Delia Arlington: A Fireside Story. Boston: J. Munroe, 1857.
- Here and Hereafter: Or, The Two Altars (as Anna Athern). Boston: Crobsy, Nichols, and Company, 1858.
- Katherine Morris: An Autobiography. Boston: Walker, Wise and Company, 1860.
- Lady Aubrey: or, What Shall I do?. 2 vol. London: Saunders and Otley, 1860.
- Sunset Stories. 6 vol. 1863-66.
- Climbing and Sliding. 1866.
- Striving and Gaining. 1868.
- Every Day. Boston: Noyes, Holmes, and Company, 1871.
