= South Branch Blackwater River (Maine) =

Location
- Country: United States

Physical characteristics
- Source
  - location: Maine
- Mouth
  - location: Blackwater River
  - elevation: 590 feet (180 m)
- Length: about 9 miles (14 km)

The South Branch Blackwater River is an 8.9-mile-long (14.3 km) river in Aroostook County, Maine. From its source (46°25′23″N 68°08′31″W) in Maine Township 9, Range 3, WELS, the stream runs northwest to its confluence with the North Branch to form the Blackwater River in Squa Pan Township (T. 10, R. 4, WELS). Via the Blackwater River, St. Croix Stream, and the Aroostook River, the South Branch is part of the Saint John River watershed.

== See also ==
- List of rivers of Maine
