= Blackwater River (Maine) =

Location
- Country: United States

Physical characteristics
- Source
  - location: Maine
- Mouth
  - location: St. Croix Stream
  - elevation: 560 feet (170 m)
- Length: about 7 miles (11 km)

The Blackwater River is a 7.1-mile-long (11.4 km) river in Aroostook County, Maine. From the confluence of its North Branch and South Branch (46°29′14″N 68°15′07″W) in Squa Pan Township (Township 10, Range 4, WELS. The river runs west to St. Croix Stream in Masardis. Via St. Croix Stream and the Aroostook River, the Blackwater River is part of the Saint John River watershed.

== See also ==
- List of rivers of Maine
