= Little Saco River =

Coordinates: 43.98313°N 70.91701°W

Location
- Country: United States

Physical characteristics
- Source
  - location: Maine

The Little Saco River is a 4.5-mile-long (7.2 km) tributary of the Saco River in western Maine in the United States. It begins at the junction of Haley Brook and Paine Brook in the northern part of the town of Brownfield and flows northeast, entering the town of Fryeburg just before its mouth at the Saco.

== See also ==
- List of rivers of Maine
