= Back River (Meduncook River tributary) =

Location
- Country: United States

Physical characteristics
- Source
  - location: Maine
  - elevation: 55 feet (17 m)
- Mouth
  - location: Meduncook River
  - coordinates: 43°59′10″N 69°18′43″W
  - elevation: sea level
- Length: 2.7 mi (4.3 km)

The Back River is a short tributary of the Meduncook River in Friendship, Maine. From its source (44°01′02″N 69°18′16″W), the river runs 2.7 miles (4.3 km) south to the estuary of the Meduncook.

== See also ==
- List of rivers of Maine
