= Orland River =

Coordinates: 44.53313°N 68.75447°W

Location
- Country: United States

Physical characteristics
- Source
  - location: Maine

The Orland River is a 3.5-mile-long (5.6 km) river in the town of Orland in Hancock County, Maine, United States. It is part of the Penobscot River watershed.

== Background ==
The Orland River is primarily tidal and is known upstream from tidewater as the Narramissic River. The Orland River begins near the village of Orland and flows south, ending at the Eastern Channel of the Penobscot River around Verona Island, approximately 8 miles (13 km) upstream from the head of Penobscot Bay.

== Orland River Day ==
Orland River Day is held in June. The day consists of raft races, games, food, and a parade. Orland River Day was first established in 1975 and is currently holding its 45th anniversary as of June 2020.

== See also ==
- List of rivers of Maine
