= Little Bog River =

Location
- Country: United States

Physical characteristics
- Source
  - location: Maine
- Mouth
  - location: Mill Brook
  - coordinates: 44°41′00″N 68°16′04″W
  - elevation: 41 feet (12 m)
- Length: about 5 miles (8 km)

Basin features
- Progression: Mill Brook – Webb Pond – Webb Brook – Graham Lake – Union River – Union River Bay
- Tributaries
  - left: Fly Brook

The Little Bog River is a short stream in Hancock County, Maine. From its source (44°44′47″N 68°16′53″W) in Osborn, the river runs 5.4 miles (8.7 km) south to its confluence with Mill Brook in Eastbrook. Mill Brook flows west to Webb Pond. Via Mill Brook, Webb Pond, and Webb Brook, the Little Bog River is part of the Union River watershed.

== See also ==
- List of rivers of Maine
