= Englishman River (Maine) =

River in the United States

Location
- Country: United States

Physical characteristics
- Source
  - location: Maine
- Mouth
  - location: Englishman Bay
  - coordinates: 44°36′36″N 67°28′34″W
  - elevation: sea level
- Length: 8 mi (13 km)

The Englishman River is a short river in Washington County, Maine. From its source (44°40′18″N 67°29′26″W), in Whitneyville, Maine, the river runs about 8.1 miles (13.0 km) south to Roque Bluffs, where it empties into Englishman Bay.

== See also ==
- List of rivers of Maine
