= Skillings River =

River in the United States of America

Coordinates: 44.4728°N 68.2550°W

Location
- Country: United States

Physical characteristics
- Source
  - location: Maine
- Length: 7 mi (11 km)

The Skillings River is a 7-mile-long (11 km) tidal river in Hancock County, Maine, flowing to Frenchman Bay. For most of its length it forms the boundary between the towns of Hancock and Lamoine.

== See also ==
- List of rivers of Maine
