= Morrell House =

Historic house in Maine, United States

- U.S. National Register of Historic Places
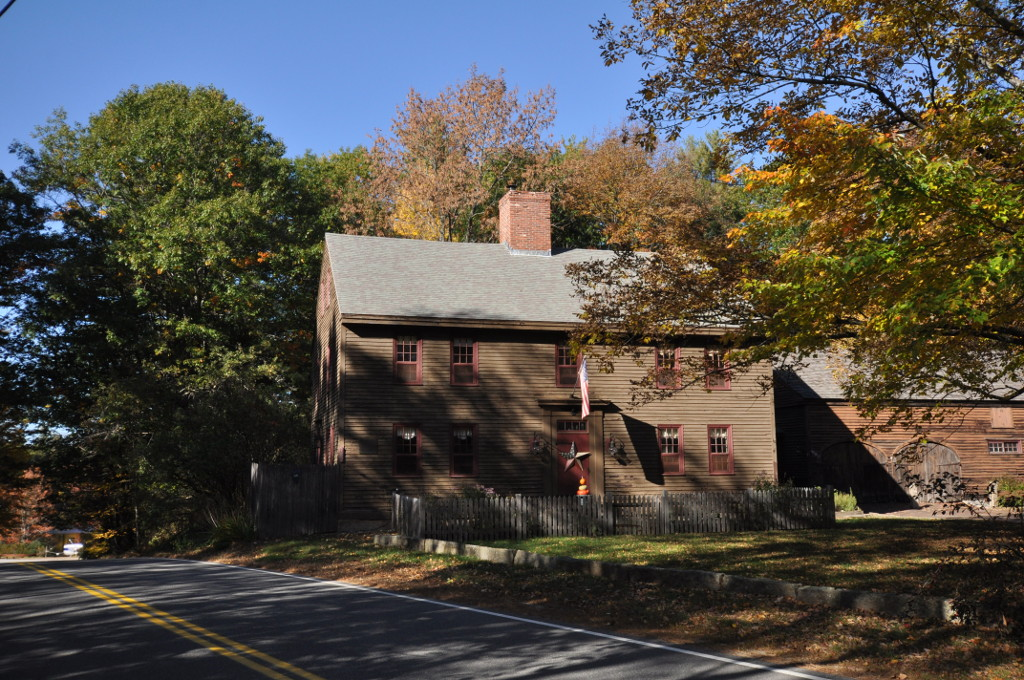

- Location within Maine Location within the United States
- Location: Morrills Mill Rd., North Berwick, Maine
- Coordinates: 43°21′21″N 70°44′20″W
- Area: 1 acre (0.40 ha)
- Built: 1763
- Built by: Winthrop Morrell
- Architectural style: Colonial
- NRHP reference No.: 76000194
- Added to NRHP: September 29, 1976

The Morrell House is a historic house on Morrills Mill Road in North Berwick, Maine. Built in 1763 by a descendant of one of the area's first European settlers, it is a fine local example of Georgian craftsmanship. It was listed on the National Register of Historic Places in 1976.

== Description and history ==
The Morrell House stands on the east side of Morrills Mill Road, a short way south of its crossing of Great Works River near the town line between North Berwick and Sanford. It is a 2 1/2-story wood-frame structure, with a side-gable roof, large central chimney, clapboard siding, and a granite foundation. Oriented to face south, the main facade is five bays wide, with a center entrance flanked by simple wooden pilasters and topped by a transom window and simple pediment. The interior follows a typical period central-chimney plan, with a narrow winding staircase in the front vestibule, with the parlor to the right and study to the left. The rear of the house is taken up by the kitchen, with a second staircase leading to one of the three bedrooms upstairs.

The area that is today North Berwick was originally part of Kittery in the 17th century, when land was granted here to John Morrell Sr. He built a log house in the area in 1640, and his sons Peter and Jedediah operated mills on the Great Works River. Jedediah's son Winthrop built this house in 1763. The building underwent a major restoration in the early 1970s.

== See also ==
- National Register of Historic Places listings in York County, Maine
