= Alder River =

River in Maine

Location
- Country: United States

Physical characteristics
- Source
  - location: Round Pond
- Mouth
  - location: Androscoggin River
  - elevation: 640 feet (200 m)
- Length: 6.3 mi (10.1 km)

The Alder River is a 6.3-mile-long (10.1 km) river in Maine. A tributary of the Androscoggin River, the Alder flows west from Locke Mills (44°24′00″N 070°42′13″W) to Bethel.

== See also ==
- List of rivers of Maine
