= Neoutaquet River =

Coordinates: 43.30231°N 70.73728°W

Location
- Country: United States

Physical characteristics
- Source
  - location: Maine

The Neoutaquet River is a 7.8-mile-long (12.6 km) tributary of the Great Works River in southern Maine. It flows entirely within the town of North Berwick. Via the Great Works and Salmon Falls rivers, it is part of the Piscataqua River watershed, flowing ultimately to the Atlantic Ocean.

== See also ==
- List of rivers of Maine
