= Concord River (Maine) =

Coordinates: 44.48479°N 70.64118°W

Location
- Country: United States

Physical characteristics
- Source
  - location: Maine

The Concord River is a 7.8-mile-long (12.6 km) tributary of the Androscoggin River in western Maine. The Androscoggin flows east and southeast to the Kennebec River near its mouth at the Atlantic Ocean.

The Concord River begins at the outlet of Concord Pond in Woodstock and flows northwest through Milton into the town of Rumford, where it reaches the Androscoggin.

== See also ==
- List of rivers of Maine
