= South Branch Marsh River =

Coordinates: 44.59785°N 68.85615°W

Location
- Country: United States

Physical characteristics
- Source
  - location: Maine

The South Branch Marsh River is a 3.0-mile-long (4.8 km) tidal river in the towns of Prospect and Frankfort in Waldo County, Maine. It joins the North Branch Marsh River to form Marsh Bay, a short arm of the tidal Penobscot River.

The South Branch forms in the town of Prospect at the confluence of Colson Stream and Carley Brook and flows north to its confluence with the North Branch.

== See also ==
- List of rivers of Maine
