= Sprague River (Maine) =

Coordinates: 43.72203°N 69.83477°W

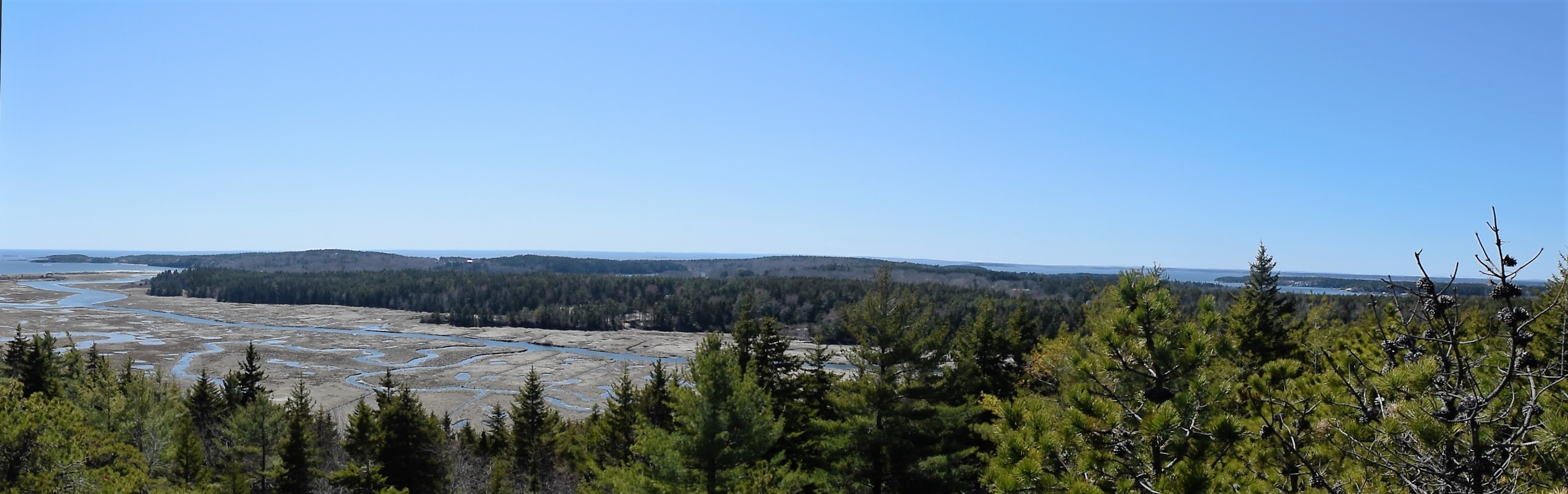

Location
- Country: United States

Physical characteristics
- Source
  - location: Maine

The Sprague River is a 2.5-mile-long (4.0 km) river in the town of Phippsburg, Maine. It flows primarily through tidal marsh and empties into the Atlantic Ocean, 1.5 miles (2.4 km) west of the mouth of the Morse River and 3.5 miles (5.6 km) west of the mouth of the Kennebec River.

== See also ==
- List of rivers of Maine
