= Johns River (Maine) =

Location
- Country: United States

Physical characteristics
- Source
  - location: Maine
- Mouth
  - location: Johns Bay
  - coordinates: 43°52′N 69°32′W
  - elevation: sea level

The Johns River is an extension of Johns Bay in Lincoln County, Maine. From Johns Island, it runs 2.5 miles (4 km) north, then splits into its Eastern Branch and North Branch, which run about a mile further north. It forms part of the border between Bristol and South Bristol.

== See also ==
- List of rivers of Maine
