= Mexico, Maine =

Town in Maine, United States

- Town
- Seal
- Motto: "Gateway to the Western Mountains"
- Location within Maine Location within the United States
- Coordinates: 44°34′12″N 70°29′50″W
- Country: United States
- State: Maine
- County: Oxford

Government
  - Type: Manager - selectboard government
  - Town manager: Amy Bernard

Area
  - Total: 23.57 sq mi (61.05 km^{2})
  - Land: 23.34 sq mi (60.45 km^{2})
  - Water: 0.23 sq mi (0.60 km^{2})
- Elevation: 1,001 ft (305 m)

Population (2020)
  - Total: 2,756
  - Density: 118/sq mi (45.6/km^{2})
- Time zone: UTC-5 (Eastern (EST))
  - Summer (DST): UTC-4 (EDT)
- ZIP code: 04257
- Area code: 207
- GNIS feature ID: 582593
- Website: mexicomaine.net

Mexico, near Rumford, is a town in Oxford County, Maine, United States. Mexico is included in the Lewiston-Auburn, Maine metropolitan New England City and Town Area. The population was 2,756 at the 2020 census. Mexico is a small mill town for the papermaking industry. It contains the census-designated place of the same name.

== History ==
The land was once part of Holmanstown Plantation, granted by the Massachusetts General Court in 1789 to Colonel Jonathan Holman of Sutton, Massachusetts (now Millbury) and others. In 1803, Dixfield was set off and incorporated. The plantation's remaining portion, which had been first settled by Isaac Gleason, was incorporated on February 13, 1818, as the town of Mexico. The name was inspired by local sympathy for Mexico's 1810–1821 fight for independence from Spain. Then known as Mexico Corner, it developed as a farming community with mills at the streams. In 1894, George W. Ridlon, president of the Rumford Falls Brick Company, founded a settlement in the eastern part of the town called Ridlonville. He erected 30 cottages and The Hotel Ridlon.

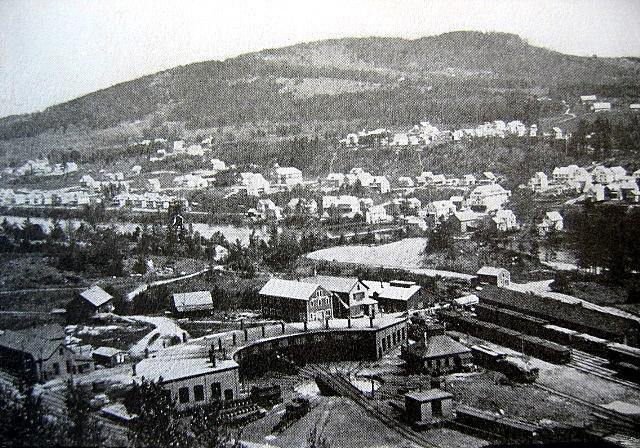
General view of Mexico from Rumford Falls c. 1905

Mexico is located on several hills overlooking the Androscoggin River. Across the river is the town of Rumford, which has a large paper mill. The Swift River empties into the Androscoggin at Mexico's southwest corner, its historic business center positioned in the 19th century near the source of water power. The Androscoggin forms Mexico's southern boundary with Rumford, while the smaller Swift River more or less follows its western boundary with that town. Mexico's downtown is located on land formed by the northeast corner of the right-angle junction of the two rivers. These low-lying riverbanks in Mexico have flooded many times, including 1936, 1953 and 1987.

== Geography ==
According to the United States Census Bureau, the town has a total area of 23.57 square miles (61.05 km^{2}), of which 23.34 square miles (60.45 km^{2}) is land and 0.23 square miles (0.60 km^{2}) is water. Mexico is drained by the Swift River and the Androscoggin River, the latter of which separates it from Rumford Falls.

=== Climate ===
This climatic region has large seasonal temperature differences, with warm to hot (and often humid) summers and cold (sometimes severely cold) winters. According to the Köppen Climate Classification system, Mexico has a humid continental climate, abbreviated "Dfb" on climate maps.

Climate data for Mexico, Maine
Month	Jan	Feb	Mar	Apr	May	Jun	Jul	Aug	Sep	Oct	Nov	Dec	Year
Mean daily maximum °F (°C)	27 (−3)	31 (−1)	39 (4)	52 (11)	66 (19)	75 (24)	79 (26)	77 (25)	69 (21)	57 (14)	43 (6)	31 (−1)	54 (12)
Mean daily minimum °F (°C)	7 (−14)	8 (−13)	19 (−7)	31 (−1)	41 (5)	51 (11)	56 (13)	54 (12)	46 (8)	36 (2)	28 (−2)	14 (−10)	33 (1)
Average precipitation inches (cm)	3 (7.6)	2.6 (6.6)	3.4 (8.6)	3.8 (9.7)	3.8 (9.7)	4.3 (11)	3.8 (9.7)	4 (10)	3.5 (8.9)	4.2 (11)	4.7 (12)	3.7 (9.4)	45 (110)
Source: Weatherbase

== Demographics ==
Historical population
Census	Pop.	Note	%±
1820	148		—
1830	343		131.8%
1840	447		30.3%
1850	482		7.8%
1860	671		39.2%
1870	458		−31.7%
1880	403		−12.0%
1890	355		−11.9%
1900	816		129.9%
1910	2,065		153.1%
1920	3,242		57.0%
1930	4,767		47.0%
1940	4,431		−7.0%
1950	4,762		7.5%
1960	5,043		5.9%
1970	4,309		−14.6%
1980	3,698		−14.2%
1990	3,344		−9.6%
2000	2,959		−11.5%
2010	2,681		−9.4%
2020	2,756		2.8%
U.S. Decennial Census

=== 2010 census ===
As of the census of 2010, there were 2,681 people, 1,185 households, and 735 families living in the town. The population density was 114.9 inhabitants per square mile (44.4/km^{2}). There were 1,404 housing units at an average density of 60.2 per square mile (23.2/km^{2}). The racial makeup of the town was 96.6% White, 0.4% African American, 0.4% Native American, 0.9% Asian, 0.3% from other races, and 1.4% from two or more races. Hispanic or Latino people of any race were 0.9% of the population.

There were 1,185 households, of which 26.0% had children under the age of 18 living with them, 41.3% were married couples living together, 15.2% had a female householder with no husband present, 5.6% had a male householder with no wife present, and 38.0% were non-families. 29.5% of all households were made up of individuals, and 12.8% had someone living alone who was 65 years of age or older. The average household size was 2.26 and the average family size was 2.72.

The median age in the town was 44.7 years. 19.4% of residents were under the age of 18; 8.8% were between the ages of 18 and 24; 22.1% were from 25 to 44; 32.1% were from 45 to 64; and 17.6% were 65 years of age or older. The gender makeup of the town was 49.3% male and 50.7% female.

=== 2000 census ===
As of the census of 2000, there were 2,959 people, 1,298 households, and 820 families living in the town. The population density was 126.3 inhabitants per square mile (48.8/km^{2}). There were 1,448 housing units at an average density of 61.8 per square mile (23.9/km^{2}). The racial makeup of the town was 97.84% White, 0.24% Black or African American, 0.88% Asian, and 1.05% from two or more races. Hispanic or Latino people of any race were 0.27% of the population.

There were 1,298 households, out of which 28.4% had children under the age of 18 living with them, 44.5% were married couples living together, 13.0% had a female householder with no husband present, and 36.8% were non-families. 31.5% of all households were made up of individuals, and 15.5% had someone living alone who was 65 years of age or older. The average household size was 2.27 and the average family size was 2.80.

In the town, the population was spread out, with 24.0% under the age of 18, 6.7% from 18 to 24, 27.9% from 25 to 44, 21.8% from 45 to 64, and 19.6% who were 65 years of age or older. The median age was 40 years. For every 100 females, there were 95.6 males. For every 100 females age 18 and over, there were 91.4 males.

The median income for a household in the town was $27,406, and the median income for a family was $33,776. Males had a median income of $38,214 versus $23,298 for females. The per capita income for the town was $16,322. About 10.9% of families and 15.9% of the population were below the poverty line, including 22.0% of those under age 18 and 5.1% of those age 65 or over.

== Sites of interest ==
- Mexico Historical Society & Museum

== Education ==
The Town of Mexico has immediate access to the University of Maine System's seven universities through University College at Rumford/Mexico. University College delivers courses and programs through a variety of modalities, including the traditional classroom, interactive television (ITV), video conferencing, online, and blended classes that use a variety of these modalities. University College provides services to faculty and students that include off-campus library services, academic advising, career development, application and financial aid assistance, computer access, technical support, and a place for adults to meet and study. Its students may take a few courses for personal growth, or complete any of a number of programs.

== Notable people ==
- Chummy Broomhall, cross-country skier
- Ed McMahon, entertainment personality
- Charles W. Walton, U.S. congressman
