= Batson River =

River in the United States of America

Coordinates: 43°24′1.5″N 70°27′3.9″W

Location
- Country: United States

Physical characteristics
- Source
  - location: Maine

The Batson River is a 6.4-mile-long (10.3 km) river in the town of Kennebunkport in the U.S. state of Maine. It flows into the west end of Goosefare Bay, an arm of the Atlantic Ocean, north of the village of Cape Porpoise.

== See also ==
- List of rivers of Maine
