= Muddy River (Sebago Lake) =

Coordinates: 43.94979°N 70.62561°W

Location
- Country: United States

Physical characteristics
- Source
  - location: Maine

The Muddy River is a 5.3-mile-long (8.5 km) tributary of Sebago Lake in the U.S. state of Maine.

== See also ==
- List of rivers of Maine
