= Mexico (CDP), Maine =

Mexico, Maine
- Census-designated place
- Location within Maine Location within the United States
- Coordinates: 44°33′25″N 70°32′06″W
- Country: United States
- State: Maine
- County: Oxford

Area
  - Total: 1.83 sq mi (4.73 km^{2})
  - Land: 1.77 sq mi (4.58 km^{2})
  - Water: 0.058 sq mi (0.15 km^{2})
- Elevation: 617 ft (188 m)

Population (2020)
  - Total: 2,234
  - Density: 1,263.2/sq mi (487.72/km^{2})
- Time zone: UTC-5 (Eastern (EST))
  - Summer (DST): UTC-4 (EDT)
- ZIP code: 04257
- Area code: 207
- FIPS code: 23-45250
- GNIS feature ID: 2377936

Mexico is a census-designated place (CDP) in the town of Mexico in Oxford County, Maine, United States. The population was 1,946 at the 2000 census.

== Geography ==
Mexico is located at 44°33′25″N 70°32′24″W (44.557153, −70.540252).

According to the United States Census Bureau, the CDP has a total area of 1.0 square miles (2.7 km^{2}), all land.

== Demographics ==
Historical population
| Census | Pop. | Note | %± |
|---|---|---|---|
| 2020 | 2,234 | | — |
U.S. Decennial Census

As of the census of 2000, there were 1,946 people, 869 households, and 523 families residing in the CDP. The population density was 1,881.3 inhabitants per square mile (726.4/km^{2}). There were 980 housing units at an average density of 947.4 per square mile (365.8/km^{2}). The racial makeup of the CDP was 98.25% White, 0.36% Black or African American, 0.51% Asian, and 0.87% from two or more races. Hispanic or Latino of any race were 0.26% of the population.

There were 869 households, out of which 27.7% had children under the age of 18 living with them, 40.0% were married couples living together, 13.7% had a female householder with no husband present, and 39.8% were non-families. 33.5% of all households were made up of individuals, and 15.3% had someone living alone who was 65 years of age or older. The average household size was 2.23 and the average family size was 2.80.

In the CDP, the population was spread out, with 23.8% under the age of 18, 7.0% from 18 to 24, 29.3% from 25 to 44, 20.9% from 45 to 64, and 19.0% who were 65 years of age or older. The median age was 40 years. For every 100 females, there were 93.4 males. For every 100 females age 18 and over, there were 90.6 males.

The median income for a household in the CDP was $26,413, and the median income for a family was $31,635. Males had a median income of $32,070 versus $24,048 for females. The per capita income for the CDP was $15,221. About 12.4% of families and 18.0% of the population were below the poverty line, including 23.7% of those under age 18 and 4.7% of those age 65 or over.
