= Little River (York, Maine) =

Coordinates: 43°09′00″N 70°37′47″W

Location
- Country: United States

Physical characteristics
- Source
  - location: Maine

The Little River is a 2.9-mile-long (4.7 km) river in the town of York, Maine, that flows directly into the Atlantic Ocean. It is located north of the York River and south of the Cape Neddick River, reaching the Atlantic near the south end of York Beach.

== See also ==
- List of rivers of Maine
