= River of the dead =

River of the dead may indicate:

- Imjin River, nicknamed river of the dead because large numbers of dead North Koreans have floated down it
- a location in The Legend of Zelda: Breath of the Wild
- River of the Dead (Barbara Nadel), a novel by Barbara Nadel

== See also ==
- Dead River (disambiguation)
