= Red River (Maine) =

Location
- Country: United States

Physical characteristics
- Source
  - location: Maine
- Mouth
  - location: St. Froid Lake (Fish River)
  - elevation: 581 feet (177 m)
- Length: about 13 miles (20 km)

The Red River is a 15.7-mile-long (25.3 km) river in the North Maine Woods region, within Aroostook County, Maine.

From the outflow of Fish Pond (46°57′29″N 68°50′01″W) in Maine Township 15, Range 9, WELS, the river runs about 7 miles (10 km) southeast to Red River Falls in T.14 R.8 WELS, falling about 450 feet (140 m). It runs then about 6 miles (9.7 km) northeast to St. Froid Lake in Winterville Plantation falling about 90 feet (30 m).

The lake is drained by the Fish River, a tributary of the Saint John River.

== See also ==
- List of rivers of Maine
