= South Branch Stroudwater River =

Coordinates: 43.64230°N 70.42505°W

Location
- Country: United States

Physical characteristics
- Source
  - location: Maine

The South Branch Stroudwater River is a 3.1-mile-long (5.0 km) stream in Cumberland County, Maine, in the United States. It is a tributary of the Stroudwater River, part of the watershed of the Fore River, the harbor for the city of Portland.

The South Branch rises in Scarborough at the junction of Fogg Brook and Silver Brook and flows northeast into the town of Gorham, where it joins the Stroudwater River near the village of South Gorham.

== See also ==
- List of rivers of Maine
