= Chandler River (Maine) =

River in Maine, United States

Location
- Country: United States

Physical characteristics
- Source
  - location: Maine
- Mouth
  - elevation: sea level

The Chandler River is a 24.5-mile-long (39.4 km) river in Washington County, Maine. It flows from its source (44°42′49″N 67°34′48″W) on Cottontail Hill in Centerville to Jonesboro, where it empties into Englishman Bay.

== See also ==
- List of rivers of Maine
