= Meduncook River =

Location
- Country: United States

Physical characteristics
- Source
  - location: Maine
  - elevation: 110 feet (34 m)
- Mouth
  - location: Muscongus Bay
  - coordinates: 43°56′42″N 69°19′30″W
  - elevation: sea level
- Length: about 7 miles (11 km)

Basin features
- Tributaries
  - right: Back River

The Meduncook River is a 7-mile-long (11 km) river in Knox County, Maine. From its source (44°01′04″N 69°17′03″W) in Friendship, the river runs about 1 mile south to the head of its estuary, then about 6 miles southwest to Muscongus Bay. The estuary forms part of the border between Friendship and Cushing.

== See also ==
- List of rivers of Maine
