= Pleasant River (Androscoggin River tributary) =

Coordinates: 44°24′3″N 70°52′35″W

Location
- Country: United States

Physical characteristics
- Mouth
  - location: Androscoggin River
  - elevation: 643 ft (196 m)

Pleasant River is a 4.7-mile-long (7.6 km) river in Oxford County, Maine in the United States. It is a tributary of the Androscoggin River, which flows east and south to join the Kennebec River in Merrymeeting Bay near the Atlantic Ocean.

There are three other rivers in Maine named "Pleasant River", but only one that is a tributary of the Androscoggin River. This Pleasant River has two main tributaries, the West Branch Pleasant River and the East Branch Pleasant River. The West Branch flows from headwaters near Haystack Notch in the White Mountain National Forest. The East Branch flows from headwaters near Farwell Mountain and Peter Mountain, also in the national forest. The two branches flow northward, collecting various small tributaries. They join to form the Pleasant River, which flows north for a few miles before joining the Androscoggin River a few miles west of the town of Bethel.

== See also ==
- List of rivers of Maine
