= Little River (Fish River tributary) =

Location
- Country: United States

Physical characteristics
- Source
  - location: Maine
- Mouth
  - location: Long Lake (Fish River)
  - elevation: 581 feet (177 m)

The Little River is a short river in Madawaska, Maine, about 4 miles (6 km) from the Canada–United States border. The river flows west 5.1 miles (8.2 km) from its source (47°15′03″N 68°11′53″W) to Long Lake. The lake drains — via Mud Lake, Cross Lake, Square Lake, and Eagle Lake — into the Fish River, a tributary of the Saint John River.

== See also ==
- List of rivers of Maine
