= Little River (Pleasant River tributary) =

Location
- Country: United States

Physical characteristics
- Source
  - location: Maine
- Mouth
  - location: Pleasant River
  - coordinates: 44°40′35″N 67°44′42″W
  - elevation: 30 feet (10 m)
- Length: 7 mi (11 km)

The Little River is a tributary of the Pleasant River in Columbia Falls, Maine. From its source (44°44′16″N 67°44′25″W), the river runs 7.1 miles (11.4 km) south to its confluence with the Pleasant River.

== See also ==
- List of rivers of Maine
