= Morse River (Maine) =

Coordinates: 43.73231°N 69.80643°W

Location
- Country: United States

Physical characteristics
- Source
  - location: Maine

The Morse River is a 1.7-mile-long (2.7 km) tidal river in Phippsburg, Maine. It flows directly into the Atlantic Ocean, 2 miles (3 km) west of the mouth of the Kennebec River.

== See also ==
- List of rivers of Maine
