= Little River (Passamaquoddy Bay) =

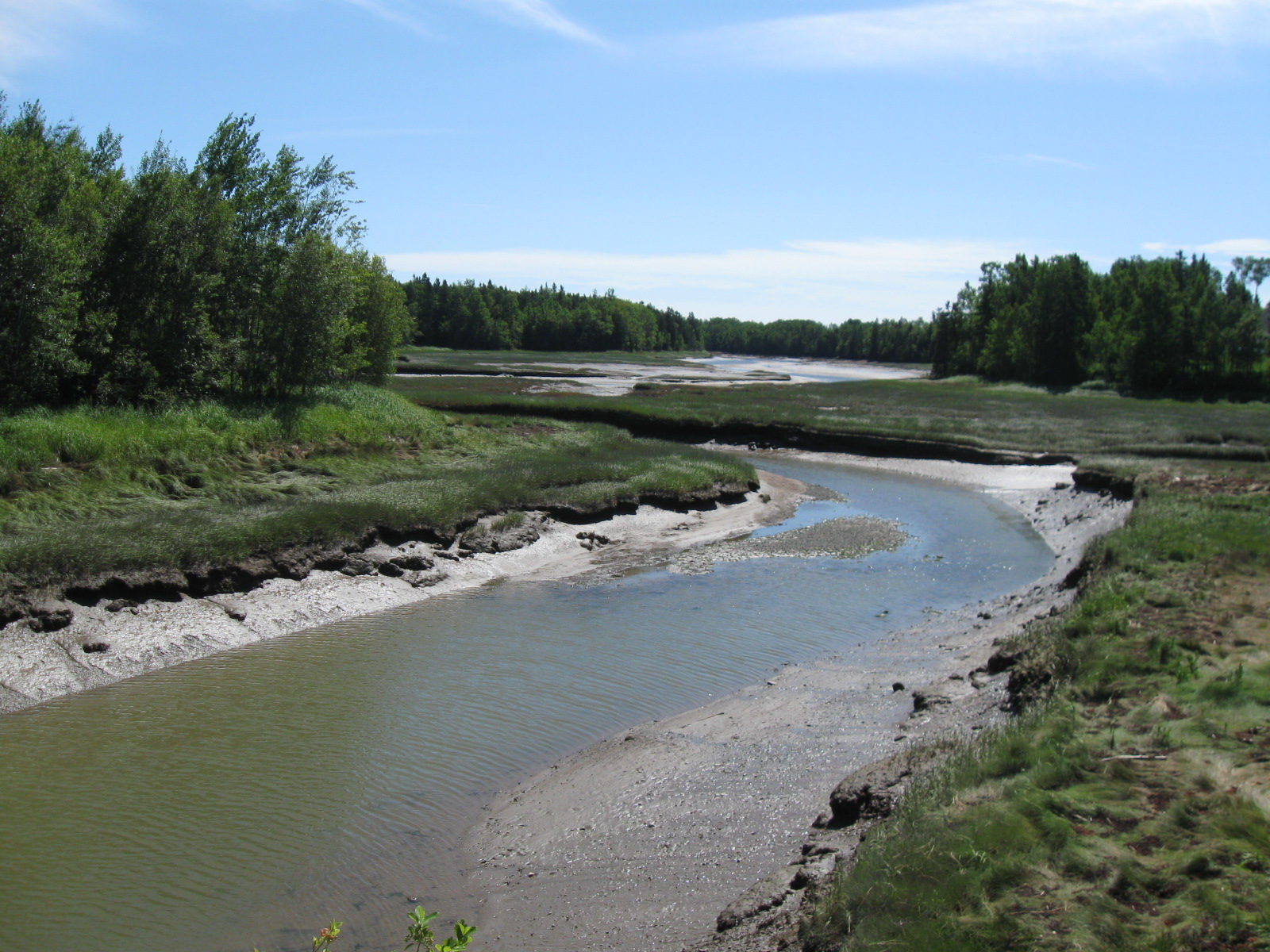

Location
- Country: United States

Physical characteristics
- Source
  - location: Maine
- Mouth
  - location: Passamaquoddy Bay
  - coordinates: 44°58′15″N 67°03′27″W
  - elevation: sea level
- Length: about 2 miles (3 km)

The Little River is a short, mostly-tidal river in Perry, Maine. From Boyden Stream Reservoir (44°58′20″N 67°05′23″W) it runs about 2 miles (3 km) east to Passamaquoddy Bay.

== See also ==
- List of rivers of Maine
