= Roach River (Maine) =

River in the United States of America

Location
- Country: United States

Physical characteristics
- Source
  - location: Maine
  - elevation: 1,303 feet (397 m)
- Mouth
  - location: Moosehead Lake
  - coordinates: 45°41′53″N 69°32′38″W
  - elevation: 1,029 feet (314 m)
- Length: 19 mi (31 km)

Basin features
- River system: Kennebec River

The Roach River is a river in Piscataquis County, Maine. From the outlet of Third Roach Pond (45°39′02″N 69°14′29″W) in Shawtown (Maine Township A, Range 12, WELS), the river runs 19.1 miles (30.7 km) west, through a chain of ponds. The Flow sequence through the ponds is from the Fourth Roach Pond through the Third Roach Pond, Second Roach Pond, and First Roach Pond to empty into Moosehead Lake, the source of the Kennebec River, in Spencer Bay (T1, R14, WELS). The Seventh Roach Pond drains through the Sixth Roach Pond in a separate tributary to the Third Roach Pond. No fifth Roach Pond is shown on modern maps.

The headwaters of the Roach River, as well as Second Roach Pond, Third Roach Pond, and Fourth Roach Pond, lie on land purchased by the Appalachian Mountain Club in 2009. In 2014, a section of Roach River, which was viewed as essential nursery habitat for young fish, was temporarily dewatered during dam reconstruction on land owned by the club.

== First Roach Pond ==
First Roach Pond
- Location within Maine
- Location: Piscataquis County, Maine
- Coordinates: 45°39′N 69°23′W
- Basin countries: United States
- Max. length: 6.5 mi (10.5 km)
- Max. width: 1.1 mi (1.8 km)
- Surface area: 3,320 acres (1,340 ha)
- Max. depth: 123 feet (37 m)
- Water volume: 176,410 acre⋅ft (217,600,000 m^{3})
- Surface elevation: 1,227 ft (374 m)

First Roach Pond is the largest of the Roach Ponds and extends across the north part of Frenchtown Township. Roach River enters the north side of the pond 2 miles (3.2 km) downstream of Second Roach Pond, and overflows a dam at the west end of First Roach Pond 6 miles (9.7 km) upstream of Moosehead Lake. Spawning tributaries Inlet Brook enters the east end of the pond, and Lagoon Brook enters the south shore of the pond near the dam. The pond offers good habitat for lake trout and land-locked Atlantic salmon. Lake whitefish disappeared from the pond in the 1970s, and brook trout populations have been declining since yellow perch became established in the 1990s. The outlet dam is intended to provide a barrier against migration of white perch and smallmouth bass from Moosehead Lake.

== Second Roach Pond ==
Second Roach Pond
- Location within Maine
- Coordinates: 45°41′N 69°18′W
- Max. length: 3.5 mi (5.6 km)
- Surface area: 872 acres (353 ha)
- Max. depth: 46 feet (14 m)
- Water volume: 16,553 acre⋅ft (20,418,000 m^{3})
- Surface elevation: 1,270 ft (390 m)

Second Roach Pond extends along the southern edge of Maine township 1, range 12, reaching across the northern border of Shawtown township. Roach River enters the east end of the pond, and overflows through remains of a dam at the west end of the pond. The dam was built for early 20th-century log driving, but use of the dam ceased in 1969, and the remains were washed out in 1983. Summer temperatures in the pond are unfavorable for trout and salmon, and survival of stocked salmon has been poor since whitefish disappeared from the pond in the 1970s. Native rainbow smelt may fare poorly in competition with yellow perch which reached the pond after the dam was abandoned.

== Third Roach Pond ==
Third Roach Pond
- Location within Maine
- Coordinates: 45°39′N 69°14′W
- Max. length: 1.9 mi (3.1 km)
- Surface area: 554 acres (224 ha)
- Max. depth: 26 feet (7.9 m)
- Water volume: 6,664 acre⋅ft (8,220,000 m^{3})
- Surface elevation: 1,303 ft (397 m)

Third Roach Pond is in eastern Shawtown township. Roach River overflows the northwest end of the pond 1.5 miles (2.4 km) upstream of Second Roach Pond. Summer water temperatures are unfavorable for native trout which do poorly in competition with introduced yellow perch; but the Maine Department of inland Fisheries and Wildlife has stocked the pond with salmon, and a few splake may reach the pond from the adjacent Fourth Roach Pond.

== Fourth Roach Pond ==
Fourth Roach Pond
- Location within Maine
- Coordinates: 45°39′N 69°15′W
- Max. length: 1.1 mi (1.8 km)
- Surface area: 248 acres (100 ha)
- Max. depth: 40 feet (12 m)
- Water volume: 3,548 acre⋅ft (4,376,000 m^{3})
- Surface elevation: 1,302 ft (397 m)

Fourth Roach Pond is west of and adjacent to Third Roach Pond in eastern Shawtown township. The two ponds are connected by a short narrows and maintain similar water elevation. Summer water temperatures are unfavorable for native trout which do poorly in competition with introduced yellow perch; but the Maine Department of Inland Fisheries and Wildlife stocks the pond with splake.

== Sixth and Seventh Roach Ponds ==
The 40-acre (16 ha) Sixth Roach Pond is only 4 feet (1.2 m) deep and provides marginal trout habitat in comparison to thriving hornpout and white sucker. Sixth Roach Pond overflows into Third Roach Pond 500 yards (460 m) to the south, and receives drainage from Seventh Roach Pond 1 kilometre (1,100 yd) to the east in Maine township A, range 11. The 33-acre (13 ha) Seventh Roach Pond is 10 feet (3.0 m) deep and white sucker keep the pond turbid by feeding on the muddy bottom. Summer temperatures are unfavorable for brook trout, but a few move into the pond from tributaries.

== See also ==
- List of rivers of Maine
