= Merriland River =

Coordinates: 43.34286°N 70.54561°W

Location
- Country: United States

Physical characteristics
- Source
  - location: Maine

The Merriland River is a 12.9-mile-long (20.8 km) river in York County, Maine. It is a main tributary of the Little River, a tidal estuary that empties into the Atlantic Ocean.

The Merriland River rises in the southern corner of Sanford and flows east into Wells, which it crosses to the east border of the town and ends at the Little River.

== See also ==
- List of rivers of Maine
