= Tenmile River (Maine) =

Coordinates: 43.93396°N 70.85090°W

Location
- Country: United States

Physical characteristics
- Source
  - location: Maine

The Tenmile River is an 8.6-mile-long (13.8 km) river in the towns of Hiram and Brownfield in western Maine in the United States. It is a tributary of the Saco River, which flows to the Atlantic Ocean.

== See also ==
- List of rivers of Maine
