= Cape Neddick River =

Coordinates: 43°10′57.54″N 70°38′46.82″W

Location
- Country: United States

Physical characteristics
- Source
  - location: Maine

The Cape Neddick River is a 3.7-mile-long (6.0 km) river in the town of York in southern Maine. It rises at the outlet of Chases Pond and flows east to the Atlantic Ocean, reaching its mouth at Cape Neddick Harbor near the village of Cape Neddick.

== See also ==
- List of rivers of Maine
