= Little River (Androscoggin River tributary) =

Coordinates: 43.9919°N 70.05149°W

Location
- Country: United States

Physical characteristics
- Source
  - location: Maine

The Little River is a 7.3-mile-long (11.7 km) tributary of the Androscoggin River in the U.S. state of Maine. It forms the boundary between Sagadahoc and Androscoggin counties.

The Little River rises near West Bowdoin at the junction of Fisher Stream and Purington Brook and flows south, joining the Androscoggin River just east of Lisbon Falls. The river forms the boundary between the town of Lisbon in Androscoggin County to the west and the towns of Bowdoin and Topsham in Sagadahoc County to the east.

== See also ==
- List of rivers of Maine
