= Marsh River (Maine) =

Coordinates: 44.02536°N 69.62255°W

Location
- Country: United States

Physical characteristics
- Source
  - location: Maine

The Marsh River is a 3.9-mile-long (6.3 km) tidal river in Newcastle, Maine. It is a tributary of the Sheepscot River.

== See also ==
- List of rivers of Maine
