= Chandler Bay =

Bay in Jonesport, Maine, U.S.

Coordinates: 44°34′N 67°32′W

Chandler Bay is a bay in Jonesport, Maine.

It is separated from Englishman Bay to the northeast by Roque Island and Great Spruce Island. The bay extends roughly 6 mi. (10 km) and is 2.5 mi. (4 km) at its widest.
