= Little River (Goosefare Bay) =

Coordinates: 43°25′15.4″N 70°24′26.2″W

Location
- Country: United States

Physical characteristics
- Source
  - location: Maine

The Little River is a 7.6-mile-long (12.2 km) tributary of Goosefare Bay in the U.S. state of Maine. It rises in Biddeford and flows southeast, becoming the boundary between Biddeford and Kennebunkport for the final 2.8 miles (4.5 km) of its course. It empties into Goosefare Bay on the Atlantic Ocean at the east end of Kennebunkport's Goose Rocks Beach.

During part of the 19th century, a seasonal water-powered sawmill operated near what is now known as Timber Point.

== See also ==
- List of rivers of Maine
