= Sticky River =

River in Maine, United States

Coordinates: 43°45′50.2″N 70°33′1.9″W

The Sticky River is a 3.4-mile-long (5.5 km) river that flows into the southern end of Sebago Lake in Standish, Maine.
