= Little River (Kennebec River tributary) =

Coordinates: 44.06480°N 69.78699°W

Little River (Kennebec River)

Location
- Country: United States

Physical characteristics
- Source
  - location: Maine

The Little River is a tidal channel connecting at each end with the Kennebec River in the town of Perkins in the U.S. state of Maine. It passes to the west of Little Swan Island while the main stem of the Kennebec passes to the east.

== See also ==
- List of rivers of Maine
