= Little River (Damariscotta River tributary) =

Location
- Country: United States

Physical characteristics
- Source
  - location: Boothbay, Maine
- Mouth
  - location: Ocean Harbor
  - coordinates: 43°49′44″N 69°35′04″W
  - elevation: sea level
- Length: 2.1 mi (3.4 km)

The Little River is a 2.1-mile-long (3.4 km) stream and tidal river on Linekin Neck in the town of Boothbay in the U.S. state of Maine. It is a small tidal river for its lower 1.4 miles (2.3 km), entering the Atlantic Ocean just west of the mouth of the Damariscotta River.

== See also ==
- List of rivers of Maine
