= Whiting Bay (Maine) =

Bay in Maine, United States

Coordinates: 44.850°N 67.142°W

Whiting Bay is a bay in Whiting, Maine, in the United States.
