= West Branch Narraguagus River (Hancock County, Maine) =

Location
- Country: United States

Physical characteristics
- Source
  - location: Maine
- Mouth
  - location: Narraguagus River
  - coordinates: 44°56′35″N 68°06′50″W
  - elevation: 335 feet (100 m)
- Length: 7.6 miles (12.2 km)

The West Branch Narraguagus River is a short stream in Township 34, MD, Hancock County, Maine. From its source (44°57′45″N 68°13′13″W), the river runs 7.6 miles (12.2 km) east and southeast to its confluence with the Narraguagus River.

== See also ==
- List of rivers of Maine
- West Branch Narraguagus River (Cherryfield, Maine), which joins the parent river about 25 miles (40 km) downstream in the town of Cherryfield.
