= Little River (Ossipee River tributary) =

Coordinates: 43.80674°N 70.79951°W

Location
- Country: United States

Physical characteristics
- Source
  - location: Maine

The Little River is a 7.0-mile-long (11.3 km) tributary of the Ossipee River in the U.S. state of Maine. Via the Ossipee River, it is part of the Saco River watershed, flowing to the Atlantic Ocean. The Little River flows entirely within the town of Cornish.

== See also ==
- List of rivers of Maine
