= Little River (Penobscot Bay) =

River in Waldo County, Maine, United States

Location
- Country: United States

Physical characteristics
- Source
  - location: Maine
  - elevation: 345 feet (105 m)
- Mouth
  - location: Penobscot Bay
  - coordinates: 44°23′38″N 68°59′17″W
  - elevation: sea level
- Length: 8 mi (13 km)

The Little River is a short river in Waldo County, Maine. From its source (44°22′53″N 69°04′58″W) in Belmont, the river runs 8.0 miles (12.9 km) east to Belfast Bay, on the border between Belfast and Northport.

== See also ==
- List of rivers of Maine
