= Prospect, Maine =

Town in Maine, United States

- Town
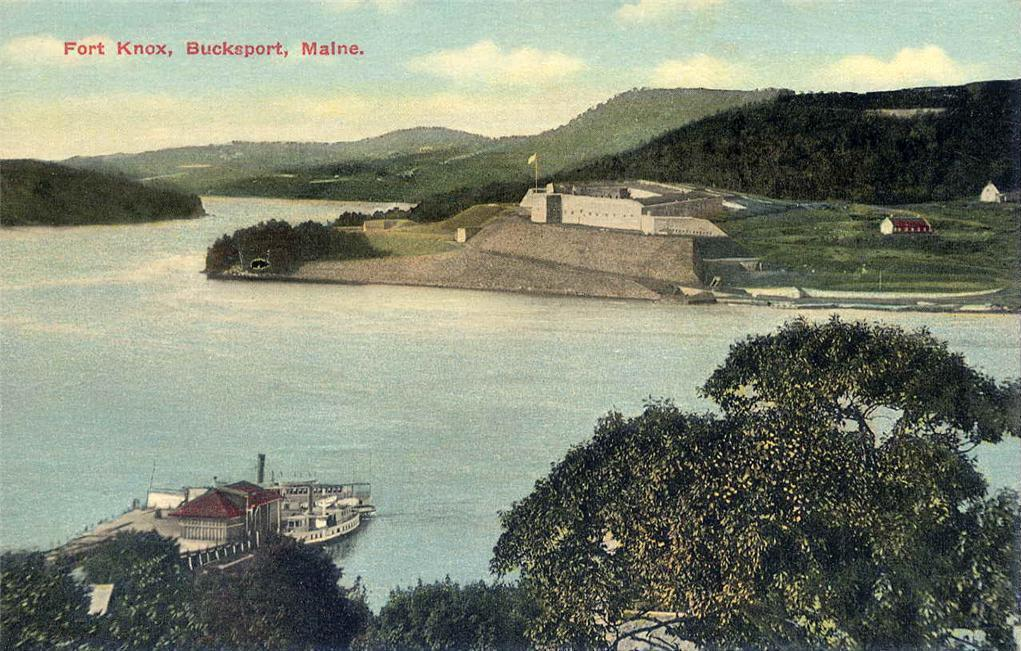
- Fort Knox c. 1910

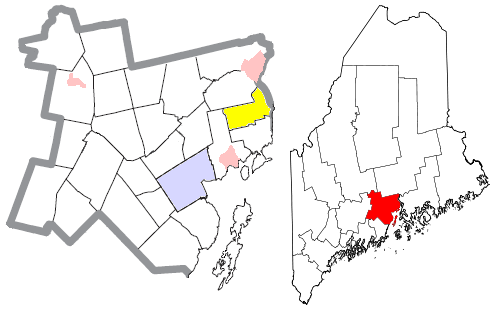
- Location of Prospect (in yellow) in Waldo County and the state of Maine
- Coordinates: 44°33′18″N 68°53′09″W
- Country: United States
- State: Maine
- County: Waldo
- Incorporated: 1794

Area
  - Total: 20.20 sq mi (52.32 km^{2})
  - Land: 18.09 sq mi (46.85 km^{2})
  - Water: 2.11 sq mi (5.46 km^{2})
- Elevation: 105 ft (32 m)

Population (2020)
  - Total: 698
  - Density: 39/sq mi (14.9/km^{2})
- Time zone: UTC-5 (Eastern (EST))
  - Summer (DST): UTC-4 (EDT)
- ZIP code: 04981
- Area code: 207
- FIPS code: 23-61210
- GNIS feature ID: 582688
- Website: prospectmaine.gov

Prospect is a town in Waldo County, Maine, United States. The population was 698 at the 2020 census.

The most prominent landmark in Prospect is Fort Knox, a large 19th-century fort. It is now a major tourist attraction, as is the Penobscot Narrows Bridge and Observatory.

== History ==
Originally part of Frankfort, it was settled in 1759 when Fort Pownall was completed at Fort Point on Cape Jellison. Prospect was set off and incorporated in 1794. Land was then set off from Prospect in 1845 to form part of Searsport. Stockton (later Stockton Springs) was set off and incorporated in 1857. Shipbuilding was an early industry. By 1859, the town had one gristmill, three sawmills and a shingle mill. Construction on Fort Knox began in 1844, using granite from Mount Waldo in Frankfort. It was built to defend the Penobscot River and the lumber port of Bangor during the Aroostook War. Although never fully completed, work on the huge defense stopped in 1869.

== Geography ==
According to the United States Census Bureau, the town has a total area of 20.20 square miles (52.32 km^{2}), of which 18.09 square miles (46.85 km^{2}) is land and 2.11 square miles (5.46 km^{2}) is water. Drained by the south branch of the Marsh River, Prospect is situated along the west bank of the Penobscot River.

The town is crossed by U.S. Route 1, U.S. Route 1A, Maine State Route 3 and Maine State Route 174.

== Demographics ==
Historical population
Census	Pop.	Note	%±
1800	770		—
1810	1,300		68.8%
1820	1,771		36.2%
1830	2,383		34.6%
1840	3,492		46.5%
1850	2,467		−29.4%
1860	1,005		−59.3%
1870	886		−11.8%
1880	770		−13.1%
1890	697		−9.5%
1900	648		−7.0%
1910	597		−7.9%
1920	431		−27.8%
1930	288		−33.2%
1940	430		49.3%
1950	392		−8.8%
1960	412		5.1%
1970	358		−13.1%
1980	511		42.7%
1990	542		6.1%
2000	642		18.5%
2010	709		10.4%
2020	698		−1.6%
U.S. Decennial Census

=== 2010 census ===
As of the census of 2010, there were 709 people, 291 households, and 197 families living in the town. The population density was 39.2 inhabitants per square mile (15.1/km^{2}). There were 337 housing units at an average density of 18.6 per square mile (7.2/km^{2}). The racial makeup of the town was 98.4% White, 0.3% African American, 0.4% Native American, 0.1% Asian, and 0.7% from two or more races. Hispanic or Latino of any race were 0.3% of the population.

There were 291 households, of which 32.3% had children under the age of 18 living with them, 52.9% were married couples living together, 10.3% had a female householder with no husband present, 4.5% had a male householder with no wife present, and 32.3% were non-families. 23.7% of all households were made up of individuals, and 6.9% had someone living alone who was 65 years of age or older. The average household size was 2.44 and the average family size was 2.84.

The median age in the town was 44.3 years. 21.7% of residents were under the age of 18; 6.3% were between the ages of 18 and 24; 23.1% were from 25 to 44; 36% were from 45 to 64; and 12.8% were 65 years of age or older. The gender makeup of the town was 51.6% male and 48.4% female.

=== 2000 census ===
As of the census of 2000, there were 642 people, 253 households, and 190 families living in the town. The population density was 35.5 inhabitants per square mile (13.7/km^{2}). There were 286 housing units at an average density of 15.8 per square mile (6.1/km^{2}). The racial makeup of the town was 98.60% White, 0.16% Native American, and 1.25% from two or more races. Hispanic or Latino of any race were 0.16% of the population.

There were 253 households, out of which 34.8% had children under the age of 18 living with them, 57.7% were married couples living together, 10.7% had a female householder with no husband present, and 24.9% were non-families. 19.8% of all households were made up of individuals, and 5.5% had someone living alone who was 65 years of age or older. The average household size was 2.54 and the average family size was 2.86.

In the town, the population was spread out, with 26.5% under the age of 18, 5.8% from 18 to 24, 33.0% from 25 to 44, 25.4% from 45 to 64, and 9.3% who were 65 years of age or older. The median age was 37 years. For every 100 females, there were 114.0 males. For every 100 females age 18 and over, there were 105.2 males.

The median income for a household in the town was $36,607, and the median income for a family was $41,406. Males had a median income of $32,292 versus $24,750 for females. The per capita income for the town was $20,243. About 7.6% of families and 10.4% of the population were below the poverty line, including 17.2% of those under age 18 and 8.9% of those age 65 or over.

== Notable people ==
- Joseph Plumb Martin, Revolutionary War era soldier, noted for publishing accounts of his military service
- Freeman McGilvery, Civil War era artillery officer
- Ephraim K. Smart, US congressman

== Sites of interest ==
- Fort Knox
- Penobscot Narrows Bridge and Observatory
