= Piscataqua River (Presumpscot River tributary) =

River in the United States of America

Coordinates: 43.73008°N 70.28866°W

Location
- Country: United States

Physical characteristics
- Source
  - location: Maine

The Piscataqua River (/pɪˈskætəkwə/) is an 11.9-mile-long (19.2 km) tributary of the Presumpscot River in the U.S. state of Maine. Via the Presumpscot River, it is part of the watershed of Casco Bay, an arm of the Atlantic Ocean.

It rises at the outlet of Forest Lake in the southern corner of the town of Gray, flows briefly northeast, then turns southeast and enters the town of Cumberland.

Continuing southwest, it enters Falmouth, turns more south-southeast, and reaches the Presumpscot River just north of the Interstate 495 bridge.

== See also ==
- List of rivers of Maine
