= Little River (Big Lake) =

Location
- Country: United States

Physical characteristics
- Source
  - location: Maine
- Mouth
  - location: Big Lake
  - coordinates: 45°08′56″N 67°43′34″W
  - elevation: 200 feet (60 m)
- Length: 7.1 mi (11.4 km)

The Little River is a short river in Maine. From the outflow of Little River Lake (45°09′26″N 67°48′42″W) in T.47 MD BPP, the river runs 7.1 miles (11.4 km) southeast and northeast to Big Lake in T.27 ED BPP.

Little River and its main tributary, Grand Lake Brook, provide an alternate drainage from West Grand Lake to Big Lake, in parallel to Grand Lake Stream. Big Lake drains into the Grand Falls Flowage, a reservoir created by the Grand Falls Dam on the St. Croix River in Baileyville.

== See also ==
- List of rivers of Maine
