= Little River (Drakes Island, Maine) =

Coordinates: 43.33564°N 70.53644°W

Location
- Country: United States

Physical characteristics
- Source
  - location: Maine

The Little River is a 1.6-mile-long (2.6 km) inlet of the Atlantic Ocean in southern Maine in the United States. It is formed by the juncture of the Merriland River and Branch Brook, and its course serves as the boundary between the towns of Kennebunk and Wells.

== See also ==
- List of rivers of Maine
