= Little River (Georgetown, Maine) =

Coordinates: 43.76870°N 69.74088°W

Location
- Country: United States

Physical characteristics
- Source
  - location: Maine

The Little River is a 4.0-mile-long (6.4 km) river in the town of Georgetown, Maine. It flows directly into the Atlantic Ocean, between the mouth of the Sheepscot River to the east and the Kennebec River to the west. The lower portion of its course forms the western boundary of Reid State Park.

== See also ==
- List of rivers of Maine
