= Swift River (Maine) =

Coordinates: 44.55451°N 70.54423°W

Location
- Country: United States

Physical characteristics
- Source
  - location: Maine
  - elevation: 423 ft (129 m)
- Length: 26.7 mi (43.0 km)

The Swift River is a 26.7-mile-long (43.0 km) river in western Maine. It is a tributary of the Androscoggin River, which flows to the Kennebec River near its mouth at the Atlantic Ocean.

The Swift River rises in Franklin County at the outlet of Swift River Pond, a small water body southeast of the Rangeley Lakes. The river flows south into Oxford County through the towns of Byron, Roxbury, and Mexico, ending at the Androscoggin River at the town boundary between Mexico and Rumford, and flowing through the downtown of the combined urban area formed by the two towns.

== See also ==
- List of rivers of Maine
