= West Branch Narraguagus River (Cherryfield, Maine) =

Location
- Country: United States

Physical characteristics
- Source
  - location: Maine
- Mouth
  - location: Narraguagus River
  - coordinates: 44°56′35″N 68°06′50″W
  - elevation: 50 feet (20 m)
- Length: 25 miles (40 km)

The West Branch Narraguagus River is a river in Maine. From its source (44°48′51″N 68°06′33″W) in Maine Township 22, MD, Hancock County, the river runs 25.2 miles (40.6 km) southeast to its confluence with the Narraguagus River in Cherryfield, Washington County.

== See also ==
- List of rivers of Maine
- West Branch Narraguagus River (Hancock County, Maine), which joins the parent river about 25 miles (40 km) upstream in Hancock County.
