= Sunday River (Androscoggin River tributary) =

River in Maine, U.S.

Coordinates: 44°29′59.7″N 70°55′0.9″W

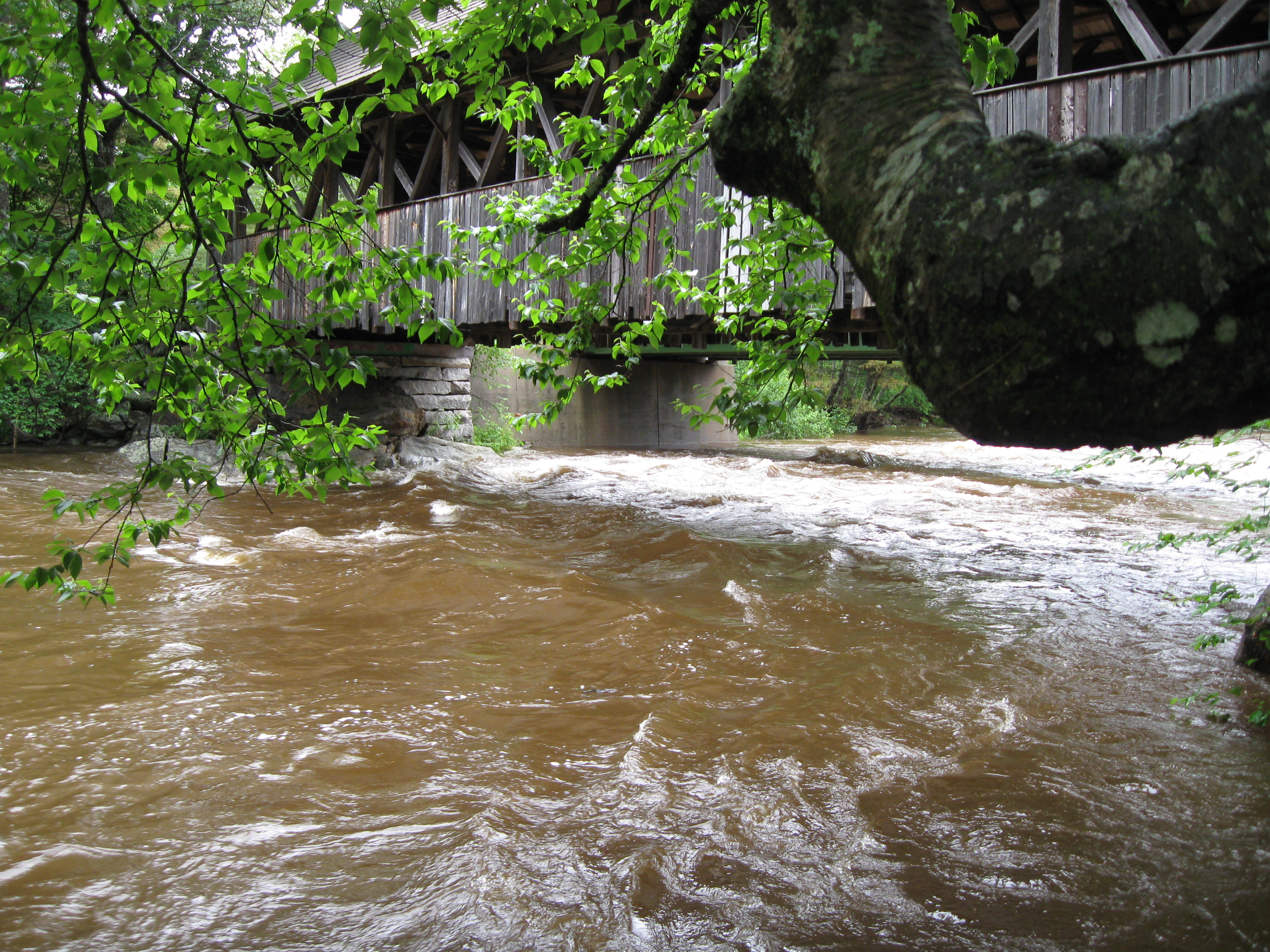
The river after a heavy rainfall.

Sunday River is a 14.1-mile-long (22.7 km) river in Oxford County, Maine in the United States. It is a tributary of the Androscoggin River, which flows east and south to join the Kennebec River in Merrymeeting Bay near the Atlantic Ocean.

Sunday River flows from headwaters near Mount Carlo in the Mahoosuc Range. The river flows east, collecting the waters of tributaries including the South Branch Sunday River, Bull Branch, Miles Notch Brook, Goose Eye Brook, Jordan Brook, Merrill Brook, Simons Brook, and others. Most of these tributaries flow southeast from the Mahoosucs. A few flow north from Bear Mountain. The Sunday River joins the Androscoggin River a few miles north of the village of Bethel.

The lower 7 miles (11 km) of Sunday River is known for canoeing. The river is rocky and swift, and contains class II-III rapids.

Near the confluence of the Sunday River and the Androscoggin River is the Sunday River Ski Resort.
