= Narramissic River =

Coordinates: 44.57952°N 68.74392°W

Location
- Country: United States

Physical characteristics
- Source
  - location: Maine

The Narramissic River is a 1.7-mile-long (2.7 km) river in Hancock County, Maine. It is the furthest downstream freshwater section in the Narramissic watershed.

The Narramissic begins at the outlet of Alamoosook Lake and flows west and southwest. It turns south at Duck Cove, just upstream of the village of Orland, where, near the end of Fish Point, at Lower Falls or "Orland" Dam, its overflow joins the tidal Orland River .

== See also ==
- List of rivers of Maine
