= Little River (Presumpscot River tributary) =

Coordinates: 43.71647°N 70.41088°W

Location
- Country: United States

Physical characteristics
- Source
  - location: Maine

The Little River is an 18.8-mile-long (30.3 km) tributary of the Presumpscot River in the U.S. state of Maine. It rises in the northern part of the town of Buxton in York County and flows southeast, then northeast into Gorham in Cumberland County. It flows northeast and east across Gorham, reaching the Presumpscot at the eastern boundary of the town, across from Windham.

== See also ==
- List of rivers of Maine
