= Presumpscot River =

River in Maine, United States

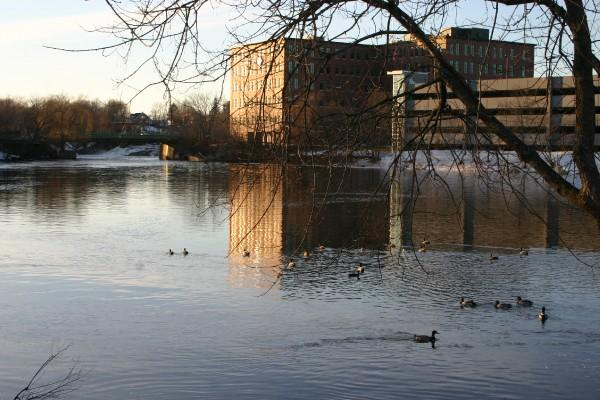
- Presumpscot River at Westbrook in January 2008

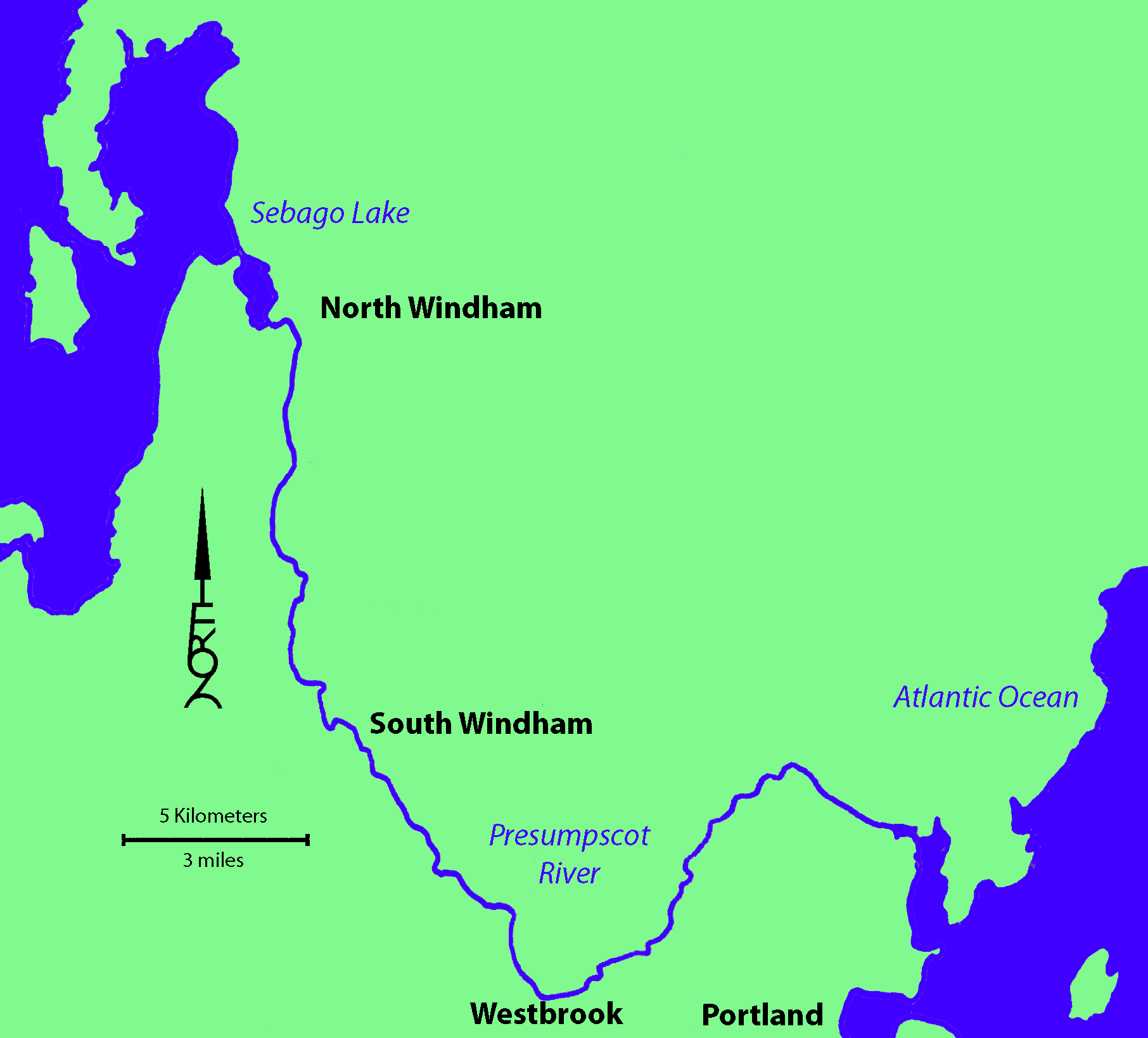

Location
- Country: United States
- State: Maine
- Region: Cumberland County

Physical characteristics
- Source: Sebago Lake
  - coordinates: 43°49′49″N 70°27′18″W
  - elevation: 270 ft (82 m)
- Mouth: Casco Bay
  - coordinates: 43°41′30″N 70°14′43″W
  - elevation: 0 ft (0 m)
- Length: 25.8 mi (41.5 km)

The Presumpscot River (/prɪˈzʌmpskət/) is a 25.8-mile-long (41.5 km) river located in Cumberland County, Maine, United States. It is the main outlet of Sebago Lake. The river provided an early transportation corridor with reliable water power for industrial development of the city of Westbrook and the village of South Windham.

== Course ==
The river flows through the communities of Standish, Windham, Gorham, Westbrook, Portland, and Falmouth before emptying into Casco Bay at Falmouth. The river is bridged by Maine State Route 35 between Standish and Windham, near North Windham, by the North Gorham to Windham Center road between Gorham and Windham, by the Maine Central Railroad Mountain Division between North Windham and South Windham, and by U.S. Route 202 in South Windham. The river is bridged again by the Maine Central Mountain Division in Westbrook and by U.S. Route 302 at Riverton between Westbrook and Portland. In Falmouth the river is bridged by the former Interstate 495, (now route 295); concurrent Maine State Routes 26 and 100, Interstate 95, Maine State Route 9, the Maine Central Railroad, Interstate 295, the Grand Trunk Railway, and U.S. Route 1.

== Sources ==
The Sebago Lake drainage basin includes the Crooked River draining Songo Pond south of Bethel, and the Bear River from Waterford through Long Lake. The basin is between the Saco River drainage basin to the west and the Androscoggin River drainage basin to the north and east. In addition to Sebago Lake's being its primary source, four significant tributaries of the river are the Pleasant River from Gray through Windham, the Little River from Buxton through Gorham, Mill Brook in Westbrook (which is an outlet of Highland Lake in Windham), and the Piscataqua River in Falmouth (which is an outlet of Forest Lake in Cumberland). An East Branch Piscataqua River flows separately into the Presumpscot main stem. The Presumpscot River drainage basin south of Sebago Lake is between the Royal River drainage basin to the east, and the Saco River and Stroudwater River drainage basins to the west and south, respectively.

Little Sebago Lake originally drained westerly into Sebago Lake through Boody Meadow and Outlet Brook. An artificial outlet was constructed through a moraine at the south end of Little Sebago Lake as an early 19th-century water power diversion to the Pleasant River via Ditch Brook. On 4 June 1814, the diversion became enlarged by erosion as the lake level dropped 50 feet (15 m) within a few hours, draining great quantities of water into the Pleasant River. The resulting flood swept away two mills and six bridges along the Pleasant and Presumpscot rivers as far downstream as South Windham. The erosion scar is bridged today by Maine State Route 115 east of North Windham. The level of Little Sebago Lake was partially restored by construction of a dam which failed with similar downstream damage on 7 May 1861, and has been subsequently rebuilt.

== Early industrial development ==
Sawmills were built on the river, at Presumpscott Falls in Falmouth, during the 1660s. The first Maine paper mill was built on the river in 1731 by General Samuel Waldo.

== Canal ==
The river was an early transportation corridor between Casco Bay and Sebago Lake. A series of dams and locks were completed in 1830 to form the Cumberland and Oxford Canal. The canal operated until replaced by the Portland and Ogdensburg Railway in 1870. The canal lock system provided elevation control of the 45-square-mile (117 km^{2}) surface area of Sebago Lake as a reservoir for water-powered mills along the river. The S. D. Warren Paper Mill in Westbrook vied with the Oriental Powder Company in Gorham and Windham to control water flow after the canal ceased operation of the locks. The paper mill exercised control for more than half a century after the gunpowder factory closed in 1905.

== Dams ==
There are seven dams impeding the flow of water as it makes its way from Sebago Lake to the ocean, some of which produce hydroelectric power 1) Eel Weir Dam (National Inventory of Dams ID number 00070, (also called the Headgates Dam) controls outflow from Sebago Lake (not to be confused with the Eel Weir Hydroelectric Project at 138 Middle Jam Rd, approximately 1.5 miles after the Headgates Dam at the source of the river, which empties Eel Weir Hydroelectric Project water into the river, but in no way impedes the river), 2) North Gorham Dam, 3) Dundee Dam, 4) Gambo Dam, 5) Little Falls Dam, 6) Mallison Dam, and 7) Cumberland Mills Dam. The Saccarappa Dam removal commenced in 2019. Since the removal of the Smelt Hill Dam in Falmouth in 2002, the last 7 miles (11 km) of the river after the Cumberland Mills Dam now flow unimpeded to the ocean.

== Conservation ==
The Presumpscot River Preserve, a 48-acre nature preserve, is located in North Deering alongside the Presumpscot River. It was purchased and preserved in 2001 by the Land for Maine's Future program as well as the City Land Bank Commission and Portland Trails.

In August 2014, Portland Trails preserved 20 acres of land in the Presumpscot River estuary in Falmouth around Mile Pond.

== Bibliography ==
- Barnes, Diane; Barnes, Jack (1996). The Sebago Lake Area. Acadia Publishing. ISBN 978-0-7385-4943-9.
- The Maine Atlas and Gazetteer (Thirteenth ed.). Freeport, Maine: DeLorme Mapping Company. 1988. ISBN 0-89933-035-5.
- Jones, Robert C. (1993). Two Feet to the Lakes, The Bridgton & Saco River Railroad. Pacific Fast Mail.
- Moody, Linwood W. (1959). The Maine Two-Footers. Howell-North.
- Meade, Edgar T. Jr. (1968). Busted and Still Running. The Stephen Greene Press.
- Ward, Ernest E. (1967). My First Sixty Years in Harrison, Maine. Cardinal Printing.
