= Machias River (Aroostook River tributary) =

Location
- Country: United States

Physical characteristics
- Source
  - location: Maine
- Mouth
  - location: Aroostook River
  - coordinates: 46°37′19″N 68°25′17″W
  - elevation: 530 feet (160 m)
- Length: 33 mi (53 km)

Basin features
- Progression: Aroostook — St. John — Bay of Fundy

The Machias River is a major tributary of the Aroostook River, flowing 33.4 miles (53.8 km) through Aroostook County in the northern part of the state of Maine, USA. From the outflow of Big Machias Lake (46°40′45″N 68°45′54″W) in Maine Township 12, Range 8, WELS, the river runs southeast and east to its confluence with the Aroostook in Ashland.

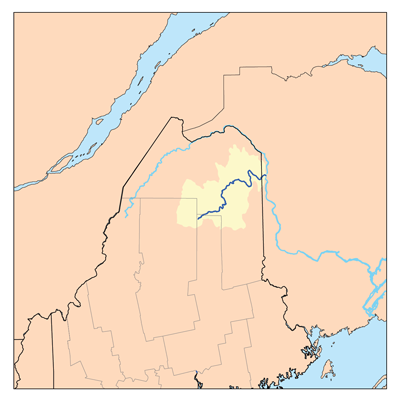
The Aroostook River watershed

== See also ==
- List of Maine rivers
