= St. Croix Stream =

River in Maine, United States

Location
- Country: United States

Physical characteristics
- Source
  - location: Maine
- Mouth
  - location: Aroostook River
  - elevation: 540 feet (160 m)
- Length: about 19 miles (31 km)

St. Croix Stream is an 18.8-mile-long (30.3 km) river in Aroostook County, Maine. From the outflow of St. Croix Lake (46°18′18″N 68°12′29″W) in St. Croix Township (Township 8, Range 4, WELS), the river runs northwest to the Aroostook River in Masardis. Via the Aroostook River, St. Croix Stream is part of the Saint John River watershed.

== See also ==
- List of rivers of Maine
