= Dead River (Androscoggin River tributary) =

River in Maine, United States

Coordinates: 44°21′58″N 70°10′0″W

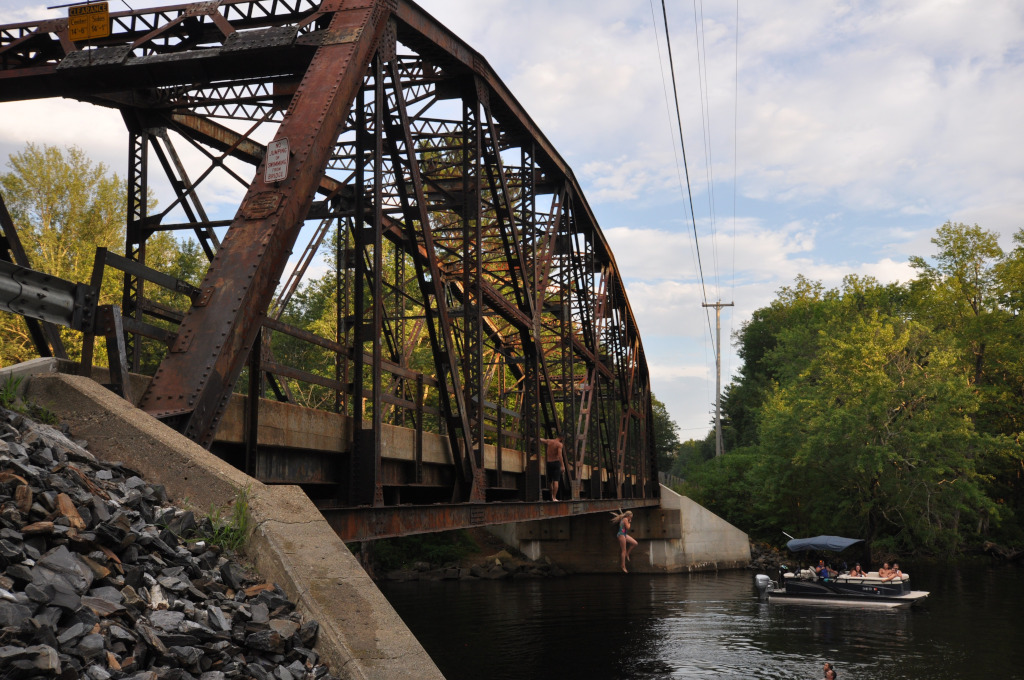
People jump from the SR 106 bridge into the Dead River in Leeds

The Dead River is a tributary of the Androscoggin River in western Maine in the United States. The river flows from Androscoggin Lake, northwest through the town of Leeds 7 miles (11 km) to the Androscoggin.
