= Englishman Bay =

Bay in Washington County, Maine, US

Coordinates: 44°36′N 67°29′W

Englishman Bay is a bay in Washington County, Maine.

The bay is located between the towns of Roque Bluffs and Jonesport. It is separated from Chandler Bay to the southwest by Roque Island and Great Spruce Island.

The bay extends roughly 8 miles (13 km) and is 3 miles (5 km) at its widest.
