= Machias Bay =

Bay in Washington County, Maine

- Location within Maine Location within the United States
- Location: Washington County, Maine, United States
- Coordinates: 44°38′N 67°20′W
- Part of: Gulf of Maine
- River sources: Machias River
- Max. length: 7 miles (11 km)
- Max. width: 4 miles (6.4 km)
- Surface elevation: 0 feet (0 m)
- Islands: Cross Island
- Settlements: Machias, Machiasport

Machias Bay is a bay in Washington County, Maine that opens into the Gulf of Maine. The bay was the scene of the Battle of Machias — the first naval battle of the American Revolution, occasioned by the British need for lumber for Boston.

Located at the mouth of the Machias River between the towns of Machiasport, Machias, East Machias, Whiting, and Cutler, it is separated from Little Machias Bay to the east by the Cutler Peninsula, from Little Kennebec Bay to the west by the Point of Maine, and from the Gulf of Maine to the south by Cross Island and the Libby Islands.

The bay extends roughly 7 mi. (12 km) and is 4 mi. (6 km) at its widest.
