= Machias River =

River in Maine, USA

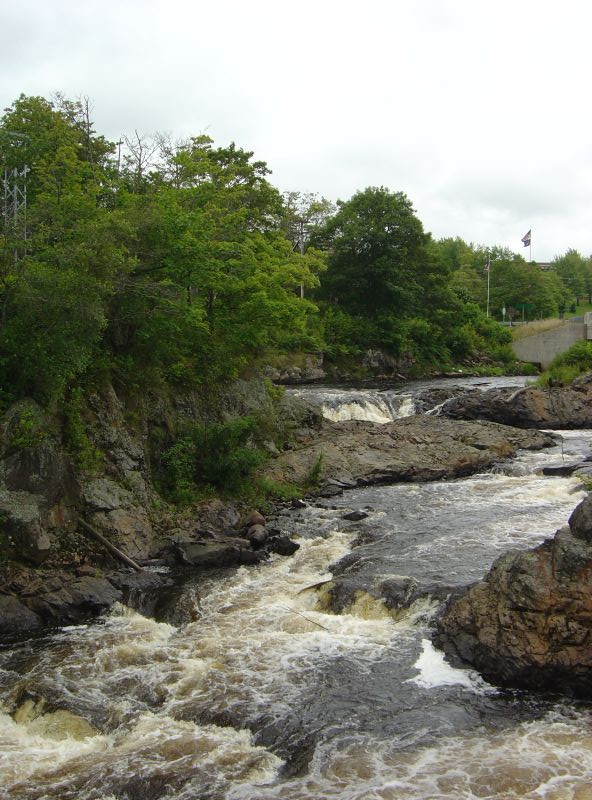
- Bad Little Falls

Location
- Country: United States

Physical characteristics
- Source
  - location: Western Washington County, Maine
  - elevation: 1,371 feet (418 m)
- Mouth
  - location: Machias Bay
  - elevation: 0 feet (0 m)
- Length: 60 mi (97 km)
- Basin size: 498.3 mi^{2} (1,291 km^{2})

Video of Little Bad Falls in Machias, Maine

The Machias River is a 60.0-mile-long (96.6 km) river in Maine, USA. It flows through Washington County in the eastern part of the state, from Fifth Machias Lake (45°05′21″N 67°51′49″W), passing the town of Machias and emptying into Machias Bay.

== History ==
The name is believed to derive from a Passamaquoddy word meaning "bad run of water" or "bad little falls", either of which does describe the difficulty of canoeing some of the rapids in the river. The river was used as a seasonal migration route by Indians. The first European settlement is believed to have been an English trading post in 1633, almost immediately destroyed by the French. The first permanent settlement in the area in 1763 was intended to be a site for the production of lumber, with 1.6 million board feet produced in 1764. The river mouth and offshore waters were the scene of the Battle of Machias — the first naval battle of the American Revolution, occasioned by the British need for lumber for Boston. Lumber remained a main industry along the river, with the river powering the sawmills. Production was as high as 40 million feet in a year, but declined in the late 19th century to between 10 and 20 million feet per year (with a similar amount of lath also produced). The woods cut were originally pine, and later also hemlock and spruce. Natural water flow in the river varies seasonally, so dams were built to power the mills. The last dam was breached in 1973, and fully removed in 2000.

== See also ==
- List of Maine rivers
