= Androscoggin River =

River in New Hampshire and Maine, United States

Androscoggin River Aləssíkαntekʷ
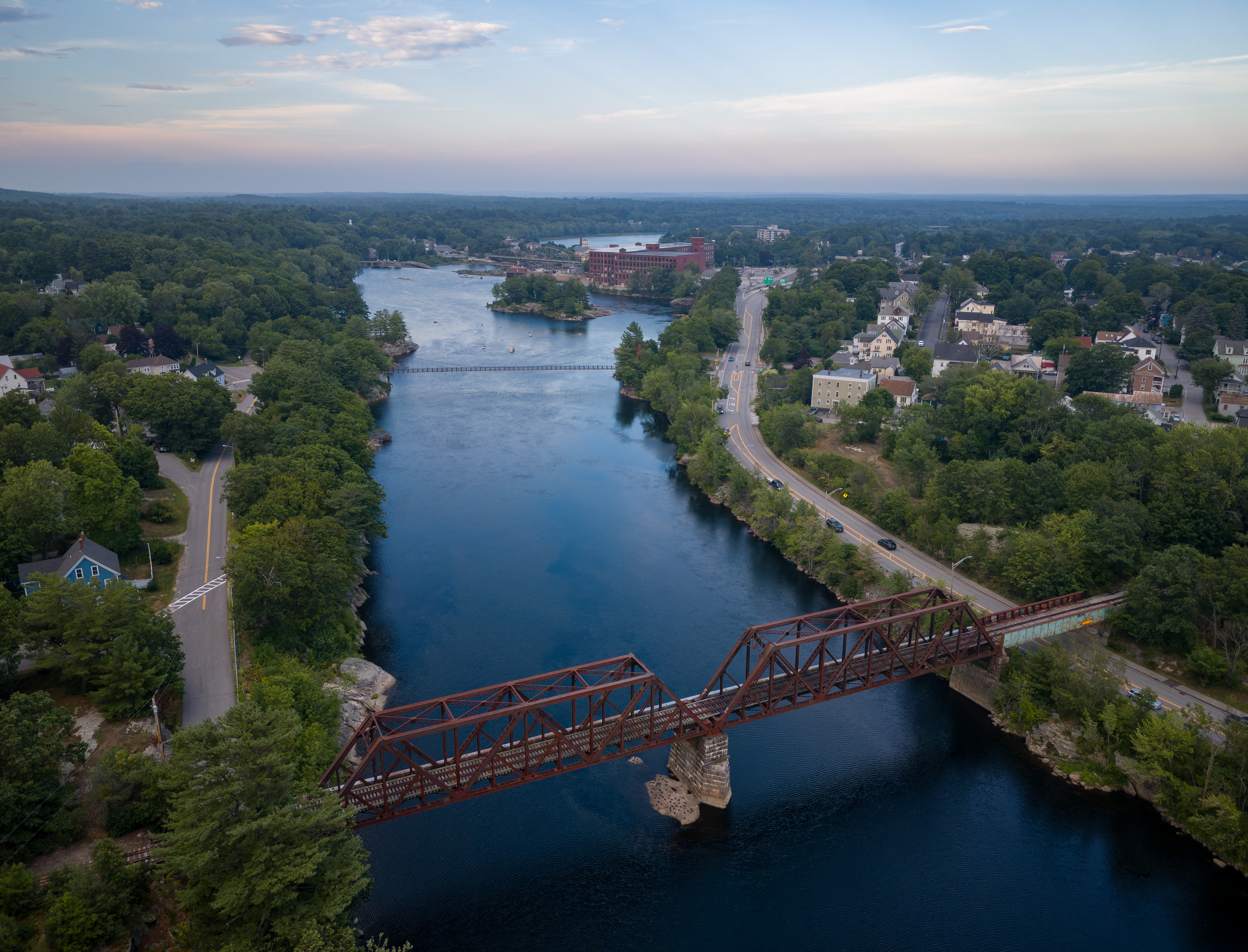
- The Androscoggin in Brunswick, Maine

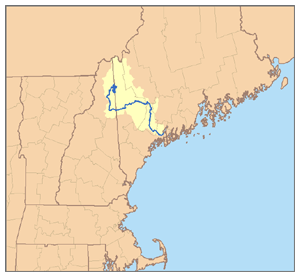
- Map of the Androscoggin River watershed

Location
- Country: United States
- State: Maine, New Hampshire
- Cities: Auburn, Lewiston, Berlin

Physical characteristics
- Source: Umbagog Lake
  - location: Coos County, New Hampshire
  - coordinates: 44°46′59″N 71°3′41″W
  - elevation: 1,243 ft (379 m)
- Mouth: Kennebec River
  - location: Merrymeeting Bay, Sagadahoc County, Maine
  - coordinates: 43°57′2″N 69°52′39″W
  - elevation: 0 ft (0 m)
- Length: 164 mi (264 km)
- Basin size: 3,450 sq mi (8,900 km^{2})
- Discharge
  - location: Auburn
  - average: 6,174 cu ft/s (174.8 m^{3}/s)
  - minimum: 340 cu ft/s (9.6 m^{3}/s)
  - maximum: 135,000 cu ft/s (3,800 m^{3}/s)
- Discharge
  - location: mouth
  - average: 6,482 cu ft/s (183.5 m^{3}/s)

Basin features
- Tributaries
  - left: Sunday River, Dead River
  - right: Magalloway River, Peabody River, Wild River

The Androscoggin River (Abenaki: Ammoscongon) is a river in the U.S. states of Maine and New Hampshire, in northern New England. It is 178 miles (286 km) long and joins the Kennebec River at Merrymeeting Bay in Maine before its water empties into the Gulf of Maine on the Atlantic Ocean. Its drainage basin is 3,530 square miles (9,100 km^{2}) in area. The name "Androscoggin" comes from the Eastern Abenaki term Ammoscongon, which referred to the entire portion of the river north of the Great Falls in Lewiston, Maine. The Anglicization of the Abenaki term is likely an analogical contamination with the colonial governor Edmund Andros.

== History ==
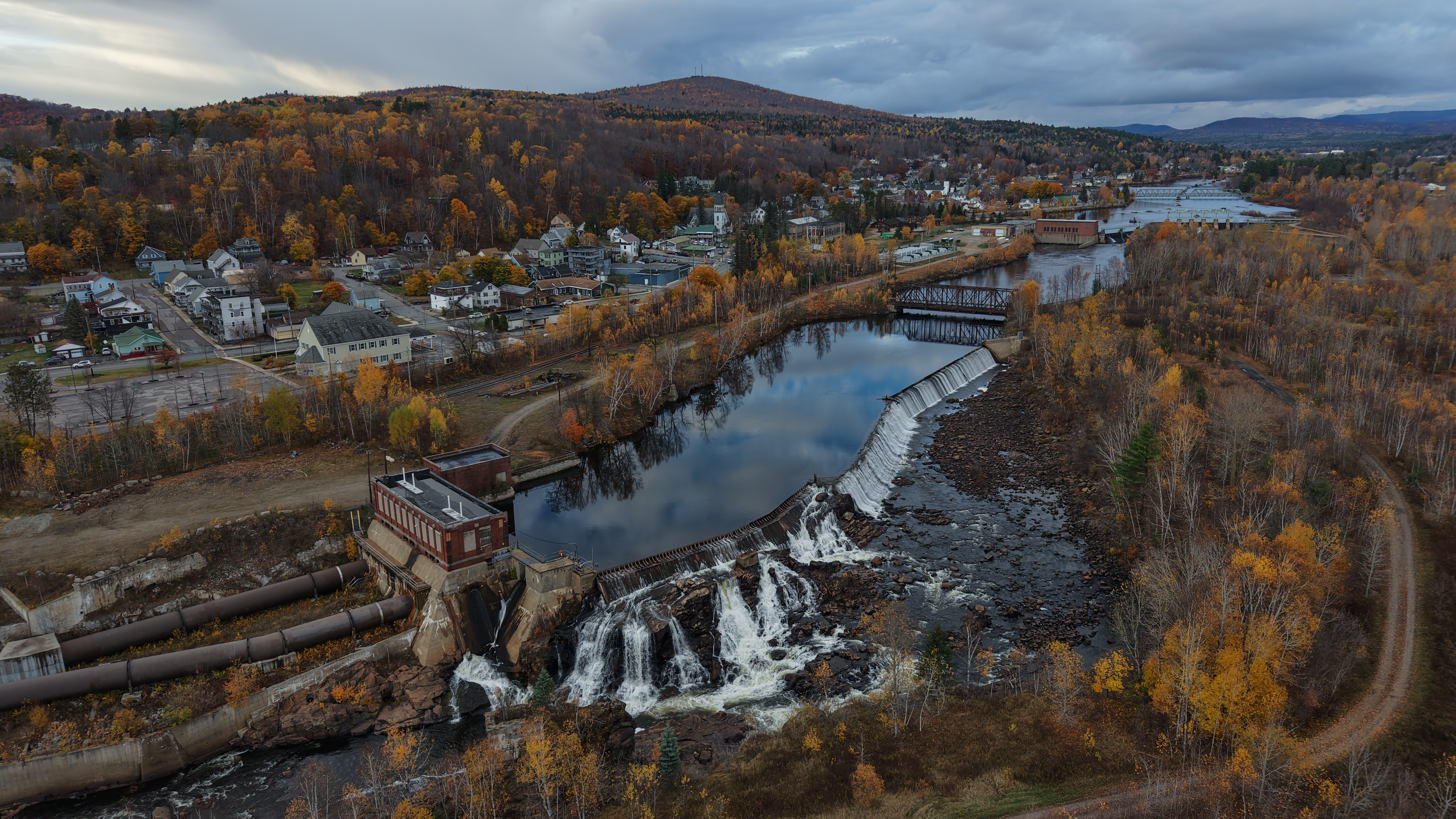
The Androscoggin River in Berlin, NH

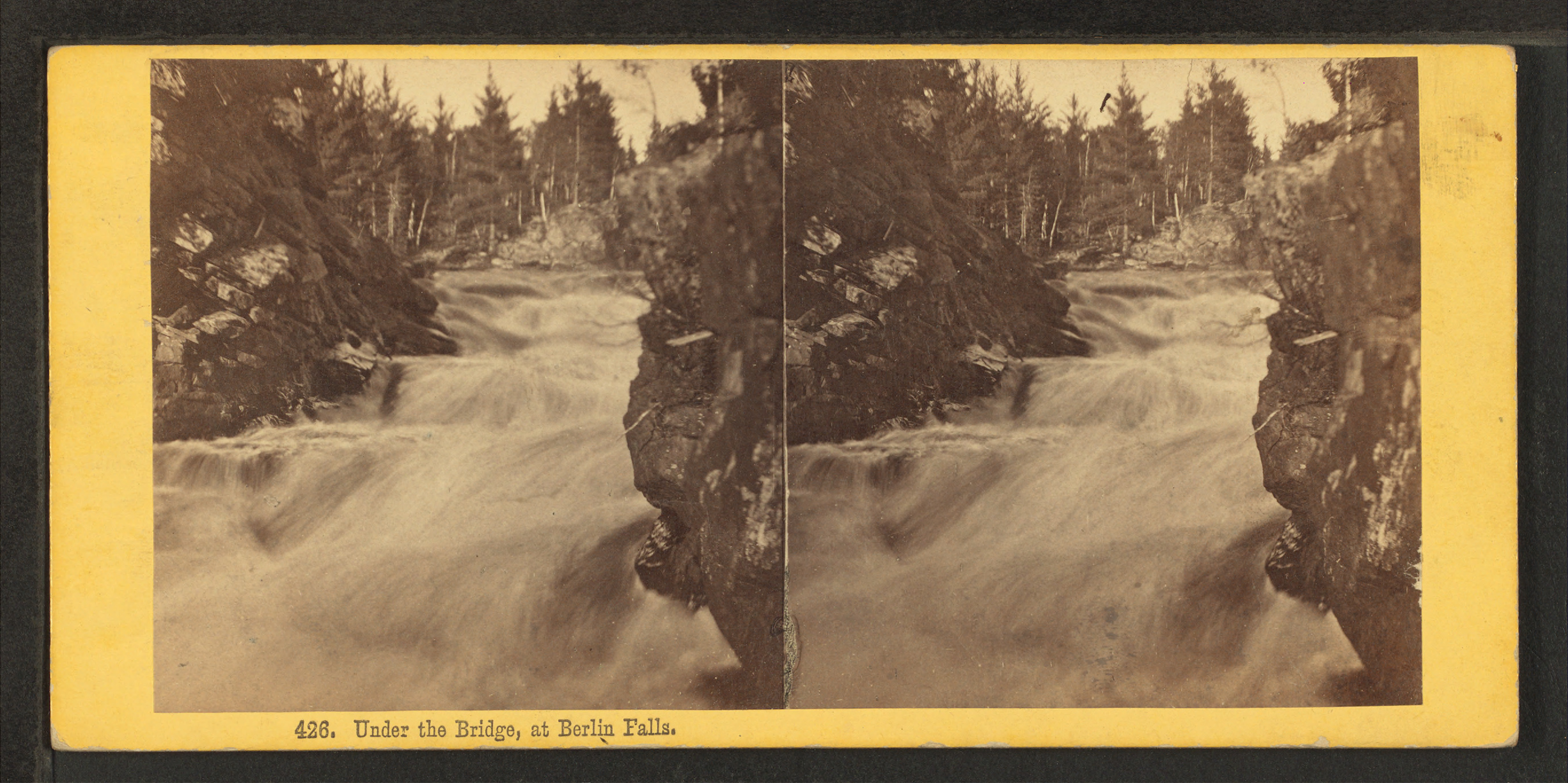
Stereoscopic image Under the bridge at Berlin Falls, by the Bierstadt Brothers

There were several ancient names for the river. The Androscoggin was known as Pejepscook from Merrymeeting Bay to the Great Falls, with its namesake deriving from an anglicization of the section of river from the Great Falls northward.

According to the USGS, variant names for the Androscoggin River include Amasagu'nteg, Amascongan, Ambrose Coggin, Ammeriscoggin, Ammoscoggin, Amos Coggin, Amoscommun, Anasagunticook, Anconganunticook, Andrews Coggin, Andros Coggan, Andros Coggin, Androscoggen, Andrus Coggin, Aumoughcaugen, and Ameriscoggin River.

The average Androscoggin drop of eight feet per mile (1.5m per km) made it an excellent source of water power encouraging development of the cities of Berlin, New Hampshire, and Lewiston and Auburn, Maine, and the Maine towns of Brunswick, Topsham, Lisbon Falls, Livermore Falls, Chisholm, Mexico, Rumford and Bethel.

=== Water quality ===
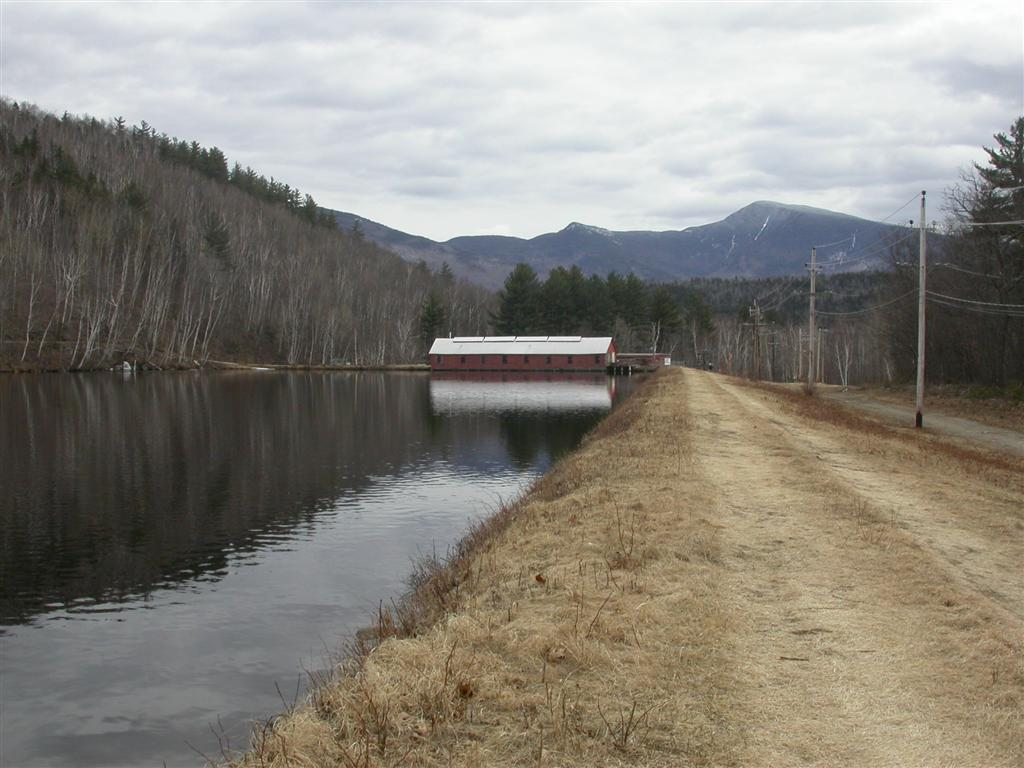
Power canal along the Androscoggin River in Gorham, New Hampshire

The Androscoggin was once heavily polluted by a variety of textile mills, paper mills, and other industries located along its banks, and helped inspire the Clean Water Act. The river has benefited greatly from environmental work and the departure of certain types of industry from the region. As a result, the amount of contaminated wastewater being released into the river has greatly decreased. However, several mills still release chemical waste into the river, albeit in much smaller amounts. From the 1940s through the 2000s, the Androscoggin was so polluted that some environmental groups listed it as one of the 20 most polluted rivers in the United States. The pollution became so severe that until very recently, one 14-mile (23 km) stretch required oxygen bubblers to prevent fish from suffocating. As of May 2007, environmental groups had a lawsuit pending, in an attempt to force the paper mills located along the river to clean their waste streams. Most companies have agreed and generally followed through on reducing the amount of wastewater discharge, but only a few have completely stopped, with many companies citing cost as a prime factor for continued pollution.

On April 15, 2020, a large explosion occurred at the Verso Paper Mill, located on the river. It is unknown what impacts, either negative or positive, the explosion and the mill's indefinite closing will have on water quality.

== Course ==
The Androscoggin begins in Errol, New Hampshire, where the Magalloway River joins the outlet of Umbagog Lake. The river flows generally south but with numerous bends past the towns of Errol and Milan and the city of Berlin before turning east at the town of Gorham, New Hampshire, to cut across the northern end of the White Mountains and enter Maine. Continuing east, the river passes the towns of Bethel, Rumford, and Dixfield before turning south at the town of Livermore Falls and leaving the mountains behind. The river passes through the twin cities of Lewiston and Auburn, turns southeast, passes the community of Lisbon Falls and reaches tidewater just below the final falls in the town of Brunswick. Merrymeeting Bay is a 10-mile-long (16 km) freshwater estuary where the Androscoggin meets the Kennebec River nearly 20 miles (32 km) inland from the Atlantic Ocean.

=== Major tributaries ===
Listed from source to mouth of Androscoggin, with location of tributary's mouth:

- Magalloway River, Errol, New Hampshire
- Clear Stream, Errol, New Hampshire
- Mollidgewock Brook, Errol, New Hampshire
- Chickwolnepy Stream, Milan, New Hampshire
- Dead River, Berlin, New Hampshire
- Moose Brook, Gorham, New Hampshire
- Moose River, Gorham, New Hampshire
- Peabody River, Gorham, New Hampshire
- Wild River, Gilead, Maine
- Pleasant River, Bethel, Maine
- Alder River, Bethel, Maine
- Sunday River, Bethel, Maine
- Bear River, Newry, Maine
- Ellis River, Rumford, Maine
- Concord River, Rumford, Maine
- Swift River, Rumford and Mexico, Maine
- Webb River, Dixfield, Maine
- Dead River, Leeds, Maine
- Nezinscot River, Turner, Maine
- Little Androscoggin River, Auburn, Maine
- Sabattus River, Lisbon, Maine
- Little River, Lisbon Falls, Maine

== Recreation ==
=== Angling ===
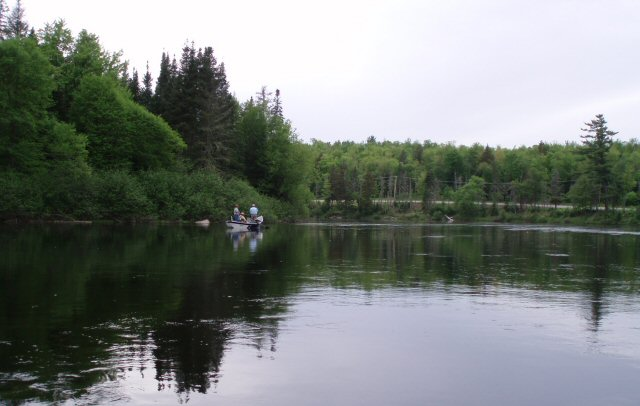
Drift boat fly-fishing in Errol, New Hampshire

The Androscoggin River is a popular fishing destination for anglers. The upper section of the river offers good fly fishing for brook, rainbow and brown trout. Landlocked salmon can also be caught in the far northern portions of the river near Errol, New Hampshire. As the river progresses south and east of the White Mountains, the river widens some and the water quality becomes more acidic. As a result of these changes, the trout and salmon fisheries vanish almost entirely in the central and lower portions of the river. However, these sections often contain trophy smallmouth bass fisheries. Northern pike also inhabit the lower sections, with quality specimens being reported for this species as well. Other species found in the lower portions include redbreast sunfish, yellow perch, and white suckers.

=== Paddling ===
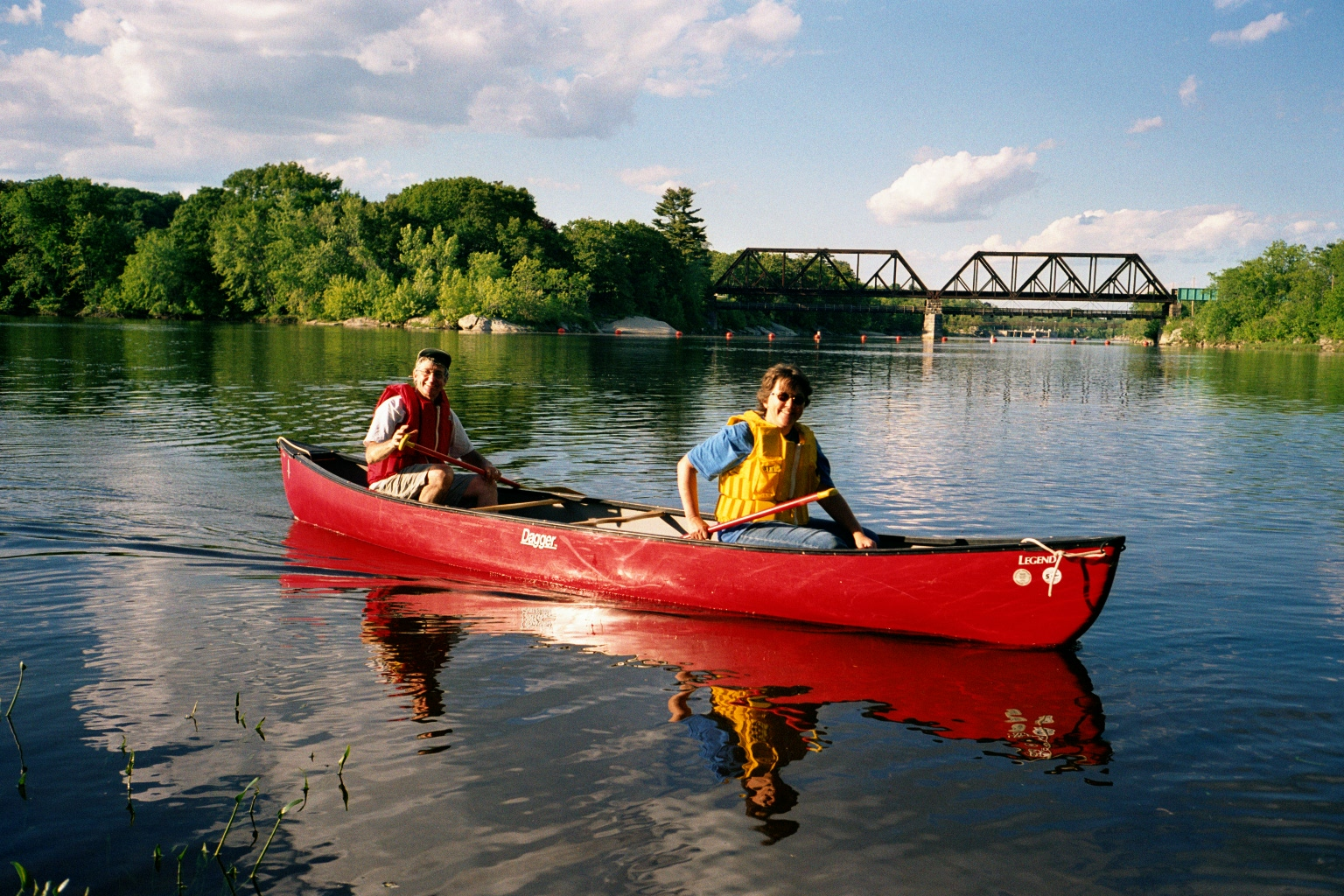
Paddling near the Free-Black Bridge in Brunswick, Maine

The Androscoggin River Watershed Council, a local nonprofit, has been working to establish a water trail along the entire length of the river. The trail will provide improved portages and access sites for paddling, fishing, and boating. There are currently over 40 mapped public access sites to the river.

The Androscoggin Riverlands State Park in Maine is a popular area for paddling. It consists of 12 miles (19 km) along the western shoreline of the river just east of Turner.

== Streamflow ==
The U.S. Geological Survey (USGS) maintains four river flow gauges on the Androscoggin River. All four are below one or more dams.

The first is at Errol, New Hampshire (44°46′57″N 71°07′46″W), where the watershed is 1,046 square miles (2,710 km^{2}). Flow here has ranged from 16,500 to 0 ft^{3}/s (467 and 0 m^{3}/s) (zero flow when dam closed). The mean annual flow between 1905 and 2005 is 1,919 ft^{3}/s (54.3 m^{3}/s).

The second is near Gorham, New Hampshire (44°26′10″N 71°11′27″W), where the watershed is 1,361 square miles (3,520 km^{2}). Flow here has ranged from 21,900 to a mean daily low of 795 ft^{3}/s (620 and 22.5 m^{3}/s) (lows when dam closed). The mean annual flow between 1905 and 2005 is 2,512 ft^{3}/s (71 m^{3}/s).

The third is at Rumford, Maine (44°33′04″N 70°32′38″W), where the watershed is 2,068 square miles (5,360 km^{2}). Flow here has ranged from 74,000 to 625 ft^{3}/s (2,094 and 17.7 m^{3}/s). The mean annual flow between 1905 and 2005 is 3,801 ft^{3}/s (107.6 m^{3}/s).

The fourth is at Auburn, Maine (44°04′20″N 70°12′31″W), where the watershed is 3,263 square miles (8,450 km^{2}). Flow here has ranged from 135,000 to 340 ft^{3}/s (3,820.5 and 9.6 m^{3}/s).
