= List of covered bridges in Maine =

This is a partial list of wooden covered bridges in the U.S. state of Maine.

== Bridges ==
=== Extant ===
Name	Image	Location (in Maine)	Built	Length	Truss	Notes
Babb's Bridge	Babb's Bridge	South Windham	1864, 1976	79 feet (24 m)	Queen	Original bridge was burned by vandals in 1973. An exact replica was constructed and opened to traffic in 1976.
Hemlock Bridge	Hemlock Bridge	Fryeburg	1857	109 feet (33 m)	Paddleford truss with arch	Is remote, far down on Hemlock Bridge Road at the end of Frog Alley Road (a seasonal road gated in winter), off Route 5 North. Car and foot traffic.
Lowes Bridge	Image of the Lowes Covered Bridge from the south entrance.	Guilford-Sangerville	1857, 1990	146 feet (45 m)	Long	Washed away by the flood of April 1, 1987. A modern covered bridge, patterned after the original, was built on the original abutments in 1990.
Robyville Bridge	Robyville Bridge	Corinth	1876	73 feet (22 m)	Long	Only completely shingled covered bridge in the State.
Bennett Bridge	Bennett Bridge	Lincoln Plantation	1901	93 feet (28 m)	Paddleford truss	Spans the Magalloway River.
Lovejoy Bridge	Lovejoy Bridge	Andover	1868	70 feet (21 m)	Paddleford truss	Spans the Ellis River and is Maine's shortest covered bridge.
Porter-Parsonfield Bridge	Porter-Parsonfield Bridge	Porter	1859	160 feet (49 m)	Paddleford truss	Built by the towns of Porter and Parsonfield as a joint project over the Ossipee River and was refurbished in 1999. It runs parallel to Route 160 just below Porter. Foot traffic only.
Sunday River Bridge	Sunday River Bridge	Newry	1872	99 feet (30 m)	Paddleford truss	Named the Artist's Bridge because of its reputation as being the most photographed and painted of the venerable covered bridges in Maine.
Trout Brook Bridge		Alna	2018	47 feet (14 m)	Boxed pony Howe	After a New Hampshire covered bridge was burned by vandals, a covered bridge preservation group acquired the remains of the bridge and used them to erect the Trout Brook Bridge

=== Former ===
Name	Image	Location (in Maine)	Built	Length	Truss	Notes
Union Falls Bridge	Union Falls Bridge	Dayton	1860	112 feet (34 m)	Unknown	A covered bridge built at Union Falls, a village that used to be in Dayton. It was blown up in 1921.
Watson Settlement Bridge	Watson Bridge	Littleton	1911	170 feet (52 m)	Howe	Farthest north and the youngest of Maine's original covered bridges. Destroyed by fire on July 19, 2021.

== See also ==
- List of bridges on the National Register of Historic Places in Maine
- World Guide to Covered Bridges
