= Arch Bridge =

Arch Bridge may refer to:

- An arch bridge
- Arch Bridge (Bristol, Maine), listed on the National Register of Historic Places
- Arch Bridge (Bellows Falls), Vermont and New Hampshire
- Oregon City Bridge, alternatively known as the Arch Bridge

== Types of arch bridges ==
- Fuling Arch Bridge
- Godavari Arch Bridge
- Hayden Arch Bridge
- Hulme Arch Bridge
- Humber Bay Arch Bridge
- Stone Arch Bridge (disambiguation)
