= Porter-Parsonsfield Bridge =

- U.S. National Register of Historic Places
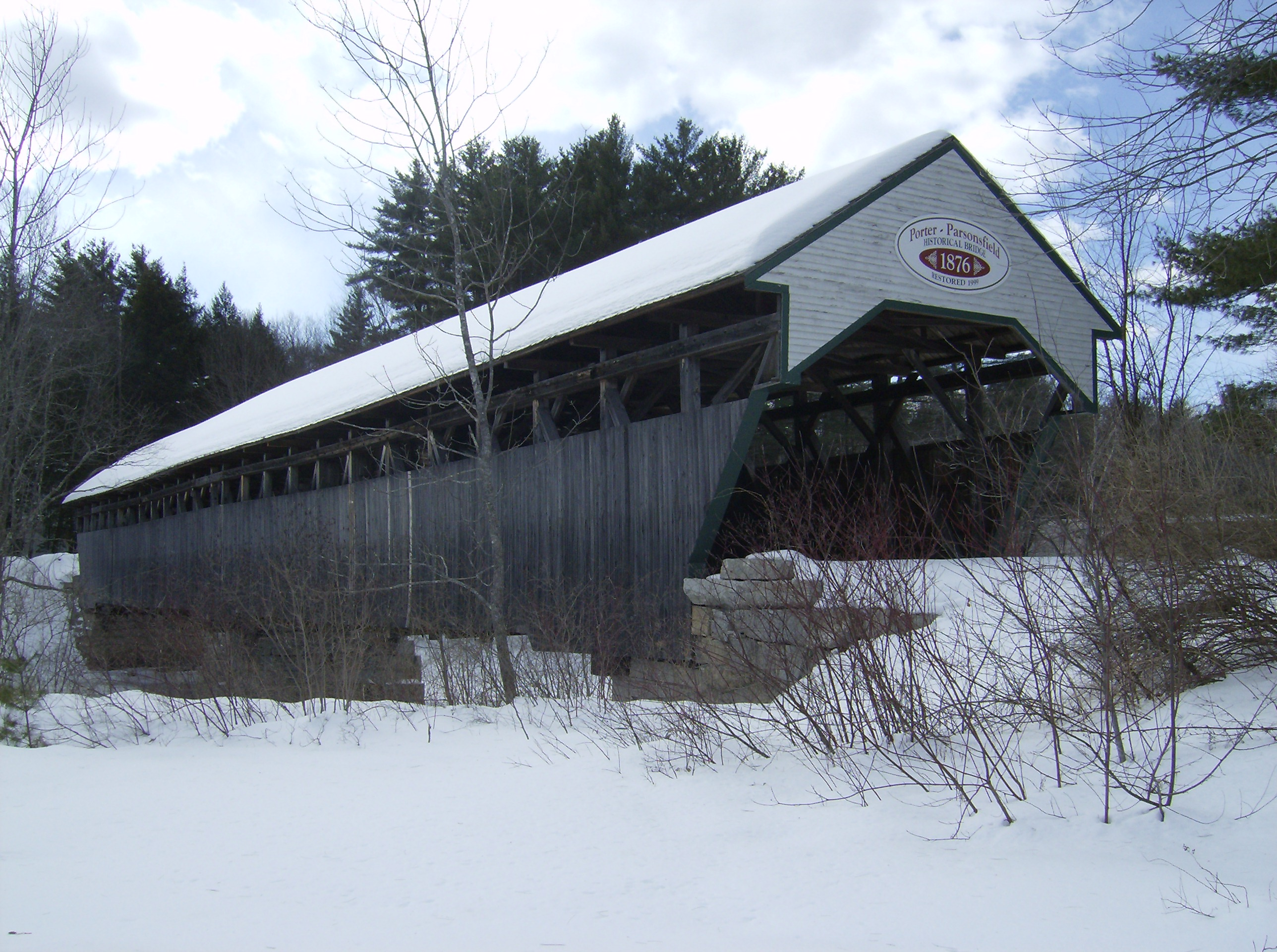

- Location within Maine Location within the United States
- Nearest city: Porter, Maine
- Coordinates: 43°47′30″N 70°56′18″W
- Area: less than one acre
- Built: 1876
- Architectural style: Paddleford Truss
- NRHP reference No.: 70000058
- Added to NRHP: February 16, 1970

The Porter-Parsonsfield Bridge is a covered bridge in western Maine, and one of the few 19th-century covered bridges left in the state. The bridge spans the Ossipee River just east of the modern alignment of North Road (Maine State Route 160), which it formerly carried, between the towns of Porter and Parsonsfield. Built in 1876 by the towns, it is a Paddleford truss bridge which has been strengthened with laminated arches. The bridge was closed to traffic in 1960, and is now maintained by the state. It was listed on the National Register of Historic Places in 1970.

== Description and history ==
The bridge has two spans, resting on granite block abutments and a central pier. The total length of the bridge is 152 feet (46 m), and it is 26 feet (7.9 m) from the flooring to the peak of the gable roof. The total width is 22 feet (6.7 m); the portals have an internal width of 18 feet (5.5 m) and height of 15 feet 6 inches (4.72 m). The bridge trusses are from a design by Peter Paddleford, a modification of the more common Long truss. The laminated arches, a 20th-century addition, consist of 21 layers of planking bolted together, to which the King posts of the truss have also been fastened. The sides of the bridge are sheathed in vertical boarding to two-thirds of the height. The roof is made of cedar shingles.

The first bridge to join the small towns of Porter and Parsonsfield at this site was completed in 1800. The site is one where the Ossipee River flows slowly, but accelerates just downstream, as it heads toward Kezar Falls. A second bridge was built in 1808, and a third in 1858. Construction of the third bridge inaugurated a dispute between the towns over how much of the bridge each town should pay for. Eventually an agreement was reached, but the bad blood between the towns meant that, when this bridge was built in 1876, they could not agree on roofing materials, and the two portions of the bridge were differently shingled. The bridge was closed to vehicular traffic in 1960, when the present alignment of North Road was built, and the state took over the bridge's maintenance in 1967. Around that time, the present roof was built, and the bridge underwent a major restoration.

== See also ==
- National Register of Historic Places listings in Oxford County, Maine
- National Register of Historic Places listings in York County, Maine
- List of bridges on the National Register of Historic Places in Maine
- List of covered bridges in Maine
