= Sunday River Bridge =

- U.S. National Register of Historic Places
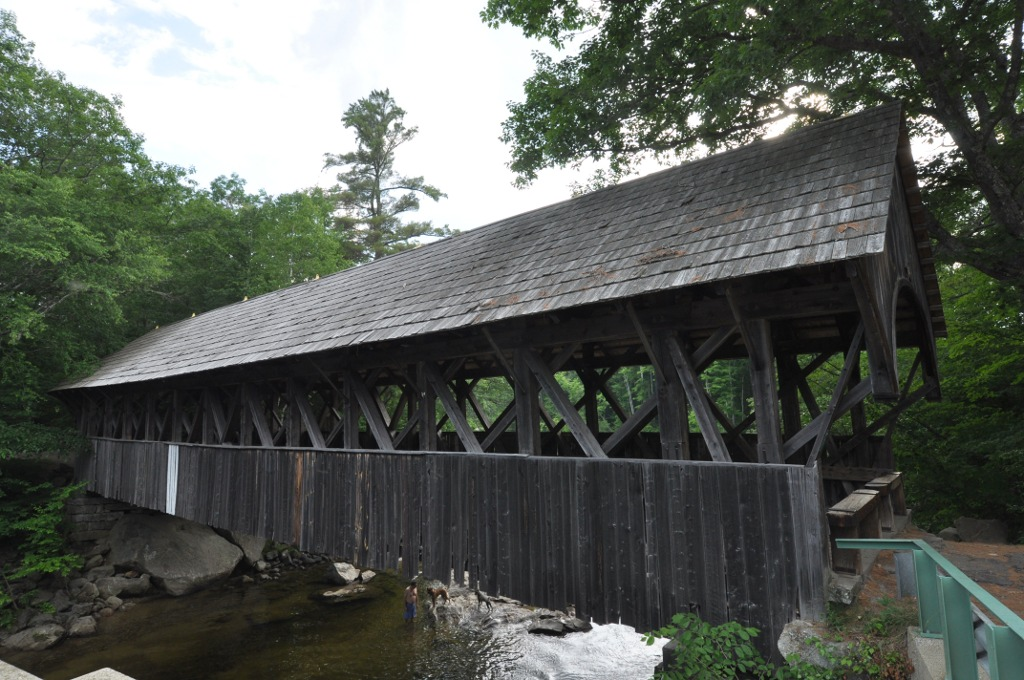

- Location within Maine Location within the United States
- Nearest city: Newry, Maine
- Coordinates: 44°29′32″N 70°50′36″W
- Area: 0.3 acres (0.12 ha)
- Built: 1872
- Architect: York, Hiram; Eames, Levi
- Architectural style: Paddleford Truss
- NRHP reference No.: 70000059
- Added to NRHP: February 16, 1970

The Sunday River Bridge, also known locally as the Artists Bridge, is a historic covered bridge in Newry, Maine. It is located northeast of the Sunday River Ski Resort, adjacent to the crossing of the Sunday River by Sunday River Road, which the bridge formerly carried. Built in 1872, it is one of Maine's few surviving 19th-century covered bridges. The bridge was listed on the National Register of Historic Places in 1970.

== Description and history ==
The Sunday River Bridge is a Paddleford truss bridge spanning the Sunday River in western Newry, Maine, a small town in western Oxford County. It is 100 feet (30 m) long and 20 feet (6.1 m) wide, with a total height of 22 feet (6.7 m), and rests on cut granite abutments. Its internal clearance is 14 feet (4.3 m) in height and 17 feet (5.2 m) in width. The trusses consist of a series of crossed braces between King posts. The bridge has an extended gable roof clad in wood shingles. The sides are finished in vertical boarding for about half their height, and the ends are boarded from the gable down to the tops of the portals.

The first bridge on the site, funded by the town (as were all subsequent bridges), was built in 1811. That bridge was washed away in spring flooding in 1869, and a replacement built in 1871 collapsed that same fall. This bridge was built in 1872, with careful attention to its structural stability. A major spring flooding event in 1927 washed out many bridges in the region, but this bridge was spared because the floodwaters bypassed its foundations. The bridge was bypassed by a realignment of Sunday River Road in 1955, and is now open to pedestrian traffic.

== See also ==
- Foster Family Home, which stands nearby
- List of bridges documented by the Historic American Engineering Record in Maine
- List of bridges on the National Register of Historic Places in Maine
- List of Maine covered bridges
- National Register of Historic Places listings in Oxford County, Maine
