= Hemlock Bridge =

- U.S. National Register of Historic Places
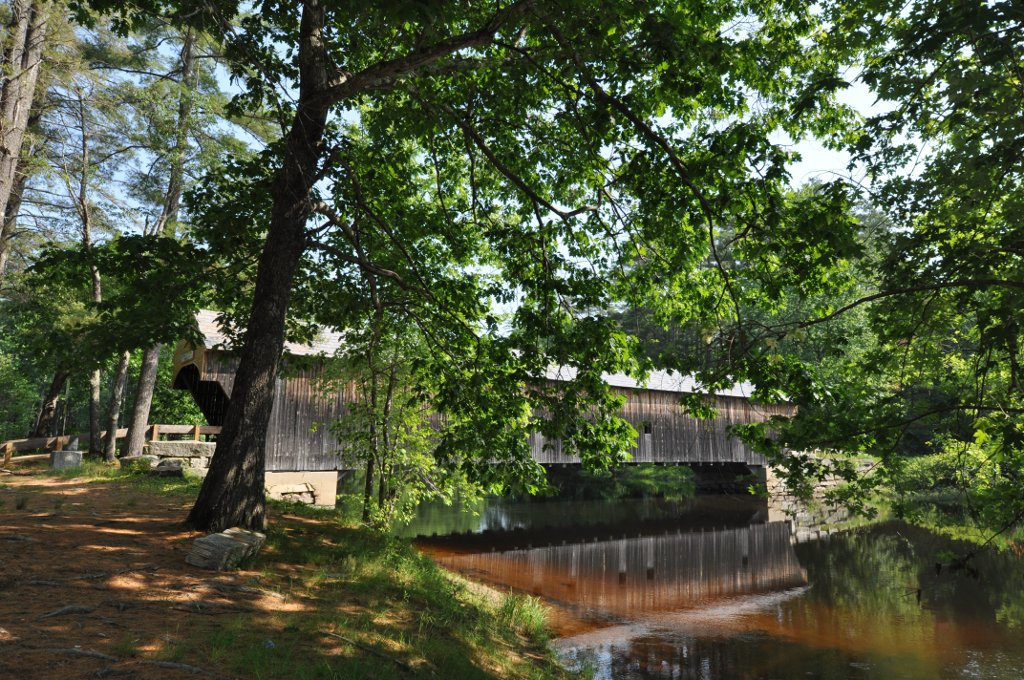

- Location within Maine Location within the United States
- Nearest city: Fryeburg Center, Maine
- Coordinates: 44°4′46″N 70°54′13″W
- Area: 0.3 acres (0.12 ha)
- Built: 1857
- Architectural style: Paddleford Truss
- NRHP reference No.: 70000056
- Added to NRHP: February 16, 1970

The Hemlock Bridge is a covered bridge in a rural part of Fryeburg, Maine. Built in 1857, it carries Hemlock Bridge Road over the Old Course Saco River, near the western shore of Kezar Lake in eastern Fryeburg. It is the last surviving 19th-century covered (of seven built) in Fryeburg. It was listed on the National Register of Historic Places in 1970 and designated as a Maine Historic Civil Engineering Landmark by the American Society of Civil Engineers in 2002.

== Description ==
The Hemlock Bridge is a single-span Paddleford truss bridge with a total length of 116 feet (35 m). Its total height, from deck to gable peak, is 20 feet (6.1 m), with an internal clearance of 14 feet (4.3 m). The roadbed is 16 feet (4.9 m) wide. The bridge rests on granite block abutments at a mean height of 15 feet (4.6 m) above the river bed. The Old Course Saco River, which the bridge spans, is a remnant of the original course of the Saco River, which was bypassed by canal-digging in the early 19th century.

The bridge was one of seven covered bridges erected in Fryeburg in the 19th century, all crossing the Saco River, whose original course meandered across the plain in a nearly circular arc. In 1815 local residents successfully petitioned the state to bypass this large meander which locals described as "thirty-six miles of river and six miles of country". At this time five bridges crossed the Saco; the Hemlock Bridge was built in 1857. It is the last of the seven bridges still standing. It is maintained by the state.

== See also ==
- National Register of Historic Places listings in Oxford County, Maine
- List of bridges on the National Register of Historic Places in Maine
- List of Maine covered bridges
