= Watson Settlement Bridge =

- Formerly listed on the U.S. National Register of Historic Places
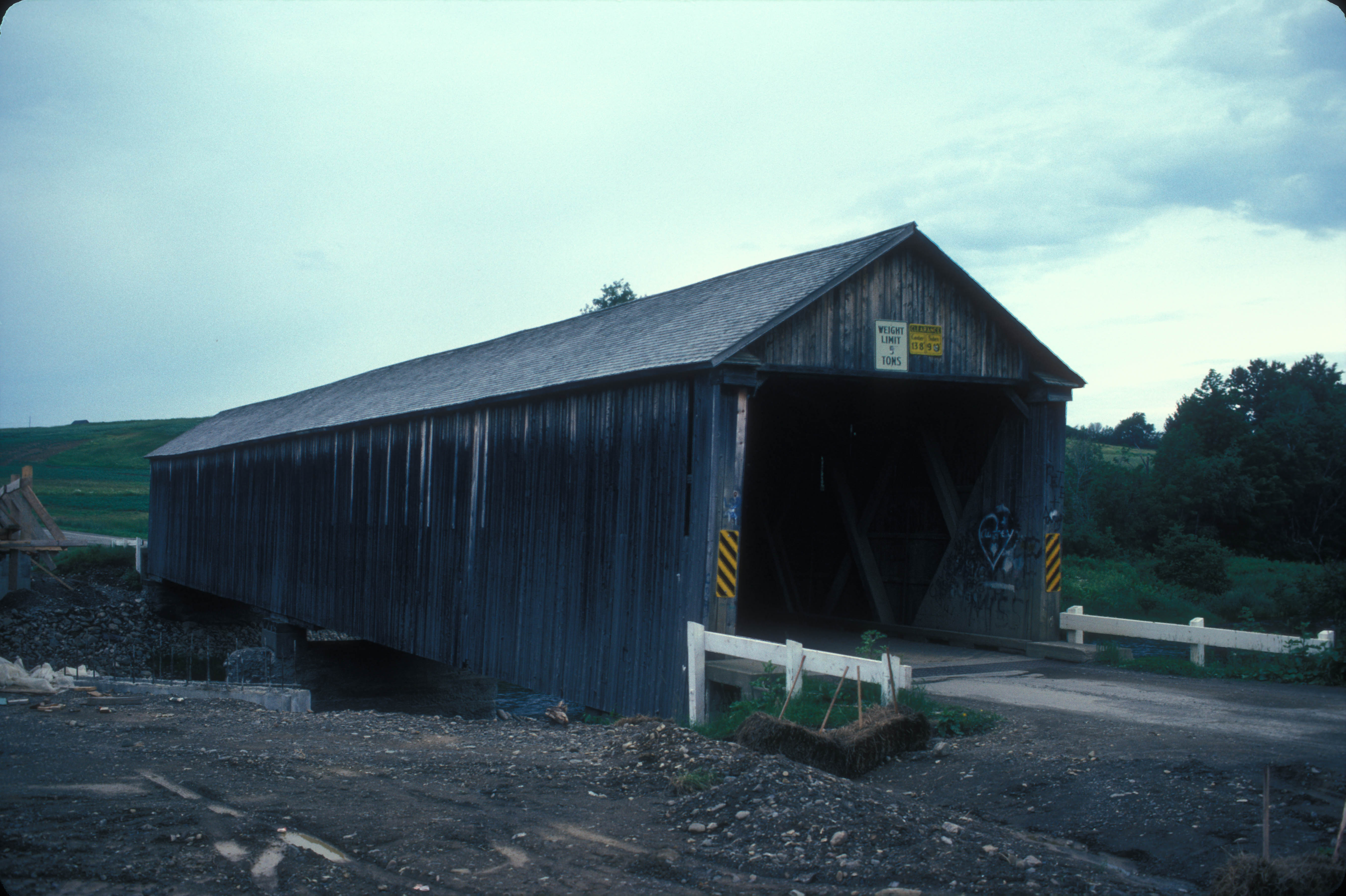

- Location within Maine Location within the United States
- Nearest city: Littleton, Maine
- Coordinates: 46°12′36″N 67°48′3″W
- Area: 0.3 acres (0.12 ha)
- Built: 1911
- Architectural style: Howe truss System
- NRHP reference No.: 70000039

Significant dates
- Added to NRHP: February 16, 1970
- Removed from NRHP: March 21, 2023

Watson Settlement Bridge was a historic covered bridge in eastern Littleton, Maine, United States. Built in 1911, it was one of the youngest of Maine's few surviving covered bridges. It formerly carried Framingham Road over the Meduxnekeag River, but was closed to traffic, the road passing over a modern bridge to its south. It was listed on the National Register of Historic Places in 1970. It was destroyed by fire on July 19, 2021, and subsequently delisted from the National Register in 2023.

== Description and history ==
The Watson Settlement Bridge was located in southeastern Littleton, a rural community in southern Aroostook County. The Meduxnekeag River flows north from Houlton into southeastern Littleton before turning east and crossing the international border into New Brunswick, Canada. Framingham Road, which the bridge formerly carried, crosses just south of the bridge on a modern structure. The covered bridge was about 150 feet (46 m) long, with two spans resting on stone abutments and a central pier. The bases of these structures are rubblestone that has been reinforced with concrete, with a 5-foot (1.5 m) top section that was contained within a timber cribwork. The structure was about 20 feet (6.1 m) wide and a similar height, with an internal clearance height of 13 feet 2 inches (4.01 m) and width of 18 feet (5.5 m). The support system for the two spans was Howe trusses. The exterior of the bridge was finished in vertical siding, and the roof was shingled.

The bridge appears to be the first built at this location, no bridges having been marked on earlier maps of the area. It was built in 1911, and was attended by legal action between the county and the town over the cost of building its approaches, which was ultimately borne by the town. The bridge was closed to vehicular traffic with the construction of the adjacent bridge in 1984.

The Watson Settlement Bridge was designated as a Maine Historic Civil Engineering Landmark by the American Society of Civil Engineers in 2002.

On July 19, 2021, the bridge was destroyed by fire. The cause of the fire was determined to be arson.

== See also ==
- National Register of Historic Places listings in Aroostook County, Maine
- List of bridges on the National Register of Historic Places in Maine
- List of Maine covered bridges
