= List of bridges documented by the Historic American Engineering Record in Maine =

This is a list of bridges documented by the Historic American Engineering Record in the U.S. state of Maine.

== Bridges ==
Survey No.	Name (as assigned by HAER)	Status	Type	Built	Documented	Carries	Crosses	Location	County	Coordinates
ME-3	New Portland Suspension Bridge	Extant	Suspension	1866	1984	Wire Bridge Road	Carrabassett River	New Portland	Somerset	44°53′27″N 70°05′33″W
ME-4	Lovejoy Bridge	Extant	Paddleford truss	1867	1984	Covered Bridge Road	Ellis River	Andover	Oxford	44°35′36″N 70°44′00″W
ME-5	Bailey Island Bridge	Extant	Causeway	1928	1984	SR 24	Casco Bay	Bailey Island and Orr's Island	Cumberland	43°44′58″N 69°59′19″W
ME-8	Smith Bridge	Replaced	Warren truss	1910	1993	Lowery Road	Meduxnekeag River	Houlton	Aroostook	46°10′52″N 67°48′15″W
ME-9	Presumpscot Falls Bridge	Replaced	Reinforced concrete open-spandrel arch	1913	1993	Allen Avenue Extension	Presumpscot River	Falmouth	Cumberland	43°43′01″N 70°15′53″W
ME-14	Sieur de Monts Spring Bridge	Extant	Reinforced concrete closed-spandrel arch	1940	1994	SR 3	Park Loop Road	Bar Harbor	Hancock	44°21′41″N 68°12′12″W
ME-15	Blackwoods Bridge	Extant	Reinforced concrete rigid frame	1940	1995	SR 3	Park Loop Road	Otter Creek	Hancock	44°18′32″N 68°13′19″W
ME-16	Fish House Bridge	Extant	Reinforced concrete closed-spandrel arch	1938	1994	Fish House Access Road	Park Loop Road	Otter Creek	Hancock	44°18′57″N 68°11′48″W
ME-17	Route 233 Bridge	Extant	Reinforced concrete closed-spandrel arch	1951	1994	Paradise Hill Road	SR 233 (Eagle Lake Road)	Bar Harbor	Hancock	44°22′51″N 68°13′55″W
ME-18	New Eagle Lake Road Bridge	Extant	Reinforced concrete closed-spandrel arch	1951	1994	Paradise Hill Road	New Eagle Lake Road	Bar Harbor	Hancock	44°23′29″N 68°13′47″W
ME-19	Otter Creek Cove Bridge & Causeway	Extant	Stone arch	1938	1995	Park Loop Road	Otter Creek Cove	Seal Harbor	Hancock	44°19′02″N 68°11′59″W
ME-20	Kebo Brook Bridge	Extant	Reinforced concrete closed-spandrel arch	1938	1995	Park Loop Road	Kebo Brook	Bar Harbor	Hancock	44°22′22″N 68°13′19″W
ME-21	Little Hunters Beach Brook Bridge	Extant	Reinforced concrete closed-spandrel arch	1938	1994	Park Loop Road	Little Hunters Beach Brook	Seal Harbor	Hancock	44°17′55″N 68°12′41″W
ME-22	Hunters Beach Brook Bridge	Extant	Culvert	1940	1995	Park Loop Road	Hunters Beach Brook	Seal Harbor	Hancock	44°18′34″N 68°13′20″W
ME-23	Frazer Creek Bridge	Extant	Reinforced concrete cast-in-place slab		1994	Schoodic Peninsula Road	Frazer Creek	Winter Harbor	Hancock	44°22′30″N 68°04′14″W
ME-30	Duck Brook Bridge	Extant	Reinforced concrete closed-spandrel arch	1953	1995	Paradise Hill Road	Duck Brook	Bar Harbor	Hancock	44°23′57″N 68°13′54″W
ME-31	Cobblestone Bridge	Extant	Reinforced concrete closed-spandrel arch	1917	1994	Gardiner–Mitchell Hill–Jordan Stream Carriage Road	Jordan Stream	Seal Harbor	Hancock	44°18′47″N 68°15′30″W
ME-32	Little Harbor Brook Bridge	Extant	Reinforced concrete closed-spandrel arch	1919	1994	Asticou–Jordan Pond Carriage Road	Little Harbor Brook	Northeast Harbor	Hancock	44°18′56″N 68°16′06″W
ME-33	Jordan Pond Dam Bridge	Extant	Reinforced concrete closed-spandrel arch	1920	1994	Jordan Pond Carriage Road	Jordan Stream	Seal Harbor	Hancock	44°19′19″N 68°15′17″W
ME-34	Hemlock Bridge	Extant	Reinforced concrete closed-spandrel arch	1924	1995	West Sargent Mountain Carriage Road	Maple Spring Brook	Northeast Harbor	Hancock	44°19′55″N 68°16′56″W
ME-35	Waterfall Bridge	Extant	Reinforced concrete closed-spandrel arch	1925	1994	West Sargent Mountain Carriage Road	Upper Hadlock Brook	Northeast Harbor	Hancock	44°19′53″N 68°16′50″W
ME-36	Deer Brook Bridge	Extant	Reinforced concrete closed-spandrel arch	1933	1994	Eagle Lake–Jordan Pond Carriage Road	Deer Brook	Seal Harbor	Hancock	44°20′25″N 68°15′45″W
ME-37	Hadlock Brook Bridge	Extant	Reinforced concrete closed-spandrel arch	1926	1994	Upper Hadlock Brook Carriage Road	Hadlock Brook	Northeast Harbor	Hancock	44°19′30″N 68°17′05″W
ME-38	Chasm Brook Bridge	Extant	Reinforced concrete closed-spandrel arch	1926	1995	West Sargent Mountain Carriage Road	Chasm Brook	Bar Harbor	Hancock	44°21′12″N 68°16′29″W
ME-39	Bubble Pond Bridge	Extant	Stone arch	1928	1994	Bubble Pond Carriage Road	Abandoned Road	Bar Harbor	Hancock	44°20′59″N 68°14′30″W
ME-40	Duck Brook Bridge	Extant	Reinforced concrete closed-spandrel arch	1929	1994	Witch Hole Pond Loop Carriage Road	Duck Brook	Bar Harbor	Hancock	44°23′30″N 68°14′09″W
ME-41	Amphitheater Bridge	Extant	Reinforced concrete closed-spandrel arch	1932	1995	Amphitheater Carriage Road	Little Harbor Brook	Seal Harbor	Hancock	44°19′27″N 68°16′11″W
ME-42	West Branch Jordan Stream Bridge	Extant	Reinforced concrete closed-spandrel arch	1931	1995	Amphitheater Carriage Road	West Branch Jordan Stream	Seal Harbor	Hancock	44°19′22″N 68°15′32″W
ME-43	Cliffside Bridge	Extant	Reinforced concrete closed-spandrel arch	1932	1995	Amphitheater Carriage Road	Jordan Ravine	Seal Harbor	Hancock	44°19′03″N 68°15′45″W
ME-44	Jordan Pond Road Bridge	Extant	Reinforced concrete closed-spandrel arch	1933	1995	Jordan Pond Road	Barr Hill–Day Mountain Carriage Road	Seal Harbor	Hancock	44°18′34″N 68°14′42″W
ME-45	Stanley Brook Bridge	Extant	Reinforced concrete closed-spandrel arch	1933	1994	Barr Hill–Day Mountain Carriage Road	Stanley Brook	Seal Harbor	Hancock	44°18′37″N 68°14′49″W
ME-46	Triad–Day Mountain Bridge	Extant	Reinforced concrete rigid frame	1941	1994	Triad–Day Mountain Pass	Park Loop Road	Seal Harbor	Hancock	44°18′57″N 68°14′03″W
ME-47	Wildwood Farm Bridge	Extant	Reinforced concrete rigid frame	1941	1995	Park Loop Road	Abandoned road	Seal Harbor	Hancock	44°18′43″N 68°14′33″W
ME-49	Eagle Lake Little Bridges	Extant	Steel rolled stringer	1930	1994	Eagle Lake Carriage Road	Duck Brook and Breakneck Brook	Bar Harbor	Hancock	44°22′35″N 68°14′43″W
ME-50	Aunt Betty's Pond Road Little Bridges	Extant	Steel rolled stringer	1930	1995	Aunt Betty's Pond Carriage Road	Unidentified stream (six times)	Bar Harbor	Hancock	44°21′16″N 68°16′06″W
ME-51	Meeting House Bridge	Replaced	Howe truss	1908	1994	Sinnott Road	Boston and Maine Railroad	Arundel	York	43°24′22″N 70°30′30″W
ME-52	Penobscot Bridge	Replaced	Baltimore truss	1902		SR 15	Penobscot River	Bangor and Brewer	Penobscot	44°47′56″N 68°45′51″W
ME-55	Eagle Lake Bridge	Extant	Reinforced concrete closed-spandrel arch	1928	1994	SR 233 (Eagle Lake Road)	Carriage Road	Bar Harbor	Hancock	44°22′40″N 68°15′12″W
ME-61	Pope Memorial Bridge	Replaced	Reinforced concrete closed-spandrel arch	1902	1996	US 1 / SR 191	East Machias River	East Machias	Washington	44°44′21″N 67°23′20″W
ME-62	Ducktrap Bridge	Replaced	Reinforced concrete T-beam	1920	1997	US 1	Ducktrap River	Lincolnville	Waldo	44°17′52″N 69°00′17″W
ME-65	Waldo–Hancock Bridge	Replaced	Suspension	1931	1994	US 1	Penobscot River	Bucksport	Hancock and Waldo	44°33′38″N 68°48′06″W
ME-66	Deer Isle–Sedgwick Bridge	Extant	Suspension	1939	1994	SR 15	Eggemoggin Reach	Deer Isle and Sedgwick	Hancock	44°17′38″N 68°41′20″W
ME-67	Free–Black Bridge	Extant	Baltimore truss	1909	1999	Maine Central Railroad	Androscoggin River	Brunswick and Topsham	Cumberland and Sagadahoc County	43°54′58″N 69°58′31″W
ME-69	Sunday River Bridge	Bypassed	Paddleford truss	1872	2003	Sunday River Road	Sunday River	Newry	Oxford	44°29′32″N 70°50′36″W
ME-70	Norridgewock Bridge	Replaced	Reinforced concrete through arch	1929	2006	US 201A / SR 8	Kennebec River	Norridgewock	Somerset	44°43′01″N 69°47′50″W
NH-52	Sarah Mildred Long Bridge	Replaced	Vertical-lift bridge	1940	2012	US 1 Byp. and Portsmouth Naval Shipyard railroad	Piscataqua River	Kittery, Maine, and Portsmouth, New Hampshire	York County, Maine, and Rockingham County, New Hampshire	43°05′09″N 70°45′39″W
