= Bennett Bridge =

- U.S. National Register of Historic Places
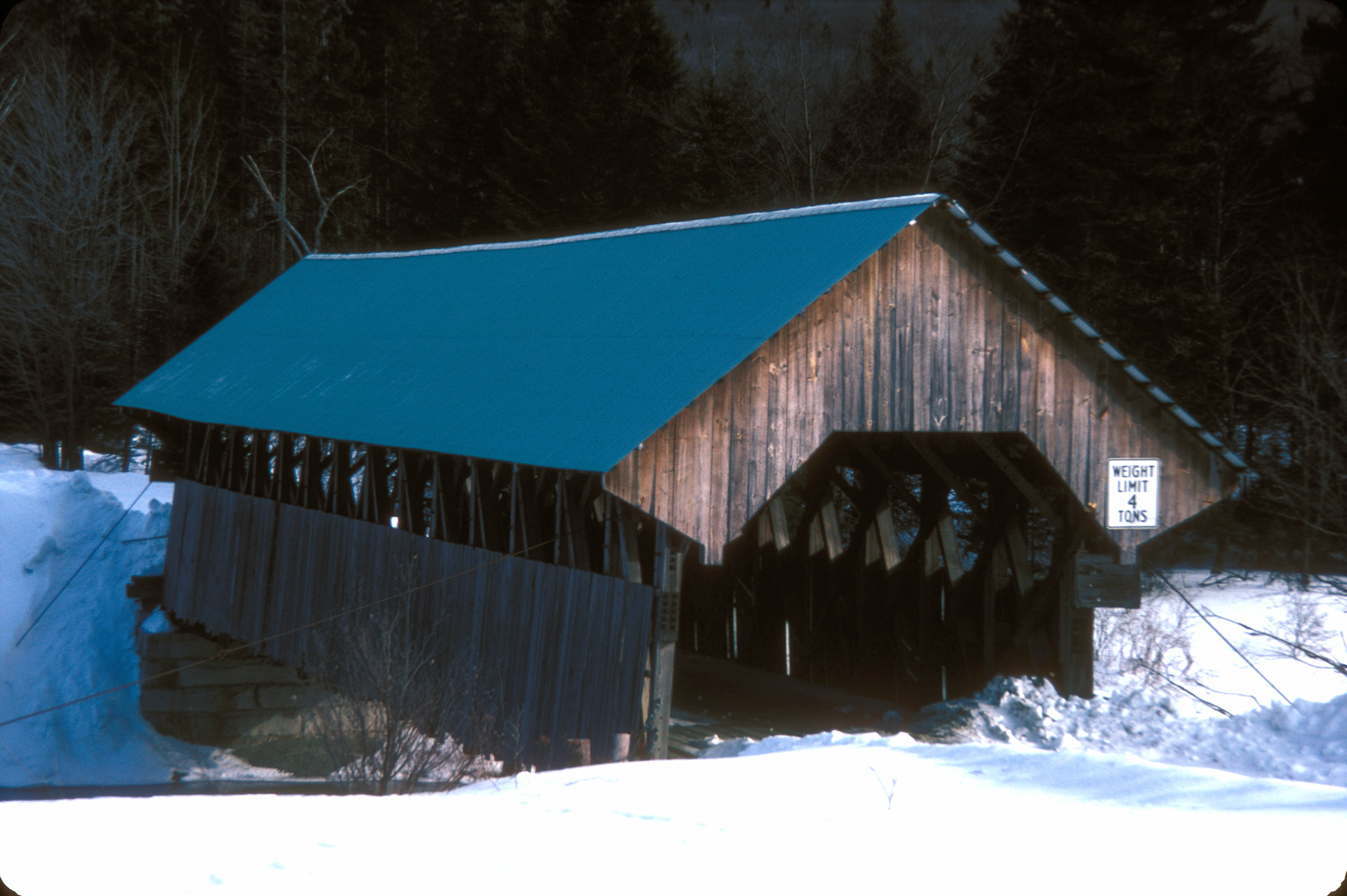

- Location within Maine Location within the United States
- Nearest city: Wilson Mills, Maine
- Coordinates: 44°55′4″N 71°2′21″W
- Area: less than one acre
- Built: 1901
- Architectural style: Paddleford truss
- NRHP reference No.: 70000055
- Added to NRHP: February 16, 1970

The Bennett Bridge is a historic covered bridge in rural northern Oxford County, Maine. The bridge, now closed to traffic, formerly carried Littlehale Road over the Magalloway River, about 1.5 miles (2.4 km) south of the village Wilsons Mills in Lincoln Plantation. Built in 1901, it is one of Maine's few older covered bridges. The bridge was listed on the National Register of Historic Places in 1970.

The sign on the bridge itself has a date of 1898. That date is also cited on the Lost Bridges site maintained by the National Society for the Preservation of Covered Bridges

== Description ==
The bridge is a Paddleford truss bridge, a type of truss in which diagonal cross members are connected to King posts, fastened by metal bolts. It is 92 feet (28 m) in length, resting on granite abutments. Its total width is 16'8", with an interior roadway width of 14'8". Its total height is 23 feet (7.0 m) (from roadbed to top of gable), with a portal clearance of 15 feet (4.6 m). Its sides are clad in vertical boarding roughly 2/3 of the way to the roof; the ends are also clad in vertical boarding above and around the portals. The bridge is further stabilized by wire cables at each corner, which are anchored to concrete settings about 25 feet (7.6 m) from the bridge.

Bennett Bridge was built in 1901, to provide access from a handful of small farms to Maine State Route 16, the major road through Lincoln Plantation. It spans the Magalloway River at a point where it is swiftly flowing, passing through a fairly narrow valley in the hilly region. The bridge saw heavy use from logging trucks that also worked in the area, and was closed to traffic in 1985.

== See also ==
- National Register of Historic Places listings in Oxford County, Maine
- List of bridges on the National Register of Historic Places in Maine
- List of Maine covered bridges
