= Lovejoy Bridge =

Coordinates: 44°35′36″N 70°44′00″W

- U.S. National Register of Historic Places
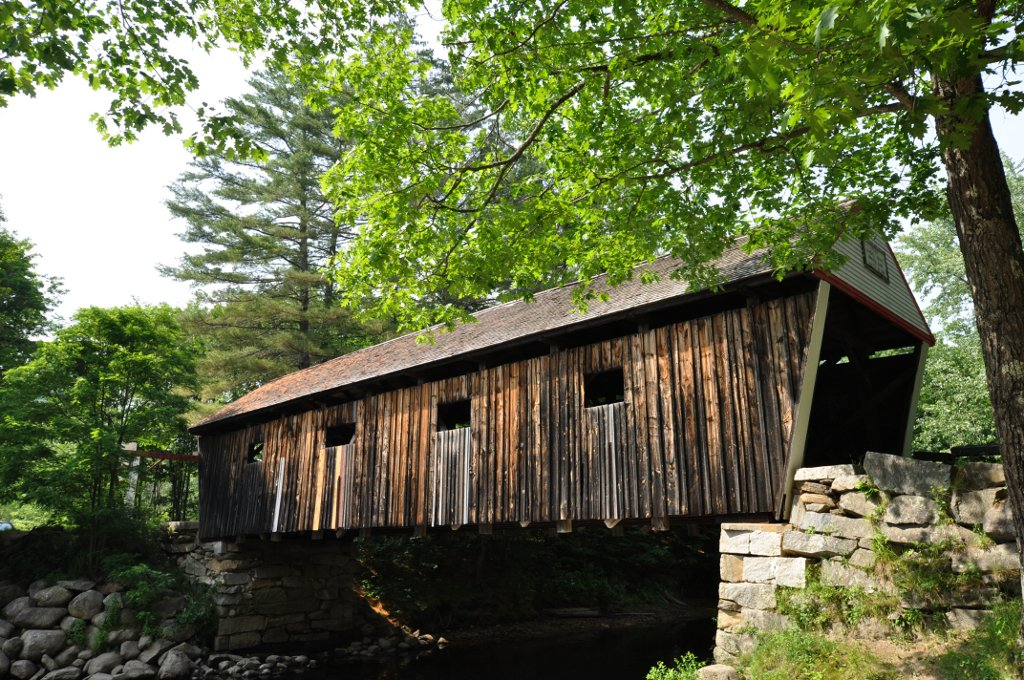

- Location within Maine Location within the United States
- Location: Over Ellis River, South Andover, Maine
- Area: 0.3 acres (0.12 ha)
- Built: 1868
- Architectural style: Paddleford truss
- NRHP reference No.: 70000057
- Added to NRHP: February 16, 1970

The Lovejoy Bridge is a historic covered bridge in South Andover, Maine. It is a Paddleford truss bridge, which carries Covered Bridge Road over the Ellis River, about 9 miles (14 km) north of US Route 2. Built in 1868, it is one of a small number of 19th-century covered bridges remaining in the state, and it is the state's shortest covered bridge. It was listed on the National Register of Historic Places in 1970.

== Description ==
The Ellis River cuts a meandering course through the town of Andover, joining the Androscoggin River at Rumford Point. There has probably been a bridge at this site in southern Andover since the early 19th century, as the river course narrows sufficiently, and provides a crossing point for people traveling between Rumford Point and the main village of Andover, which is located further north. This bridge was built in 1868, but it is known that a small village already existed nearby, suggesting the existence of a previous bridge.

The bridge is 70 feet (21 m) long and 20 feet (6.1 m) wide, with a roadway width of 17 feet (5.2 m) and an internal clearance of 14 feet (4.3 m). It rests on abutments built out of large granite blocks. The bridge has a gabled roof, giving it a total height of 22 feet (6.7 m). Its sides are sheathed in vertical boards, and the gable ends have been trimmed. The bridge was reinforced in 1984 to support local traffic.

== See also ==
- National Register of Historic Places listings in Oxford County, Maine
- List of bridges documented by the Historic American Engineering Record in Maine
- List of bridges on the National Register of Historic Places in Maine
- List of Maine covered bridges
