= Paddleford =

Paddleford is a surname. Notable people with the surname include:

- Clementine Paddleford (1898–1967), American food writer
- Peter Paddleford (1785–1859), American covered bridge builder
