= Swiftwater Covered Bridge =

- U.S. National Register of Historic Places
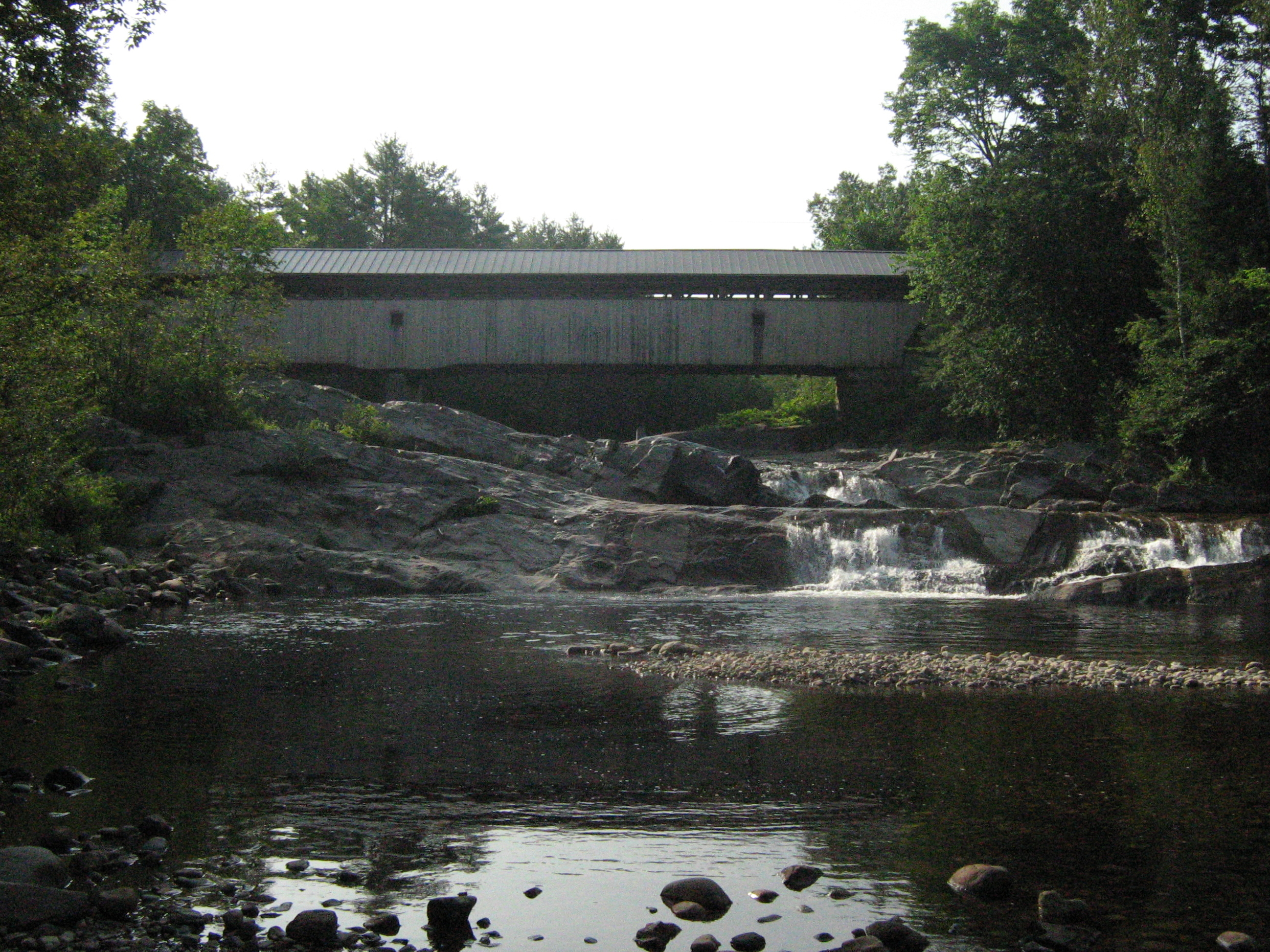

- Location within New Hampshire Location within the United States
- Location: Porter Rd., Bath, New Hampshire
- Coordinates: 44°8′3″N 71°57′5″W
- Area: 0.1 acres (0.040 ha)
- Built: 1849
- Architectural style: Paddleford truss
- NRHP reference No.: 76000127
- Added to NRHP: November 21, 1976

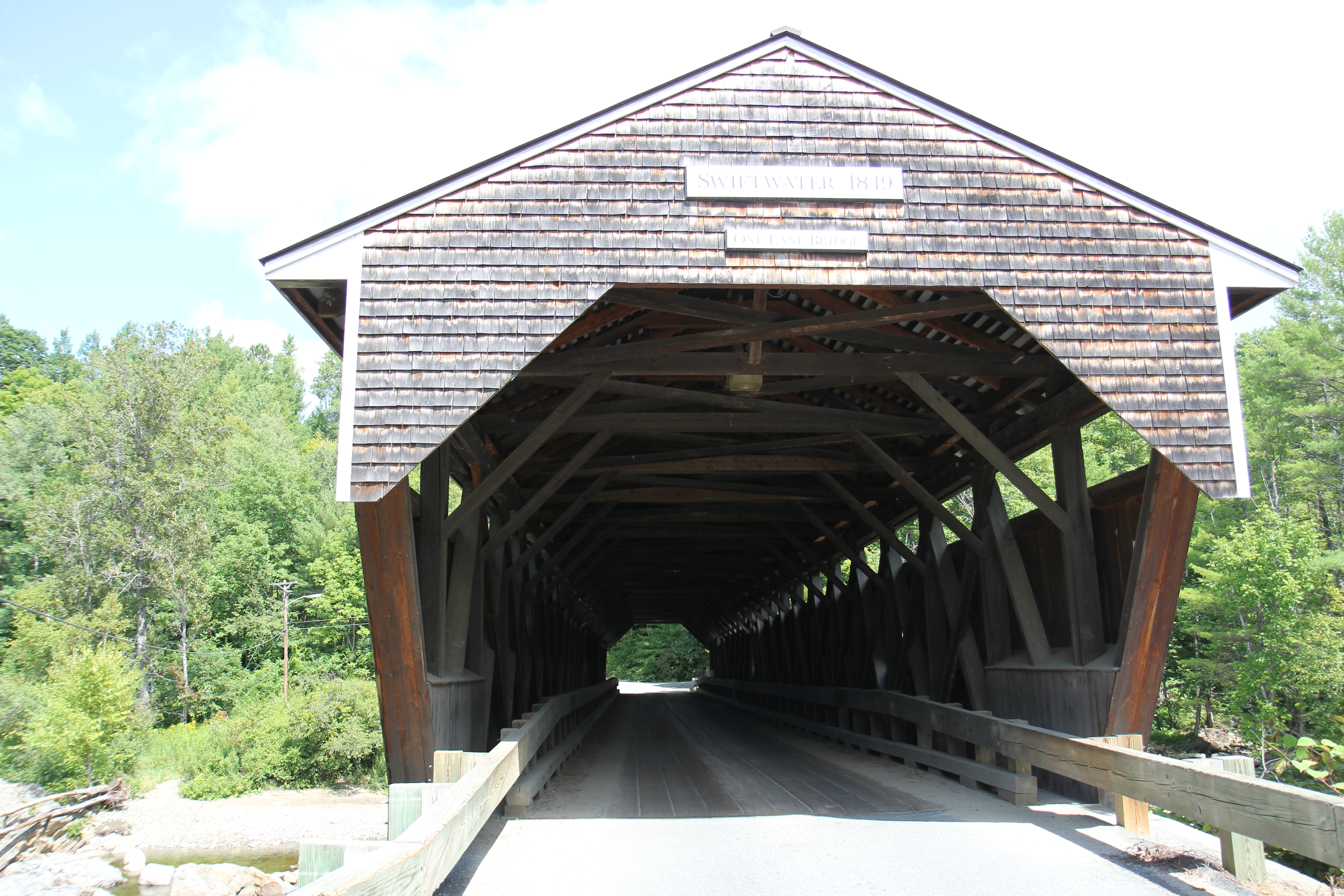
Profile

The Swiftwater Covered Bridge is a historic covered bridge which carries Porter Road over the Wild Ammonoosuc River in Bath, New Hampshire. Built in 1849, it is one of New Hampshire's few surviving 19th-century covered bridges, and a well-preserved example of the Paddleford truss design. The bridge was added to the National Register of Historic Places in 1976.

== Description and history ==
The Swiftwater Covered Bridge is located in southeastern Bath, carrying Porter Road over the Wild Ammonoosuc River just north of New Hampshire Route 112. It is a locally distinctive single-span Paddleford truss design, with laminated arches and steel beam reinforcements added in the 20th century. The bridge has an overall length of 173'8" and two clear spans of 77'6" and 57'6". The roadbed is 14'6" wide, with a vertical clearance of 12'9". It rests on lightly-mortared split granite abutments topped with concrete footings. The roof is made of corrugated metal, and the sides are sheathed in vertical planking to a height of eight feet, leaving an exposed area above. Its portals are also covered in vertical planking, but do not extend all the way to the ground.

The bridge, the fourth on the site, was built in 1849; the first two bridges, dating back to 1810, were washed away by floods. It was probably built under the auspices of Joseph Fifield and John Carbee, town officials responsible for its highways and bridges. Its design, an unpatented truss by New Hampshire native Peter Paddleford, may have been used due to local connections with Paddleford associates. The bridge is said to have survived the use of explosives to clear logjams in the area.

== See also ==
- List of New Hampshire covered bridges
- List of bridges on the National Register of Historic Places in New Hampshire
- National Register of Historic Places listings in Grafton County, New Hampshire
