= List of bridges on the National Register of Historic Places in Maine =

This is a list of bridges and tunnels on the National Register of Historic Places in the U.S. state of Maine.

Name	Image	Built	Listed	Location	County	Type
Androscoggin Swinging Bridge	Androscoggin Swinging Bridge	1892, by 1913, 1936	January 14, 2004	Brunswick; 43°55′6″N 69°58′26″W	Cumberland	Suspension bridge
Arch Bridge	Arch Bridge	c. 1857	July 7, 2003	Bristol; 43°57′44″N 69°30′35″W	Lincoln	Stone arch bridge
Babb's Bridge		1976 replica of 1864 bridge	September 7, 1972	Windham; 43°45′58″N 70°26′53″W	Cumberland	1864 bridge destroyed by arson in 1973.
Bailey Island Cobwork Bridge		1928	April 28, 1975	Harpswell; 43°44′55″N 69°59′22″W	Cumberland	The only surviving cribstone bridge in the world
Bennett Bridge	Bennett Bridge	1901	February 16, 1970	Wilson Mills; 44°55′4″N 71°2′21″W	Oxford	Paddleford truss
Carriage Paths, Bridges and Gatehouses		1919, 1931	November 14, 1979	Acadia National Park	Hancock	Gothic arched bridges
Churchill Bridge	Churchill Bridge	1797	March 17, 1994	Buckfield; 44°14′44″N 70°23′10″W	Oxford	Stone lintel bridge
Grist Mill Bridge	Grist Mill Bridge	c. 1885	December 27, 1990	Lebanon; 43°23′30″N 70°51′6″W	York	A non-trussed, timber bridge on stone abutments improved in 1950 and restored in 1993.
Hemlock Bridge	Hemlock Bridge	1857	February 16, 1970	Fryeburg Center; 44°4′46″N 70°54′13″W	Oxford	Paddleford truss
Lovejoy Bridge	Lovejoy Bridge	1868	February 16, 1970	South Andover; 44°35′37″N 70°44′2″W	Oxford	Paddleford truss
New Portland Wire Bridge	New Portland Wire Bridge	1866	January 12, 1970	New Portland; 44°53′27″N 70°5′37″W	Somerset	Possibly the only surviving wire (suspension) bridge in the United States. It has covered, timber framed towers.
Porter-Parsonfield Bridge	Porter-Parsonfield Bridge	1876	February 16, 1970	Porter; 43°47′30″N 70°56′18″W	Oxford, York	Paddleford Truss
Robyville Bridge	Robyville Bridge	1876	February 16, 1970	Corinth; 44°56′35″N 68°58′8″W	Penobscot	Howe truss System
Ryefield Bridge		1912	September 24, 1999	Stuarts Corner; 44°8′34″N 70°35′43″W	Cumberland and Oxford	Warren through truss
Sunday River Bridge	Sunday River Bridge	1872	February 16, 1970	Newry; 44°29′31″N 70°50′36″W	Oxford	Paddleford truss
Thompson's Bridge		c. 1808	March 22, 1991	Allen's Mills; 44°43′36″N 70°0′25″W	Franklin	Stone lintel
Two Cent Bridge		1903	September 20, 1973	Waterville-Winslow; 44°33′3″N 69°37′45″W	Kennebec	Suspension type
Watson Settlement Bridge	Watson Settlement Bridge	1911	February 16, 1970	Littleton; 46°12′36″N 67°48′3″W	Aroostook	Howe truss system

== Bridges removed from the register ==
Name	Image	Built	Listed	Delisted	Location	County	Type	Notes
Lowe's Bridge		1857		May 12, 1987	Sangerville	Piscataquis	Long truss system	Lost in flood
Morse Bridge		1882	February 16, 1970	September 29, 2015	Bangor; 44°48′28″N 68°46′43″W	Penobscot	Covered bridge	Burned down in the 1980s
New Sharon Bridge	New Sharon Bridge	1916	September 24, 1999	July 14, 2015	New Sharon; 44°38′16″N 70°0′56″W	Franklin	Pennsylvania thru truss	Torn down in 2014
Smith Bridge	Smith Bridge	1910	April 2, 1993	December 8, 2013	Houlton; 46°10′52″N 67°48′16″W	Aroostook	2-Span Warren pony truss	
Waldo-Hancock Bridge	Waldo-Hancock Bridge	1931	June 20, 1985	December 8, 2013	Prospect, Verona; 44°33′37″N 68°48′8″W	Hancock, Waldo	Suspension bridge	Demolished in 2013
