= Ryefield Bridge =

Bridge in Harrison and Otisfield, Maine

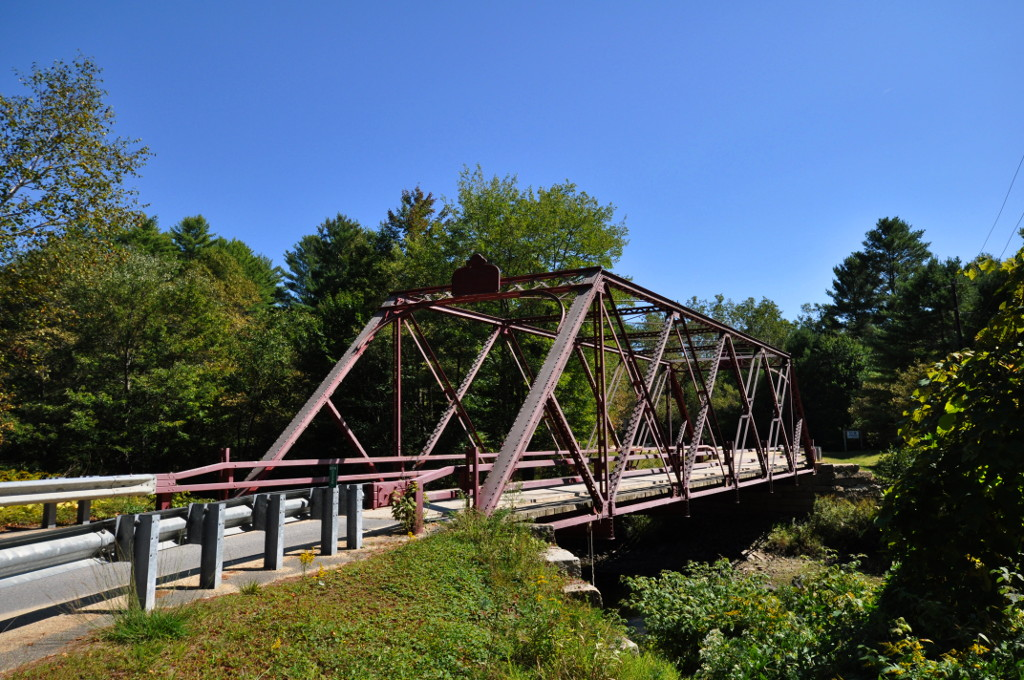
- Coordinates: 44°8′34″N 70°35′43″W
- Carries: Ryefield Bridge Road
- Crosses: Crooked River
- Locale: Stuarts Corner, Maine
- Owner: State Highway Agency
- Maintained by: State Highway Agency
- ID number: 0238

Characteristics
- Design: Steel Truss - Thru
- Total length: 31.4 metres (103 ft)
- Width: 5 metres (16 ft)
- Longest span: 29.3 metres (96 ft)
- Clearance above: 4.04 metres (13.3 ft)

History
- Opened: 1912
- Rebuilt: 2002

Statistics
- Daily traffic: 240
- Ryefield Bridge
- U.S. National Register of Historic Places
- Location within Maine Location within the United States
- Nearest city: Stuarts Corner, Maine
- Area: less than one acre
- Built: 1912
- Built by: American Bridge Co.
- Architectural style: Warren through truss
- NRHP reference No.: 99001193
- Added to NRHP: September 24, 1999

Location
- Interactive map of Ryefield Bridge

The Ryefield Bridge is a historic bridge connecting Ryefield Bridge Road in Harrison, Maine, to West Andrew Hill Road in Otisfield, Maine, across the Crooked River. Built in 1912, it is one of the oldest surviving Warren truss bridges in the state, and is a rare example with double-intersection diagonals, added for increased rigidity. The bridge was listed on the National Register of Historic Places in 1999.

== Description and history ==
The bridge is set in a rural area of western Maine, set across the Crooked River, which forms the border between the towns of Harrison to the west and Otisfield to the east, in an area known locally as Stuart's Corner. The bridge is a single span, 98 feet (30 m) in length, resting on ashlar granite abutments. Steel beams and stringers carry a road deck 16.5 feet (5.0 m) wide, covered with planking. It has two Warren through trusses, whose elements are riveted in place, with a second set of diagonal members (the "double intersection" members) that add rigidity to the structure. The portals are adorned with decorative plaques identifying the date and manufacturer of the structure.

The bridge was manufactured by the American Bridge Company and installed in 1912 by its construction arm, the United Construction Company of Albany, New York. It is one of a handful of known pre-1916 Warren truss bridges in the state, and a particularly rare example of a lighter-weight instance with double-intersection diagonals. The cost of construction was paid by the towns of Harrison and Otisfield.

== See also ==
- National Register of Historic Places listings in Oxford County, Maine
- National Register of Historic Places listings in Cumberland County, Maine
- List of bridges on the National Register of Historic Places in Maine
