= Babb's Bridge =

- Formerly listed on the U.S. National Register of Historic Places
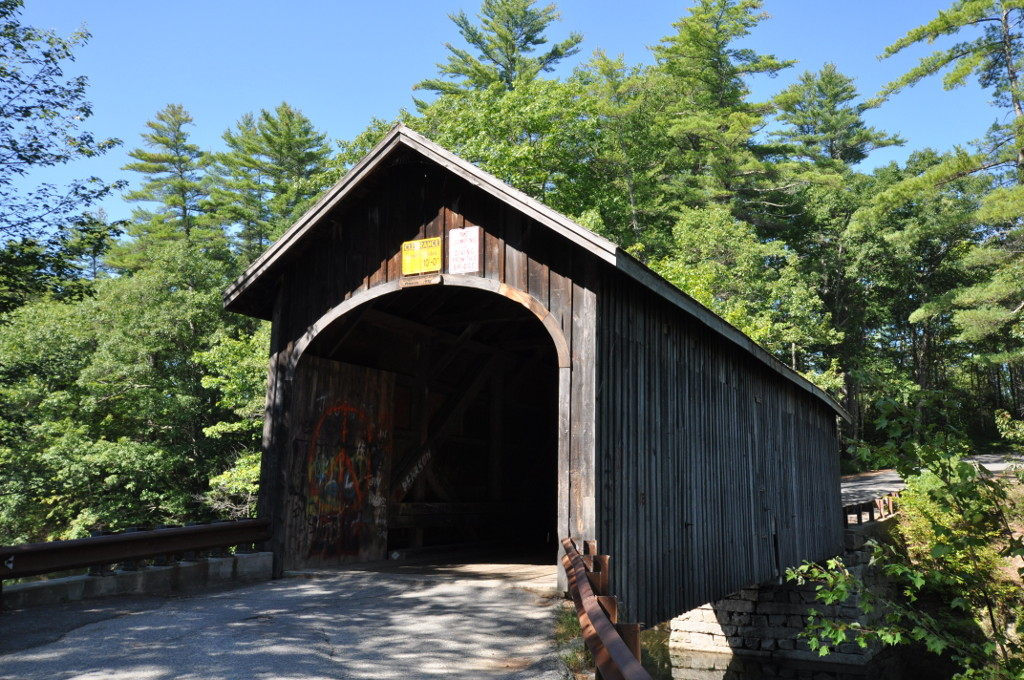
- Babb's Bridge in September 2014

- Location within Maine Location within the United States
- Nearest city: Gorham, Maine/Windham, Maine
- Coordinates: 43°45′58″N 70°26′53″W
- Area: less than one acre
- Built: 1976
- NRHP reference No.: 09000088

Significant dates
- Added to NRHP: September 7, 1972
- Removed from NRHP: March 21, 2023

Babb's Bridge is a covered bridge spanning the Presumpscot River on Hurricane Road, between the towns of Gorham and Windham in Cumberland County, Maine. Built in 1976, it is a replica of a 19th-century bridge that stood on the site until it was destroyed by arson in 1973. The bridge was listed on the National Register of Historic Places in 1972, and was delisted in 2023.

== Description and history ==
Babb's Bridge is located on the Presumpscot River, carrying Hurricane Road between central-western Windham on the east side and northern Gorham on the west side. It is a single-span queenspost truss bridge, with a total structure length of 79 feet (24 m) and a width of 13 feet 9 inches (4.19 m). Its end portals have a posted height limit of 10 feet (3.0 m). It is covered by a gabled roof, and its side and end walls are finished in vertical board siding.

The present bridge is a reconstruction, dedicated in 1976, of an earlier bridge, which was destroyed by arson in 1973. The exact date of construction of the older bridge is a matter of debate. Some sources give a date as early as 1843, while the state and other sources maintain a date of 1864. The 19th-century bridge was listed on the National Register of Historic Places in 1972 as a joint effort of the Windham and Gorham Historical Societies. Following its destruction, the towns petitioned the state to build a replica, instead of replacing the bridge with a modern structure of steel and concrete. The present bridge was built, in part as a community effort with donated materials and labor, using techniques that might have been used in the construction of the original.

In 2014, vandals cut holes in its roof to allow people to jump into the river below.

On August 23, 2024, a dump truck transporting crushed gravel and exceeding the 3-ton weight limit fell through the bridge deck, causing significant damage and closing the bridge for safety assessments and repairs. The driver suffered minor injuries and was issued a citation by Maine State Police the next day for a "bridge violation, causing damage to the bridge due to excessive weight". At the time, repairs were estimated to take months in the "best-case scenario". On February 20, 2025, repairs were completed and the bridge was re-opened.

== See also ==
- National Register of Historic Places listings in Cumberland County, Maine
- List of bridges on the National Register of Historic Places in Maine
- List of Maine covered bridges
