= New Portland Wire Bridge =

- U.S. National Register of Historic Places
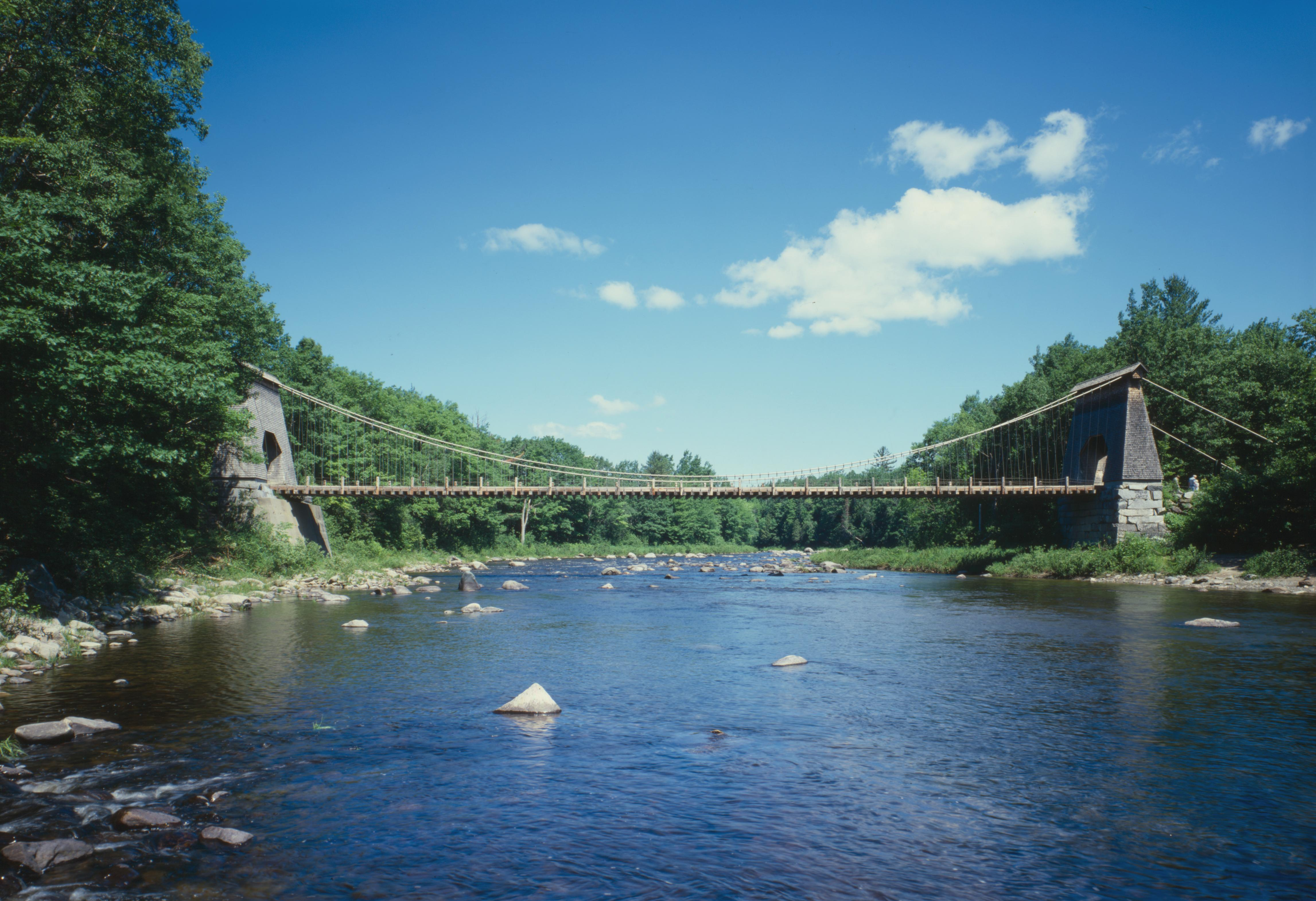

- Location within Maine Location within the United States
- Nearest city: New Portland, Maine
- Coordinates: 44°53′27″N 70°5′33″W
- Area: 0.3 acres (0.12 ha)
- Built by: Morse, Col. F. B.
- Architectural style: Wire (suspension) Bridge
- NRHP reference No.: 70000065
- Added to NRHP: January 12, 1970

The New Portland Wire Bridge is a historic suspension bridge in New Portland, Maine, United States. The bridge carries Wire Bridge Road across the Carrabassett River a short way north of the village center. Built in the mid-19th century, it is one of four 19th-century suspension bridges in the state. It is one lane wide, and has a weight limit of 3 short tons (2.7 t). The bridge was listed on the National Register of Historic Places in 1970 and was designated as a Maine Historic Civil Engineering Landmark by the American Society of Civil Engineers in 1990.

== Description and history ==
The bridge is in a rural setting, crossing the river just upstream of the mouth of Lemon Stream. The bridge is 188 feet (57 m) long and 12 feet (3.7 m) wide, sufficient to carry a single lane of traffic. The bridge towers are 25 feet (7.6 m), and are set on abutments of large rough-quarried granite. The towers are covered in wooden shingles, and are constructed of 12 inches (30 cm) beams. The main steel cables are about 4 inches (10 cm) in diameter, and connected to the bridge decking by 204 steel girders. The cable ends are anchored by concrete and granite blocks with an estimated weight of 30 short tons (27 t). The decking surface is wooden planks.

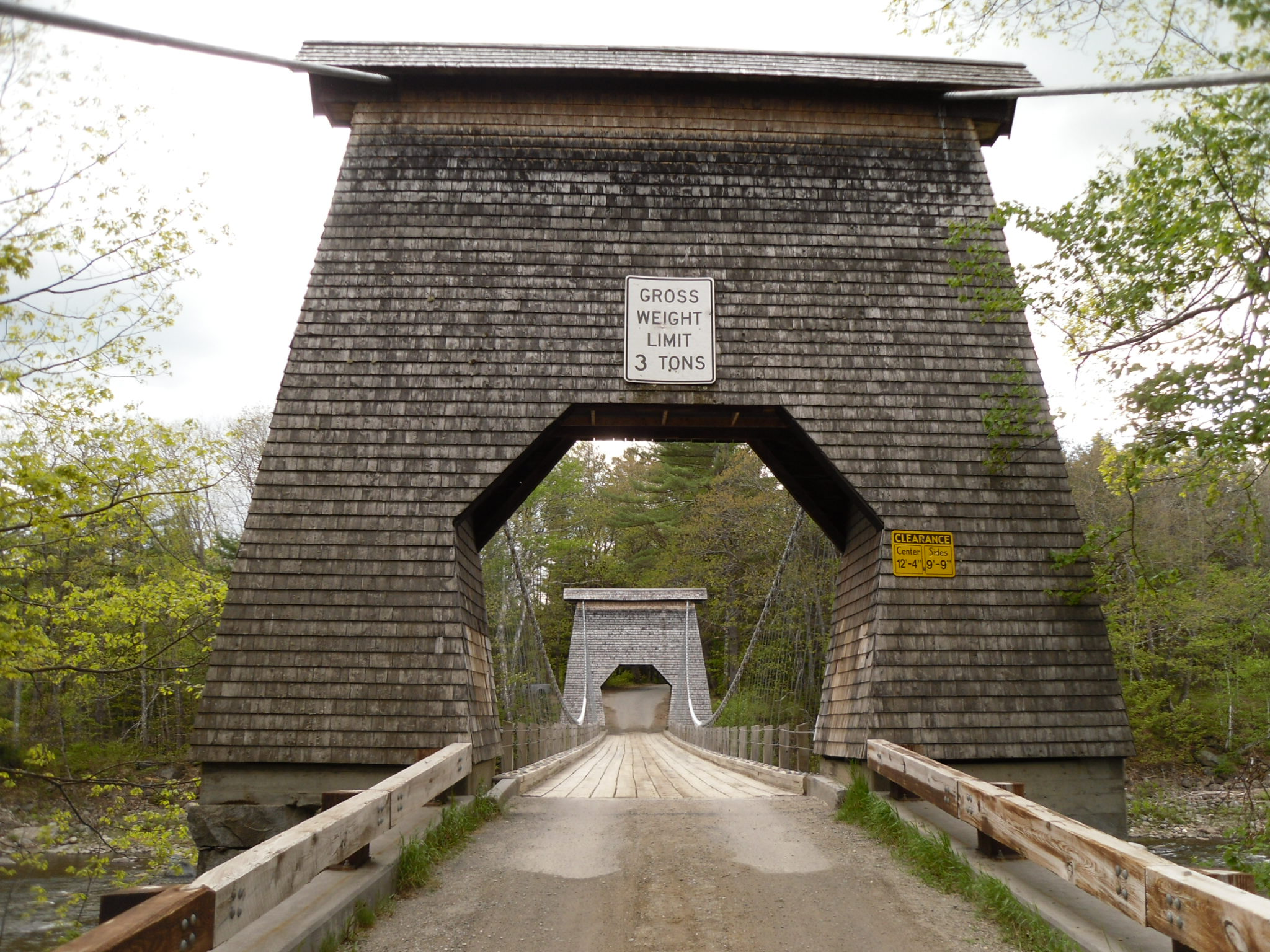
Entrance view

The construction history of the bridge is a matter of minor local controversy. One traditional account places its construction at 1840-42, under the auspices of Colonel F. B. Morse, who lived nearby and had been an engineer in the army. According to this account, Morse ordered the cables from Sheffield, England, and had them hauled overland from Hallowell by a large team of oxen. Local criticism of the work led the bridge to dubbed "Morse's Fool Bridge". The official town history of the bridge is more prosaic, stating that it was built in 1864–66 by David Eider and Captain Charles Clark. The bridge was last rehabilitated in 2009–10; its towers and cable are original.

== See also ==
- List of bridges documented by the Historic American Engineering Record in Maine
- List of bridges on the National Register of Historic Places in Maine
- National Register of Historic Places listings in Somerset County, Maine
