= Stephen Harriman Long =

American civil engineer and explorer (1784–1864)

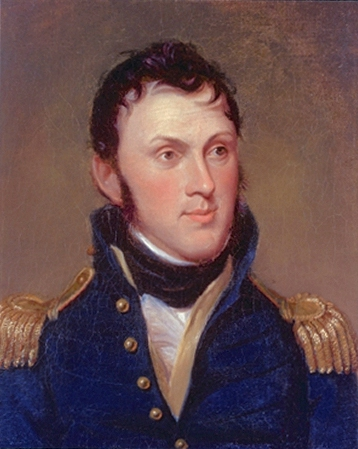
- Representation of the 1819 oil painting of Major Long. Portrait painted by Charles Willson Peale
- Born: December 30, 1784; Hopkinton, New Hampshire, U.S.
- Died: September 4, 1864 (aged 79); Alton, Illinois, U.S.
- Education: Dartmouth College
- Spouse: Martha Hodgkins
- Parent(s): Moses and Lucy (Harriman) Long
- Engineering career
- Discipline: Civil engineer; topographical engineer; explorer; inventor
- Institutions: U.S. Army Corps of Engineers (1814–1838); United States Army Corps of Topographical Engineers (1838–1863)
- Employers: Baltimore and Ohio Railroad; Western & Atlantic Railroad
- Projects: Federal expeditions in the trans-Mississippi West (1817–1823); federal internal-improvements surveys (1824–early 1830s); early railroad route studies and engineering
- Significant design: Long truss
- Significant advance: Early application of analytical methods in timber bridge design

Stephen Harriman Long (December 30, 1784 – September 4, 1864) was a United States Army officer, topographical engineer, civil engineer, and inventor whose career spanned military engineering, scientific exploration, federally sponsored internal improvements, and the early development of American railroads and bridge engineering.

He is best known for leading federal exploratory expeditions in the trans-Mississippi West between 1817 and 1823, including the 1820 reconnaissance of the Great Plains that contributed to the contemporary characterization of portions of the region as the “Great Desert.”

From the mid-1820s onward, Long played a significant role in federally authorized surveys under the General Survey Act and in early railroad development, including work associated with the Baltimore and Ohio Railroad and the Western & Atlantic Railroad. His railroad work formed part of a broader pattern in which Army engineers applied military engineering and administrative practices to early transportation systems.

In 1830, he patented the Long truss, a timber bridge system subsequently refined through additional patents in 1836 and 1839; the resulting sequence of designs combined adjustable compression bracing with early analytical proportioning of members and is treated by historians as an early American application of analytical methods in structural engineering.

Long also pursued early locomotive design during the 1830s, obtaining patents and collaborating with the Norris locomotive enterprise in Philadelphia; although his designs were not widely adopted, they contributed to early American experimentation in steam railroad technology.

== Early life and education ==
Long was born in Hopkinton, New Hampshire, the son of Moses and Lucy (Harriman) Long. He attended Dartmouth College and graduated in 1809.

After graduation, he worked as a schoolteacher in New Hampshire and later in Germantown, Pennsylvania. During this period, he developed practical mechanical skills and constructed “successful hydraulic machinery,” which brought him to the attention of Joseph Gardner Swift, then Chief Engineer of the United States Army and superintendent of the United States Military Academy.

Swift regarded Long as possessing notable mechanical ingenuity and first employed him as a civilian engineer on a project to improve the defenses of New York Harbor. In 1814, Long accepted a commission as a second lieutenant in the Corps of Engineers of the United States Army.

Long’s first Army assignment was as an assistant professor of mathematics at the United States Military Academy at West Point, New York (1815–1816). This appointment placed him within the early American institutional setting in which engineering practice, mathematical instruction, and military service were closely integrated.

== United States Army career (1814–1863) ==
Long was a commissioned officer of the United States Army from 1814 until his retirement in 1863. He served in the Corps of Engineers and, after the 1838 reorganization that created the Corps of Topographical Engineers, in that separate corps until its merger back into the Corps of Engineers in 1863. Much of Long’s work on internal improvements and early railroad surveys was performed on detached duty or through federally authorized engineering boards. During the American Civil War, he remained in Federal service and held the rank of colonel at the time of his retirement.

=== Early engineering assignments (1814–1817) ===
From 1815 to 1816, Long served as assistant professor of mathematics at the United States Military Academy at West Point, New York. This appointment reinforced his grounding in applied mathematics and mechanics at a time when formal engineering education in the United States remained closely tied to military instruction.

Following the Army's postwar reorganization in 1816, Long was assigned to topographical duties. His early assignments included work connected with the improvement of harbor defenses in New York Harbor, where he gained practical experience in masonry fortification, site preparation, and large-scale construction logistics.

Long was subsequently ordered to report to St. Louis in the Army’s western department, where he began organizing instruments, personnel, and survey procedures for reconnaissance work in the Mississippi Valley. These assignments marked the beginning of his sustained work in topographical surveying and route examination, skills that would shape his later exploratory and internal-improvement work.

=== Western explorations and scientific reconnaissance (1817–1823) ===
Between 1817 and 1823, Long directed a series of federally authorized reconnaissance expeditions in the trans-Mississippi West that combined military route examination with systematic scientific observation. These expeditions formed part of a broader program of U.S. government-sponsored exploration following the Louisiana Purchase, in which geographic reconnaissance, scientific study, and military objectives were closely linked.

In 1817, Long led an expedition up the Mississippi River to the Falls of St. Anthony, where he recommended the establishment of a permanent military post; the Army subsequently constructed Fort Snelling to secure the Upper Mississippi region. He later published an account of this journey as Voyage in a Six-Oared Skiff to the Falls of Saint Anthony in 1817 (1860).

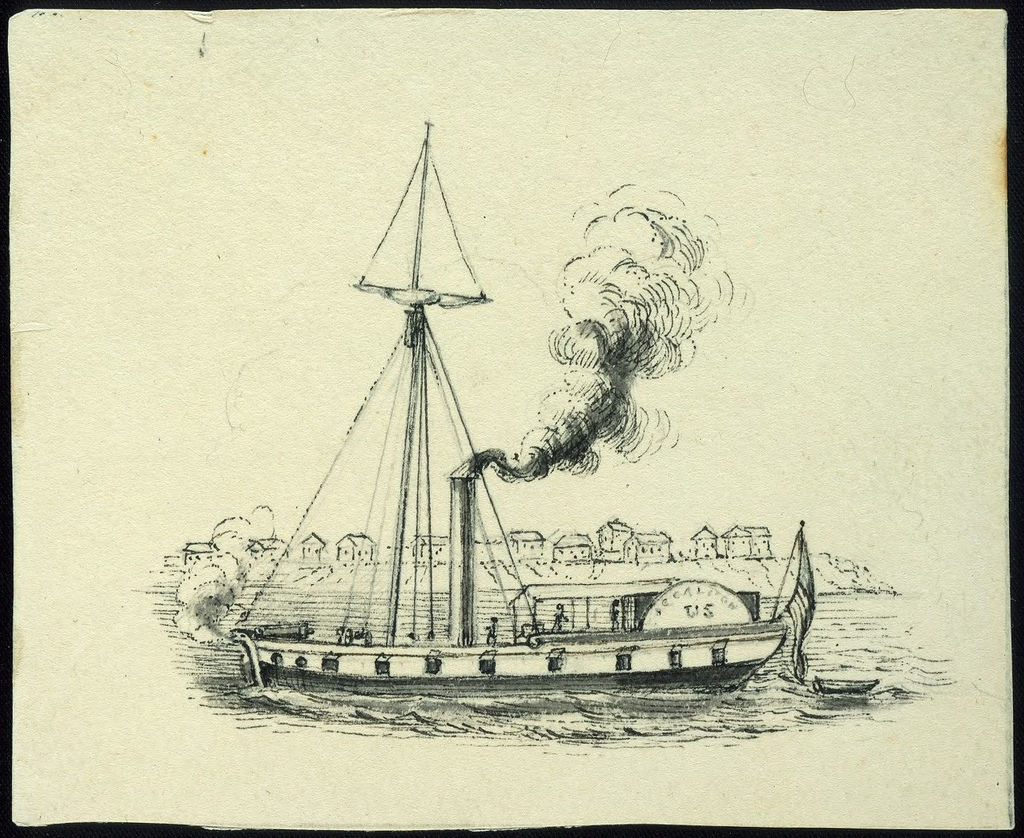
Steamboat Western Engineer by Titian Ramsay Peale, 1819

In 1818–1819, Long organized and led the scientific component of the Yellowstone Expedition on the Missouri River. For this expedition he designed the steamboat Western Engineer, an early purpose-built shallow-draft vessel for inland navigation that incorporated mechanical refinements intended to improve maneuverability on western rivers.

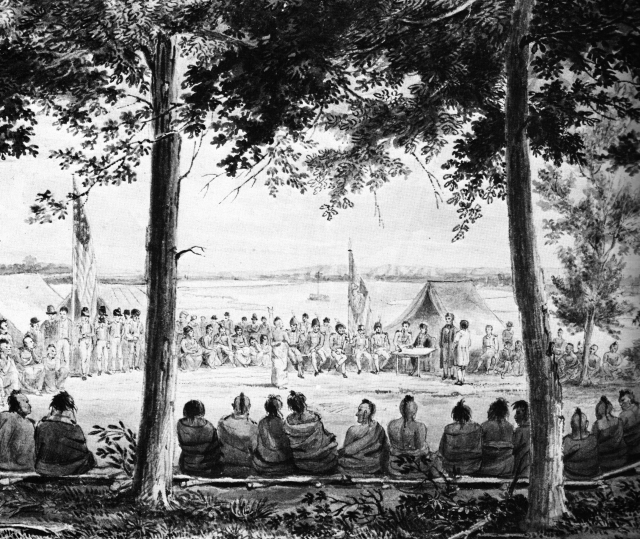
Pawnees in a parley with Major Long's expedition at Engineer Cantonment, near Council Bluffs, Iowa, October 1819

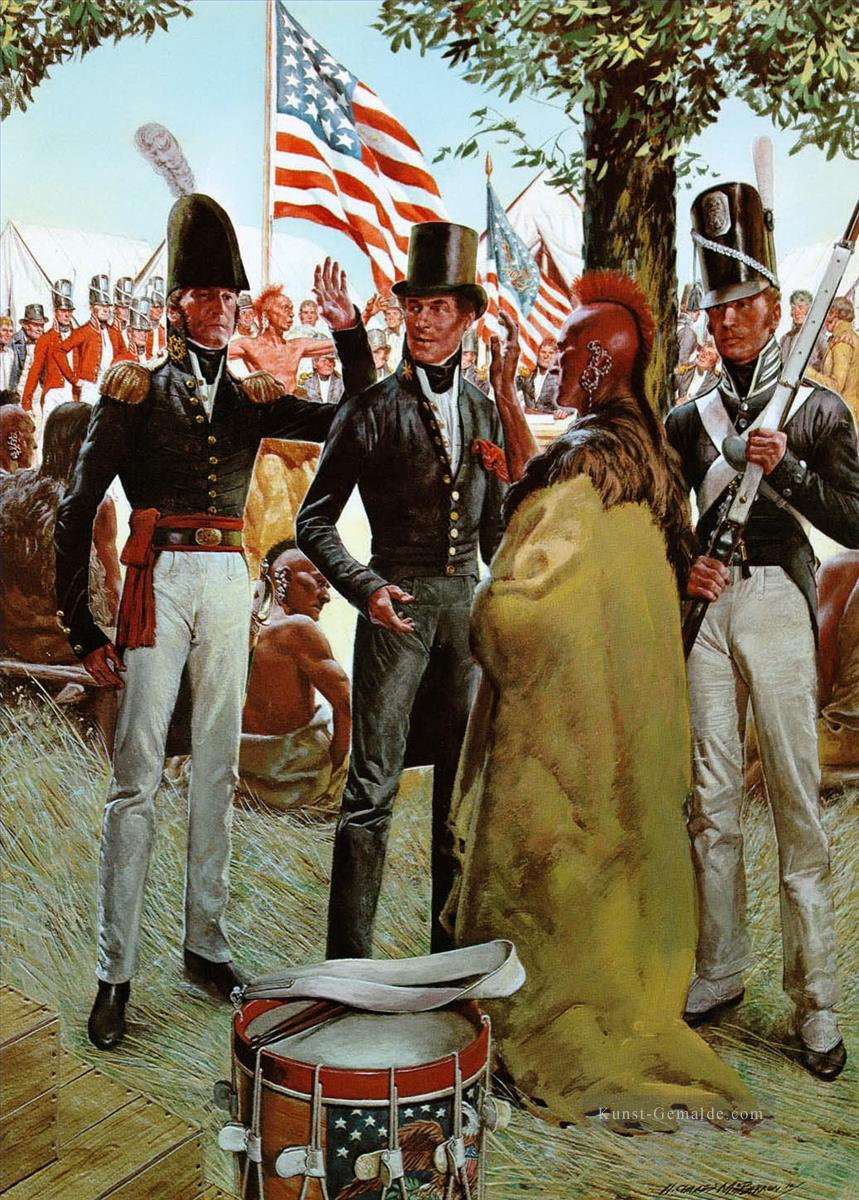
Major Long meets with the Pawnees at Council Bluffs, Iowa (1819)

The 1820 expedition to the Great Plains and toward the Rocky Mountains emphasized measured observation and cartographic documentation. Its published reports included astronomical determinations of position, descriptions of river systems and gradients, and evaluations of potential transportation routes. Portions of the central plains were characterized in contemporary accounts as part of a “Great Desert,” reflecting prevailing assessments of the region’s agricultural limitations.

A final northern reconnaissance in 1823 included boundary-related surveys near Pembina, North Dakota and additional mapping in the Upper Mississippi region. In the same year, Long was elected to the American Philosophical Society.

Taken together, these expeditions established Long as one of the Army’s leading practitioner-engineers in applied topographical science. His work integrated field measurement, mechanical design, and analytical reporting, and provided a continental-scale understanding of river systems, terrain, and route constraints that later informed his engineering judgments in internal improvements and railroad location.

=== Internal improvements and railroad engineering (1824–1840) ===
Following his western expeditions, Long became closely involved in the federally authorized survey program established under the General Survey Act of 1824. This legislation permitted the use of United States Army engineers to examine routes for roads and canals deemed of national importance, linking military, commercial, and postal objectives.

Long’s participation in these surveys formed part of a broader federal practice in which West Point–trained engineers provided technical expertise for internal improvements at a time when civilian engineering remained underdeveloped in the United States. Wettemann characterizes this system as placing Army engineers at the center of early national infrastructure planning, though their involvement in projects with commercial as well as military value would later become politically contested.

During the mid-1820s, Long served on several survey assignments and engineering boards charged with evaluating transportation routes and the feasibility of construction. These duties included the examination of canal routes, road alignments, and river improvements, as well as participation in federal engineering boards that coordinated survey results and reported to Congress.

In this capacity, Long’s work extended the methods developed during his exploratory expeditions into a more formalized engineering context. Surveying techniques, route-selection criteria, and topographical analysis were applied directly to transportation infrastructure, marking a transition from reconnaissance to systematic engineering evaluation of national-scale improvements. Long’s work has been interpreted as part of the broader emergence of professional civil engineering practice in the United States during the early nineteenth century.

The federal survey program also provided an institutional pathway for Army engineers, including Long, to become involved in early railroad development. Requests from private companies and state governments for engineering assistance were often met through War Department authorization, bringing military-trained engineers into the planning and construction of transportation systems that combined public and private objectives.

==== Baltimore and Ohio Railroad ====
In 1827, shortly after the Baltimore and Ohio Railroad was chartered, the company requested federal engineering assistance under the General Survey Act of 1824. Secretary of War James Barbour approved the request, and three government surveying parties were assigned to the project.

One of these parties was headed by Long, who, together with Major William Gibbs McNeill and Dr. William Howard, directed the determination of the railroad’s initial route between 1827 and 1829. Hill notes that some fourteen Army engineers were engaged on the Baltimore and Ohio between 1827 and 1830. Long’s work on the B&O formed part of a broader pattern in which Army engineers applied military engineering practices to early railroad location, survey, and management.

Upon their return from a study tour of British railways in 1829, McNeill and Jonathan Knight served with Long on the company’s Board of Engineers. The Board was an internal engineering body charged with directing surveys, advising on route location, and establishing construction standards during the railroad’s first construction phase.

The Board represented an effort to apply federal engineering practice within a private railroad enterprise. Its members emphasized systematic survey, comparative route analysis, and design criteria for gradients, alignment, and structures. Conflicts soon developed between the Board and Caspar Wever, the railroad’s superintendent of construction, who exercised direct control over contractors and field operations. These disputes involved questions of authority, accounting procedures, and construction policy.

In their 1830 narrative of the Board’s proceedings, Long and McNeill argued that Wever’s administrative practices—shaped in part by his earlier experience on the National Road—were incompatible with the Board’s more formal system of engineering control. These claims reflected the engineers' perspective rather than an independently established finding.

The conflict culminated in 1830 with the dissolution of the Board of Engineers and the reorganization of the railroad’s engineering department under a single chief engineer, Jonathan Knight. Long’s association with the B&O ended at this point, and Army engineers assigned to the project were subsequently reassigned to other survey work.

Historians have interpreted the episode as illustrating both the difficulty of applying federal-style engineering governance within a private railroad enterprise and the transitional character of early railroad organization in the United States, as companies moved toward more hierarchical engineering structures.

Long’s withdrawal from the B&O marked the end of his direct involvement in its construction, but not his continued participation in railroad surveying and planning elsewhere in the United States.

==== Other railroad surveys ====
Long’s railroad work subsequently extended into regional planning in the South. In 1834, General Edmund P. Gaines proposed an east–west railroad linking Memphis with the South Atlantic coast and sent Long to survey the route. Long’s proposed line would have crossed northern Mississippi and Alabama, entered Georgia, and connected with the Georgia Railroad at Athens, forming part of a broader interregional transportation scheme.

===== Allegheny Portage Railroad =====
In Pennsylvania, Long examined alternative routes across the Allegheny Mountains as part of the state’s canal-and-rail system, the Allegheny Portage Railroad. In the jointly transmitted 1831 reports with Moncure Robinson, both engineers recommended a railroad rather than a macadamized highway for the mountain crossing, though they differed in alignment and in the mechanical treatment of inclined planes.

The reports reflect contemporary engineering debates over the relative merits of continuous-gradient railroads versus systems employing inclined planes with stationary power, as well as differing judgments regarding route alignment, grade control, and construction feasibility in mountainous terrain.

==== Mechanical experimentation and locomotive patents ====
Concurrent with his railroad survey work, Long pursued mechanical experimentation in steam locomotive design during the early 1830s. His work reflected the unsettled state of American locomotive technology, when engineers and mechanics were still testing boiler arrangements, adhesion, weight distribution, and the suitability of locomotives for American grades and curves.

He obtained patents covering aspects of locomotive construction and steam-engine operation and became associated with William Norris in Philadelphia, where his work contributed to early American locomotive development.

In 1832, Long entered into a partnership in the American Steam Carriage Company, an effort to commercialize his locomotive concepts. The firm dissolved by 1834, and Long subsequently withdrew from locomotive manufacturing.

His locomotive designs incorporated a number of novel features, including alternative boiler arrangements and mechanical components intended to improve efficiency and adaptability. However, they were not widely adopted in railroad service, and later historians have generally characterized his work as inventive but not commercially successful.

==== Timber bridge engineering and the Long truss ====
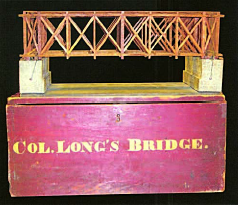
Scale model of the Long truss patent model

Problems encountered in railroad surveying and construction during the late 1820s and early 1830s formed the immediate context for Long’s turn to timber bridge design. At a time when American long-span bridges were commonly built according to empirically derived proportions, Long developed a truss system that combined adjustable compression bracing with simplified analytical proportioning of members.

In April 1830, Long received U.S. Patent No. 1,601 for an “Improvement in the Construction of Bridges,” followed by additional patents in 1836 and 1839 that refined joint configuration, lateral stability, and load transfer.

Danko identifies Long as “the first bridge designer to make a substantial attempt at applying scientific principles to the design of the simple truss bridge,” noting his use of contemporary statics, including the parallelogram of forces and simple-beam theory, in proportioning members. Frank Griggs similarly observes that Long sized individual members according to anticipated stress magnitudes rather than adopting uniform timber dimensions throughout the span.

The resulting configuration, later known as the Long truss, employed slightly overlength diagonal braces driven into compression by adjustable wedges, creating a system in which structural performance depended on maintained bearing and joint stiffness. Later analyses have emphasized that the wedges functioned less as a calibrated prestressing mechanism than as a means of improving bearing conditions and controlling deformation under load.

Although the Long truss was used in covered highway bridges and in early railroad applications during the 1830s, increasing locomotive axle loads and the growing availability of wrought iron led to the wider adoption of hybrid timber–iron systems such as the Howe truss in the 1840s. Long’s truss work is cited by later historians as marking a transitional stage in American bridge engineering between empirically proportioned timber systems and analytically conceived structural design.

==== Marine Hospitals and Napoleon, Arkansas ====
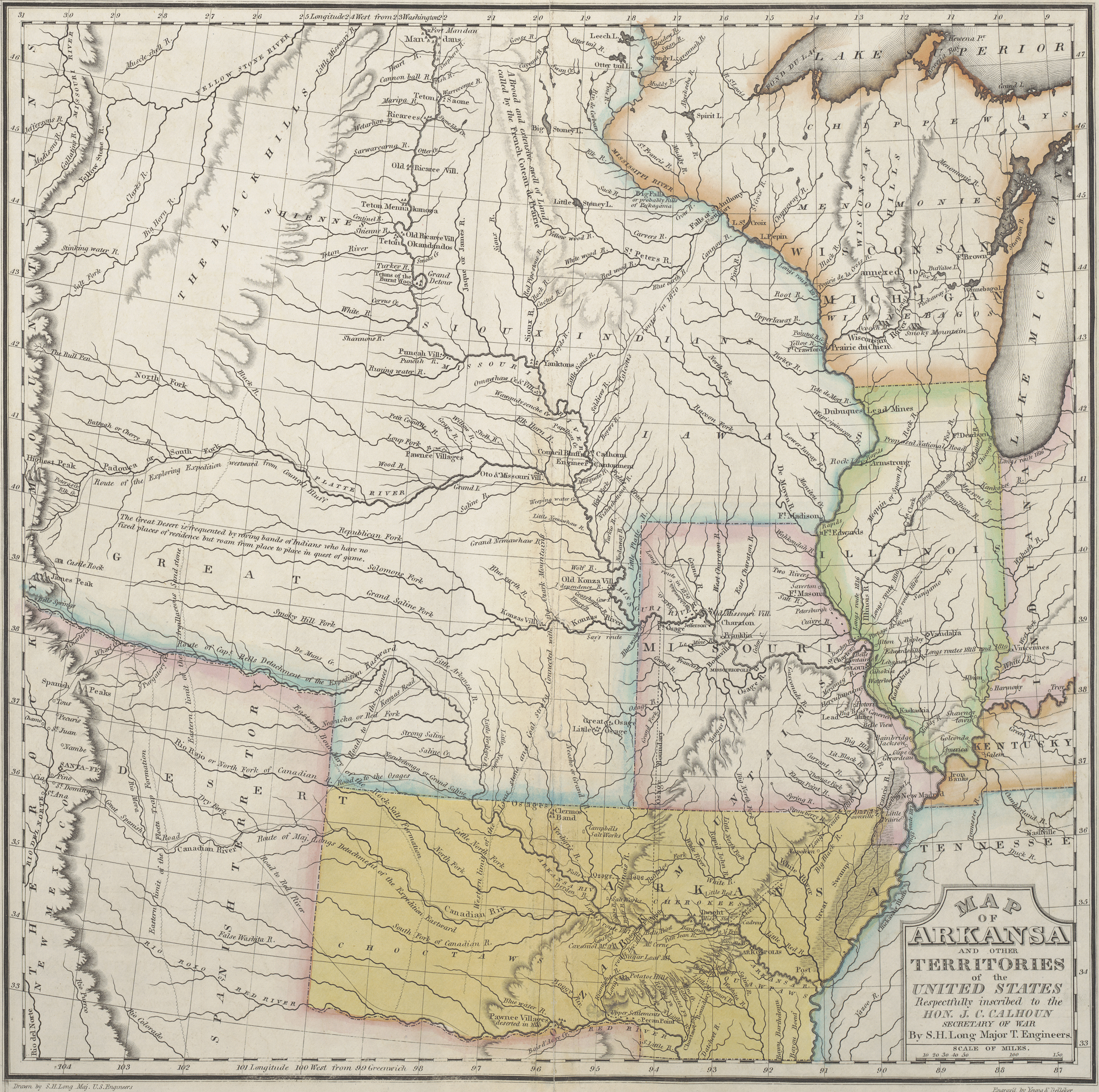
Geographical, Statistical and Historical Map of Arkansas Territory, after Stephen Harriman Long, 1822

In 1837, Congress authorized the construction of a system of United States Marine Hospitals to serve river and coastal seamen. Long, then serving in the Corps of Topographical Engineers, was assigned supervisory responsibility for several western river installations, including the hospital at Louisville, Kentucky. The hospitals were constructed according to plans prepared by architect Robert Mills, while Long oversaw site selection, foundation work, contracting, and construction progress.

Construction of the Louisville hospital proceeded in the mid-1840s after delays related to funding and administration. Long subsequently supervised additional marine hospital projects at Paducah, Kentucky; Natchez, Mississippi; and Napoleon, Arkansas.

In 1849, Long was directed to supervise construction of the Marine Hospital at Napoleon, Arkansas, located near the confluence of the Arkansas and Mississippi rivers. After surveying the site, he formally objected to the location on engineering grounds, citing bank instability and the risk of erosion and flooding. He recommended relocation to a more stable site at Helena, Arkansas, but construction at Napoleon proceeded despite these objections.

Construction was repeatedly disrupted by flooding, foundation instability, and expiring contracts. The hospital was completed in 1854 and opened in 1855. During the American Civil War, the town was burned in 1862, although the hospital structure survived the conflict.

Long’s assessment of the site proved accurate. By 1868, riverbank erosion had advanced to within approximately fifty feet of the building, and within weeks, a portion of the structure collapsed into the Mississippi River. Continued erosion ultimately destroyed the town of Napoleon.

The Marine Hospital at Louisville, Kentucky, which Long supervised but did not design, survives and was later designated a National Historic Landmark.

== Later life and death ==
Long retired from the United States Army Corps of Engineers in 1863 at the age of 78. He died on September 4, 1864, in Alton, Illinois, at the age of 79, and was interred there.

== Legacy ==
Long’s name is commemorated in both geographic features and the history of American engineering. The most prominent geographic feature is Longs Peak in Rocky Mountain National Park, Colorado, first identified during his 1820 expedition and later officially standardized by the U.S. Board on Geographic Names in 1911. The city of Longmont, Colorado, founded in 1871, derives its name from Longs Peak.

In engineering history, Long is recognized as an early figure in the transition from empirically based construction to analytically informed design in the United States. His development of the Long truss and his application of mathematical reasoning to bridge design have been cited by later historians as marking a transitional stage in nineteenth-century structural engineering. More broadly, his career has been interpreted as representative of an early generation of American engineers whose work spanned exploration, federal survey programs, and the planning and construction of transportation infrastructure, contributing to the emergence of a professional civil engineering practice in the United States.

Long’s work is also recognized in state and local historical marker programs. In Georgia, markers associated with the Western and Atlantic Railroad credit him as chief engineer for the original survey (1837–1840), including the “Zero Mile Post” marker in Atlanta. In New Hampshire, historical markers for Smith Bridge and Blair Bridge reference his patented timber truss design. A Kentucky historical marker at the former U.S. Marine Hospital in Louisville, Kentucky recognizes his supervisory role in its construction; the building, designed by Robert Mills, is the only surviving inland U.S. Marine hospital and was designated a National Historic Landmark in 1997.
