= Foster Family Home =

Historic house in Maine, United States

- U.S. National Register of Historic Places
- U.S. Historic district
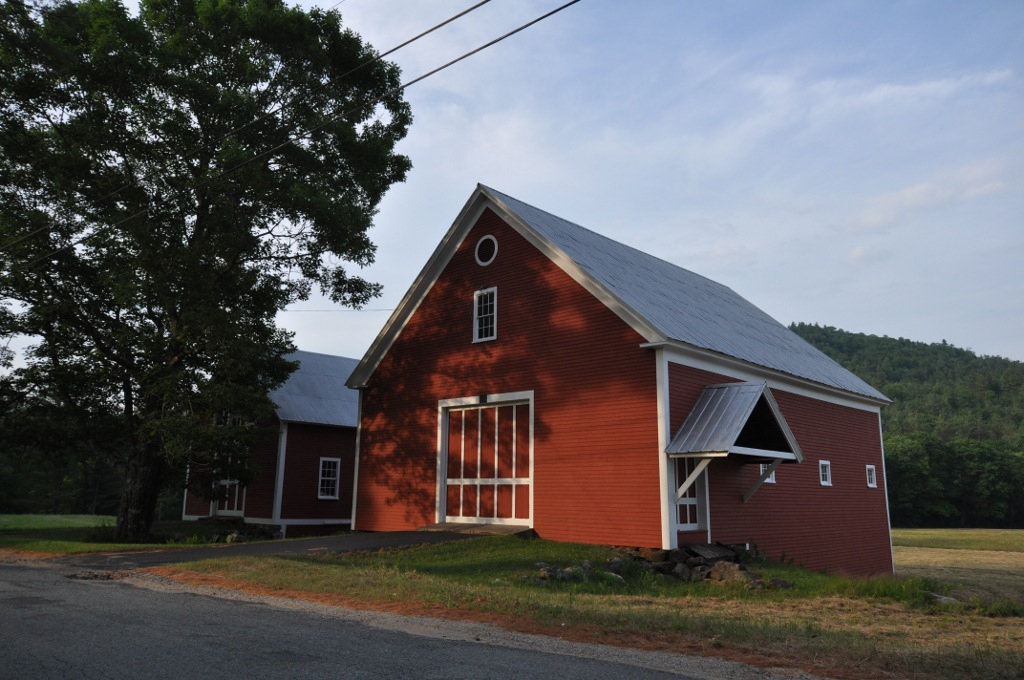
- Stable (left) and barn (right)

- Location within Maine Location within the United States
- Nearest city: Newry, Maine
- Area: 255 acres (103 ha)
- Built: 1850
- Architect: Hiram York
- Architectural style: Greek Revival
- NRHP reference No.: 94001247
- Added to NRHP: November 9, 1994

The Foster Family Home is a historic farmstead on Sunday River Road in Newry, Maine. The property includes a Greek Revival farmhouse, a barn and stable, and a cemetery in which many Fosters are interred. These improvements are situated near the Sunday River Bridge, a covered bridge spanning the Sunday River, and were developed mainly in the 19th century on land that has been in the Foster family since the early 19th century.

The main house consists of two blocks, built by Joel Foster, the first Foster to settle the land. Architectural evidence suggests that both were built in the 1850s, leaving open the question of where Foster's first house was located. The main block is the more northerly of the two; it has a front-facing gable with full pediment, overhanging a two-story porch supported by distinctively cut sawn supports. The southerly block, a two-story structure, has a side-gable configuration. The main block has two wide bays, with the main house entrance in the left bay; the ell is four small bays wide, and has a secondary entrance. which is flanked by shorter sidelight windows than the main entrance, and is topped by a triangular shallow pedimented hood. A 1 1/2-story gable-roof shed extends the house further to the south.

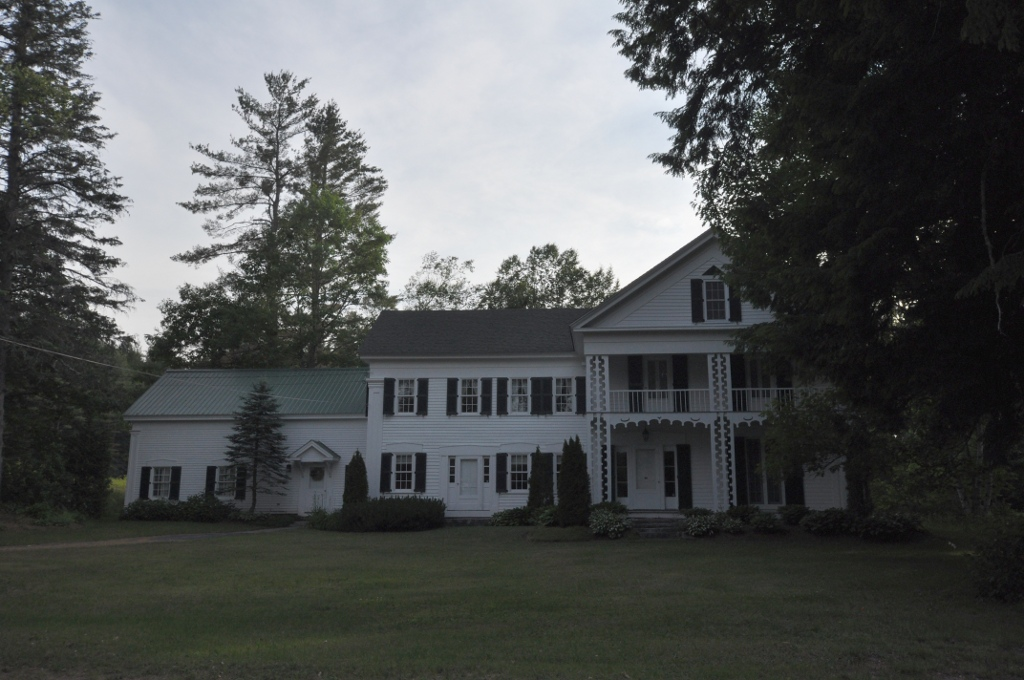
The main house

Across the street from the house stand the barn and stable, both built in the 1890s. Both are single-story wood-frame structures with the gable end toward the street. The barn stands south of the stable, and has a sliding door on the main facade, above which is a sash window and a round louvered vent. The side elevation has an entrance door sheltered by a portico. South of the house lies the family cemetery, a rectangular plot extending along the road.

The farm, including about 30 acres (12 ha) of fields and more than 200 acres (81 ha) of woodlands, was listed on the National Register of Historic Places in 1994.

== See also ==
- National Register of Historic Places listings in Oxford County, Maine
