= Arch Bridge (Bristol, Maine) =

- U.S. National Register of Historic Places
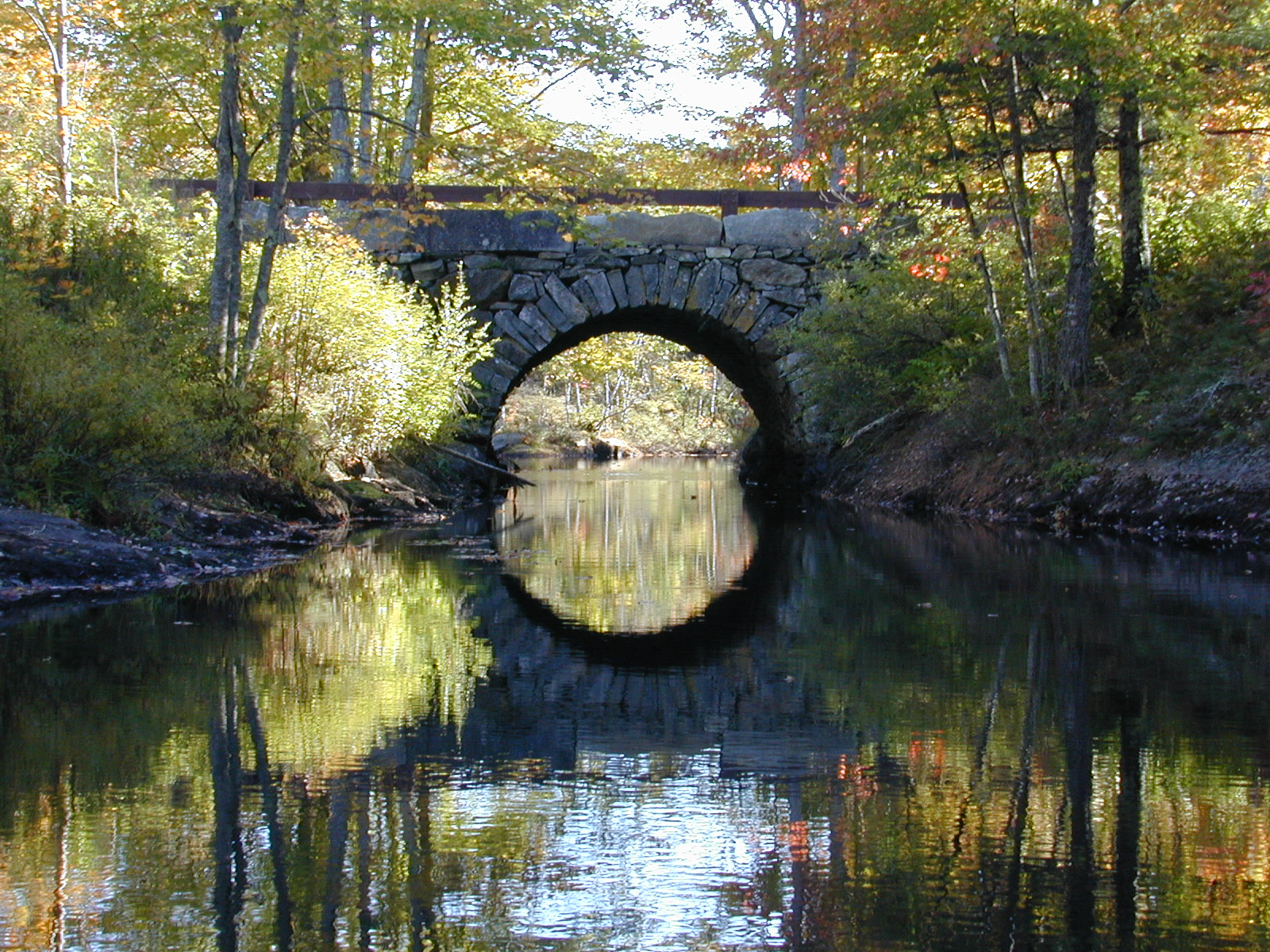

- Location within Maine Location within the United States
- Location: Over the Pemaquid River on Benner Rd., Bristol, Maine
- Coordinates: 43°57′44″N 69°30′35″W
- Area: 0.2 acres (0.081 ha)
- Built: between 1780 and 1807(British Embargo)
- Built by: Probably the Benner Family
- Architectural style: Stone arch bridge
- NRHP reference No.: 03000618
- Added to NRHP: July 24 2018

The Arch Bridge is a historic stone arch bridge, carrying Benner Road over the Pemaquid River near the village of Bristol Mills in Bristol, Maine. Probably built before 1800, it is one of the state's oldest stone bridges, and is remarkably well-preserved for its age. It was listed on the National Register of Historic Places in 2003.

== Description and history ==
The Pemaquid River roughly bisects the peninsula on the Maine coast that the town of Bristol occupies. The village of Bristol Mills is located near the peninsula's geographic center, stretching out along Bristol Road (Maine State Route 130). Near its northern end, Benner Road crosses the river just below the outlet of Biscay Pond, providing access from the village to the northeastern part of the peninsula. The bridge it crosses on is a dry-laid stone arch structure with span of 14 feet (4.3 m) and a total length of 21 feet (6.4 m). It is built out of field stone and roughly quarried stone and river cobbles, with its base laid directly on bedrock. The top of the arch is about 14 feet (4.3 m) above the bedrock, and it is built up another 4 feet (1.2 m) to the paved roadway. The sides of the bridge are lined with granite curbing and modern wooden guardrails.

The actual construction date of the bridge is unknown, but circumstantial evidence and its construction methodology suggest a date before 1800. Town records before 1825 and after 1895 give no indication of funding for a bridge at this location. Benner Road is found on 1795 and 1815 maps of the area, and an 1857 map clearly identifies an arched bridge at this location. Its construction method is consistent with a similar bridge on Upper Round Pond Road (replaced with a metal culvert in 1984). The bridge has needed only modest repairs since its construction.

== See also ==
- National Register of Historic Places listings in Lincoln County, Maine
- List of bridges on the National Register of Historic Places in Maine
