= Stone Arch Bridge =

Stone Arch Bridge may refer to:

In the United States:

(alphabetical by state, then city)

- Stone Arch Bridge (Champaign, Illinois), listed on the National Register of Historic Places (NRHP)
- Stone Arch Bridge (Danville, Illinois), NRHP-listed
- Stone Arch Bridge (Minneapolis), Minnesota, NRHP-listed
- Stone Arch Bridge (Keene, New Hampshire), NRHP-listed
- Old Stone Arch Bridge (Bound Brook, New Jersey), NRHP-listed
- Stone Arch Bridge (Keeseville, New York), NRHP-listed
- Stone Arch Bridge (Kenoza Lake, New York), NRHP-listed
- Stone Arch Bridge (Starrucca Creek), Starrucca, Pennsylvania, NRHP-listed
- Elm Grove Stone Arch Bridge (Wheeling, West Virginia), NRHP-listed
