= Robyville Bridge =

- U.S. National Register of Historic Places
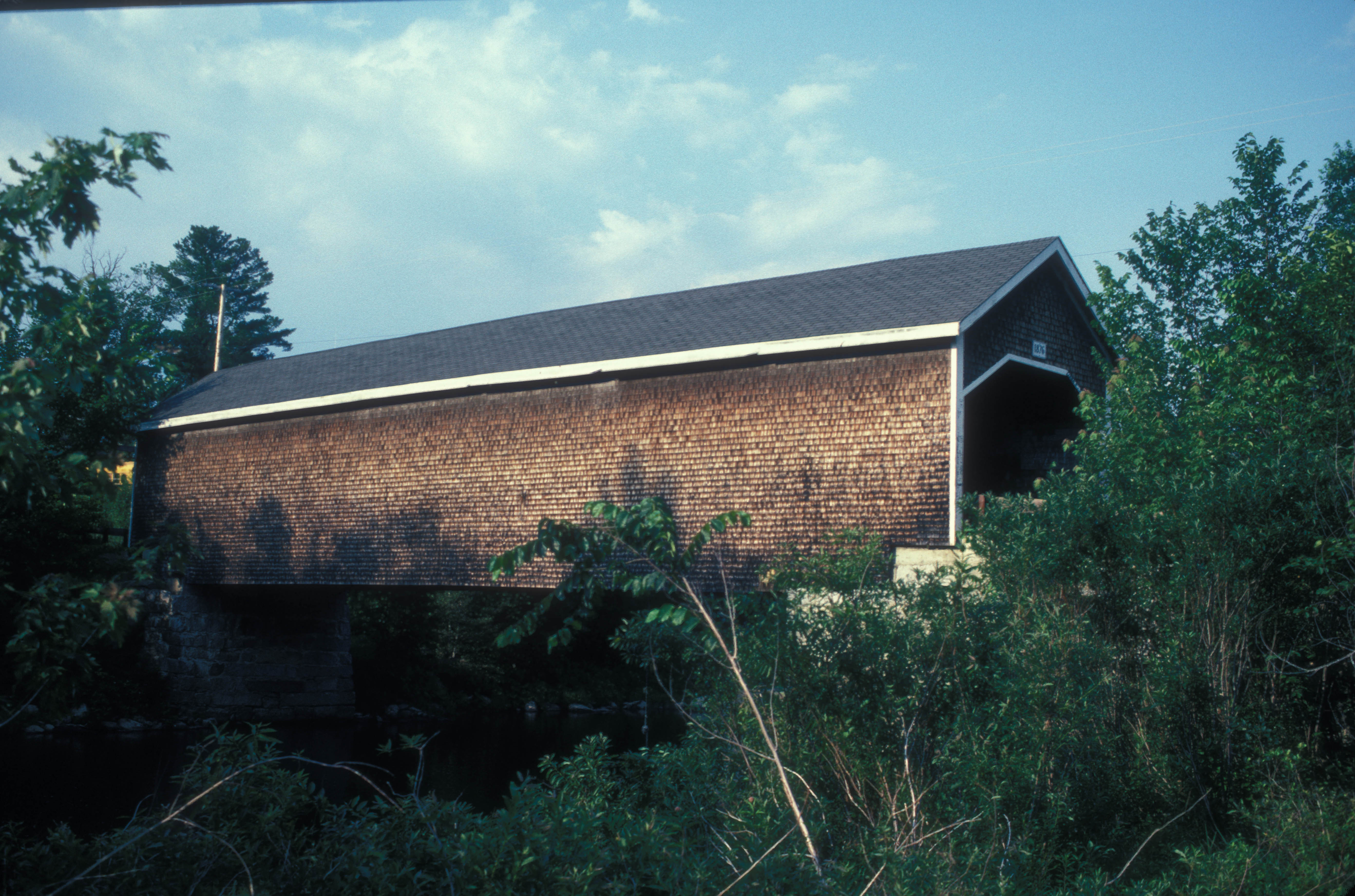
- The bridge in 1970

- Location within Maine Location within the United States
- Location: Over Kenduskeag Stream, Robyville, Corinth, Maine
- Coordinates: 44°56′35″N 68°58′8″W
- Area: 0.3 acres (0.12 ha)
- Built: 1876
- Architectural style: Howe Truss System
- NRHP reference No.: 70000061
- Added to NRHP: February 16, 1970

The Robyville Bridge is a historic covered bridge in Corinth, Maine. Built in 1876, this Howe truss bridge is one of the state's few surviving 19th-century covered bridges. It carries Covered Bridge Road across Kenduskeag Stream in the southern part of the rural community. It was listed on the National Register of Historic Places in 1970 and designated as a Maine Historic Civil Engineering Landmark by the American Society of Civil Engineers in 2002.

== Description and history ==
Kenduskeag Stream flows southeast across the rural town of Corinth en route to the Penobscot River at Bangor. The Robyville area of the town was for many years the site of sawmills, possibly dating to the community's early settlement in the late 18th century. It is unknown how many bridges may have stood at or near this location prior to the construction of this bridge in 1876.

The Robyville Bridge is oriented roughly north-south across the stream. It is a single-span structure 76 feet (23 m) long, with a portal clearance of 14 feet (4.3 m) and a total structure height of 16 feet (4.9 m). It is set on abutments fashioned out of large rough-cut granite blocks; the southern abutment has been reinforced in the 20th century with concrete. The bridge's trusses are a modified Howe truss, in which the king posts near the center of the span have been doubled, and some of the cross braces have also been doubled. Crossbeams join the trusses below the roadbed, which is built out of stringers that parallel the bed, planking running side to side, and a pair of spaced wheel runways. The bridge's walls are clad in wooden shingles, and its roof is covered in asphalt shingles. The bridge is open to traffic, and received major rehabilitation in 1984.

== See also ==
- National Register of Historic Places listings in Penobscot County, Maine
- List of bridges on the National Register of Historic Places in Maine
