= Lowes Bridge =

Bridge in Maine, US

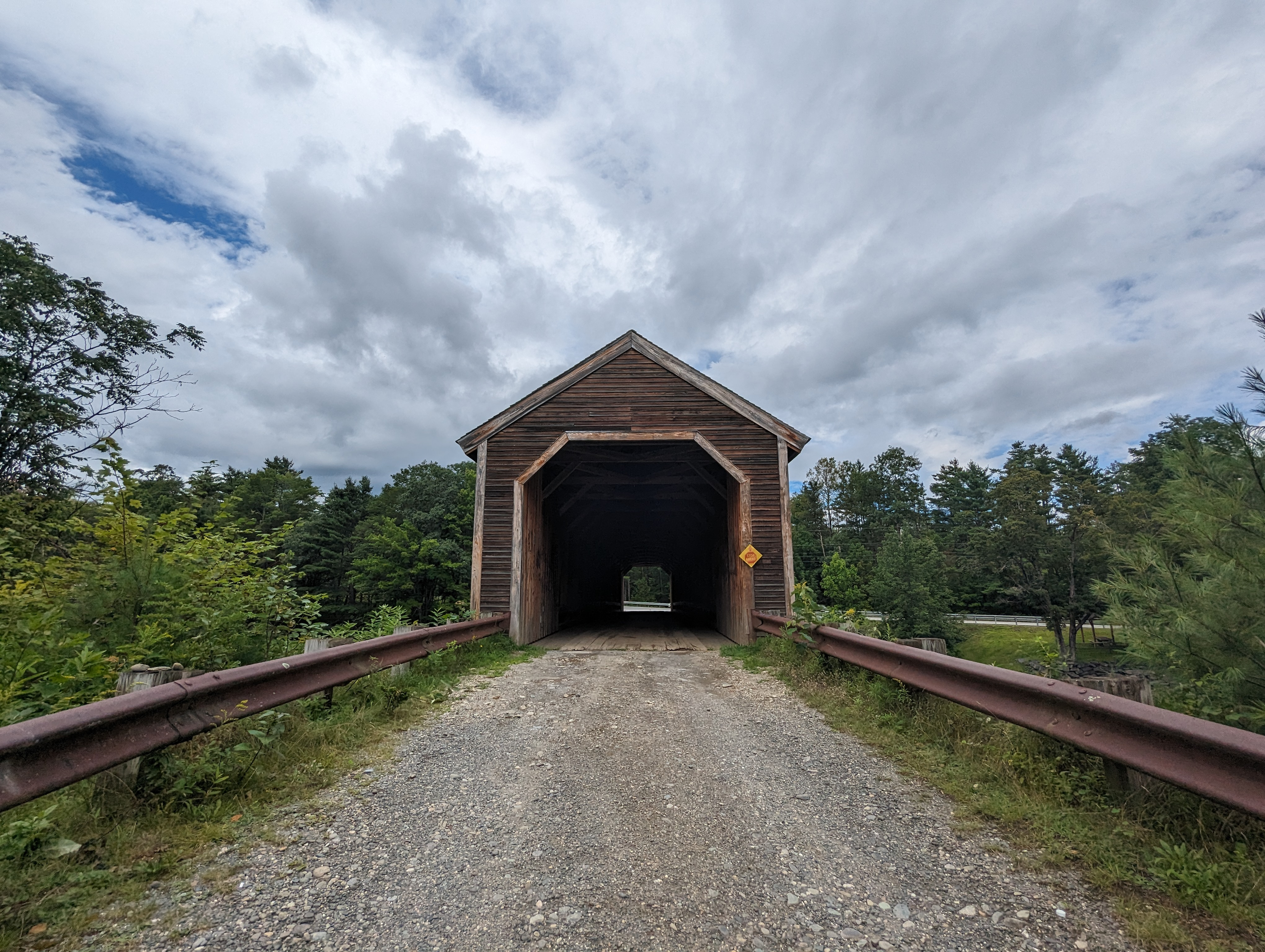
- Coordinates: 45°10′30″N 69°18′54″W
- Crosses: Piscataquis River
- Locale: Guilford, ME
- Owner: State Highway Agency
- Maintained by: State Highway Agency
- ID number: 01008

Characteristics
- Design: Wood or Timber Truss - Thru
- Total length: 46.7 metres (153 ft)
- Width: 5.9 metres (19 ft)
- Longest span: 39.6 metres (130 ft)
- Clearance above: 3.73 metres (12.2 ft)

History
- Opened: 1857
- Rebuilt: 1990

Statistics
- Daily traffic: 31
- Lowes Bridge
- Formerly listed on the U.S. National Register of Historic Places
- Location within Maine Location within the United States
- Nearest city: Guilford, Maine, US
- Coordinates: 45°10′29.9″N 69°18′54.3″W
- Built: 1857
- Architectural style: Long Truss
- NRHP reference No.: 70000062

Significant dates
- Added to NRHP: February 16, 1972
- Removed from NRHP: May 12, 1987

Lowes Bridge is a covered bridge in a rural part of Guilford, Maine. Built in 1857, this bridge was washed away by the flood of April 1, 1987. A modern covered bridge, patterned after the original, was built on the original abutments in 1990. The replacement was built to have a larger load-capacity and was raised in order to prevent damage from future flooding.

The bridge, located just off Route 15 south of Guilford Village, has a clear span of 120 feet over the Piscataquis River.
