= Pemaquid River =

Location
- Country: United States

Physical characteristics
- Source
  - location: Maine
  - elevation: 76 feet (23 m)
- Mouth
  - location: Johns Bay
  - coordinates: 43°52′41″N 69°31′30″W
  - elevation: sea level
- Length: 11 mi (18 km)

The 19-mile (31 km) Pemaquid River starts at Tobias Pond in Waldoboro and ends at Johns Bay, Bristol, Maine.

Distances from south to north:

- Mouth of Pemaquid Harbor to Route 130: 2.4 miles (3.9 km)
- Route 130 to Biscay Pond (at point where river exits the pond): 7.7 miles (12.4 km); Total from harbor mouth: 10.1 miles
- Biscay Pond (full length): 2.7 miles; Total from harbor mouth: 12.8 miles
- Pemaquid Pond (full length to Route 1): 6.1 miles; Total from harbor mouth: 18.9 miles (30.4 km).

The Pemaquid River watershed covers parts of six towns and is 46.9 square miles in size, of which 5.4 sq miles is water and 41.5 sq miles is land.

The Pemaquid River watershed includes the sub-watersheds that flow into the Pemaquid River or into Pemaquid Harbor (including Little Falls Brook, which flows into Pemaquid Harbor, and Beaver Dam Brook, which flows into Duckpuddle Pond). It also includes the coastline down to Pemaquid Point on Johns Bay on the west side of the peninsula. The Pemaquid River watershed boundary goes through the summits of Johnston Hill and Cordwood Hill on the east and Eugley Hill at the northern tip. The Pemaquid River watershed includes 11 ponds.

== See also ==
- List of rivers of Maine
