= Long truss =

Timber bridge truss system developed by Stephen H. Long

The Long truss is a timber truss bridge system developed by Stephen Harriman Long and first realized in the Jackson Bridge, built in Baltimore in 1829 to carry a highway over the Baltimore and Ohio Railroad. First patented in 1830, subsequently refined through additional patents in 1836 and 1839, and promoted through builder-oriented pamphlets, the system combined adjustable, wedge-tightened joints with early analytical methods used to proportion members and relate geometry to structural behavior. The term "Long truss" thus refers to a family of related configurations defined by this sequence of patents rather than a single fixed structural form.

In bridge-history scholarship, the Long truss is treated as an early American example of theory-informed timber design and as part of the transition from empirically proportioned carpentry systems to analytically proportioned trusses. Its design incorporated parallel chords and cross-braced panels proportioned by beam analogies, while its structural performance depended on maintaining compression in timber members and joints through wedge adjustment.

The system’s reliance on prestressed timber elements introduced both its principal innovation and its principal limitation: while wedge-induced precompression allowed nominal tension members to participate in load carrying, the long-term stability of the structure depended on maintaining joint tightness in the presence of shrinkage, wear, and repeated loading.

Earlier American timber systems such as the Burr arch truss and Town lattice truss relied primarily on empirical proportioning and distributed load paths. In contrast, Long introduced analytically proportioned panel trusses with defined force paths, a development subsequently extended in the Howe truss through the use of iron tension members to achieve more stable, determinate load transfer.

Within the broader development of nineteenth-century bridge engineering, the Long truss is therefore interpreted as a transitional form linking earlier empirically derived timber systems to later hybrid and iron-reinforced trusses. Subsequent designs—most notably the Howe truss—replaced adjustable timber prestressing with iron tension members, providing greater reliability under increasing railroad loads.

Later historians have accordingly classified the Long truss as one of the principal early parallel-chord truss forms in the United States, significantly less as a fixed configuration than as a step toward analytically grounded structural design and the eventual standardization of timber–iron systems.

== Background ==
The Long truss emerged during a transitional period in American bridge engineering, following the dominance of arch-dependent timber systems such as the Burr arch truss and the distributive web of the Town lattice truss, and preceding the analytically proportioned timber–iron trusses that appeared in the 1840s, notably the Howe truss.

Early American timber bridges were typically proportioned by empirical rules derived from carpentry practice, with structural behavior understood qualitatively rather than through formal analysis. The expansion of railroad construction in the late 1820s and 1830s introduced heavier and more concentrated loads, increased dynamic effects, and greater demands for stiffness over longer spans, exposing limitations in earlier timber truss forms.

Within this context, Long’s work on the Baltimore and Ohio Railroad, particularly the design of the Jackson Bridge, represented one of the earliest sustained attempts to apply analytical reasoning to timber truss design.

== Design and analysis ==
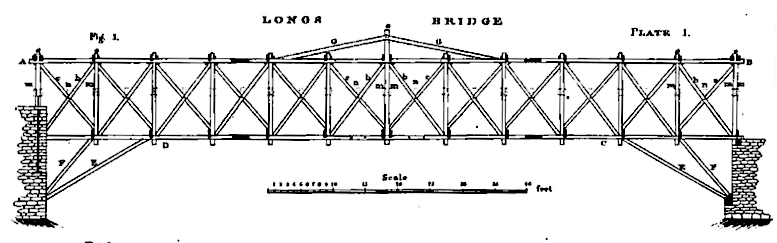
Long truss configuration as used in the Jackson Bridge (1829), Baltimore

The Long truss combined a distinctive system of adjustable timber joints with an early attempt to apply analytical methods to the design of timber truss bridges. A defining feature was the use of adjustable timber wedges at the interfaces between diagonal braces, vertical posts, and chords, allowing joints to be tightened and maintaining compression in the bracing system during service.

Danko identifies Long as "the first bridge designer to make a substantial attempt at applying scientific principles to the design of the simple truss bridge," noting his use of contemporary statics (including the parallelogram of forces) and simple-beam theory in proportioning elements of the structure.

In this account, Long applied theoretical mechanics to size at least a primary member based on assumed loading, thereby shifting toward theory-informed proportioning rather than reliance on uniform empirical dimensions.

Long's 1830 Jackson Bridge pamphlet provides builders with tabulated guidance relating span length and loading assumptions to member dimensions (including chords and braces), including tables prescribing chord areas with corresponding load capacities for simple spans. This material reflects an effort to translate analytical ideas into practical proportioning rules. However, while capacities are stated, the underlying representative live loads are not explicitly specified in the manner later seen in Whipple (1847).

Unlike earlier American timber trusses, which relied primarily on empirical increases in member size, the Long truss coordinated geometry and member proportions with calculated structural behavior. Griggs similarly treats the design as an early example of stress-conscious proportioning in timber bridge construction.

Historians have interpreted Long’s analytical approach as implying consideration of representative live loads and of load transfer in continuous-span construction, even though such assumptions were not explicitly stated in published form. Explicit numerical assumptions for bridge live loads do not appear in print until Squire Whipple's Essay No. II (1847).

Edwards also distinguishes Long’s treatment of continuous spans from earlier practice. While the Town lattice truss was sometimes constructed continuously over piers, its published specifications did not clearly address load transfer at supports. By contrast, Long’s pamphlets provided explicit directions for the construction of continuous spans and for transferring loads to substructure elements, suggesting an early recognition of the load-reaction problem in American bridge engineering.

== Structural configuration ==
The Long truss is commonly described as a panelized, parallel-chord timber truss consisting of:

- parallel timber upper and lower chords
- vertical timber posts dividing the span into panels
- diagonal timber braces within each panel
- adjustable wedge mechanisms at brace–post–chord interfaces

In this configuration, the system relied primarily on timber members acting in compression, with force transfer governed by bearing at shouldered joints rather than by metal fasteners. Bolts were used chiefly to secure alignment and resist separation rather than to define a pinned load path.

A distinguishing feature was the use of timber wedges inserted at the interfaces between diagonal braces, vertical posts, and chords. Tightening the wedges increased bearing and maintained compression in the bracing system, allowing both diagonals to contribute to stiffness under moving loads and reducing “trembling, springing, and oscillation” in service. The ability to re-drive the wedges also permitted the use of unseasoned (“green”) timber, in contrast to contemporary practice that relied on seasoned members to limit shrinkage and joint loosening.

Although Long’s design reflected an advanced understanding of load behavior, it remained constrained by the material and jointing limitations of timber construction, particularly the relative weakness of wood in tension and the susceptibility of shouldered connections in vertical members to shear failure under sustained loading.

A further limitation lay in the transfer of floor-beam loads to vertical tension posts via shouldered joints, which could produce shear stresses that could lead to deterioration over time. This weakness was later addressed in iron-reinforced designs, most notably in William Howe’s 1840 truss patent.

Long subsequently modified the basic panelized truss in later patent work. His 1836 and 1839 patents emphasized improvements in stiffness, load transfer, and lateral stability, including alternative diagonal arrangements and systems to restrain out-of-plane chord movement, rather than a complete departure from the original configuration.

=== Joint mechanics and "prestressing" interpretations ===
The wedge system has sometimes been described as a form of prestressing; however, Pierce cautions that this interpretation is valid only under simplified assumptions. In multi-panel trusses, wedges appear to function primarily by increasing the effective bearing area and reducing high-side-grain compression stresses at post–chord interfaces, rather than by imposing a calibrated global prestress state. Variations in wedge placement—for example, at the lower chord only versus at both chords—further suggest that wedge use was not uniformly applied as a standardized prestressing mechanism.

=== Structural indeterminacy and behavior ===
Danko characterizes the Long truss as structurally indeterminate in practice, with force distribution dependent on relative member stiffness, joint conditions, and the maintenance of diagonal compression through wedge adjustment. Because the system did not behave as an idealized pinned, statically determinate truss, force paths could shift over time due to timber shrinkage, moisture cycling, and variations in joint tightness.

== Patent history and development ==
Long's truss design was first embodied in the Jackson Bridge (1829), which carried the Washington Turnpike over the Baltimore and Ohio Railroad. The configuration presented in his 1830 patent (U.S. Patent 5862X) described a parallel-chord timber truss divided into panels by vertical posts and reinforced by diagonal braces tightened into compression by adjustable wedges.

A subsequent patent granted in 1836 (U.S. Patent 9340X) addressed lateral stiffness, introducing a system intended to restrain out-of-plane movement of the top chord. This has been interpreted as an auxiliary structural system rather than a new primary truss form.

In 1839, Long obtained multiple additional bridge-related patents (U.S. Patents 1,397 and 1,398) covering distinct structural concepts rather than a single revision of the original truss. These included:

- revised parallel-chord truss arrangements with altered diagonal orientation and panel geometry;
- alternative structural configurations intended to modify load distribution and stiffness behavior; and
- a separate suspension-type bridge system.

Taken together, the 1839 patents indicate that Long’s work extended beyond a single fixed truss form to a broader experimental program addressing stiffness, load transfer, and structural configuration in timber bridge design.

Patent drawings for the 1830 system included upper arch-like braces; however, these elements were apparently not employed in the Jackson Bridge itself and saw little subsequent use.

Long promoted his bridge system through printed pamphlets, including an 1830 Baltimore printing titled Description of Jackson Bridge, together with Directions to Builders of Wooden or Frame Bridges and an 1836 Concord, New Hampshire printing titled Description of Col. Long's Bridges, Together with a Series of Directions to Bridge Builders.

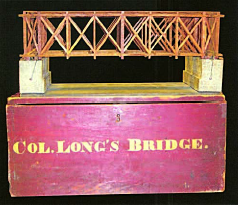
Demonstration model of the Long truss used to illustrate the design’s intended load path and stiffness under applied loads, as part of Long’s promotion of the system

Long also employed demonstration models to communicate load paths and stiffness behavior to prospective clients and builders, complementing his printed pamphlets.

== Applications and diffusion ==
The Long truss was first applied in the Jackson Bridge in Baltimore, which carried the Washington Turnpike over the Baltimore and Ohio Railroad and has been described as the first separate grade crossing of a railroad in the United States.

Following this initial application, the system was adopted for covered highway bridges in New England and the Mid-Atlantic states during the 1830s and 1840s. Long actively promoted the design through a network of agents; by 1836, twenty-six agents operating in eleven states were engaged in marketing and constructing bridges of his patented type.

The Long truss also saw limited early use in railroad applications. However, increasing axle loads and the growing demands of railroad service exposed limitations in timber-only systems—particularly the weakness of wood in tension—contributing to the subsequent adoption of hybrid timber–iron designs such as the Howe truss.

Pierce estimates that approximately twenty-five covered bridges supported by some variation of the Long system remain extant, though classification varies due to later alterations and hybridization.

== Surviving examples ==
Numerous covered bridges in the northeastern United States are classified as Long truss or Long-type truss structures. Many surviving examples have been documented by the Historic American Engineering Record (HAER) as part of the National Historic Covered Bridge Preservation Program; reported survival counts vary due to modifications and restorations.

Representative examples often cited in the literature include:

- Bement Covered Bridge (New Hampshire)
- Hamden Covered Bridge (New York)
- Blair Bridge (New Hampshire)

Precise structural classification of individual bridges typically requires inspection of joint details, shoulder geometry, and wedge mechanisms.

== Comparison with contemporary trusses ==
The Long truss differed from several contemporaneous American timber and timber–iron truss systems:

- Burr arch truss – combines arch action with a truss, relying on the arch for primary load carrying and the truss for stiffening.
- Town lattice truss – distributes forces through a dense lattice web, relying on redundancy and multiple load paths rather than on discrete, stress-identified members.
- Howe truss – uses iron vertical tension rods with timber compression members, providing more direct and mechanically defined force paths and reducing reliance on timber bearing surfaces.
- Pratt truss – reverses diagonal force orientation (tension diagonals, compression verticals) and became dominant in later iron and steel construction.

In later bridge-history accounts, the transition from the Long truss to the Howe truss is treated as part of a broader shift from timber compression systems dependent on bearing and friction at joints to hybrid systems incorporating iron tension members and more readily controlled force paths. One driver of this transition was the recognized weakness of timber vertical tension members in Long-type trusses, where shear at shouldered connections could lead to deterioration over time; Howe's use of iron tension rods directly addressed this limitation.

== Engineering significance ==
Historians of engineering have identified the Long truss as an early American example of deliberate analytical design applied to timber bridge construction. Later scholarship has emphasized Long's role in introducing European analytical methods into American bridge design. Drawing on the work of Claude-Louis Navier, Long applied theoretical principles to the proportioning of timber trusses and published tables relating chord areas to load capacity. Nineteenth-century engineer Karl Culmann examined Long's work in detail and concluded that Long had correctly applied analytical methods to determine internal forces, including the use of distributed live-load assumptions and consistent stress limits.

The rapid adoption of the Howe truss after 1840 has been attributed in part to the substitution of iron vertical tension members for wood, which eliminated a principal weakness in Long's system and facilitated more reliable prestressing. The practical success of Howe's early railroad bridges—particularly the Connecticut River bridge at Springfield, Massachusetts—demonstrated the advantages of iron-reinforced systems under increasing loads and played a critical role in accelerating the displacement of Long-type timber trusses in railroad service.

In this context, the Long truss is generally interpreted as a transitional system. While it incorporated early analytical proportioning and coordinated geometry, its performance remained dependent on timber bearing and wedge adjustment. Subsequent timber–iron trusses of the 1840s, including the Howe and Pratt systems, provided more reliable and more readily controlled force paths under increasing service loads.

In preservation scholarship, the Long truss is treated as one of the formative patented American truss types of the early nineteenth century, significant both for its mechanical conception and for its role in the professionalization of American bridge engineering.
