= Littleton, Maine =

Town in Maine, United States

- Town
- Location of Littleton, Maine
- Coordinates: 46°14′45″N 67°51′38″W
- Country: United States
- State: Maine
- County: Aroostook

Area
  - Total: 38.55 sq mi (99.84 km^{2})
  - Land: 38.36 sq mi (99.35 km^{2})
  - Water: 0.19 sq mi (0.49 km^{2})
- Elevation: 482 ft (147 m)

Population (2020)
  - Total: 997
  - Density: 26/sq mi (10/km^{2})
- Time zone: UTC-5 (Eastern (EST))
  - Summer (DST): UTC-4 (EDT)
- ZIP code: 04730
- Area code: 207
- FIPS code: 23-40595
- GNIS feature ID: 582565

Littleton is a town in Aroostook County, Maine, United States. The population was 997 at the 2020 census.

== History ==
In 1800, the southern half of the town was given as a land grant to Williams College and in 1801, the northern half was given as a grant to Framingham Academy. Settlement began shortly thereafter, and the town was incorporated in 1856.

== Geography ==
According to the United States Census Bureau, the town has a total area of 38.55 square miles (99.84 km^{2}), of which 38.36 square miles (99.35 km^{2}) is land and 0.19 square miles (0.49 km^{2}) is water.

== Demographics ==
Historical population
Census	Pop.	Note	%±
1860	543		—
1870	700		28.9%
1880	904		29.1%
1890	924		2.2%
1900	956		3.5%
1910	1,026		7.3%
1920	1,049		2.2%
1930	1,035		−1.3%
1940	1,049		1.4%
1950	1,001		−4.6%
1960	982		−1.9%
1970	958		−2.4%
1980	1,009		5.3%
1990	956		−5.3%
2000	955		−0.1%
2010	1,068		11.8%
2020	997		−6.6%
U.S. Decennial Census

=== 2010 census ===
As of the census of 2010, there were 1,068 people, 420 households, and 290 families living in the town. The population density was 27.8 inhabitants per square mile (10.7/km^{2}). There were 469 housing units at an average density of 12.2 per square mile (4.7/km^{2}). The racial makeup of the town was 91.7% White, 0.3% African American, 6.6% Native American, 0.1% from other races, and 1.3% from two or more races. Hispanic or Latino of any race were 1.6% of the population.

There were 420 households, of which 33.1% had children under the age of 18 living with them, 54.8% were married couples living together, 8.3% had a female householder with no husband present, 6.0% had a male householder with no wife present, and 31.0% were non-families. 25.5% of all households were made up of individuals, and 11.9% had someone living alone who was 65 years of age or older. The average household size was 2.54 and the average family size was 3.01.

The median age in the town was 40.8 years. 25.4% of residents were under the age of 18; 6.4% were between the ages of 18 and 24; 23.2% were from 25 to 44; 29.4% were from 45 to 64; and 15.7% were 65 years of age or older. The gender makeup of the town was 52.1% male and 47.9% female.

=== 2000 census ===
As of the census of 2000, there were 955 people, 371 households, and 273 families living in the town. The population density was 24.9 inhabitants per square mile (9.6/km^{2}). There were 447 housing units at an average density of 11.6 per square mile (4.5/km^{2}). The racial makeup of the town was 97.49% White, 0.10% African American, 1.47% Native American, 0.31% Asian, 0.10% Pacific Islander, and 0.52% from two or more races. Hispanic or Latino of any race were 0.84% of the population.

There were 371 households, out of which 32.1% had children under the age of 18 living with them, 65.2% were married couples living together, 4.3% had a female householder with no husband present, and 26.4% were non-families. 20.8% of all households were made up of individuals, and 10.2% had someone living alone who was 65 years of age or older. The average household size was 2.57 and the average family size was 2.93.

In the town, the population was spread out, with 23.6% under the age of 18, 8.0% from 18 to 24, 25.0% from 25 to 44, 27.4% from 45 to 64, and 16.0% who were 65 years of age or older. The median age was 40 years. For every 100 females, there were 99.0 males. For every 100 females age 18 and over, there were 99.5 males.

The median income for a household in the town was $31,172, and the median income for a family was $35,759. Males had a median income of $24,167 versus $20,000 for females. The per capita income for the town was $13,579. About 7.9% of families and 13.2% of the population were below the poverty line, including 11.6% of those under age 18 and 25.0% of those age 65 or over.
