= Peter Paddleford =

Peter Paddleford (1785–1859) was a covered bridge builder who designed a new wooden bridge truss, one he never patented. The design was used widely throughout New Hampshire, Maine, and Eastern Vermont during much of the 19th century. Paddleford was also a millwright.

== Biography ==
Peter Paddleford was born in Enfield, New Hampshire on September 14, 1785. He moved with his father, Philip, to Monroe, New Hampshire, in the early 1800s. In 1816, the younger Paddleford was issued US Patent 2,594X. The spinning device patented is not recorded as having been produced. In 1830 Peter moved to Littleton, New Hampshire, where he spent most of his remaining years.

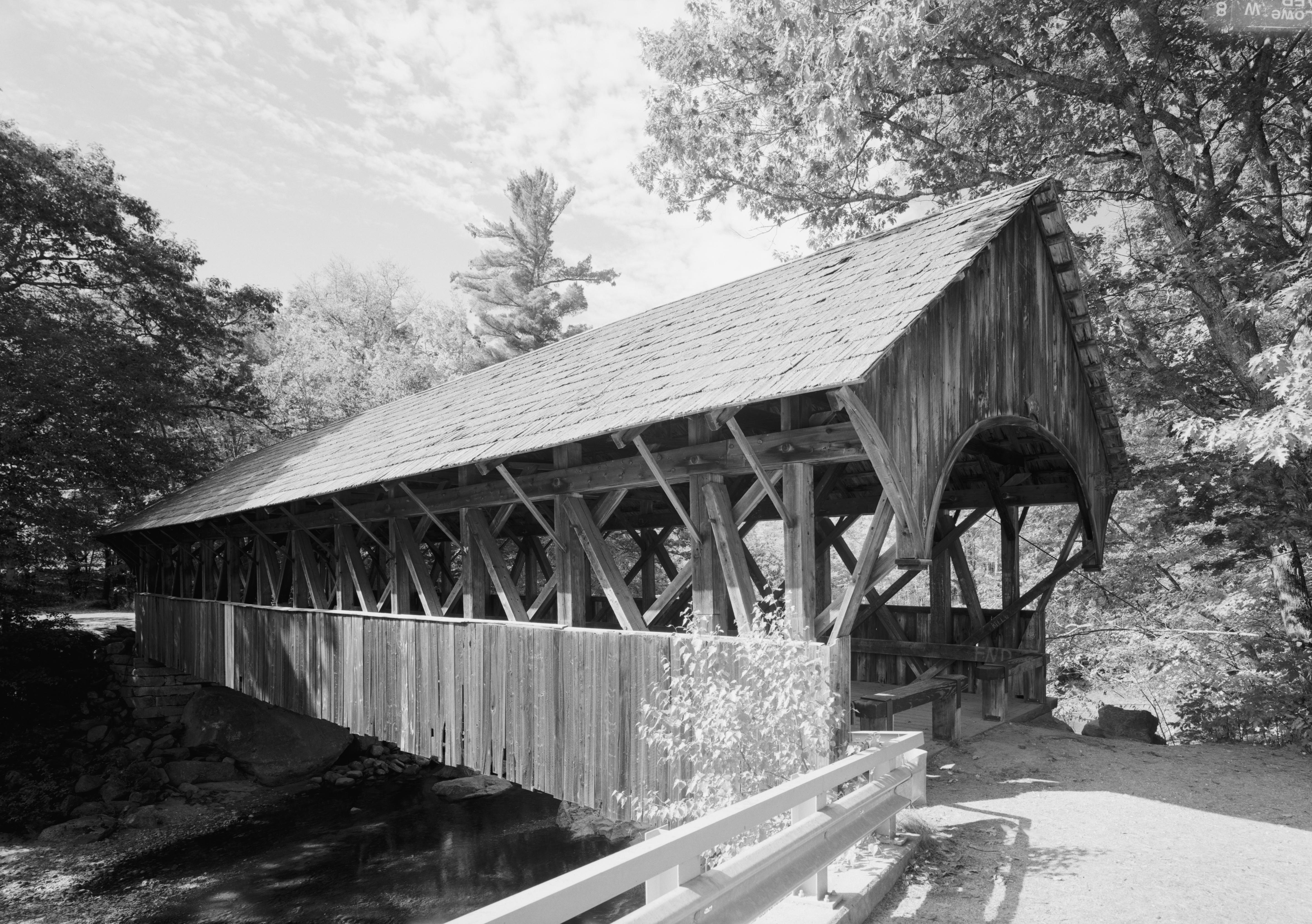
Bridge spanning the Sunday River, Oxford County, Maine

In 1833, Paddleford unsuccessfully participated in a bid to build a bridge from Montreal, Canada island. In other bridges, Paddleford first utilised the Long truss design, but later created his own. This was challenged by others, who thought that Paddleford had stolen from the earlier designer. Paddleford never recorded his patent and it was used by others. His truss "superficially resembles the Long truss", but they had different purposes. Paddleford's design saw wide use, especially in New Hampshire, Orleans County, Vermont, and Caledonia County, Vermont.

His first self-designed bridge was possibly Joel's Bridge in Conway, New Hampshire, which was constructed in 1846, working in partnership with his son Philip. Peter Paddleford retired in 1849, although Philip continued to build bridges. Paddleford died on October 18, 1859.

== See also ==
- List of New Hampshire covered bridges
- Swiftwater Covered Bridge
- List of Vermont covered bridges
