= Fort Knox (Maine) =

Fort in Maine, United States

- U.S. National Register of Historic Places
- U.S. National Historic Landmark
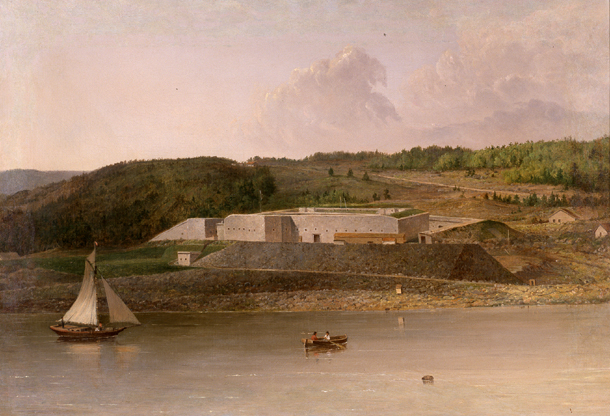
- Fort Knox, Maine painting by Seth Eastman done between 1870 and 1875

- Location within Maine
- Interactive map of Fort Knox
- Location: Prospect, Maine
- Coordinates: 44°33′58.3″N 68°48′8.7″W
- Area: 124 acres (50 ha)
- Built: 1844
- Architect: Colonel Joseph G. Totten, US Army Corps of Engineers
- Visitation: 111,781 (2024)
- NRHP reference No.: 69000023

Significant dates
- Added to NRHP: October 1, 1969
- Designated NHL: December 30, 1970

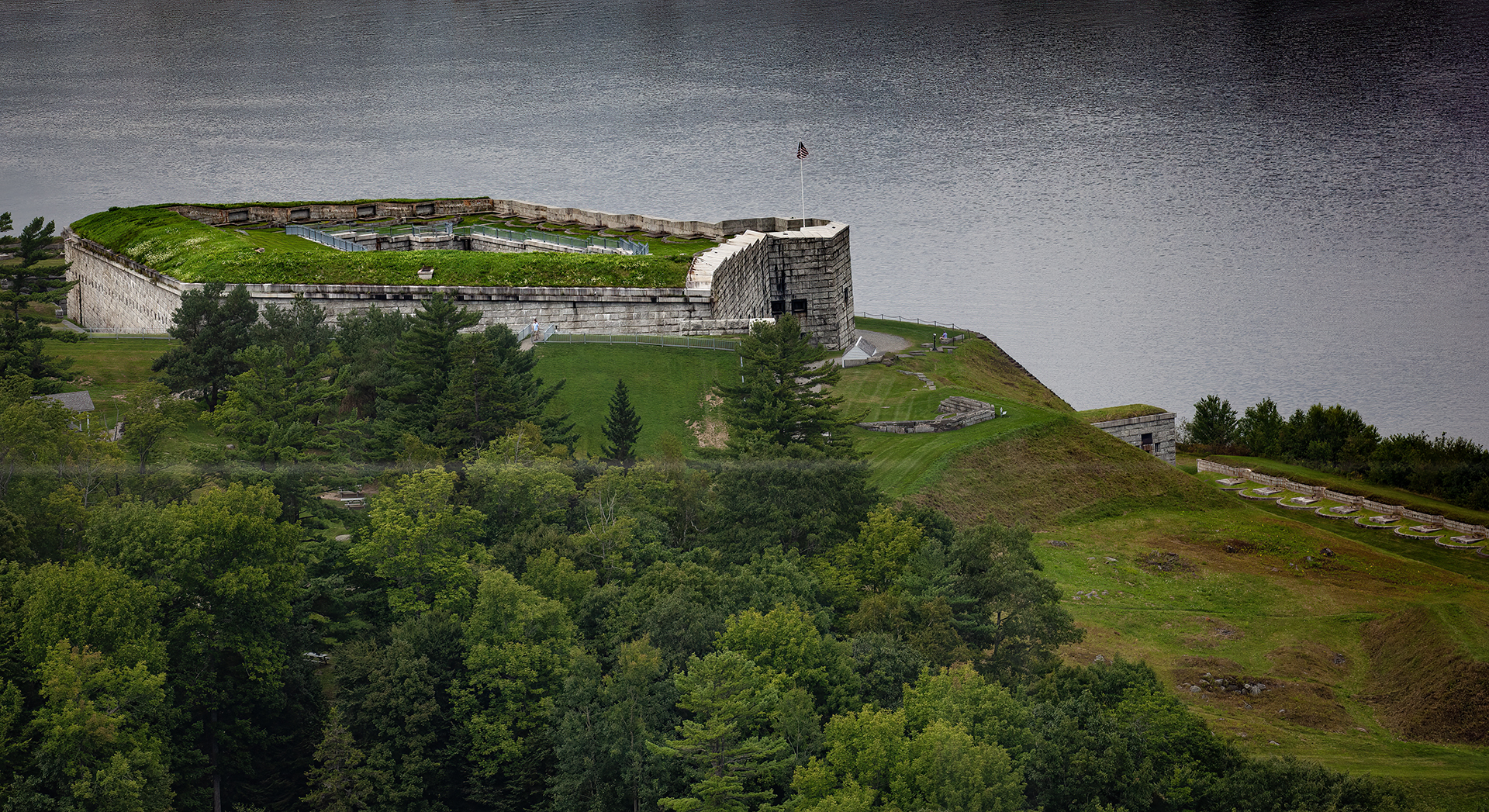
Fort Knox ME as seen from the Penobscot Narrows Bridge, 2014

Fort Knox, now Fort Knox State Park or Fort Knox State Historic Site, is located on the western bank of the Penobscot River in the town of Prospect, Maine, about 5 miles (8.0 km) from the mouth of the river. Built between 1844 and 1869, it was the first fort in Maine built entirely of granite; most previous forts used wood, earth, and stone. It is named after Major General Henry Knox, the first U.S. Secretary of War and Commander of Artillery during the American Revolutionary War, who at the end of his life lived not far away in Thomaston. As a virtually intact example of a mid-19th century granite coastal fortification, it was added to the National Register of Historic Places in 1969 and declared a National Historic Landmark on December 30, 1970. Fort Knox also serves as the entry site for the observation tower of the Penobscot Narrows Bridge that opened to the public in 2007.

== History ==
=== Background ===
Local memory of the humiliation of Maine at the hands of the British during the American Revolution and again during the War of 1812 contributed to subsequent anti-British feeling in Eastern Maine. The Penobscot Expedition of 1779 aimed to force the British from New Ireland (Maine), but ended in a debacle. The Americans lost 43 ships and suffered approximately 500 casualties in the worst naval defeat for the United States prior to the Japanese attack on Pearl Harbor. Then in autumn 1814, during the War of 1812, a British naval force and soldiers sailed up the Penobscot and defeated an outnumbered American force in the Battle of Hampden. The British followed their victory by looting both Hampden and Bangor. The American defeat contributed to the post-war movement for Maine's statehood, which occurred in 1820, as Massachusetts had failed to protect the region.

The Aroostook War of 1838-1839 revived anti-British feeling and concern over the vulnerability of the region to another attack like that of 1814. Also, the Penobscot valley and Bangor were major sources of shipbuilding lumber. The response was the inclusion of the Penobscot in the Third System of coastal fortifications, and the construction of Fort Knox, a large, expensive, granite fort at the mouth of the Penobscot River.

=== Construction ===
Construction began in 1844 and continued until all masonry fort funding was withdrawn in 1869, with the fort mostly complete except for the emplacements on the "roof" or barbette level. Funding from Congress was intermittent, and the fort's design was never fully completed despite an expenditure of $1,000,000. Granite was quarried five miles (8 km) upriver from Mount Waldo in Frankfort. The fort's overall design was by Joseph G. Totten, the foremost fortification engineer of the Army Corps of Engineers in his day. Notable engineer officers supervising construction included Isaac Ingalls Stevens and Thomas L. Casey.

Besides the main fort with 64 guns, Fort Knox had two open water batteries facing the river, each equipped with a shot furnace to heat cannonballs sufficiently that they could ignite wooden ships if the ball lodged in the vessel. These furnaces became obsolete with the adoption of ironclad warships.

=== Civil War ===
Fort Knox never saw battle, though it was manned during times of war. During the American Civil War volunteers from Maine, mostly recruits in training before assignment to active duty, manned the fort. Thomas Lincoln Casey supervised work on the fort, including adapting the batteries to use the recently invented Rodman cannon, and oversaw its completion.

=== Spanish–American War ===
A regiment from Connecticut manned Fort Knox during the Spanish–American War. A plaque at the fort describes the laying of a controlled minefield in the river during this war, which Congress appropriated $3,200 for shortly after its outbreak.

=== Post Spanish–American War ===
The garrison was reduced to one man, the "Keeper of the Fort" or caretaker with the rank of ordnance sergeant, at the end of the war. The keeper attended to the condition and maintenance of the fort, and reported to Fort Preble in South Portland. In 1900 the fort received a permanent "torpedo storehouse" for storing naval mines (which were called torpedoes at the time) that is now the Visitor Center.

In 1923, the federal government declared the fort excess property and put its 125-acre (51 ha) grounds up for sale. The state of Maine bought it for $2,121. It has been administered as a Maine state historic site since 1943.

A work crew from the Ellsworth camp of the Civilian Conservation Corps, Co. 193 was deployed to transform the fort into a tourist destination. The November 1936 issue of Brann News, the camp newspaper lists work accomplished: "picnic area, reforestation, road construction, drainage in fort itself, Spring development, table and bench combinations, fireplaces, reconstruction of the retaining wall on the river side of the fort, repairing masonry work, in the interior of the fort."

== Present ==
The fort today is distinguished as one of the best-preserved and most accessible forts in the United States. Virtually all of the fort is open to the public. Several period weapons are on site, including two 15-inch Rodman smoothbores in the water batteries (one remounted), an 8-inch Rodman converted rifle near the parking lot, a 10-inch Rodman smoothbore in the fort, and several 24-pounder flank howitzers. Some of the flank howitzers are mounted on original carriages; "Fort Monroe 1862" can be seen on the bronze plates of these carriages. Remounted 15-inch Rodman guns are rare, as they weigh 50,000 pounds. They were the largest weapon produced in quantity of the Civil War era.

== Friends of Fort Knox ==
The Friends of Fort Knox, a nonprofit group formed in the 1990s, has been responsible for many fort repairs and improvements. Friends of Fort Knox projects include the transformation of the Torpedo Storage Shed into the Visitor and Education Center, restoration of the Officer's Quarters, installation of interpretive panels, repair of Battery A powder magazine, restoration and display of four 24-pound flank defense howitzers, repair and opening of the enlisted men's quarters, cistern, rooms and extensive masonry repair.

The Friends reached an agreement with the State Department of Conservation to take over day-to-day operations of the Fort, and began doing so on April 15, 2012. The State retains ownership of the fort as part of the agreement. The lease runs through 2015 and requires the Friends to be responsible for all maintenance of the grounds as well as the interior and exterior of buildings on the property. The Friends may also improve or alter the fort as long as any changes are consistent with the law.

Beginning in 2012 the Friends were authorized to set the entrance fee to the fort, with the approval of the Bureau of Parks and Lands, with such fees consistent with the goal of keeping entry affordable for Maine residents. In exchange, the Friends keep 85 percent of entrance fee revenue, with the rest going to the State General Fund.

== In the media ==
=== Television ===
Fort Knox was featured as one of the haunted locations on the paranormal TV series Most Terrifying Places in America in an episode titled "Cursed Towns" that aired on the Travel Channel in 2018.

The Travel Channel's television show Destination Fear filmed at the abandoned fort for the third episode of their third season (2021).

== Image gallery ==
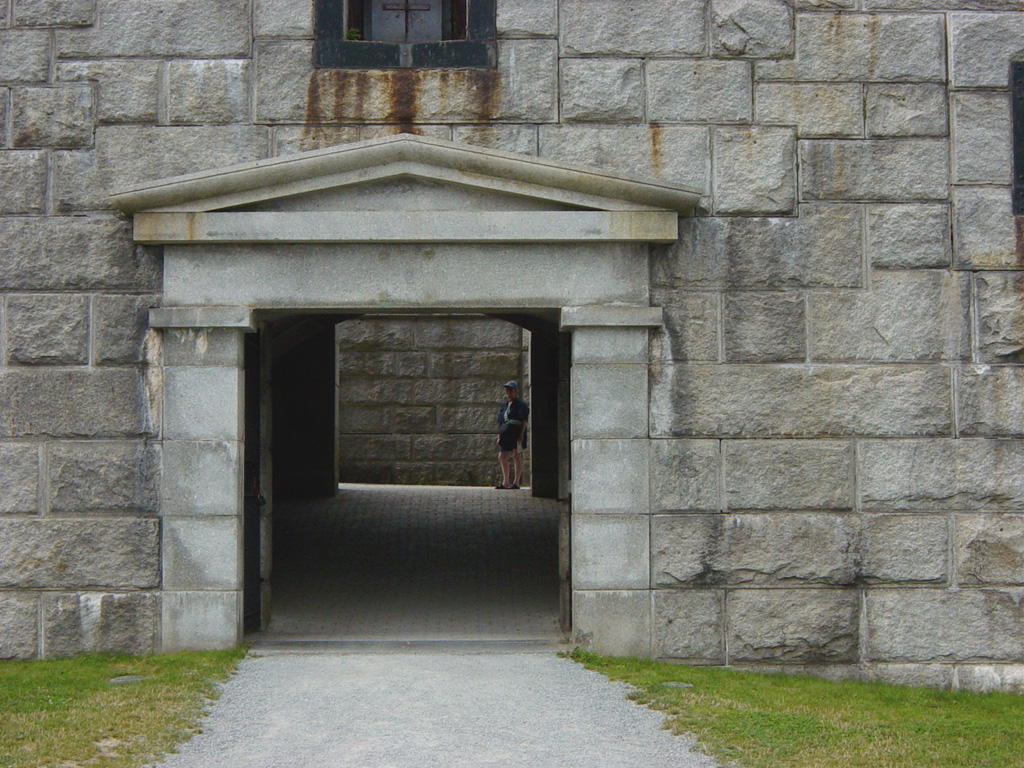
Sally Port-entrance to the fort

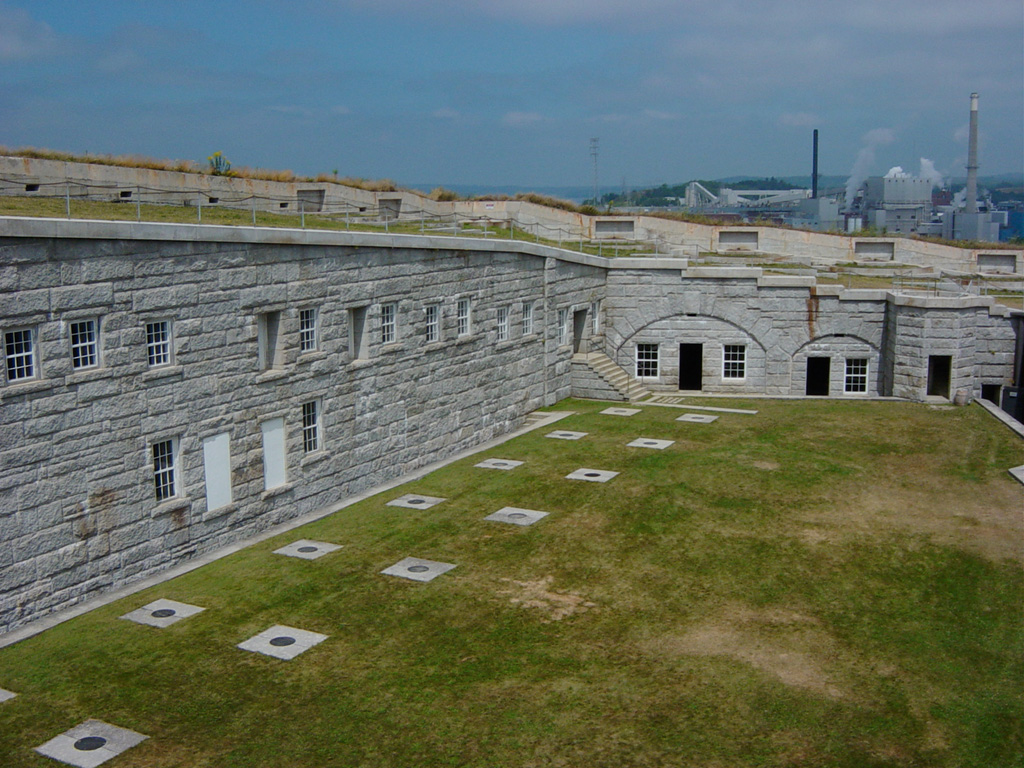
Parade Ground, storage vault covers

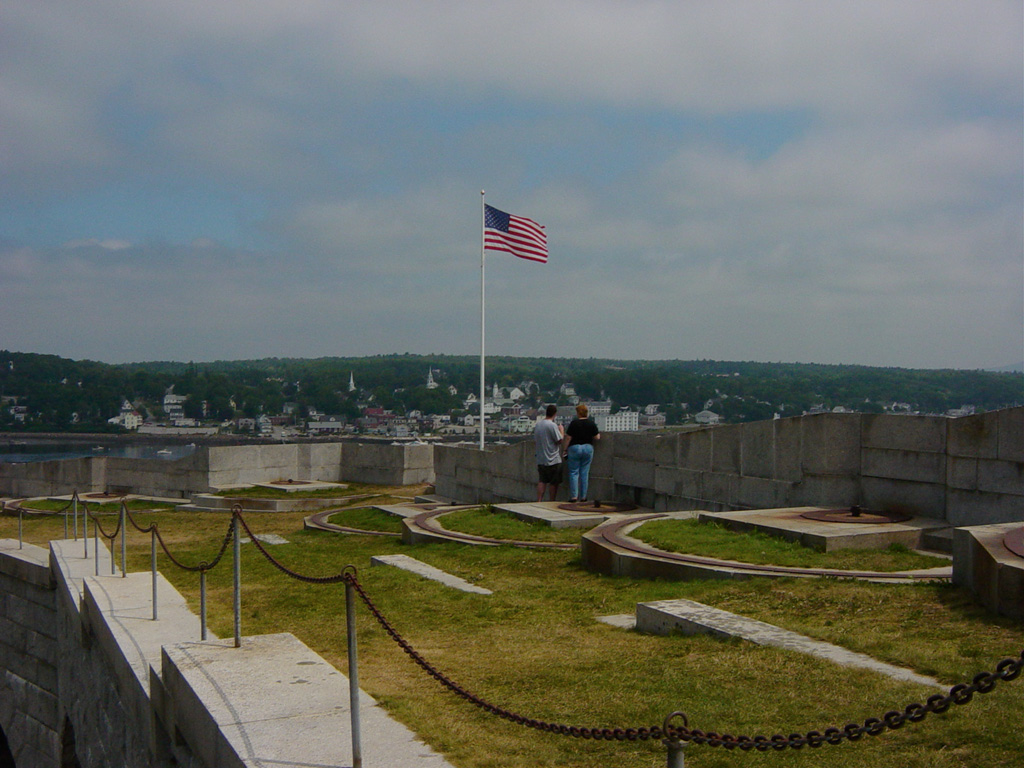
Terreplein - never armed

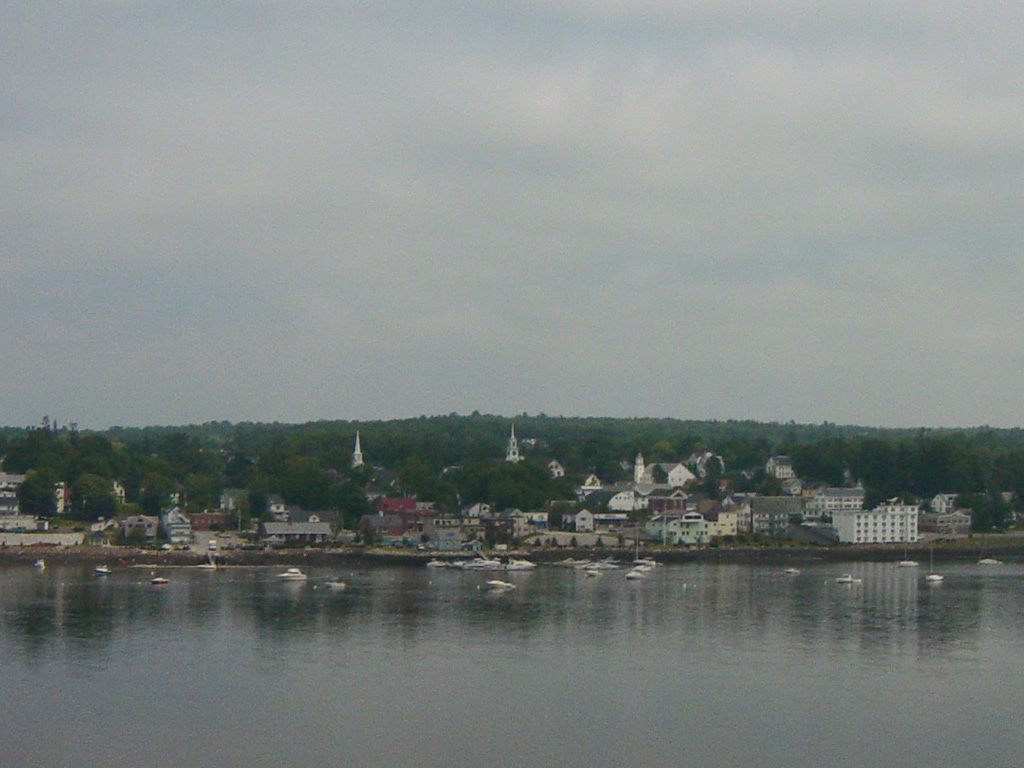
View of Bucksport

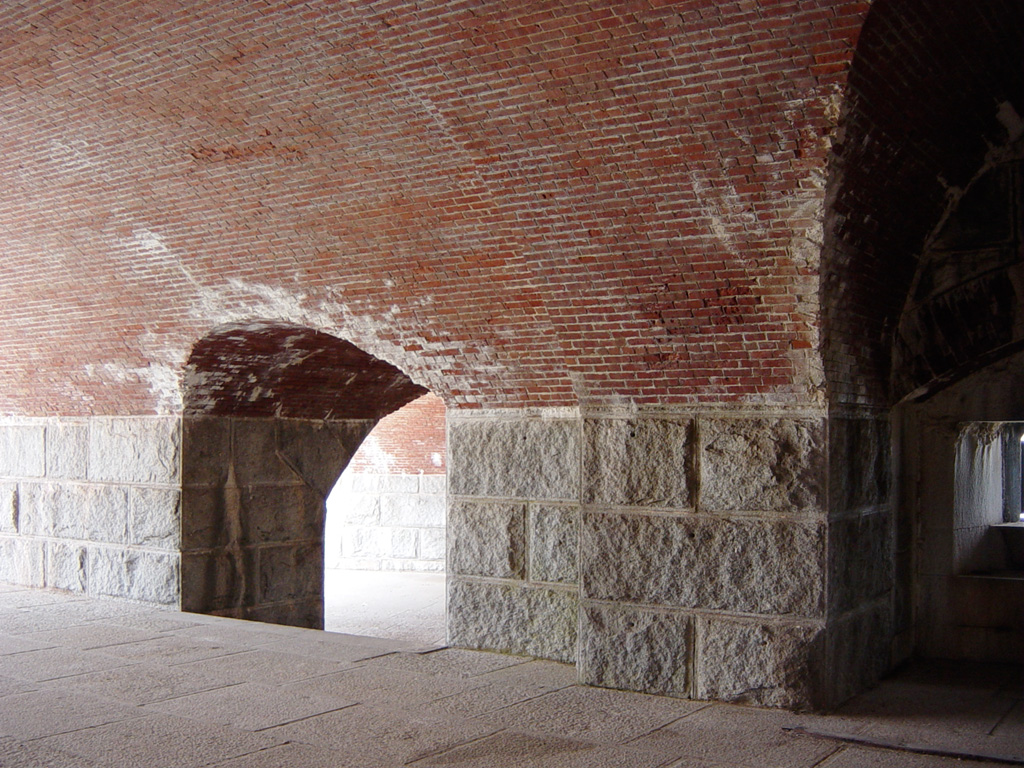
A passage between casemates

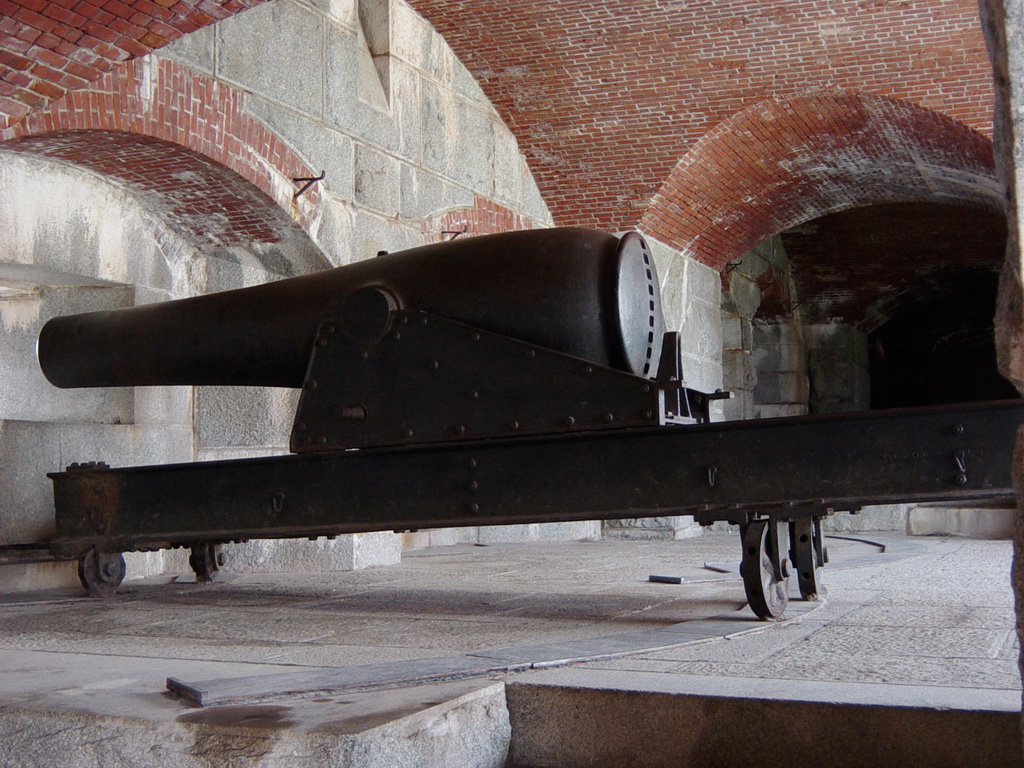
A medium-sized (10 inch) Rodman cannon

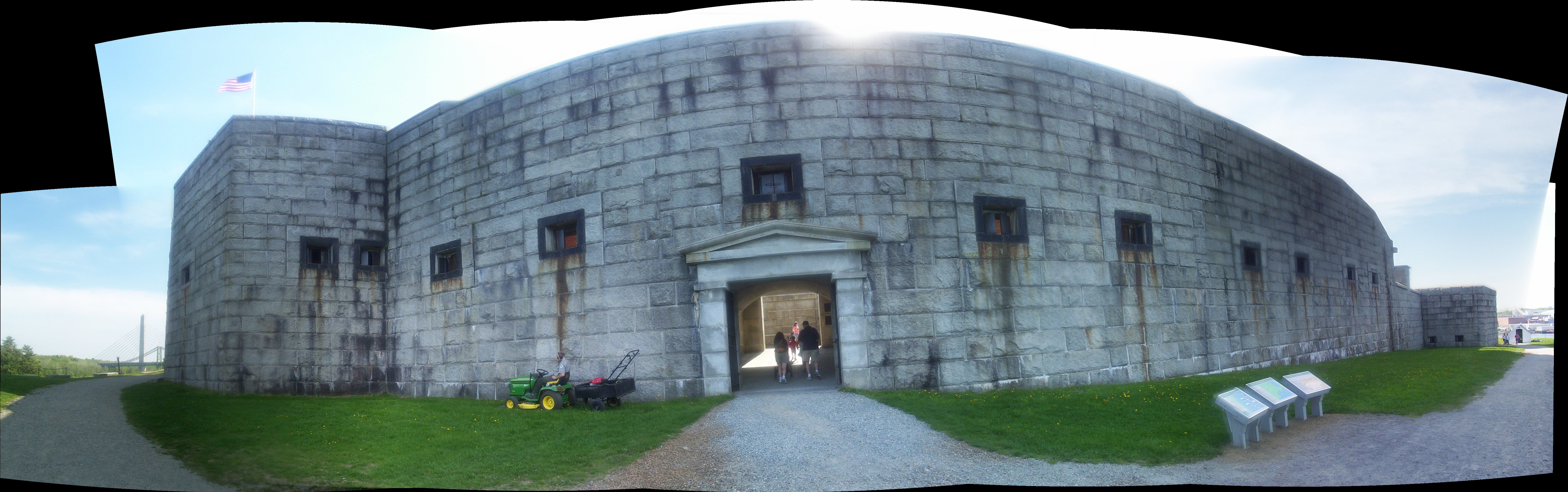
Panorama of the fort entrance

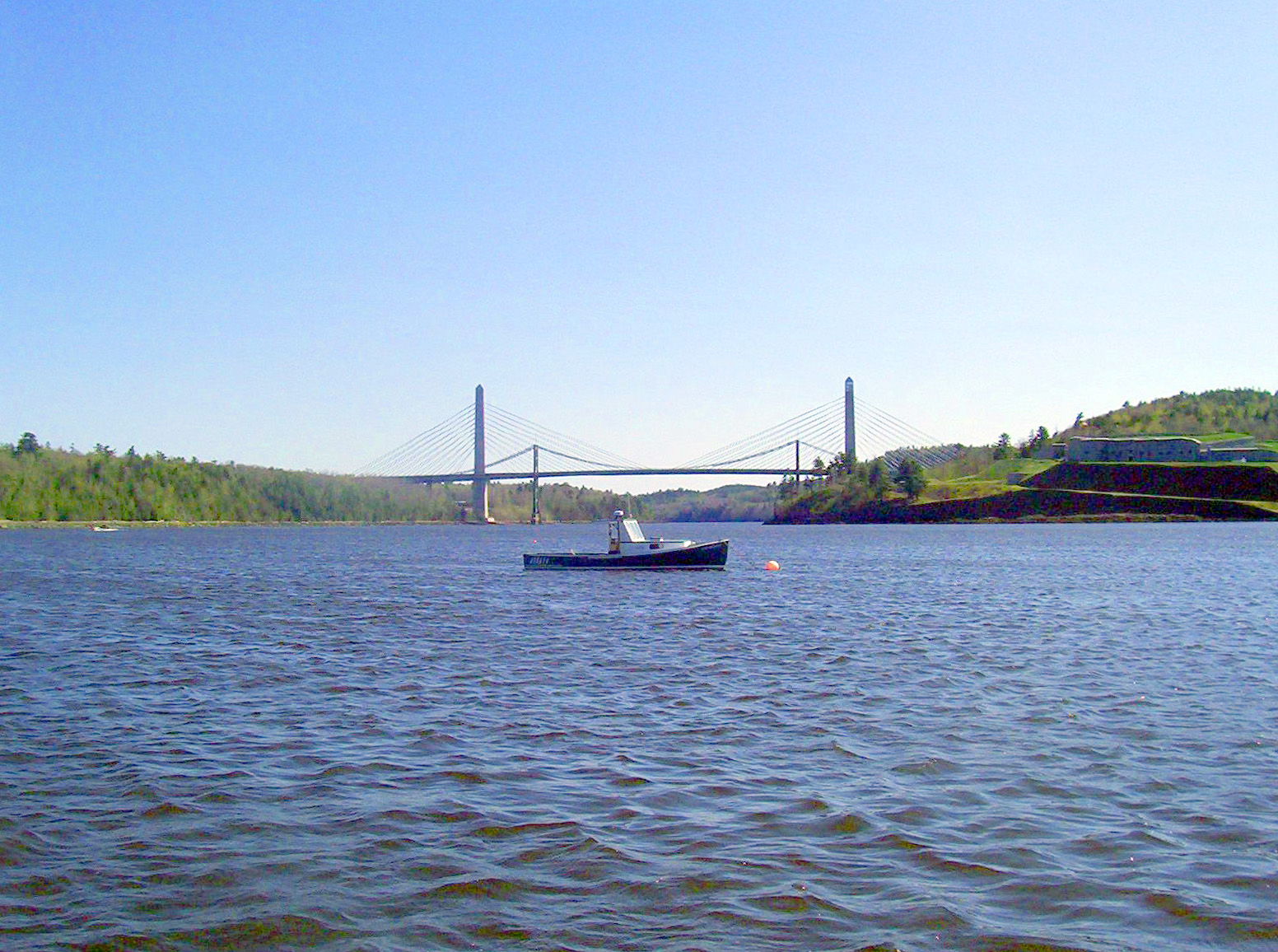
View from Bucksport, Maine waterfront

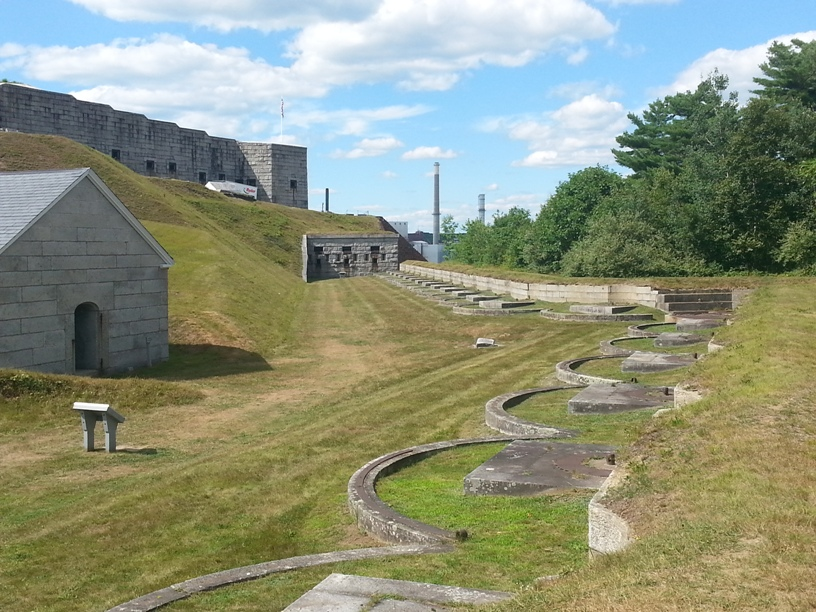
Southern water battery

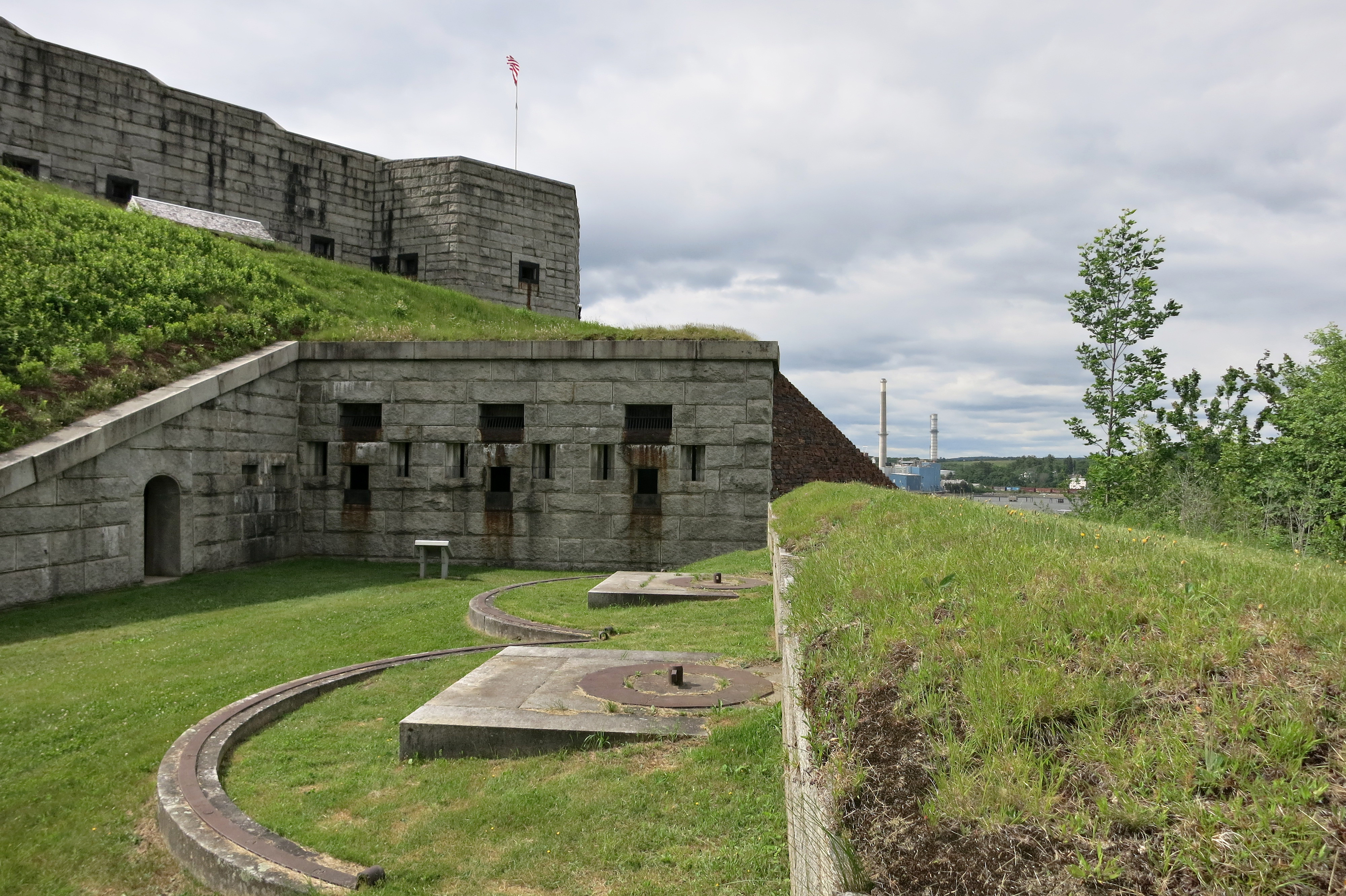
Flank defense, southern water battery

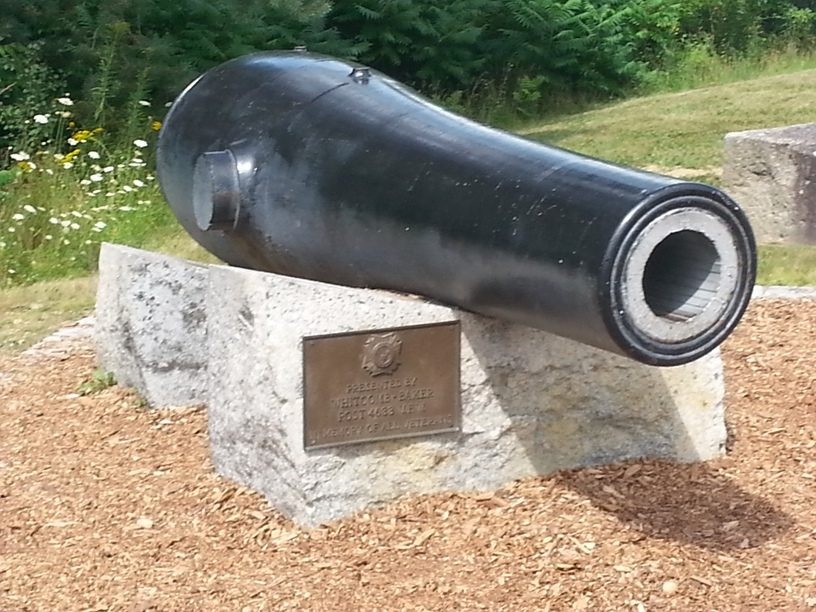
8-inch converted Rodman rifle, lined down from 10-inch smoothbore

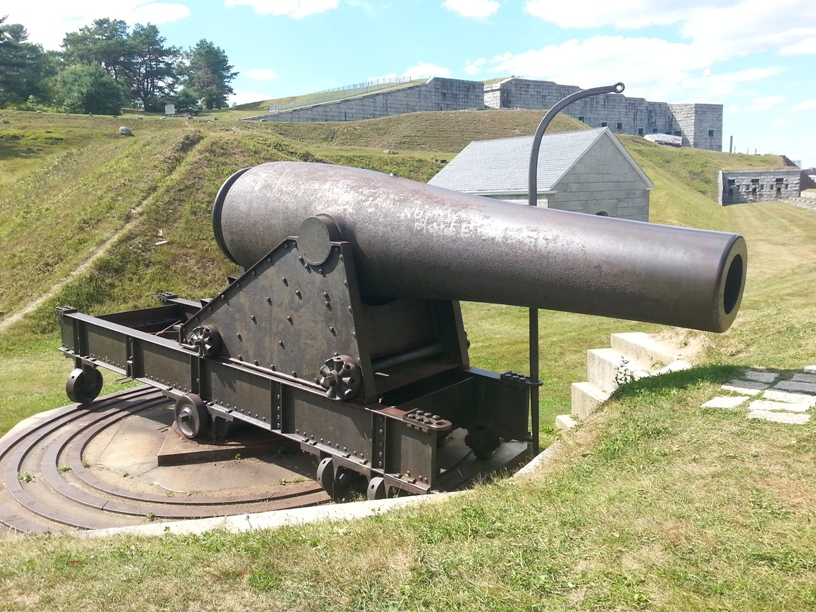
Remounted 15-inch Rodman gun, southern water battery

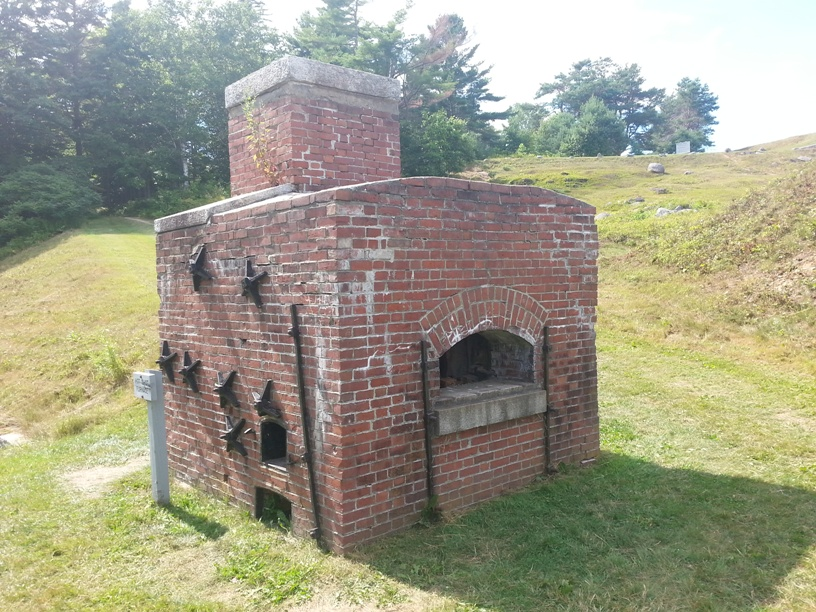
Shot furnace, southern water battery

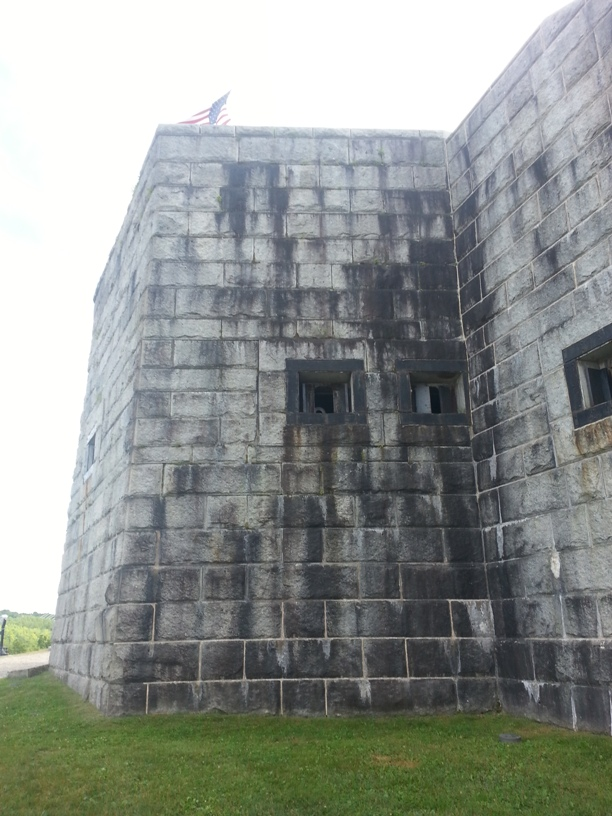
Exterior of bastion

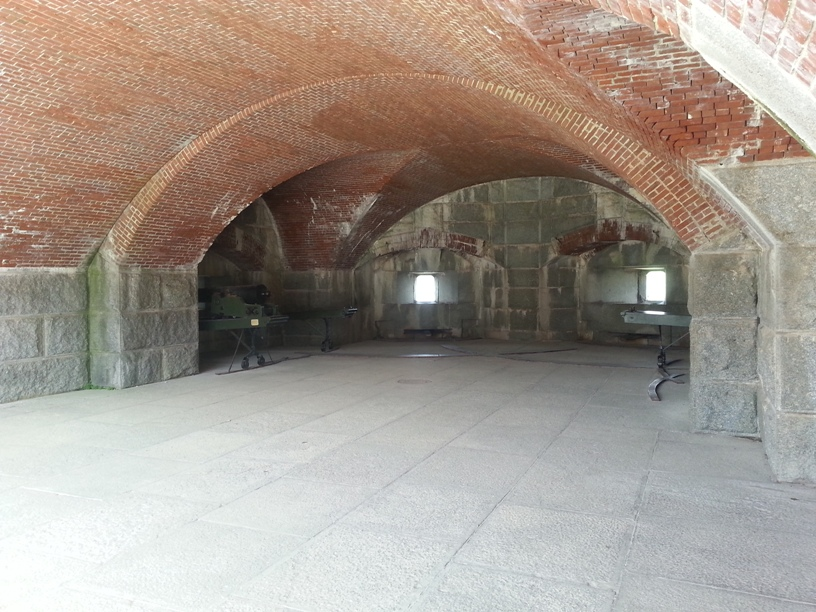
Interior of bastion with 24-pounder flank howitzers on period carriages

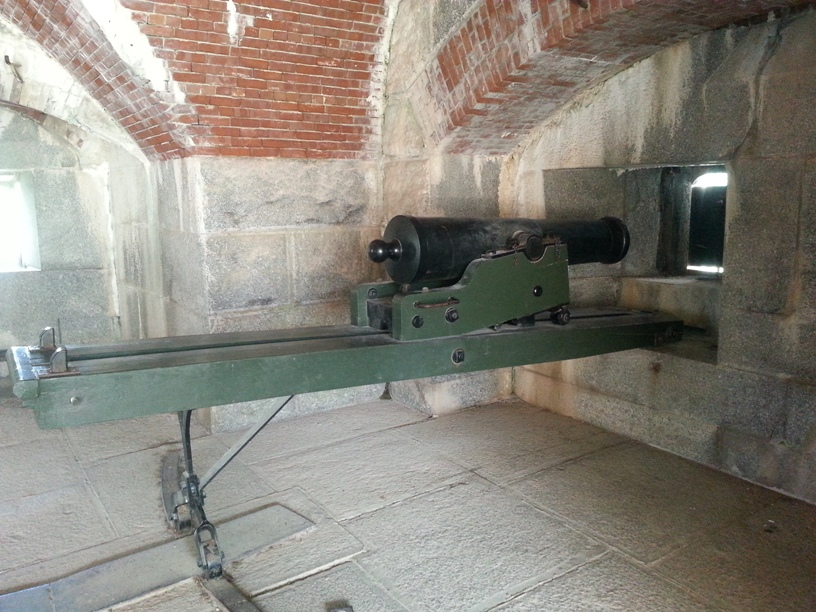
24-pounder flank howitzer in casemate

== See also ==
- National Register of Historic Places listings in Waldo County, Maine
- List of National Historic Landmarks in Maine
- Seacoast defense in the United States
