= Verona Island, Maine =

Town in Maine, United States

- Town
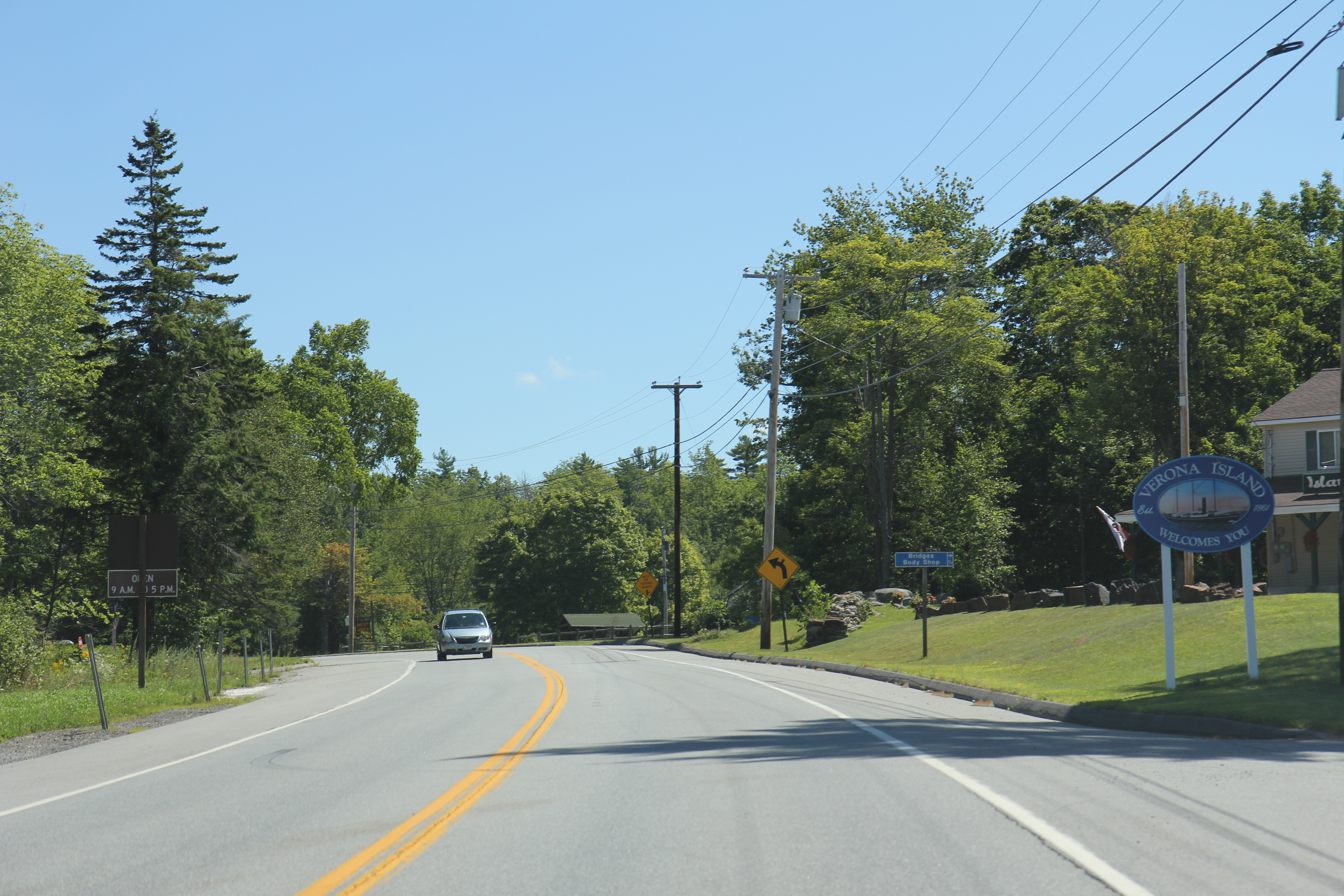
- Sign for Verona Island on US1

- Seal

- Location within Maine Location within the United States
- Coordinates: 44°31′40″N 68°47′06″W
- Country: United States
- State: Maine
- County: Hancock
- Villages: Verona; Verona Park

Area
  - Total: 8.77 sq mi (22.71 km^{2})
  - Land: 6.24 sq mi (16.16 km^{2})
  - Water: 2.53 sq mi (6.55 km^{2})
- Elevation: 102 ft (31 m)

Population (2020)
  - Total: 507
  - Density: 81/sq mi (31.4/km^{2})
- Time zone: UTC-5 (Eastern (EST))
  - Summer (DST): UTC-4 (EDT)
- ZIP Code: 04416
- Area code: 207
- GNIS feature ID: 582780
- Website: www.veroname.org

Verona Island is a town located on an island of the same name in the Penobscot River in Hancock County, Maine, United States. The population was 507 at the 2020 census.

== History ==
The island and community has undergone numerous name changes. It was originally Penobscot Island, part of the Waldo Patent. When Henry Knox bequeathed it to his orphaned grandchildren, it became known as Orphan Island. In 1839 it became the plantation of Wetmore Isle. The name was changed to Verona (after Verona, Italy) upon its incorporation as a town on February 18, 1861. The town lengthened its name to Verona Island, matching the name of the landform on which it was located, in a March 27, 2004 referendum.

The island was once a shipbuilding village. In 1905 the last vessel was built. This was the Roosevelt, which carried Robert Peary from New York to the Arctic in 1908 for his final expedition to the North Pole.

The Waldo–Hancock Bridge (carrying U.S. 1), which opened November 16, 1931, to connect Verona Island and Prospect in Waldo County, is on the National Register of Historic Places but was in such bad condition that it was replaced. Demolition of the bridge began on November 20, 2012.

The new bridge, opened on December 30, 2006, is called the Penobscot Narrows Bridge and Observatory. The legislature's Transportation Committee originally decided it would be named the Downeast Gateway Bridge, but strong opposition by community leaders from eastern Waldo County forced this decision to be reconsidered. The new name was unanimously approved on March 9, 2006, by the committee.

== Geography ==
According to the United States Census Bureau, the town has a total area of 8.77 square miles (22.71 km^{2}), of which 6.24 square miles (16.16 km^{2}) is land and 2.53 square miles (6.55 km^{2}) is water.

The highest point is McCloud Mountain, at an elevation of 344 feet (105 m) above sea level.

== Demographics ==
Historical population
Census	Pop.	Note	%±
1840	139		—
1850	405		191.4%
1860	399		−1.5%
1870	352		−11.8%
1880	356		1.1%
1900	234		—
1910	229		−2.1%
1920	233		1.7%
1930	228		−2.1%
1940	391		71.5%
1950	374		−4.3%
1960	435		16.3%
1970	437		0.5%
1980	559		27.9%
1990	515		−7.9%
2000	533		3.5%
2010	544		2.1%
2020	507		−6.8%
U.S. Decennial Census

=== 2010 census ===
As of the census of 2010, there were 544 people, 238 households, and 164 families living in the town. The population density was 87.2 inhabitants per square mile (33.7/km^{2}). There were 292 housing units at an average density of 46.8 per square mile (18.1/km^{2}). The racial makeup of the town was 97.4% White, 0.2% Native American, and 2.4% from two or more races. Hispanic or Latino of any race were 0.4% of the population.

There were 238 households, of which 26.1% had children under the age of 18 living with them, 55.5% were married couples living together, 8.8% had a female householder with no husband present, 4.6% had a male householder with no wife present, and 31.1% were non-families. 25.6% of all households were made up of individuals, and 8.4% had someone living alone who was 65 years of age or older. The average household size was 2.29 and the average family size was 2.66.

The median age in the town was 47.3 years. 17.5% of residents were under the age of 18; 7% were between the ages of 18 and 24; 21.4% were from 25 to 44; 36.8% were from 45 to 64; and 17.5% were 65 years of age or older. The gender makeup of the town was 49.6% male and 50.4% female.

=== 2000 census ===
As of the census of 2000, there were 533 people, 223 households, and 161 families living in the town. The population density was 85.6 inhabitants per square mile (33.1/km^{2}). There were 262 housing units at an average density of 42.1 per square mile (16.3/km^{2}). The racial makeup of the town was 98.69% White, 0.19% from other races, and 1.13% from two or more races. Hispanic or Latino of any race were 0.19% of the population.

There were 223 households, out of which 24.7% had children under the age of 18 living with them, 62.8% were married couples living together, 6.7% had a female householder with no husband present, and 27.4% were non-families. 21.5% of all households were made up of individuals, and 11.2% had someone living alone who was 65 years of age or older. The average household size was 2.39 and the average family size was 2.78.

In the town, the population was spread out, with 19.5% under the age of 18, 6.8% from 18 to 24, 25.1% from 25 to 44, 30.6% from 45 to 64, and 18.0% who were 65 years of age or older. The median age was 44 years. For every 100 females, there were 94.5 males. For every 100 females age 18 and over, there were 88.2 males.

The median income for a household in the town was $41,827, and the median income for a family was $47,778. Males had a median income of $35,125 versus $31,563 for females. The per capita income for the town was $20,714. About 5.7% of families and 6.5% of the population were below the poverty line, including 2.1% of those under age 18 and 10.6% of those age 65 or over.

== See also ==
- List of islands of Maine
