= Penobscot Narrows Bridge and Observatory =

Penobscot Narrows Bridge
- The Penobscot Narrows Bridge. Observatory is at top of west tower; access is provided via elevator from west tower base.
- Coordinates: 44°33′32″N 68°48′11″W
- Carries: 2 lanes of US 1 / SR 3
- Crosses: Penobscot River
- Locale: Prospect – Verona Island, Maine
- Official name: Penobscot Narrows Bridge and Observatory
- Maintained by: Maine Department of Transportation

Characteristics
- Design: Cable-stayed bridge
- Total length: 2,120 feet (646 m)
- Height: 447 feet (136 m)
- Longest span: 1,161 feet (354 m)
- Clearance below: 135 feet (41 m)

History
- Opened: December 30, 2006

Location
- Interactive map of Penobscot Narrows Bridge

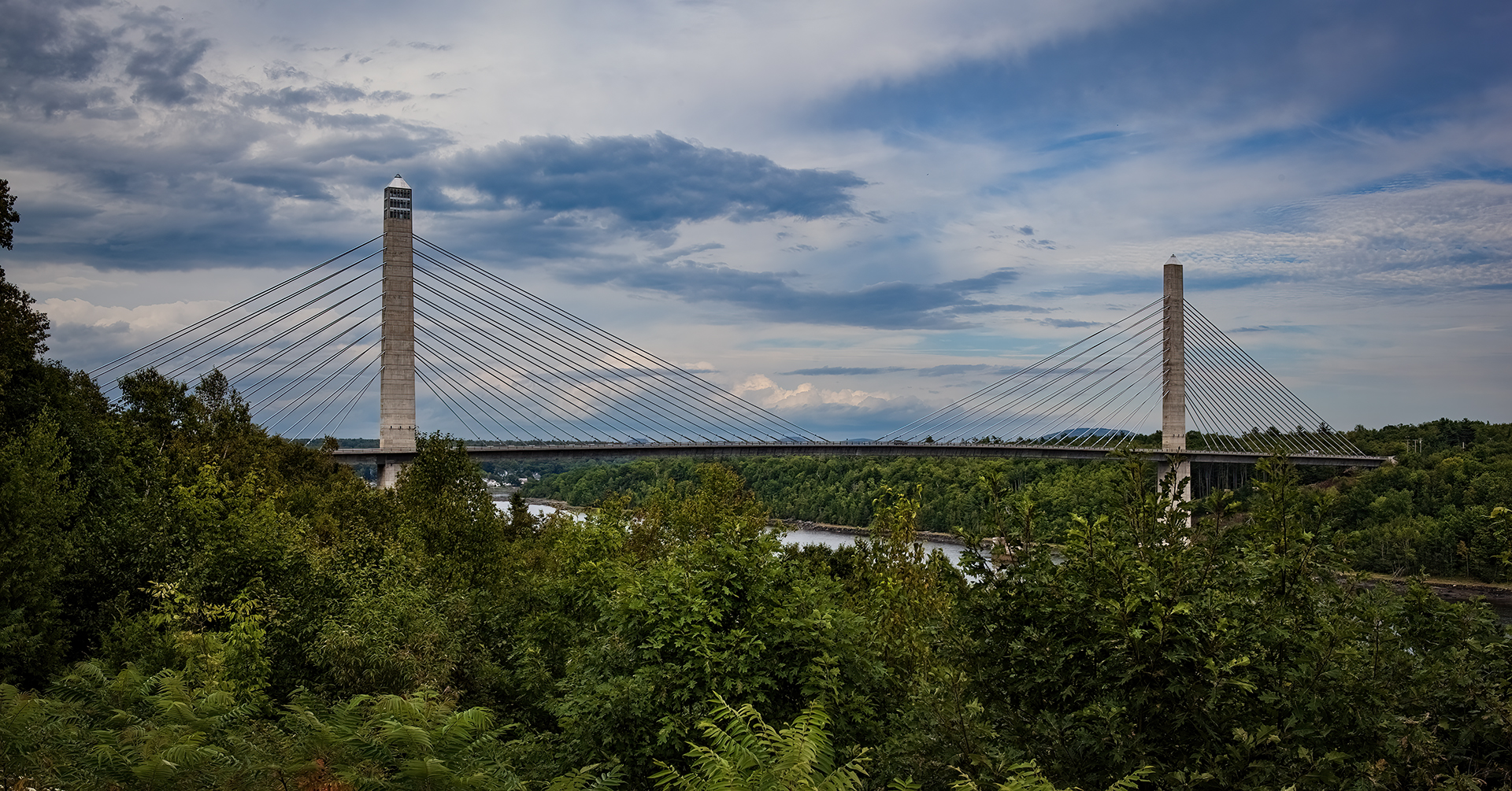
Wide view of the Penobscot Narrows Bridge as seen from the south. August 2014

The Penobscot Narrows Bridge is a 2,120-foot-long (650 m) cable-stayed bridge that carries US 1/SR 3 over the Penobscot River. It connects Verona Island to Prospect, in the U.S. state of Maine. It opened in December 2006, replacing the Waldo–Hancock Bridge, built in 1931.

== Technical information ==
The Penobscot Narrows Bridge is one of three bridges in the US (the others being the Zakim Bridge in Boston, Massachusetts, and the Veterans' Glass City Skyway in Toledo, Ohio) constructed in the 2000s using a cradle system that carries the strands within the stays from bridge deck to bridge deck, as a continuous element, eliminating anchorages in the pylons. Each epoxy-coated steel strand is carried inside the cradle in a one-inch steel tube. Each strand acts independently, allowing for removal, inspection and replacement of individual strands. The cable-stay system was designed with a system that uses pressurized nitrogen gas to defend against corrosion.

In June 2007, six reference strands within three stays were replaced with carbon fiber strands — a first in the United States. Monitoring on the strands will evaluate this material for future use in bridge designs. These engineering innovations helped the bridge appear in the December 2006 edition of Popular Science as one of the 100 best innovations of the year. The total project cost was $85 million.

The bridge was designed as an emergency replacement for the Waldo–Hancock Bridge. Just 42 months elapsed from conception to completion. A unique project delivery method, referred to as "owner facilitated design/build", partnered Maine DOT with FIGG as the designer and Cianbro/Reed & Reed LLC as the contractor. The elevator system in the tower, which is claimed to be the fastest and tallest elevator in Maine, was installed by Stanley Elevator Company, Inc.

== Observation tower ==
The Penobscot Bridge site is home to the Penobscot Narrows Observatory, the first bridge observation tower in the United States and the tallest public bridge observatory in the world. It is located in the 420-foot (128 m) west tower, allowing visitors to view the bridge, the nearby Fort Knox State Historic Site, the Penobscot River, and Penobscot Bay.

The Penobscot Narrows Observatory opened to the general public on May 19, 2007. It is open at the same times of the year as Fort Knox (May 1 to October 31).

The elevator has had a series of technical problems, including one on July 1, 2014, when 13 people were temporarily stuck in the observatory due to the elevator doors not opening.

== Suicides ==
The bridge has been the site of at least fourteen suicides since its opening; more are suspected. This included the Rev. Robert Carlson, a well-known figure in the Bangor area, who was found in the Penobscot River beneath the bridge on November 13, 2011. Other suicidal people have been talked down from the bridge before they jumped. Before the bridge opened, MaineDOT was aware of many suicide attempts from the Waldo-Hancock Bridge and discussed possible pedestrian safety measures for the new bridge, but no special fencing or other action was taken.

On February 26, 2014, in the wake of another suicide from the bridge, independent Rep. Joe Brooks of Winterport proposed emergency legislation to the Maine Legislature to require the installation of a suicide barrier on the bridge. This proposal was rejected due to cost, as a barrier was estimated to cost between $500,000 and $1 million, plus additional costs for regular inspections. As an alternative, two solar-powered phones were installed on each end of the bridge in May 2015 which connect users to a suicide hotline. The phones cost $30,000. State officials were aware of instances the phones were not functional, and increased inspections of them to weekly from the previous monthly. They could not determine if the phones were functional when a March 5, 2017 suicide, the first since the phones were installed, occurred. The phones were found to be out of order on June 23, 2017, when an abandoned car on the bridge resulted in a search of the Penobscot River by authorities looking for its driver. The emergency phones on the Penobscot Narrows Bridge were reported out of order following another suicide in 2021. They were subsequently replaced. In May 2022, the Maine legislature was reportedly planning to "pull together a study group on suicides by bridge." Funding was subsequently approved for a barrier, but the installation slated for 2024 was delayed for further testing.

== Closures ==
The bridge was closed for the first time on December 29, 2013, after ice chunks began falling from the support cables onto the bridge deck. The ice was present from a storm on December 22, but did not fall off until the 29th due to cold weather. Hancock County Sheriff's Deputies began receiving reports of damaged cars that morning and upon inspection recommended to MaineDOT that the bridge be closed. At least five vehicles were damaged and two destroyed by the ice. While MaineDOT estimated that 70% of the ice had fallen by that afternoon, it was feared that reopening the bridge would shake more ice onto the bridge deck. MaineDOT also ruled out sending crews onto the bridge cables to remove the ice as too dangerous, but by the following day they were considering bringing in heavy equipment to knock ice off the cables. The bridge reopened on December 30, 2013, after being closed just one day but closed again January 5, 2014, for at least another day, "in anticipation that the ice would melt as temperatures moderated for the first time in days."

The bridge was briefly closed on December 7, 2017, when a woman armed with a shotgun was seen walking across the bridge from the Prospect side to the Verona Island side and then sat on the deck. After closing the bridge, Maine State Police officers negotiated with the woman by loudspeaker, and she surrendered after approximately 20 minutes.

== Gallery ==
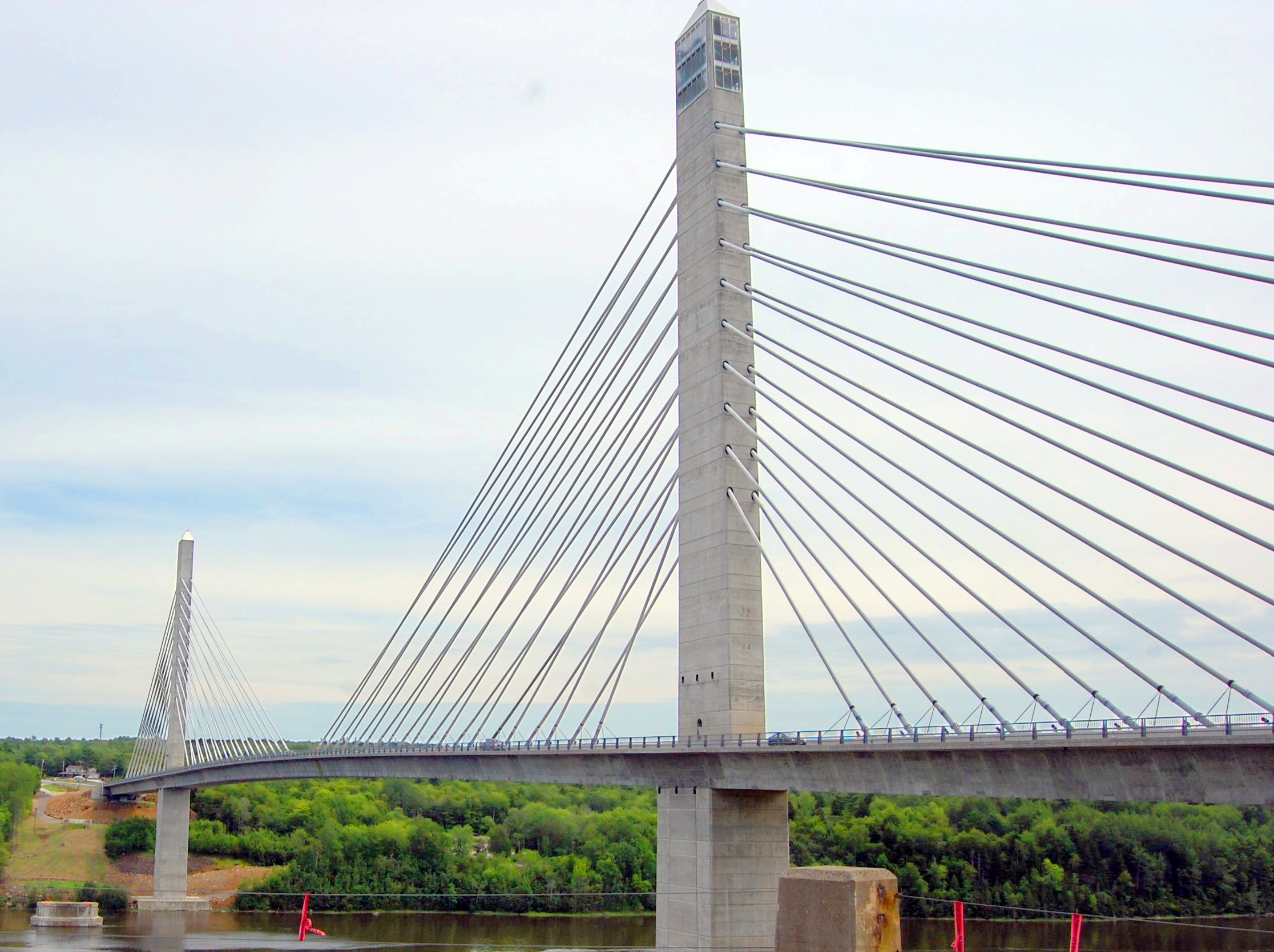
Bridge as seen from the west in 2013

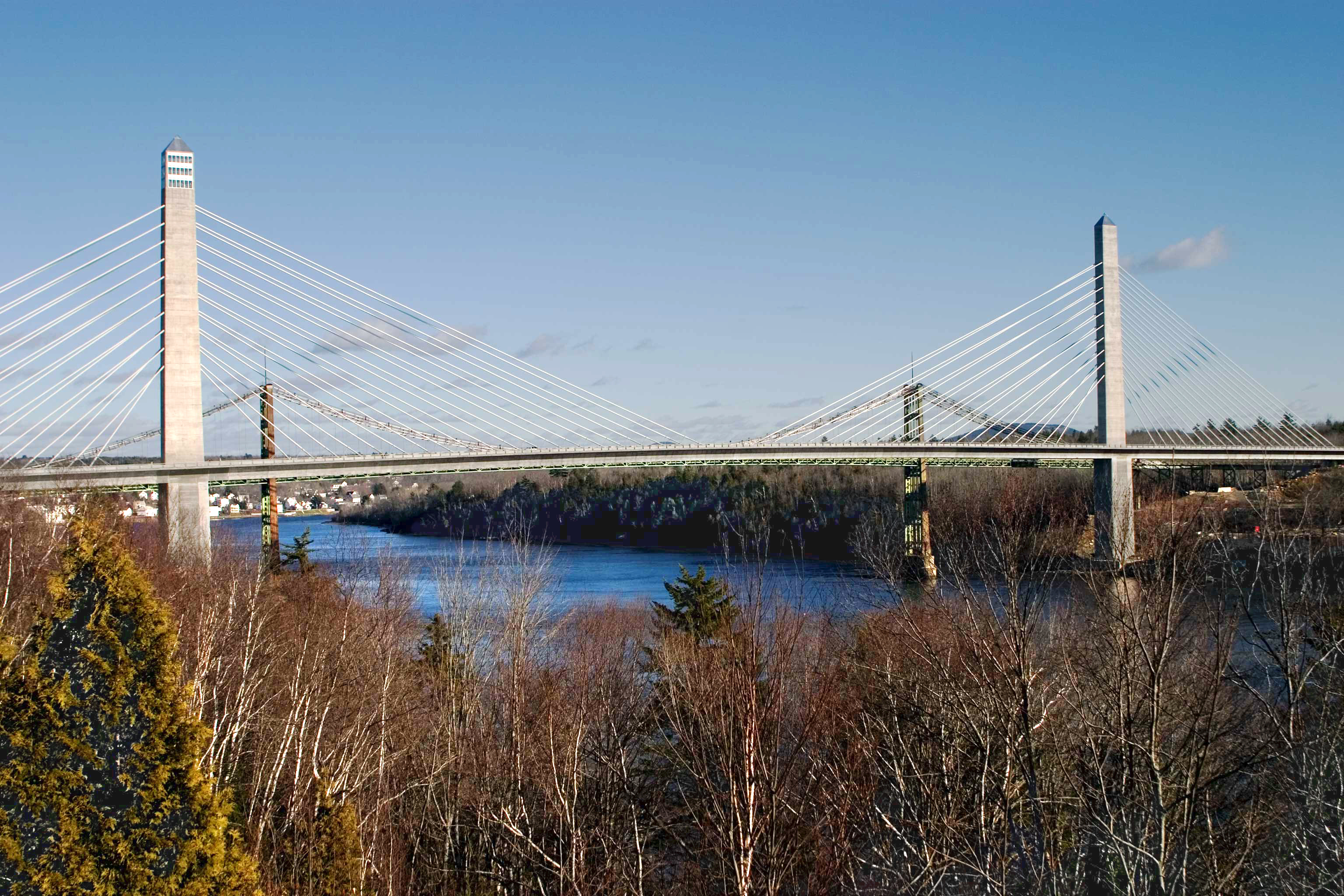
Bridge with the old Waldo-Hancock Bridge

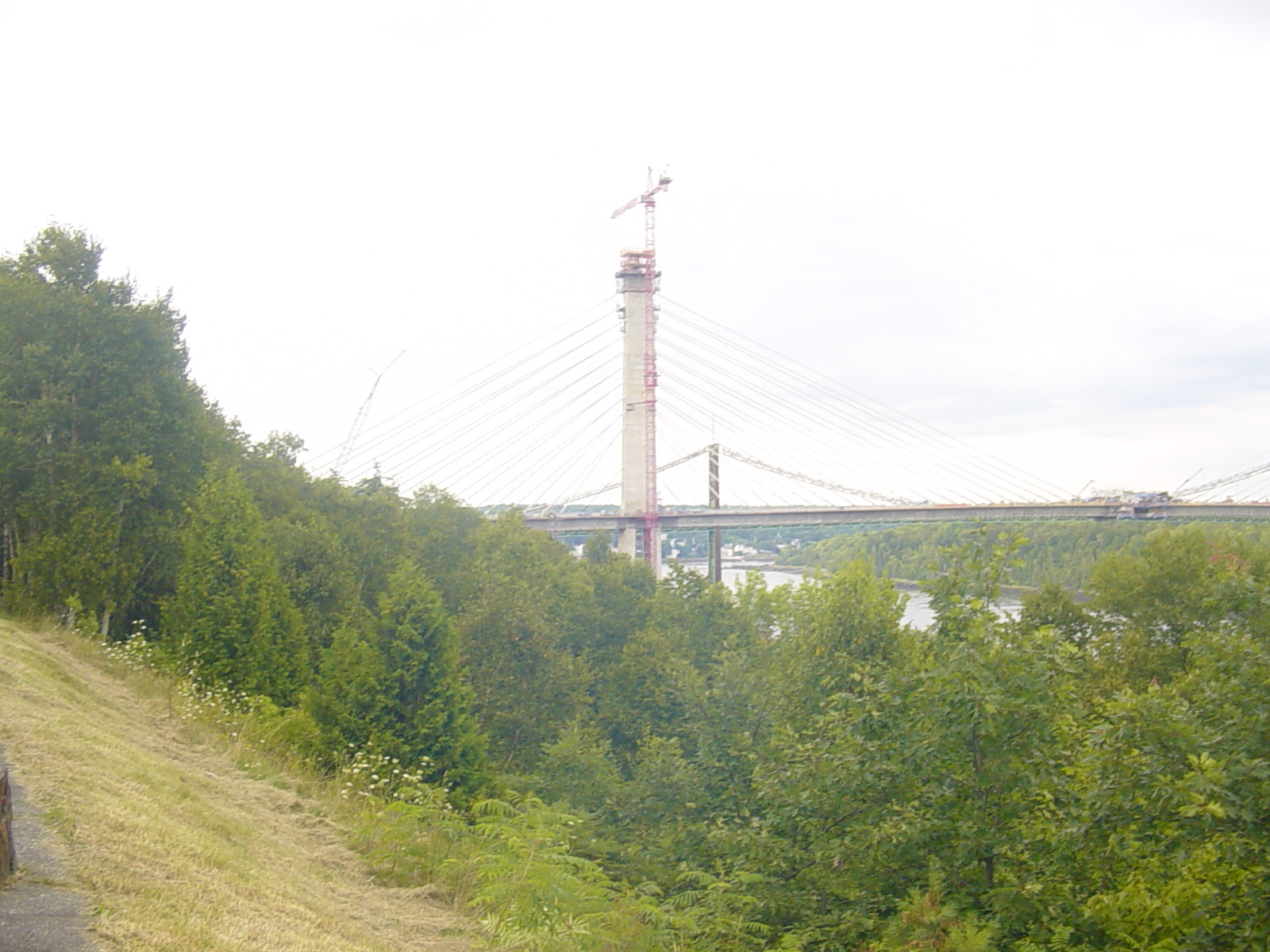
Penobscot Bridge, August 2006

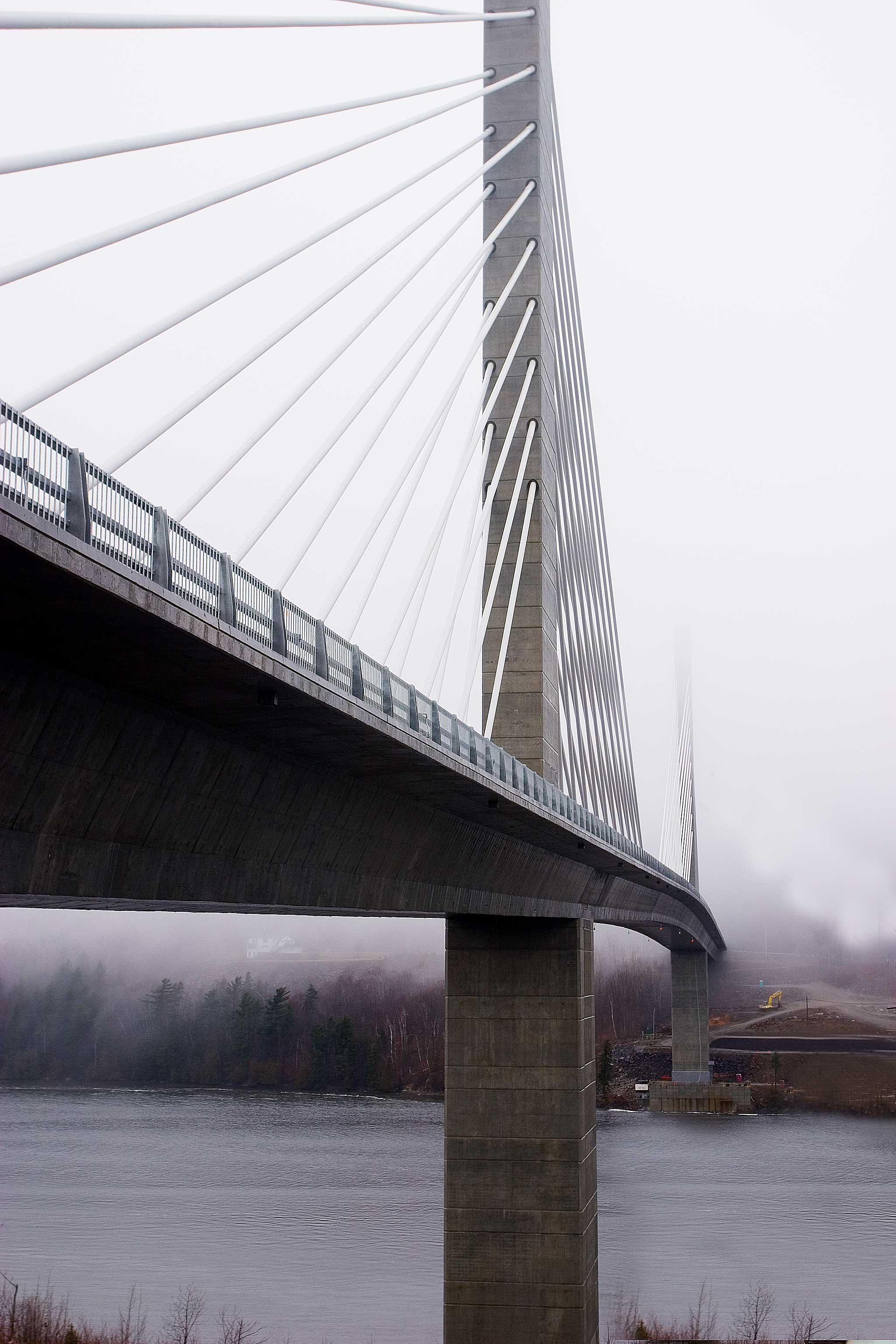
Viewed from Verona Island

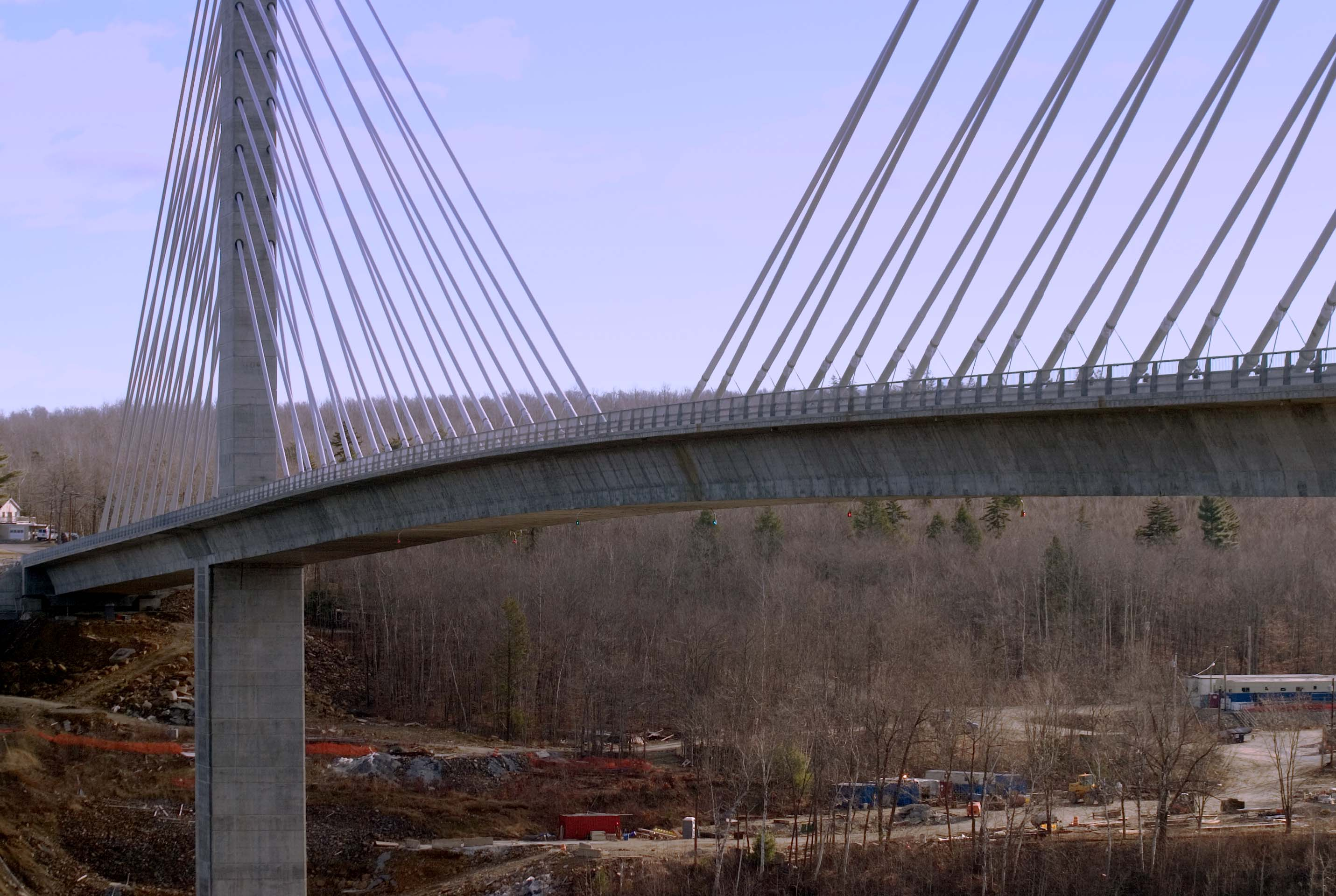
Viewed from north toward the southeast

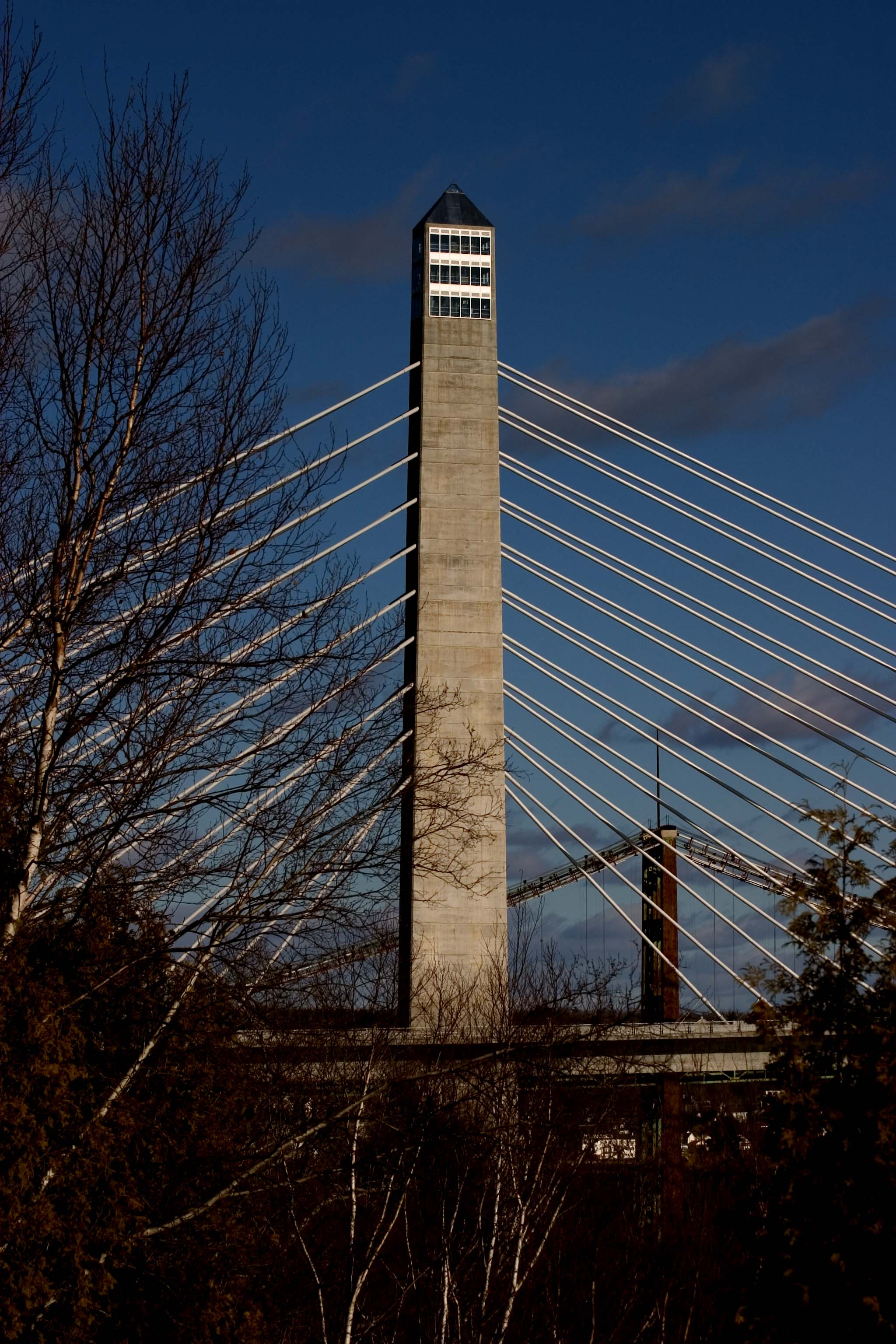
Viewed from scenic overlook of the western pylon

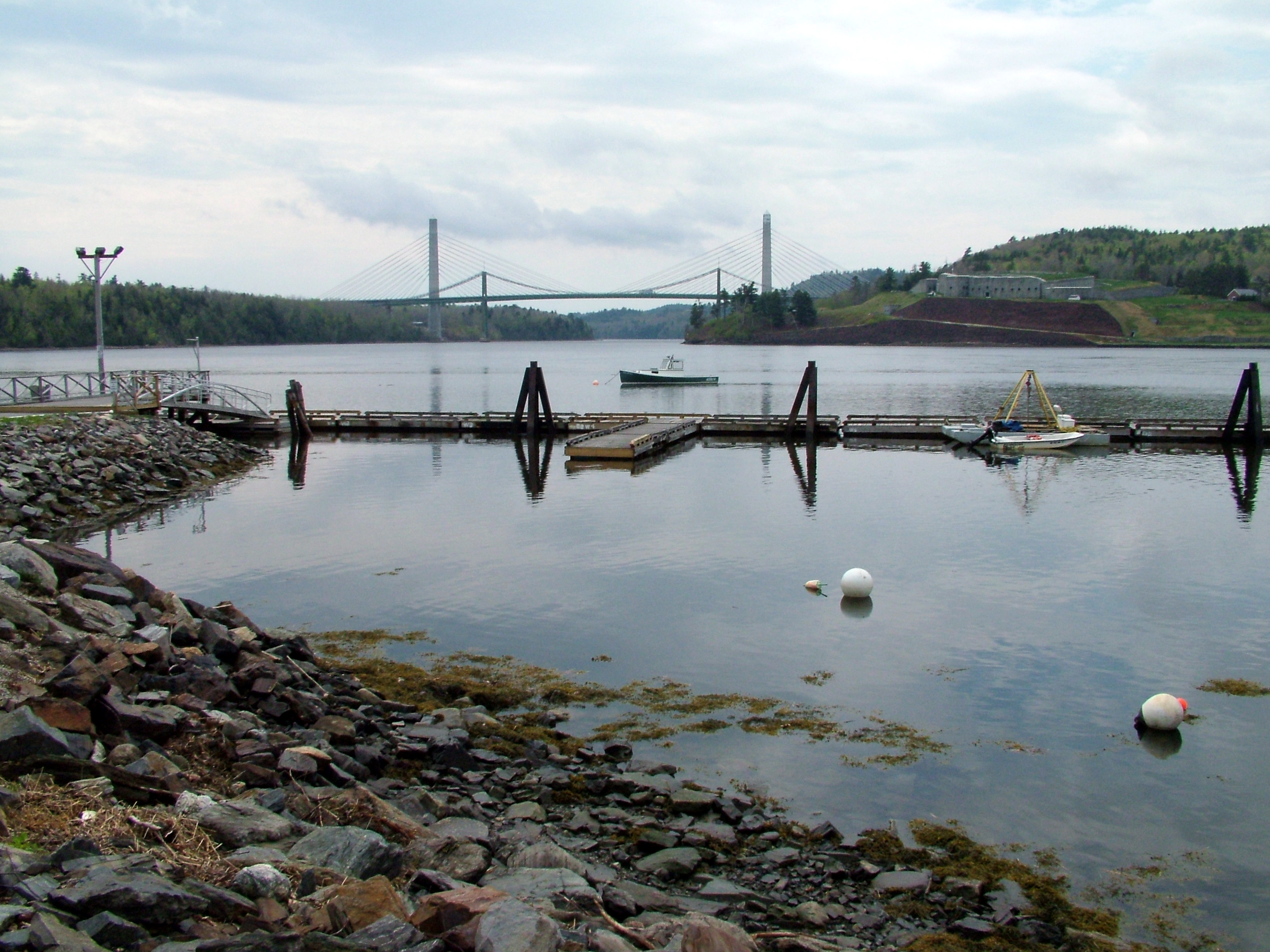
View from Bucksport

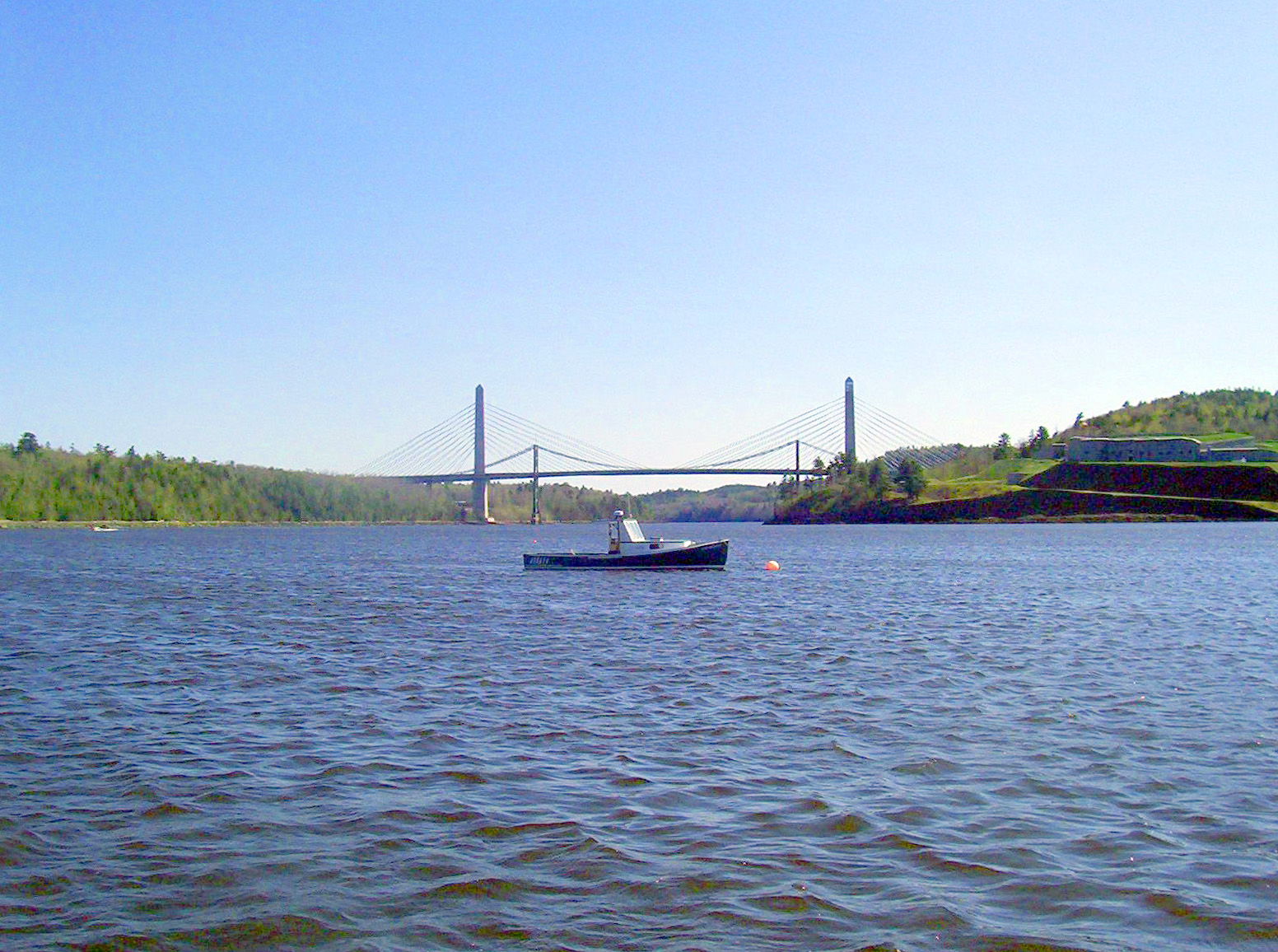
Another view from Bucksport

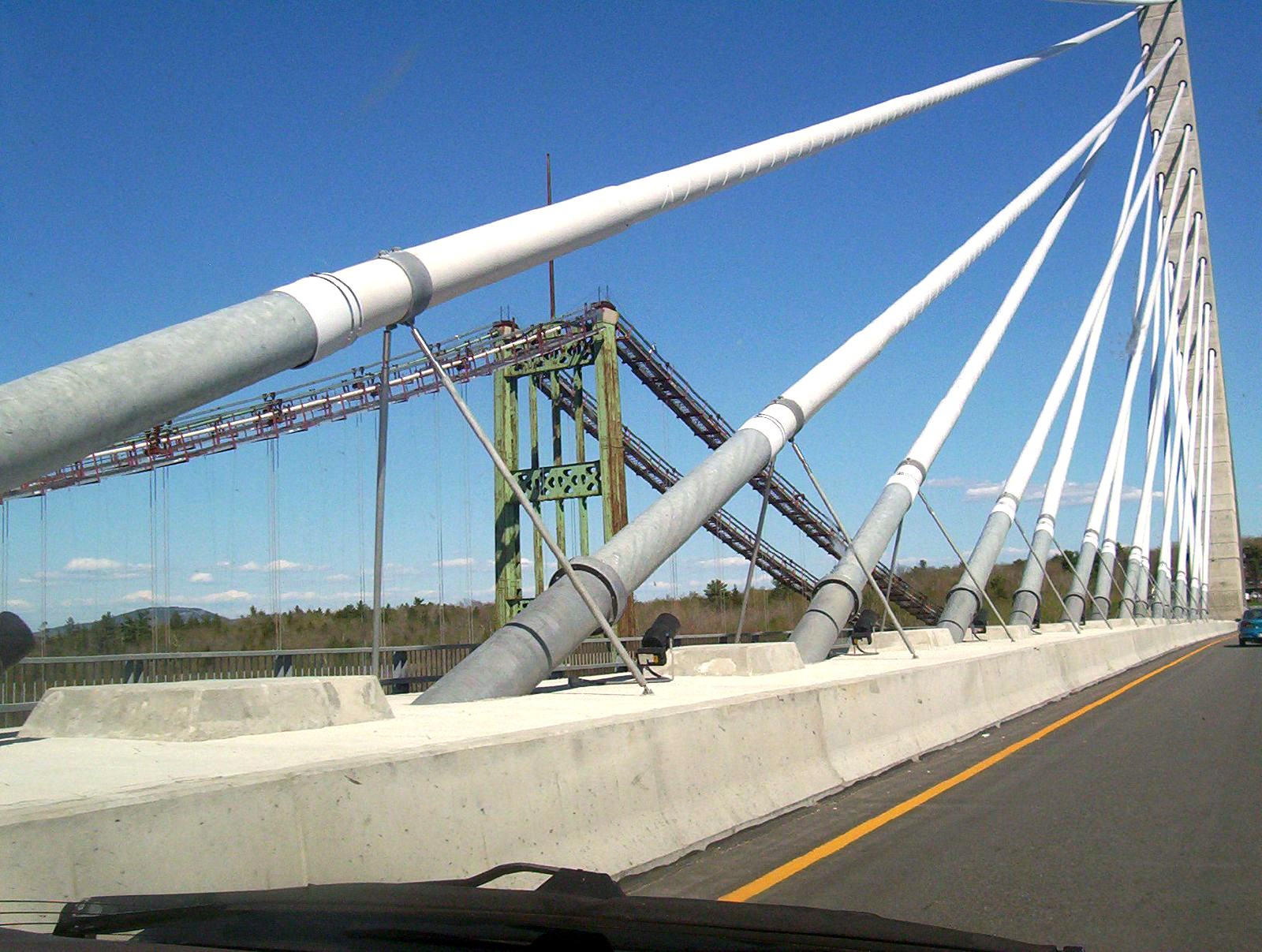
Closeup while riding across

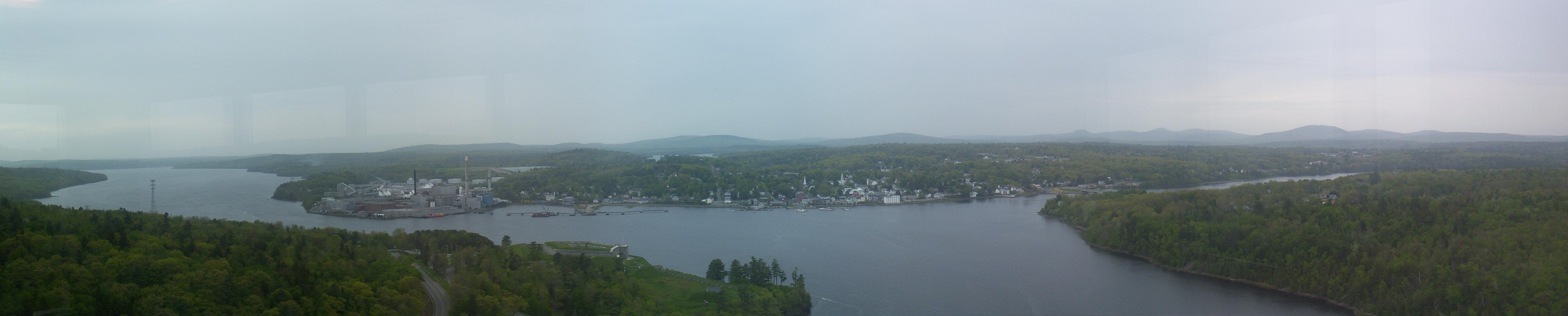
View from Observatory facing roughly northeast

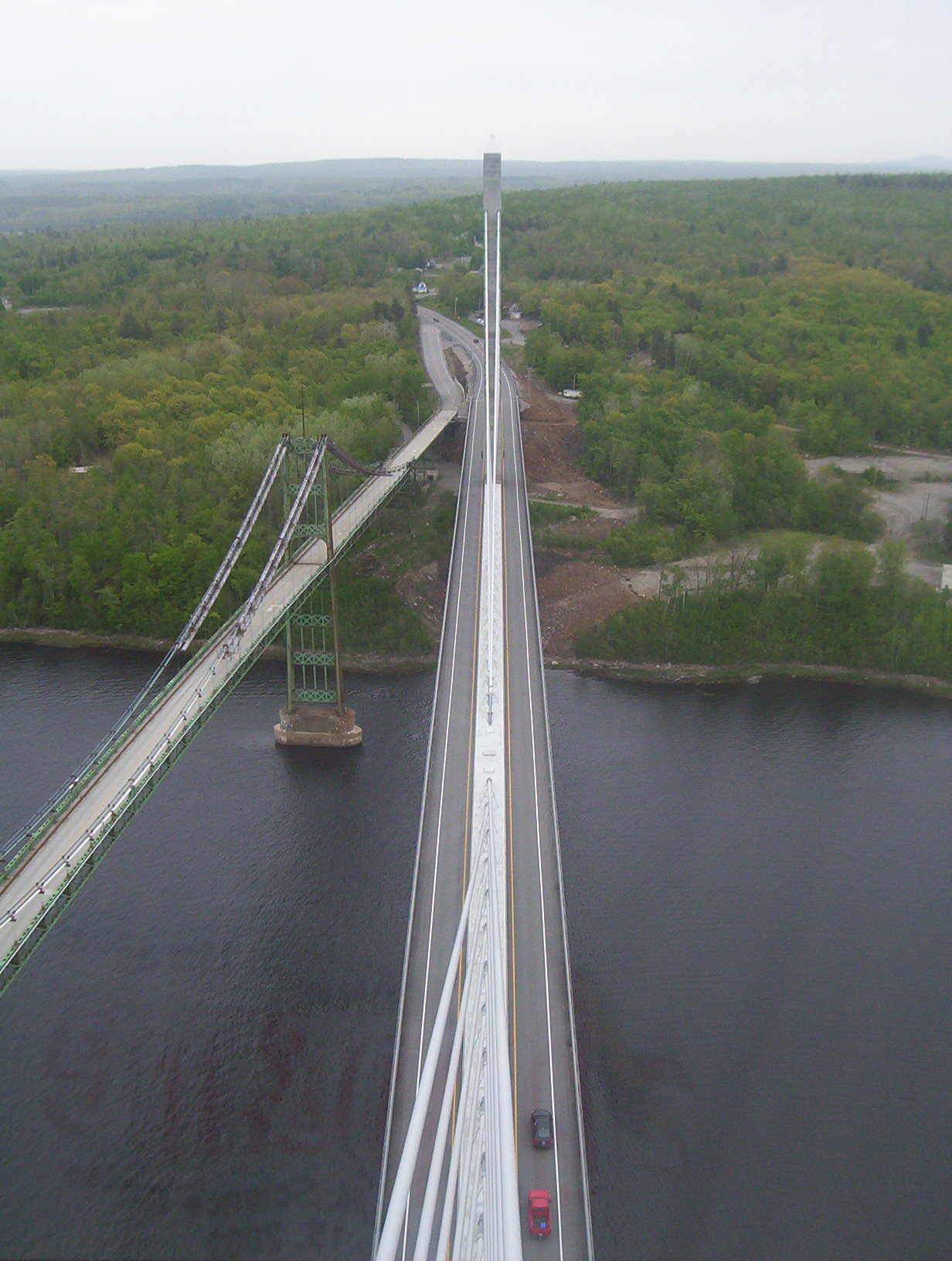
Bridge from top of west tower

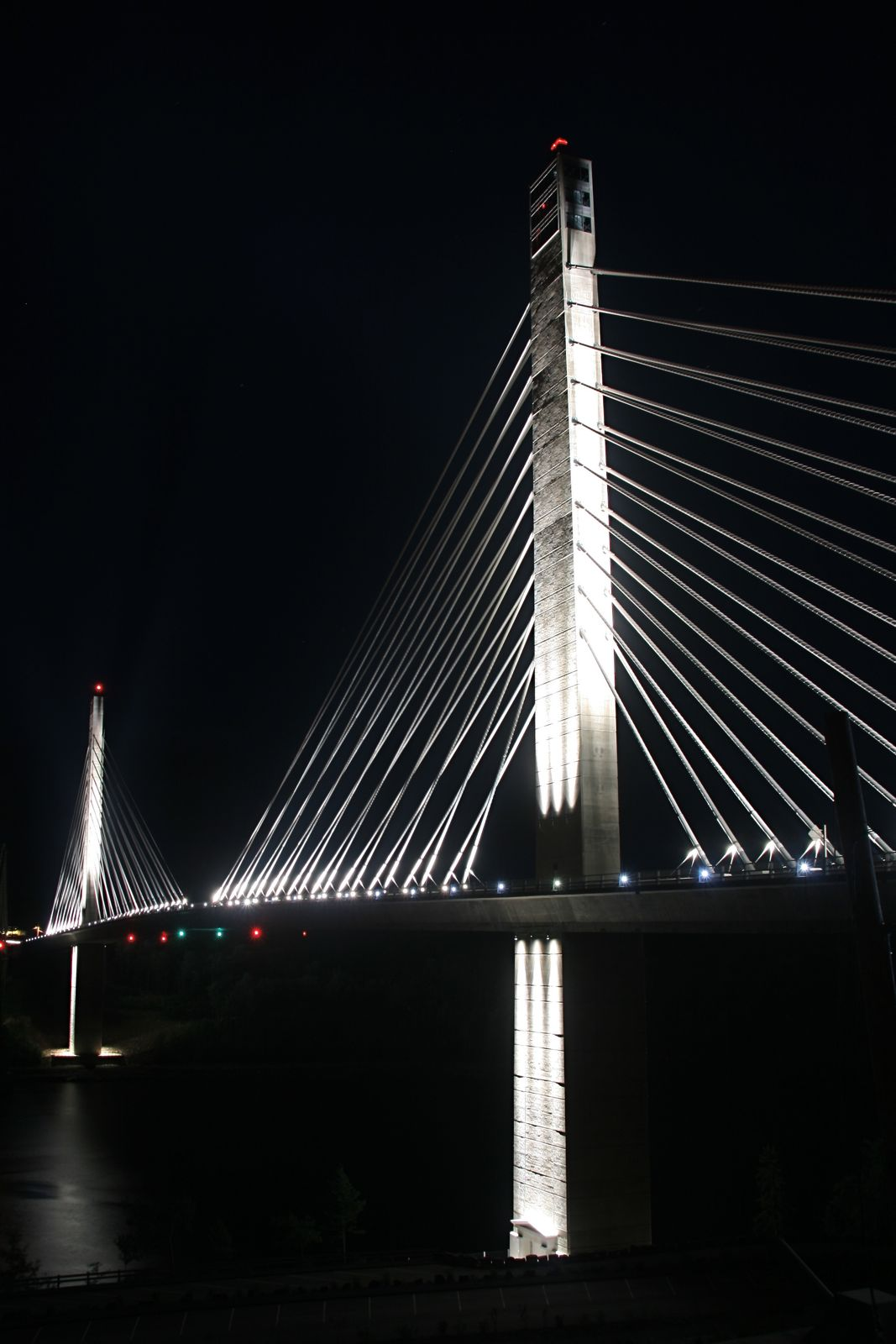
Bridge illuminated at night

The Waldo-Hancock Bridge (1931-2006) that the Penobscot Narrows Bridge replaced
