= Waldo–Hancock Bridge =

- Waldo–Hancock Bridge in 2001
- Coordinates: 44.560692°N 68.801966°W
- Carries: US 1 and SR 3
- Crosses: Penobscot River
- Locale: Bucksport, Maine, (Hancock County, Maine)
- Official name: Waldo–Hancock Bridge
- Maintained by: Maine Department of Transportation
- ID number: (Bridge No. 2973)

Characteristics
- Design: Suspension bridge
- Total length: 2,040 ft (621.8 m)
- Width: 20 ft (6.1 m) roadway with Two 3 1/2 ft (1.1 m) sidewalks
- Height: 236 ft (71.9 m)
- Longest span: 800 ft (243.8 m)
- Clearance below: 135 ft (41.1 m)

History
- Construction start: 1929
- Construction end: 1931
- Opened: November 16, 1931
- Closed: December 30, 2006 (Demolished 2013)

Statistics
- Toll: 1931–1953
- Waldo–Hancock Bridge
- Formerly listed on the U.S. National Register of Historic Places
- Location: US 1 and SR 3, Verona, Maine
- Area: 4 acres (1.6 ha)
- Built: 1931
- Architect: Robinson & Steinman
- Architectural style: Suspension
- NRHP reference No.: 85001267

Significant dates
- Added to NRHP: June 20, 1985
- Removed from NRHP: December 18, 2013

Location
- Interactive map of Waldo–Hancock Bridge

The Waldo–Hancock Bridge was the first long-span suspension bridge erected in Maine, as well as the first permanent bridge across the Penobscot River downstream from Bangor. The name comes from connecting Waldo and Hancock counties. The bridge was built in 1931 and retired in 2006, when the new Penobscot Narrows Bridge was opened just a few yards away. Demolition of the structure was completed by 2013.

The bridge was 2,040 feet (621.8 m) long with a clear center span of 800 feet (243.8 m) between towers. It had two 350-foot (106.7 m) side spans and carried a 20-foot (6.1 m) wide roadway with two 3 1/2-foot (1.1 m) sidewalks. It used stiffening trusses that are 9 feet (2.7 m) deep. Each of the main catenary cables were 9 5/8 inches (24.4 cm) in diameter, and consisted of 37 strands of 37 wires. The deck was 135 feet (41.1 m) above water level to allow passage of large ships. The total cost of the span was less than $850,000 in 1931 dollars (about $12 million in 2010 dollars), significantly under its allocated budget.

== Construction ==
David B. Steinman, of Robinson and Steinman, was the designer. The bridge was fabricated by American Bridge Company (superstructure) and Merritt-Chapman & Scott (substructure).

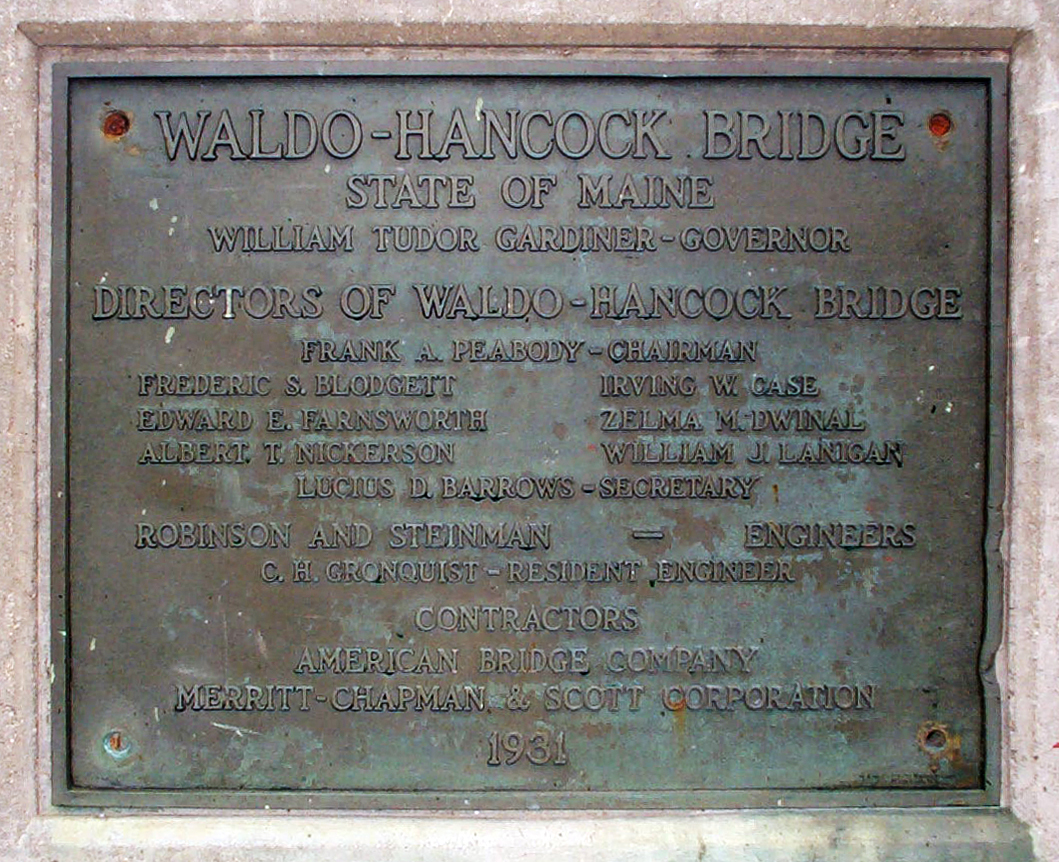
Dedication plaque, 1931

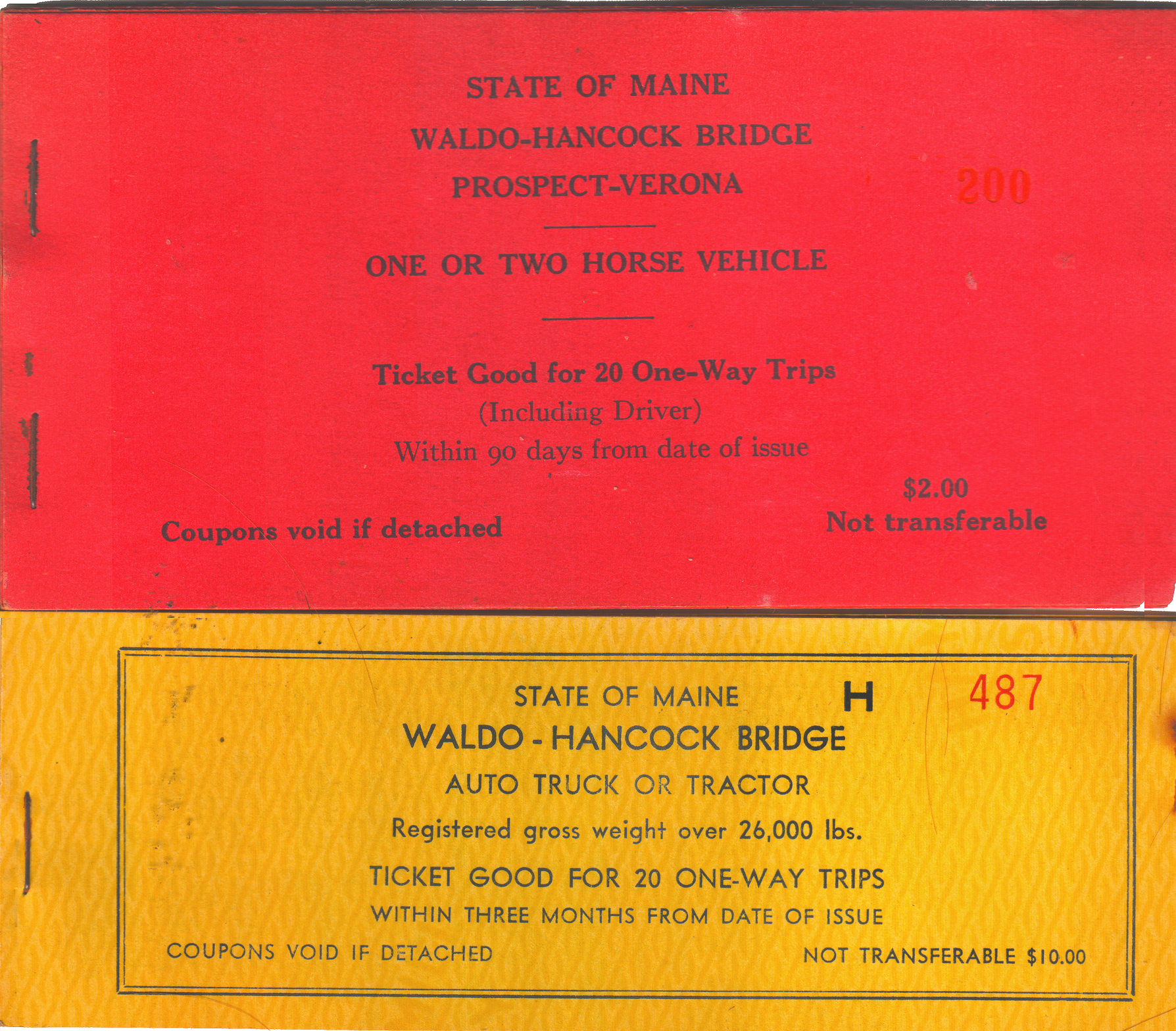
Toll ticket books, c1935

Technologically, the Waldo–Hancock Bridge represented a number of firsts. It was one of the first two bridges in the U.S. (along with the St. Johns Bridge in Portland, Oregon, completed in June 1931) to employ Robinson and Steinman's prestressed twisted wire strand cables, which were first used on the 1929 Grand Mère Suspension Bridge over the Saint-Maurice River in Quebec. The prefabrication and prestressing of the cables decreased the number of field adjustments required, saving considerable time, effort, and money. As an additional experiment in efficiency, the Waldo–Hancock cables were marked prior to construction, ensuring proper setting. This method had never been used before and proved successful in this instance. These innovations, invented and pioneered by Steinman, were a significant step forward for builders of suspension bridges.

The Waldo–Hancock was also the first bridge to make use of the Vierendeel truss in its two towers, giving it an effect that Steinman called "artistic, emphasizing horizontal and vertical lines." This attractive and effective truss design was later used in a number of important bridges, including the Triborough Bridge and Golden Gate Bridge.

The Waldo–Hancock Bridge was noted at the time for its economy of design and construction. It cost far less than had been appropriated by the State Highway Commission, which enabled the construction of a second bridge between Verona Island and Bucksport. When opened in 1931 the bridge collected tolls used to retire the bonds issued to finance its construction. All tolls were lifted twenty-two years later on October 31, 1953, however, when those original construction bonds were paid off. Original tolls ranged from 10¢ for "one or two horse vehicle including driver" to 50¢ for "auto truck or tractor over 26,000 pounds".

== Rehabilitation, replacement, and retirement ==
As the bridge approached its seventieth anniversary with the end of the century, a series of routine safety inspections made by the Maine Department of Transportation revealed that over those seven decades the structure's two main suspension cables and the many vertical bridge deck stringers had become seriously corroded, thereby deteriorating their ability to support the deck, roadway and the traffic that crossed it. These engineering studies made it clear that the bridge required immediate major rehabilitation and eventual replacement.

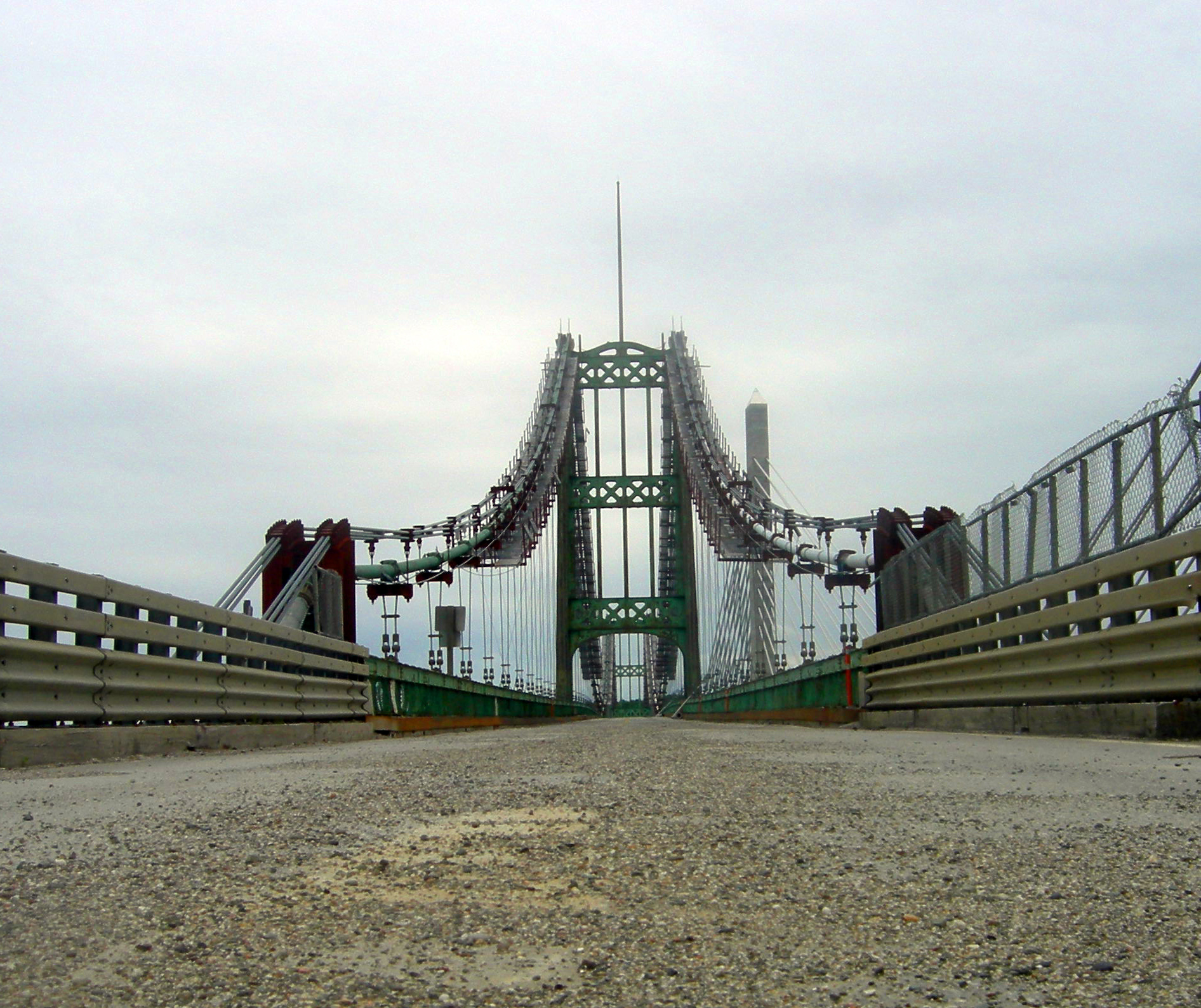
The closed Waldo-Hancock Bridge in 2007 still showing its temporarily repaired cables

Work was undertaken to rehabilitate the bridge starting in 2000 by Cianbro and Piasecki Steel Construction Corp. with cable work by Williamsport Wirerope Works Inc., by focusing on strengthening the cables. The two cables were done separately, one a time. Piasecki Steel Construction Corp. of Castleton, New York, rehabilitated the north cable in 2002. At this point the bridge was discovered to be beyond permanent repair and would have to be abandoned and replaced by a new structure to be built adjacent to the aging bridge. Work then shifted to temporary strengthening. For the south cable, MDOT in August 2003 hired Pittsfield, Maine-based Cianbro Corp. under a $4-million emergency contract.

The rehabilitation used a single wire thickness (2-inch-diameter (5.1 cm) galvanized helical 91-wire strands) to facilitate fabricating and installing the cables more quickly. New concrete anchorages with up to 30-foot-long (9.1 m) anchor rods were built by Cianbro. Crews installed continuous runs of strands on new saddles bolted and welded on new base plates atop cable bents and the main towers. Workers placed two groups of four strands 12 feet (3.7 m) above each main cable to allow for pulls. Each strand weighs 4 tons (3.6 metric tons). A rope pull was walked across, connected to a 7/8-inch-diameter (2.2 cm) pull cable, then winched back across and connected to the strand, which was fed through a tensioner holding back about 15,000 pounds (7,000 kg) to smooth the pull.

"We hooked and rehooked one strand per day on average," says Archie J. Wheaton, Cianbro project superintendent. "The strands were connected to anchor rods; then we set the sag." The new auxiliary cables are connected to existing double suspender cables by 1 1/8-inch-diameter (2.9 cm) steel rods, then tensioned with 30-ton (27.2 metric ton) jacks, bringing the new cables about 3 feet (1 m) from the main cables.

A new construction, the Penobscot Narrows Bridge, was built alongside the older one. The new bridge was opened to traffic on December 30, 2006, at which point the Waldo–Hancock Bridge was ceremoniously closed. Barricades were erected at both ends, closing the bridge to both cars and pedestrians.

== Demolition ==
The Maine Department of Transportation announced on February 14, 2012, that the bridge would be demolished starting that summer and be completed by the fall. The schedule was designed to accommodate the needs of two endangered species, the Peregrine falcon and the Shortnose sturgeon. Barges were placed in the Penobscot River onto which sections of the bridge were lowered. The concrete piers in the river are all that remains, and MDOT worked with the United States Coast Guard to design lights for them once the Bridge was removed to aid ships in the river. Later, MaineDOT announced that the low bid of $5.35 million by S&R Corp. of Lowell, Massachusetts, was accepted.

Demolition was delayed until 2012, beginning with the November 20 removal of the bridge's flag poles, and was completed in June 2013.

The Waldo-Hancock and Penobscot Narrows Bridges as viewed from the Penobscot Narrows Bridge Observatory in July 2007 and July 2013, after the Waldo-Hancock Bridge had been demolished

== Gallery ==
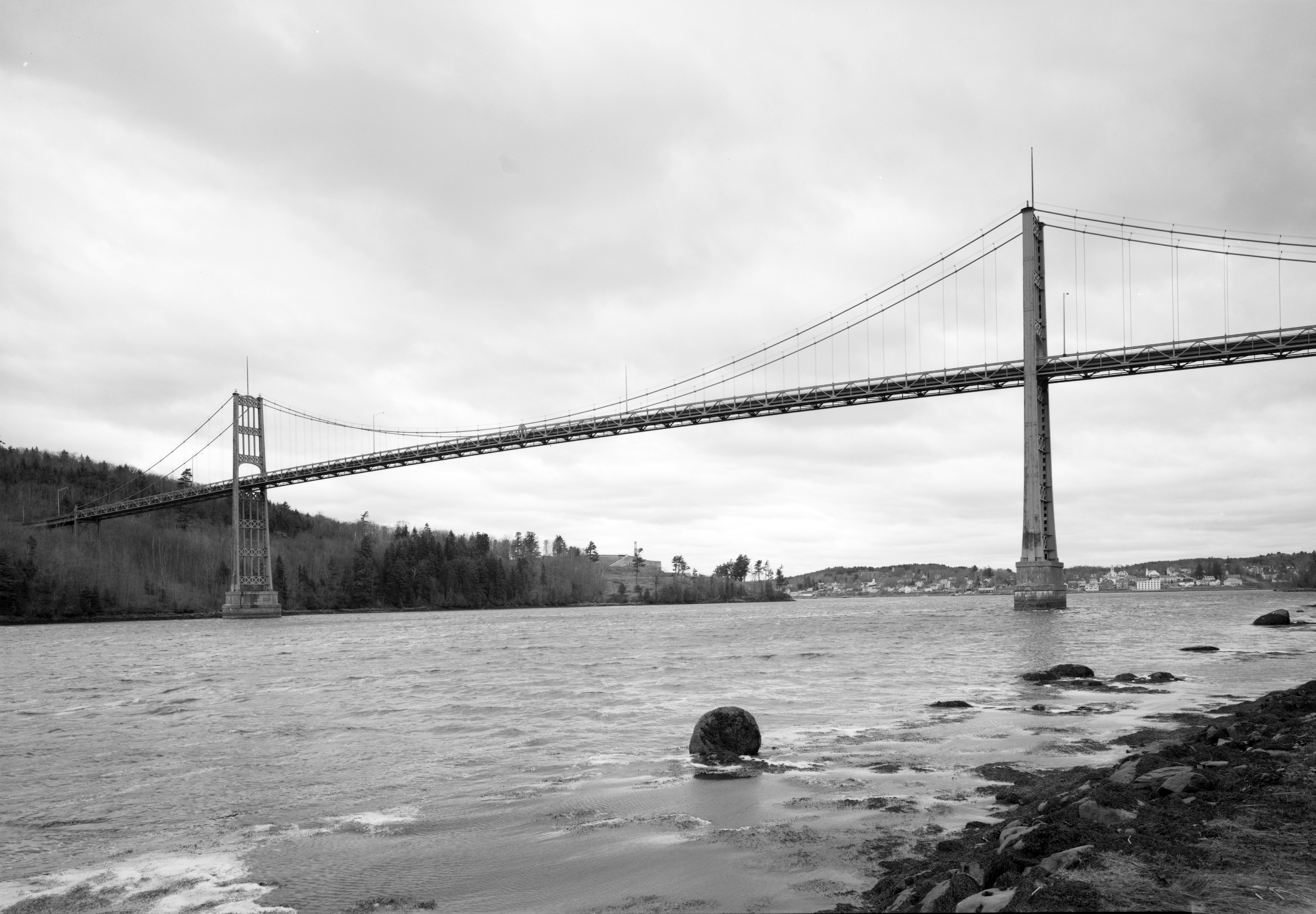
The Waldo–Hancock Bridge, Ft. Knox, and Bucksport, Maine, seen from Verona Island (1994)

The Waldo–Hancock Bridge as seen from the Waldo County approach looking toward Verona Island (2001)

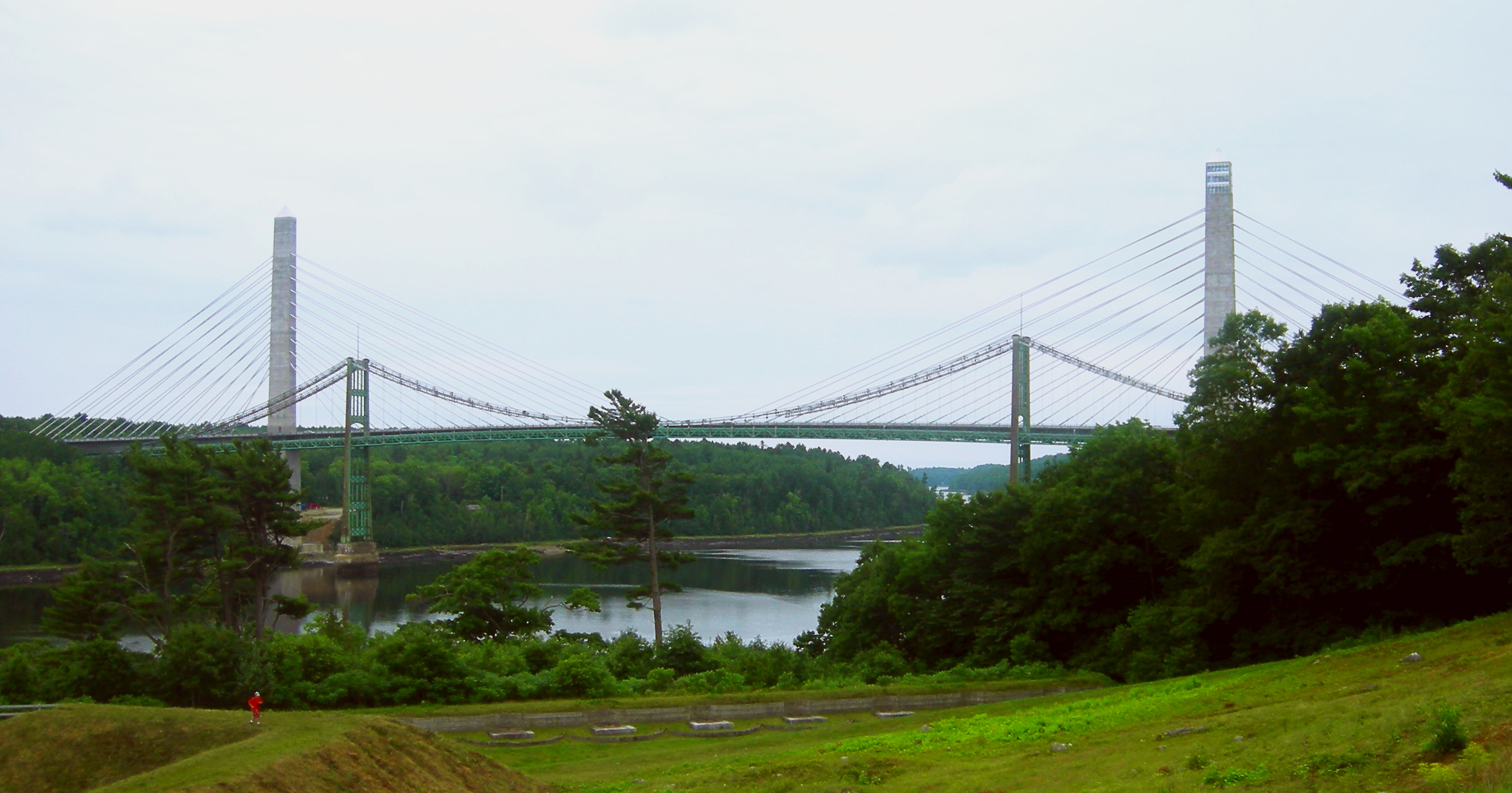
The Waldo-Hancock and Penobscot Narrows Bridges from Ft. Knox (2007)

The Waldo-Hancock and Penobscot Narrows Bridges entering Verona Island viewed from the west tower observatory (2007)

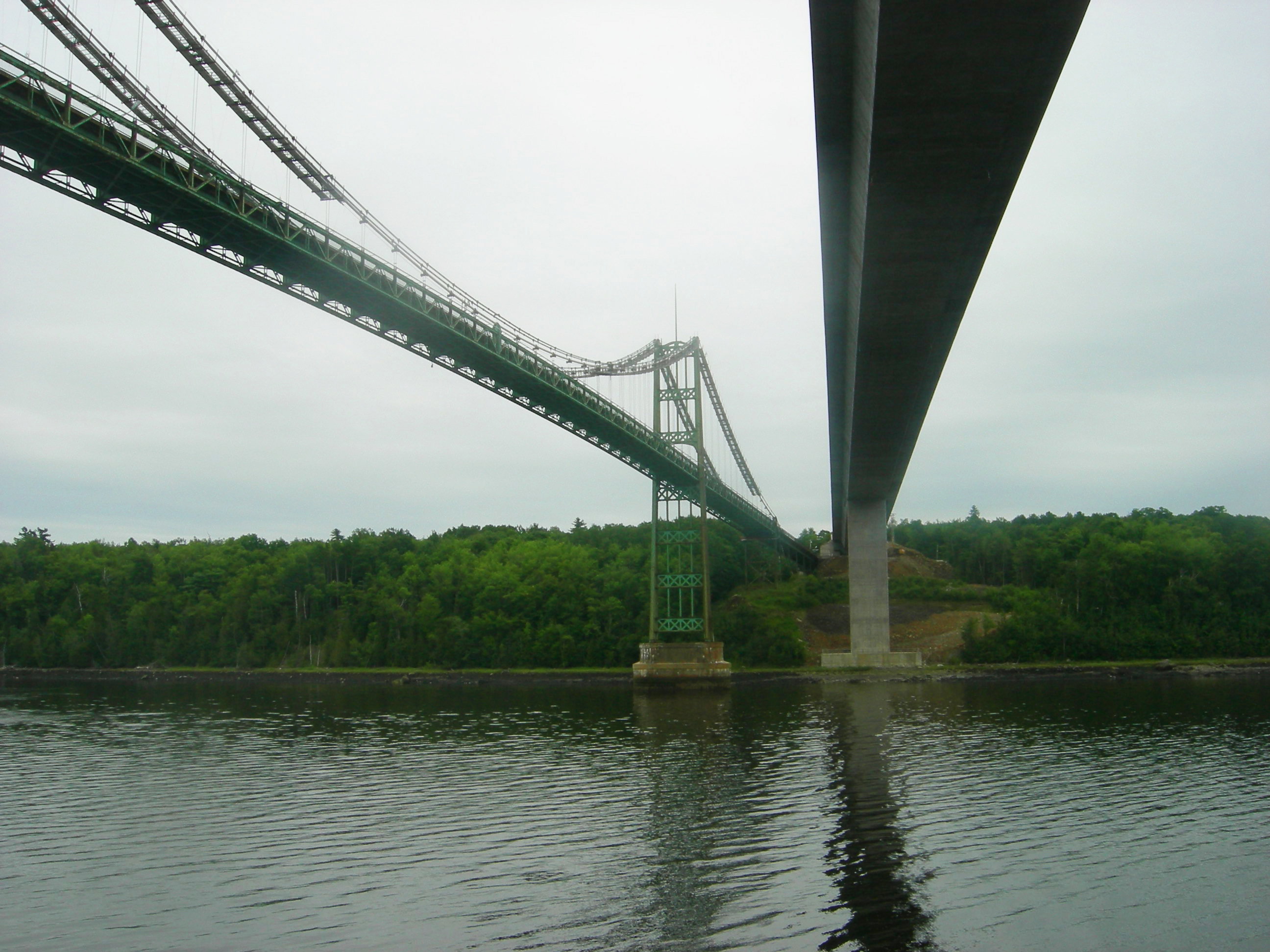
The Waldo-Hancock and Penobscot Narrows Bridges entering Verona Island viewed from below (2007)

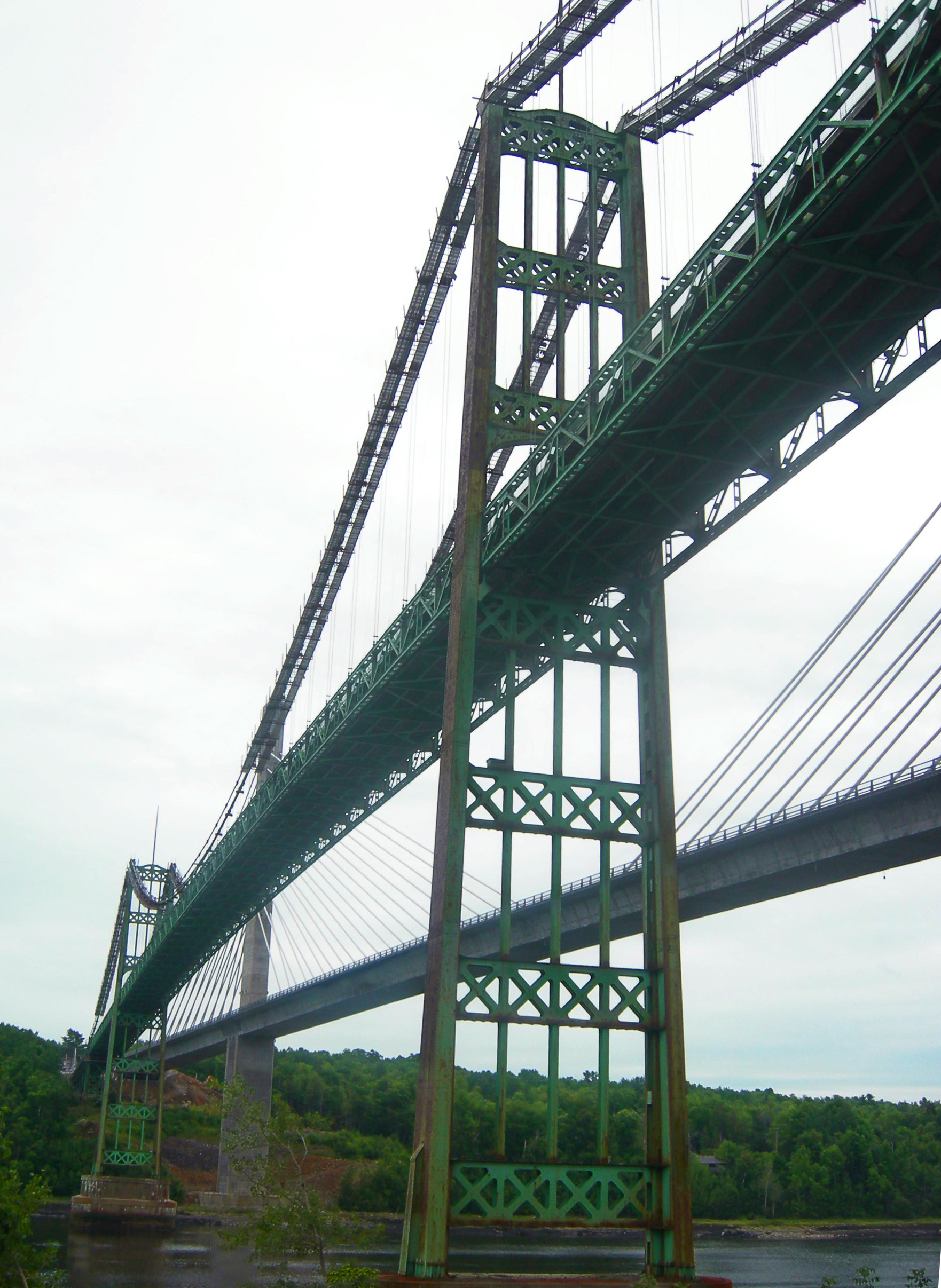
The Waldo-Hancock and Penobscot Narrows Bridges entering Verona Island viewed from below (2007)

== See also ==
- List of bridges documented by the Historic American Engineering Record in Maine
