= Merrill House =

Merrill House may refer to: (sorted by state, then city/town)

- Merrill House (Arkansas), Rogers, Arkansas listed on the National Register of Historic Places (NRHP) in Benton County
- Charles W. Merrill House, Orinda, California, listed on the NRHP in Contra Costa County
- Samuel Merrill House, Pasadena, California, listed on the NRHP in Los Angeles County
- Merrill House (Maine), Andover, Maine, listed on the NRHP in Cumberland County
- Capt. Reuel and Lucy Merrill House, Cumberland Center Station, Maine, listed on the NRHP in Cumberland County
- Merrill Hall, Farmington, Maine, listed on the NRHP in Franklin County
- Merrill House (Florida), Jacksonville, Florida
- Capt. Reuben Merrill House, Yarmouth, Maine, listed on the NRHP in Cumberland County
- Merrill Estate, Barnstable, Massachusetts, listed on the NRHP in Contra Barnstable County
- Merrill Double House, Worcester, Massachusetts, listed on the NRHP in Worcester County
- Harry Merrill House, Hutchinson, Minnesota, listed on the NRHP in McLeod County
- Merrill-Newhardt House, Iuka, Mississippi, listed on the NRHP in Tishomingo County
- Merrill-Maley House, Jackson, Mississippi, listed on the NRHP in Hinds County
- Baker-Merrill House, Easton, New York, listed on the NRHP in Washington County
- Louis Edgar and Clara H. Merrill House, Richmond, Utah, listed on the NRHP in Cache County
- R. D. Merrill House, Seattle, Washington, listed on the NRHP in King County
- Levi Merrill House, Eau Claire, Wisconsin, listed on the NRHP in Eau Claire County
- Lovejoy and Merrill-Nowlan Houses, Janesville, Wisconsin, listed on the NRHP in Rock County

== See also ==
- Henry Merrell House
