= The Myth of Fingerprints =

- Theatrical release poster
- Directed by: Bart Freundlich
- Written by: Bart Freundlich
- Produced by: Bart Freundlich; Tim Perell; Mary Jane Skalski
- Starring: Arija Bareikis; Blythe Danner; Hope Davis; Laurel Holloman; Brian Kerwin; James LeGros; Julianne Moore; Roy Scheider; Michael Vartan; Noah Wyle
- Cinematography: Stephen Kazmierski
- Edited by: Ken J. Sackerham; Kate Williams
- Music by: David Bridie; John Phillips
- Production company: Good Machine
- Distributed by: Sony Pictures Classics
- Release dates: January 1997 (Sundance); September 17, 1997 (United States)
- Running time: 93 minutes
- Country: United States
- Language: English
- Budget: $2 million
- Box office: $458,815

The Myth of Fingerprints is a 1997 American drama film written and directed by Bart Freundlich. It stars Blythe Danner, Roy Scheider, Noah Wyle, and Julianne Moore. The story follows the gathering of a dysfunctional family during Thanksgiving in New England.

The film premiered at the 1997 Sundance Film Festival and later received a limited release on September 17, 1997. The film's title originates from Paul Simon's 1986 song "All Around the World or the Myth of Fingerprints" and is a reference to the idea of blood ties and differing personalities amongst family members.

== Plot ==
Three adult children reconvene at their family homestead in Maine for the Thanksgiving holiday. Though mother Lena is warm and engaging, father Hal is aloof. Artist Mia, the eldest sibling, arrives with her psychotherapist boyfriend, Elliott. Jake, who was considered the popular jock of the family, brings along his outspoken girlfriend Margaret. Warren, the youngest son, arrives alone, having not been home for three years. Youngest kid Leigh still lives with her parents.

Over the course of the weekend, long-simmering resentments between family members come to the surface. Jake cannot bring himself to admit his love for Margaret, while Warren, still pining for his ex-girlfriend Daphne, meets up with her while in town and learns some upsetting news which leads to a physical confrontation with his father. Mia reunites with Cezanne, a former grade-school classmate who has long had a crush on her.

== Cast ==
- Julianne Moore as Mia
- Roy Scheider as Hal
- Blythe Danner as Lena
- Noah Wyle as Warren
- Arija Bareikis as Daphne
- Hope Davis as Margaret
- Laurel Holloman as Leigh
- Michael Vartan as Jake
- Brian Kerwin as Elliott
- James LeGros as Cezanne
- Chris Bauer as Jerry

== Production ==
Writer-director Bart Freundlich was able to secure big names for the ensemble cast on the strength of his screenplay. Said Roy Scheider, ''I did it because of the story. Bart wrote characters you wanted to play. All of us know it's unlikely the film will make money, but we're always looking for something this interesting. He wrote characters that really grab you.''

Of the film's title, Freundlich explained, "A fingerprint points to the fact that all these people are genetically related and, in a lot of ways, are very similar to one another. But the children in the family have also developed very differently from one another. The question it presents is: how much are their identities tied to where they grew up and to who was around them? And how much of their personalities have they had to create from scratch in order to go on with their lives? That's what fingerprints represent to me--these people's identities: something that on the one hand is genetic, and thus inherited, and yet at the same time is completely unique."

The film was shot in Andover at The Merrill House, and in Bethel, and Waterville, Maine.

== Release ==
The film had its world premiere at the 1997 Sundance Film Festival, where it was acquired by Sony Pictures Classics. A theatrical release was initially planned for that April, but Sony decided to hold onto it until the fall season.

== Critical reception ==
On Rotten Tomatoes, The Myth of Fingerprints has an approval rating of 64% based on 25 reviews. On Metacritic, the film has a score of 58 based on 17 reviews, indicating "mixed or average reviews".

The performances of the ensemble cast were praised, with Todd McCarthy of Variety noting "Freundlich has a knack for clever, amusing lines that reveal character traits and attitudes." Criticisms centered on the screenplay and how it did not sufficiently flesh out the characters and their relationships with one another. Stephen Holden of The New York Times opined the film fails "to knit its self-pitying characters into a credible family unit", and multiple critics felt the behavior of family patriarch Hal was left unaddressed.

Charles Taylor of Salon called Moore a "startlingly intelligent actress,” but noted in the film she is stuck playing a “conception, not a part." He expressed that of all the family members, Danner’s character is the one that most feels like a fully realized person. Taylor concluded, "The Myth of Fingerprints, with its sensitive acoustic music and finicky composed shots of wintry landscapes and relentlessly subdued tone, is a reminder of the problem identified by Pauline Kael in her reviews of Interiors and Ordinary People: Movies about WASP repression invariably wind up aping the tidy, stultified lives they're meant to reveal. The Myth of Fingerprints is only 90 minutes long, but...you can't help thinking that if you were watching a Jewish family or an Italian one, the air would be cleared -- and you'd be out of the theater -- a hell of a lot quicker."

In October 1997, Serena Donadoni of the Detroit Metro Times compared it to The House of Yes, another Thanksgiving-based family drama which premiered at Sundance 1997 and later received a theatrical release in the fall of that year. Donadoni wrote, "Thanksgiving, the anathema of dysfunctional families, is the focus of two very different film debuts: The Myth of Fingerprints, from writer-director Bart Freundlich, and The House of Yes, directed by Mark Waters (no relation to John), who adapted it from Wendy MacLeod's play." She called The Myth of Fingerprints "hushed and muted, its tone mirroring the less-than-communicative WASPs at its center", adding that "Fingerprints is aided greatly by a moody score from Not Drowning, Waving, and a goofy yet charming comic performance by James LeGros as Moore's forgotten first love."
