= Maine State Route 120 =

State highway in Oxford County, Maine, US

State Route 120

Route information
- Maintained by MaineDOT
- Length: 15.16 mi (24.40 km)
- Existed: 1925–present

Major junctions
- West end: SR 5 in Andover
- East end: US 2 in Rumford

Location
- Country: United States
- State: Maine
- Counties: Oxford

Highway system
- Maine State Highway System; Interstate; US; State; Auto trails; Lettered highways
← SR 119	→ SR 121

State Route 120 (SR 120) is a state route in the U.S. state of Maine that runs from SR 5 in Andover to the U.S. Route 2 (US 2) and Lincoln Avenue intersection in Rumford. SR 120 runs through the towns of Roxbury and Mexico as well.

== Route description ==
SR 120 begins in the center of Andover at the intersection of Main Street and Newton Street. This point is also the northern terminus of SR 5. SR 120 heads east along Elm Street until it crosses the West Branch Ellis River where it then heads southeast briefly paralleling the river. At East Andover Road, the highway turns to the east onto Roxbury Pond Road eventually entering Roxbury. Before reaching Ellis Pond, SR 120 makes a sharp turn to the southeast onto Roxbury Notch Road where it travels around the southern base of Partridge Peak at Roxbury Notch. Descending from here, it begins to closely parallel the Swift River. Before existing Roxbury, it intersects Crossover Road, the first of many roads crossing the river providing access to SR 17 on the opposite side of the river. It continues south winding its way alongside the river through the town of Mexico before entering Rumford. Passing Mountain Valley High School, SR 120 enters a residential neighborhood of the city where it travels along Hancock Street. The highway ends at the intersection of Hancock Street and Lincoln Street where US 2 heads south and east from here.

== Major intersections ==
The entire route is in Oxford County.

Location	mi	km	Destinations	Notes
Andover	0.00	0.00	SR 5 south (Main Street) / Newton Street	Northern terminus of SR 5
Rumford	15.16	24.40	US 2 (Lincoln Avenue / Hancock Street) – Bethel, Mexico, Wilton	
1.000 mi = 1.609 km; 1.000 km = 0.621 mi
