= Ellis River =

Ellis River may refer to different rivers:

- Ellis River (Maine), United States
- Ellis River (New Hampshire), United States
- Ellis River (New Zealand)

== See also ==
- Ellis (disambiguation)
- West Branch Ellis River
