= Andover Earth Station =

Radio horn antenna in Maine, US

Coordinates: 44°37′58.0″N 70°41′57.0″W

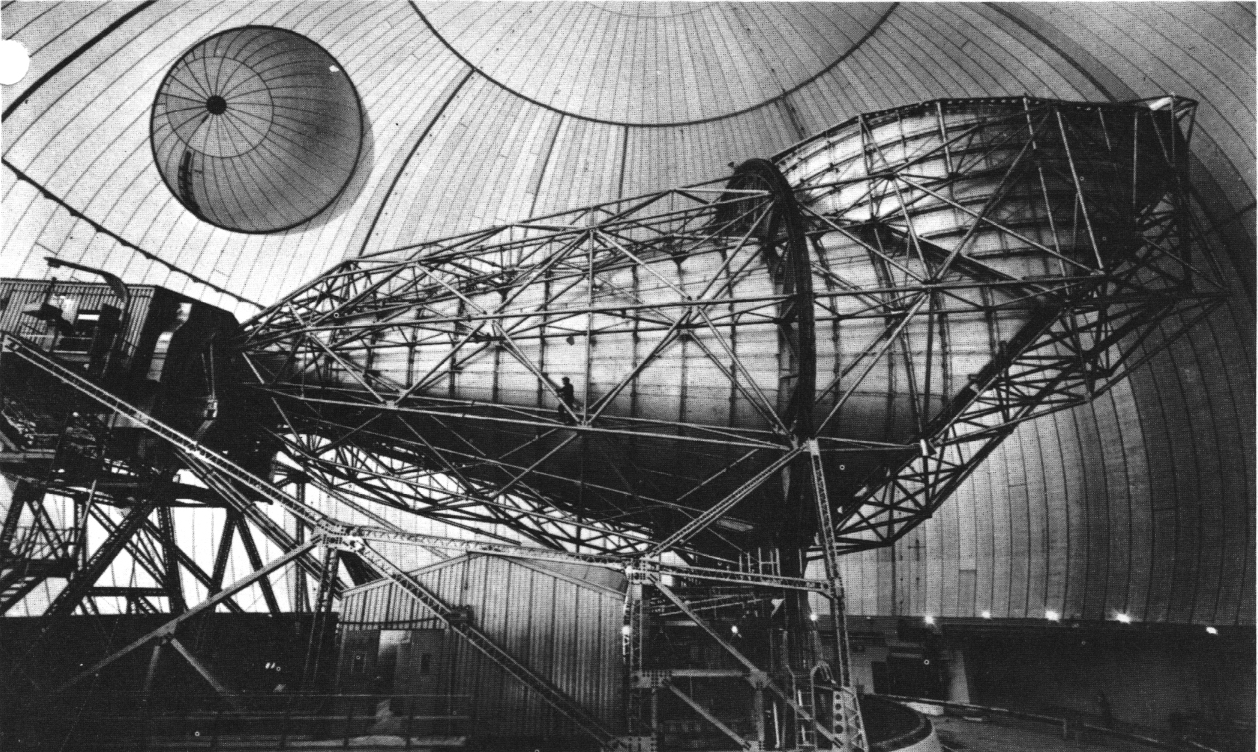
The 7-story tall horn antenna within the radome at Andover Earth Station. This type of antenna is called a Hogg or horn-reflector antenna, invented by Albert Beck and Harald Friis in 1941 and further developed by D. L. Hogg at Bell Telephone Laboratories in 1961. It consists of a flaring metal horn with a metal paraboloidal reflector mounted in the mouth at a 45° angle. The advantage of this design over a parabolic dish antenna is that it has very low sidelobes; that is, the horn shields the antenna from radiation from angles outside the main beam axis, such as ground noise.

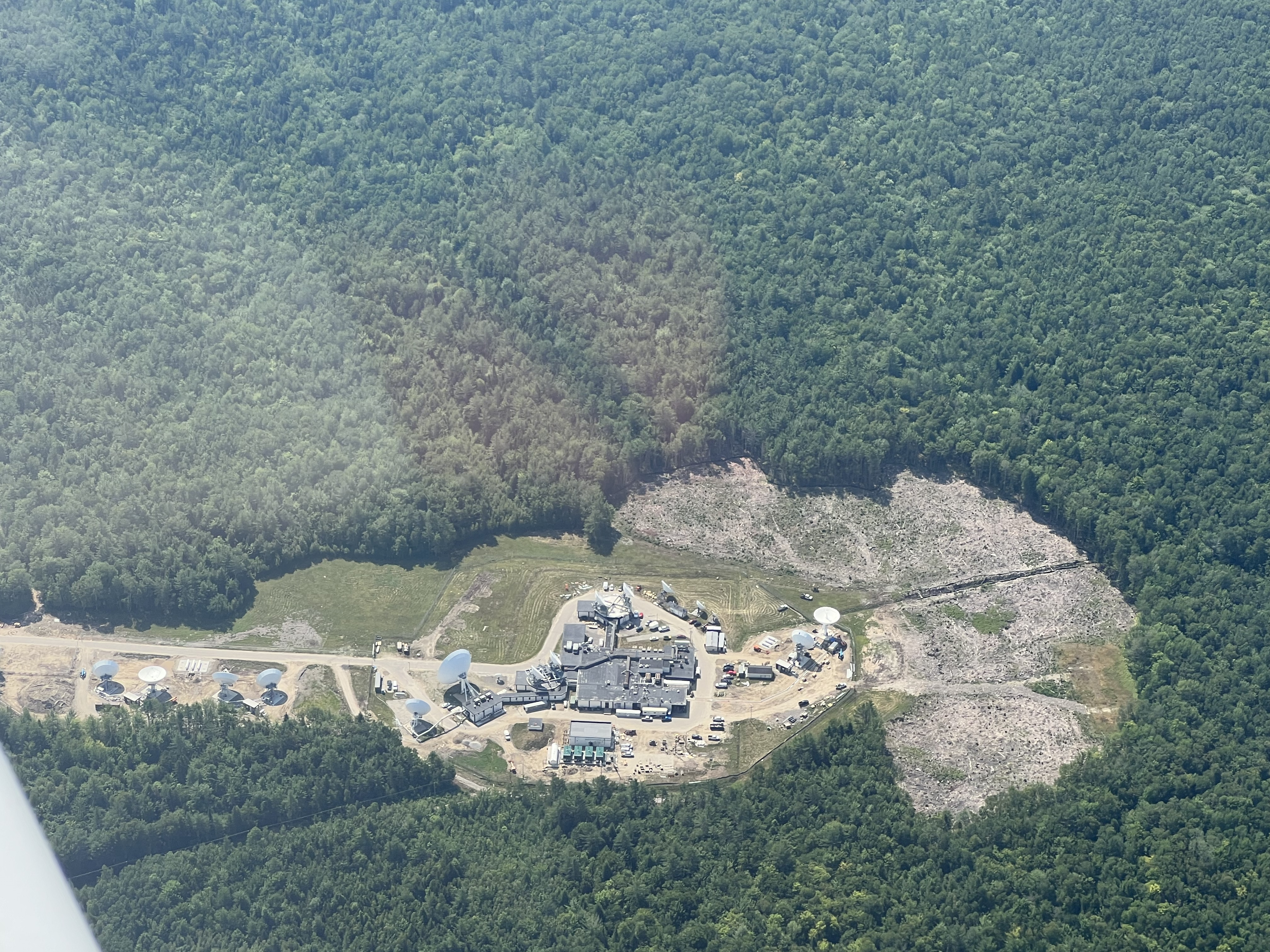
Aerial view of Andover Earth Station taken on 20 July 2022

Andover Earth Station was one of the first satellite earth stations, located at Andover in the US state of Maine. It was built by AT&T in 1961 to communicate with the Telstar 1 satellite, the first direct relay communications satellite. It provided the first experimental satellite telephone and television service between North America and Europe. It was also used with the Relay satellite. The giant horn was dismantled in the mid-1980s along with the visitor center.

The location was selected by AT&T in December 1960. The main factors were the topography (set in the Western Maine Mountains), and the radio interference signal level. Other factors included a location in the Northeastern United States to give a short great circle path to Western Europe, it was located close enough to existing transcontinental radio relay television and telephone routes to facilitate interconnection. In addition, the site had to be large enough to accommodate an antenna structure and control building, and if necessary, provide room for expansion.

Land was purchased in January 1961, and construction of the complex began on May 1. Building construction was completed and the equipment was installed in February 1962. The Ground Station was operational in the Spring of 1962. AT&T and Bell Labs initiated, funded, constructed and took the leadership to make this project possible.

The radio transmitter aboard Telstar was very low-powered compared to modern communication satellites, with a power of only 14 watts, and transmitted through an omnidirectional antenna, so the ground antennas that communicated with it had to be huge, with very large apertures to receive enough radio power from the satellite to be intelligible. The Andover Earth Station was equipped with a giant horn antenna, 7 stories high and weighing 340 tons. To protect it from bad weather, a radome made of Dacron covered the antenna. It was 160 feet (49 m) high, 210 feet (64 m) wide and weighed 30 tons. Since the satellite was not in a geostationary orbit like modern communication satellites, it passed overhead quickly, and the giant antenna had to be precisely steerable to track the satellite as it moved across the sky.

Telstar was launched on July 10, 1962, from the Cape Canaveral Air Force Station and went into orbit at 4:46 a.m. The engineers at the Andover Earth Station would have to wait 15 hours for the satellite, travelling at a rate of 5 miles per second (8 km/s), 3,000 miles (4,800 km) above the earth to reach within their "view". The engineers successfully sent a signal to Telstar, which amplified it 10 billion times and relayed it back to Andover.

Eugene F. O'Neill, Telstar Project Director and IEEE Fellow, oversaw the success of this project at Andover. He noted that one of the challenges was pointing an extremely sharp beam very accurately at the satellite. At 7:17 p.m. he announced "We've acquired Telstar!" At 7:31 p.m. an American flag at Andover appeared on the television screen. Then at 7:47 p.m. engineers at Andover received word that the French site, Pleumeur-Bodou Ground Station, had received the television picture.

The Large radome was torn down and land returned to nature in the 1985.

MCI purchased the Andover Earth station in 1987, MCI was later purchased by Verizon including the Andover Earth station in 2006 and managed under the Verizon Business name. The site still operates to this day as part of Verizon's Satellite Solution group supporting satellite operations for Verizon.
