= Mountain Valley High School =

Location
- 799 Hancock Street; Rumford, Maine 04276; United States; 44°33′50″N 70°33′34″W

Information
- School type: Public
- Established: 1989; 37 years ago
- School district: Regional School Unit 10
- Superintendent: Deborah Alden
- School code: 200865
- Principal: Thomas Danylik
- Staff: 32.30 (FTE)
- Faculty: 42
- Grades: 9-12
- Average class size: 15
- Student to teacher ratio: 13.07
- Colors: Cobalt blue Silver
- Song: Falcon's Fly
- Athletics conference: Mountain Valley Conference
- Mascot: Falcon
- Nickname: Falcons
- Rival: Cape Elizabeth High School
- USNWR ranking: 1. 1
- Yearbook: Wings
- Communities served: Rumford, Mexico, Roxbury, Byron
- Website: www.rsu10.org/o/mvhs

Mountain Valley High School (Mountain Valley or MVHS) is a public high school in Rumford, Maine, United States, serving the towns of Rumford and nearby Mexico. It was formed in 1989 as a result of the merger of the town's two previous high schools. During the 2007–08 school year, MVHS had 589 enrolled students, 64 faculty, and 147 students in the graduating class.

== Athletics ==
Football: On November 14, 2010, Mountain Valley won the Western Maine Class B championship with an 18–0 win over Wells High School and later won the state championship against Leavitt. It was the 5th Western Maine Class B championship in the last 7 seasons. The team won the Class B championships in 2004, 2006, 2008, and 2010. The seniors, led by captains Taylor Bradley, Cam Kaubris, and Christian Durland, dedicated their state championship in 2010 to former teammate, Danny Garneau, who died of cancer the year before.
