= French Island, Maine =

French Island, Maine may refer to:

- An island in Ellis Pond
- A neighborhood in Old Town, Maine
