= French Island =

French Island may refer to:

== Australia ==
- French Island (Victoria), an island

== United States ==
- French Island, Wisconsin, a village and an island
- French Island, an island in Ellis Pond, Oxford County, Maine
- French Island, a neighbourhood of Old Town, Penobscot County, Maine

== See also ==
- Île-de-France (disambiguation)
