= Ellis River (Maine) =

River in Maine

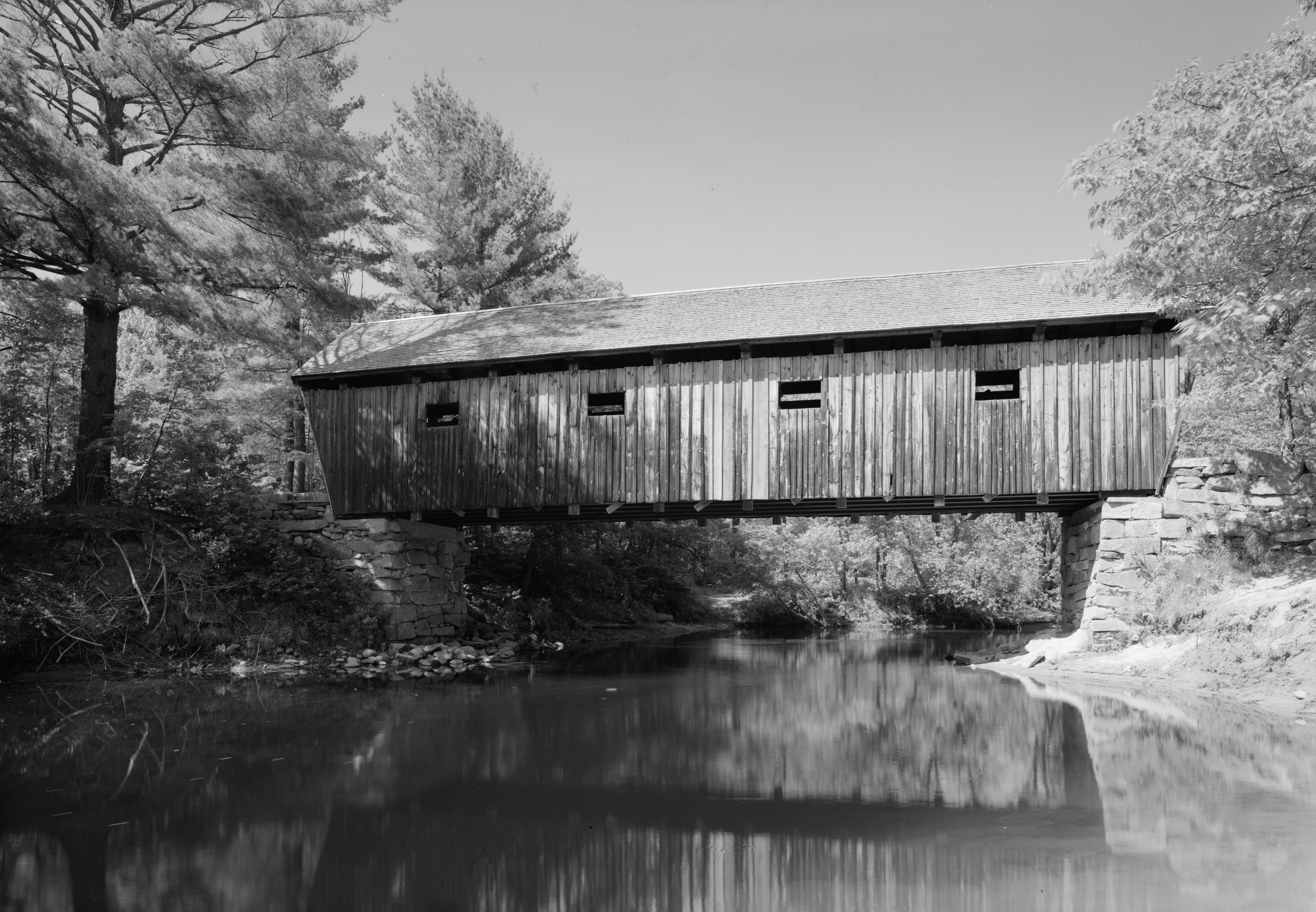
- The Ellis River and the Lovejoy Bridge

Location
- Country: United States
- State: Maine

Physical characteristics
- Source: Ellis Pond
  - location: Oxford County, Maine
  - coordinates: 44°39′17″N 70°41′3″W
  - elevation: 812 feet (247 m)
- Mouth: Androscoggin River
  - location: Oxford County, Maine
  - coordinates: 44°30′18″N 70°40′25″W
  - elevation: 605 feet (184 m)
- Length: 23 mi (37 km)

Basin features
- Tributaries
  - left: West Branch Ellis River

The Ellis River is a 23-mile-long (37 km) river in Oxford County in western Maine. It is a tributary of the Androscoggin River.

The river begins at the outlet of Ellis Pond in the northwest corner of Roxbury and flows southwest via a meandering course into Andover, passing the village of East Andover before turning more to the southeast near South Andover. The river enters the corporate limits of Rumford and joins the Androscoggin at the village of Rumford Point.

From South Andover to the river's mouth, the Ellis River is followed by Maine State Route 5. U.S. Route 2 crosses the river just above its outlet to the Androscoggin.
