= Pleumeur-Bodou Ground Station =

Historical ground station in France

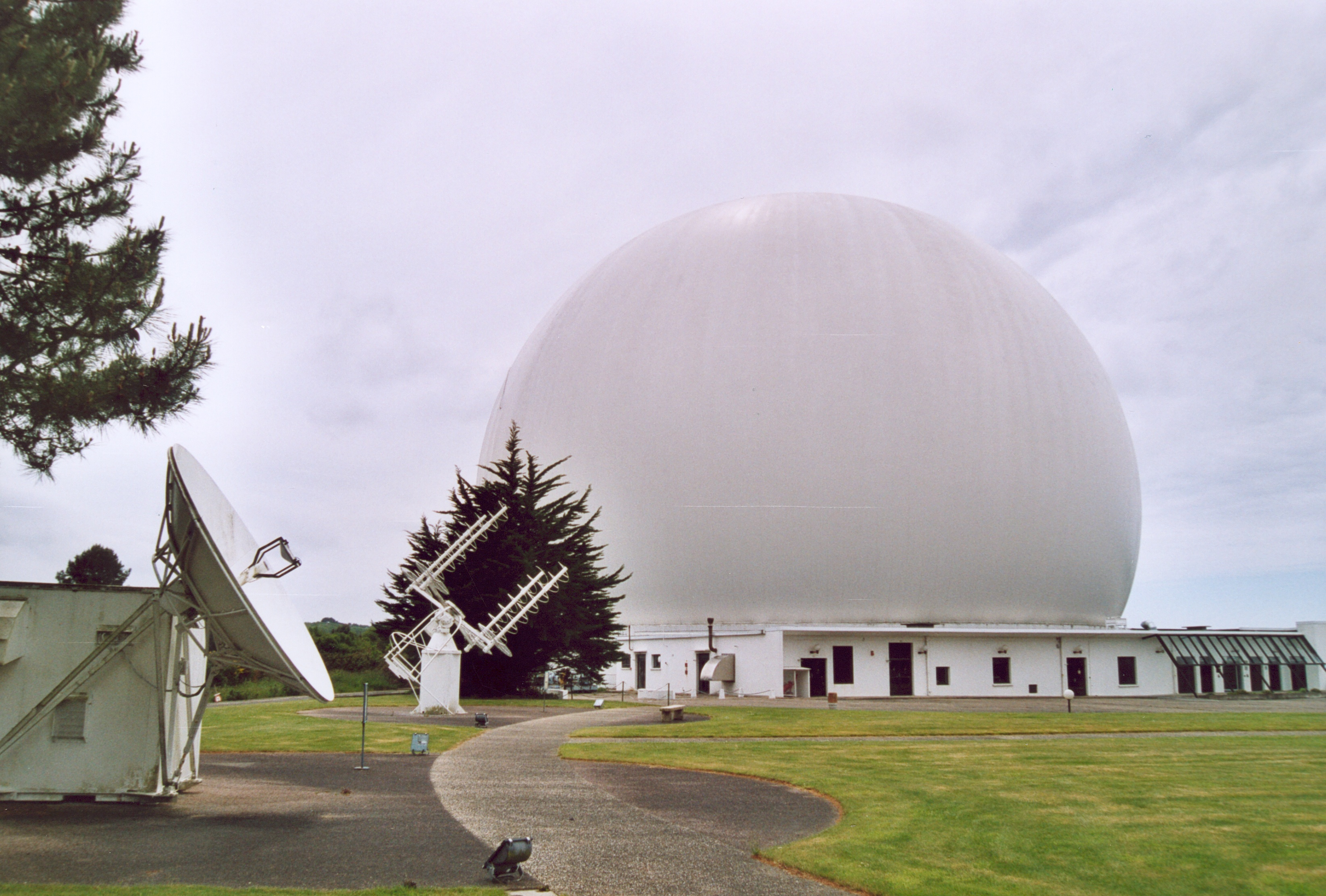
- Earth receiving dishes in 2008

- Location within Brittany

General information
- Type: Earth station
- Location: Pleumeur-Bodou, Brittany
- Coordinates: 48.785°N 3.524°W
- Construction started: 1961
- Completed: 1962

Pleumeur-Bodou Ground Station was an early ground station in north-west France, and one of the first in the world. It was the site of the first satellite transmission between the US and Europe in the early morning of 11 July 1962 (French time), lasting 19 minutes on the satellite's seventh orbit.

== History ==
The tracking station was developed by France Télécom, now known as Orange S.A. The site was built by the Centre national d'études des télécommunications, which became France Télécom R&D in 2000.

There was also another nearby tracking station at Lannion, which is also the landing point for the Apollo cable from the USA.

In the vicinity of the station French telecommunication companies had established research and development facilities in 1981.

France Télécom ensured daily air communication between Paris (Villacoublay airport) and Lannion.

=== First transatlantic satellite broadcast ===
The first transatlantic satellite broadcast took place at the site on the morning of 11 July 1962 via the Telstar 1 satellite. Later that day, France broadcast back to the USA via the satellite. The station antenna was a 60 m long conical horn antenna.

== Structure ==
The site is around three miles east of Trébeurden. The site has three large parabolic antennas.

=== Antennas ===
- PB8

== See also ==
- Raisting Satellite Earth Station, in Germany
- TAT-1, first submarine transatlantic telephone cable, on 25 September 1956
- TAT-8, first transatlantic fibre-optic cable in 1988
- Transatlantic communications cable
