= John Orville Newton =

American politician (1864–1958)

John Orville Newton (April 5, 1864 – December 29, 1958) was a school principal and state representative in Maine. Newton served as the principal of Kents Hill School for 24 years. He was succeeded by Thomas Wess Watkins.

== Early life ==
John Orville Newton was born on April 5, 1864, in Andover, Maine, the son of John Dustin and Eunice Catherine Newton. He attended Kents Hill School when it was known as Maine Wesleyan Seminary and Women's College, graduating in 1888. He later graduated from Wesleyan University in 1893 and from Harvard University Summer School in 1902. While as Wesleyan, Newton was a member of Delta Kappa Epsilon.

== Kent's Hill School ==
Upon his graduation from Wesleyan, he returned to Kent's Hill School, working in the science department. He would work at Kent's Hill for 46 years, serving for 24 years as principal of the school.

== Political career ==
Newton was elected to two separate terms in the Maine House of Representatives. A Republican, Newton was elected to the House in 1935 and in 1937, serving as a member from Readfield. Upon his retirement from Kent's Hill School in 1940, Newton served as chairman of the Old Age Assistance Program and as a consultant for the Commissioner of Health and Welfare. Additionally in 1940, Newton was appointed to complete the term of Kennebec County Sheriff when the previous sheriff died.

== Personal life ==
In 1894, Newton married Addie Ola Denning from Poland in Oxford. Newton and Denning had three children: Max, Roland and Robert. Denning died in 1903. Two years following her death, Newton married Adah Louise Munroe of Auburn.

According to State Legislature files, Newton died on December 29, 1958. Other sources suggest Newton died in 1957.
