= Angel Falls (Maine) =

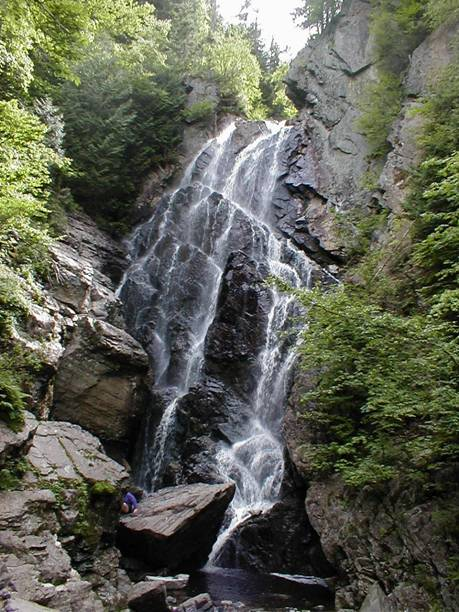
- Angel Falls, in Maine
- Interactive map of Angel Falls
- Location: Franklin County, Maine, U.S.
- Coordinates: 44.7829°N 70.7096°W
- Type: Horsetail
- Total height: 27 m (89 ft)
- Number of drops: 1
- Longest drop: 27 m (89 ft)

Angel Falls is a 90-foot (27 m) waterfall on Mountain Brook in Township D – northwest of Houghton – in the White Mountains of Franklin County, Maine. The "remarkably scenic" Angel Falls is a set of plunging tiers totaling 90 feet (27 m) in height, and with surrounding cliffs of 115 feet (35 m) in height. Flowing out of a 25-foot-wide gap (7.6 m) in the cliff, it is thought by many to be the tallest waterfall in Maine, tied for height with Moxie Falls, though this is not the case; as Katahdin Falls, also in Maine, is some 710 feet (220 m) taller. Angel Falls is so named as, when the water flow is right, the falls appear as an angel.

== See also ==
- List of waterfalls
