= Andover Public Library =

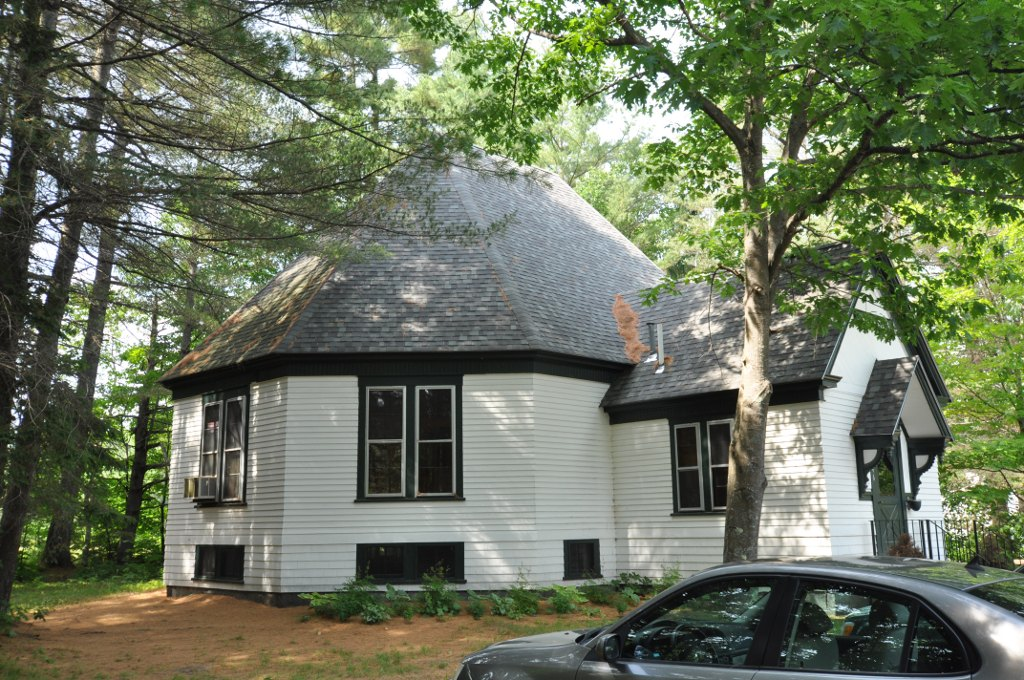
- 44°37′54.5″N 70°45′5″W
- Location: 46 Church Street, Andover, Maine, U.S., United States
- Type: Public
- Established: 1899; 127 years ago

Collection
- Size: 12,626

Access and use
- Circulation: 4,280
- Population served: 752

Other information
- Budget: $27,807
- Director: Janet Farrington
- Employees: 2
- Website: www.andover.lib.me.us
- Andover Public Library
- U.S. National Register of Historic Places
- Location within Maine Location within the United States
- Location: 46 Church Street, Andover, Maine
- Built: 1899; 127 years ago
- Architectural style: Octagon Mode
- NRHP reference No.: 81000103
- Added to NRHP: January 27, 1981

The Andover Public Library is located on Church Street in Andover, Maine, United States. Although a private library funded by subscription was founded in the town in 1795, it was not until the establishment of the Andover Public Library Association in 1891 that movement to a publicly funded library began. It was originally quartered in a room of the Andover Town Hall, until 1943, when its present building was purchased from a Universalist church organization. The building is one of only two octagonal religious buildings known to have been built anywhere in Maine, and was probably the last building in the state built with inspiration from Orson Squire Fowler's promotion of octagonal buildings in the 19th century. On January 27, 1981, it was added to the National Register of Historic Places.

The main block of the building is a wood-frame structure resting on a granite foundation, with a hip roof clad in asphalt shingles. Its front and rear facades are slightly elongated, giving the building a roughly rectangular shape. It is clad in wooden clapboards, and has a single brick chimney rising at the rear of the building. A gable-roof entry vestibule projects from the main block, with the door sheltered by a gabled portico supported by decorative brackets.

The library is open four days per week, and offers internet access, wifi, and access to a variety of online databases.

== See also ==
- National Register of Historic Places listings in Oxford County, Maine
