= Île-de-France (disambiguation) =

Île-de-France (or Isle de France in Old French and Middle French) is a region in France centred on Paris.

Île-de-France or Île de France may also refer to:

== Places ==
- Île-de-France (Greenland), an uninhabited island of the Greenland Sea, Greenland
- Isle de France (Mauritius), Mauritius under French rule between 1715 and 1810 as Isle de France
- Île-de-France (European Parliament constituency)
- Île-de-France, a public square in Paris on the Île de la Cité
- Ile-de-France, a sector of Planoise, Besançon, France

== Other uses ==
- SS Île de France, a French ocean liner
- Île-de-France (sheep), a breed of sheep
- Île-de-France, a sculpture by Aristide Maillol
- Île de France (train)

== See also ==
- List of islands of France
- French Island (disambiguation)
