= East Andover, Maine =

- Village
- Location within Maine
- Coordinates: 44°36′58″N 70°42′53″W
- Country: United States
- State: Maine
- County: Oxford
- Elevation: 689 ft (210 m)
- Time zone: UTC-5 (Eastern (EST))
  - Summer (DST): UTC-4 (EDT)
- ZIP code: 04226
- Area code: 207
- GNIS feature ID: 565511

East Andover is an unincorporated village in the town of Andover, Oxford County, Maine, United States. The community is 9.2 miles (14.8 km) northwest of Rumford. East Andover has a post office with ZIP code 04226.
