= Andover Elementary School =

Location
- 85 Pine Street; Maine; Andover, Maine, (Oxford County) 04216; United States
- Coordinates: 44.6322°N 70.7535°W

Information
- School type: Public, elementary school
- School district: Maine School Administrative District 44
- NCES District ID: 2311670
- Superintendent: Leanne Condon
- CEEB code: 160055
- NCES School ID: 231167000505
- Faculty: 4.70 (on an FTE basis)
- Grades: PK–5
- Enrollment: 36 (2020-2021 school year)
  - Kindergarten: 5 (+3 pk)
  - Grade 1: 6
  - Grade 2: 11
  - Grade 3: 5
  - Grade 4: 4
  - Grade 5: 2
- Student to teacher ratio: 1:3
- Language: English
- Campus: Rural
- Mascot: Eagle
- Communities served: Andover
- Website: andoverschooldepartment.org

Andover Elementary School is a small, public elementary school in Andover, Maine.

== Population ==
With an enrollment of only 36 students in pre-kindergarten through fifth grade, the student-teacher ratio is one of the best in the state of Maine. Andover Elementary is part of the Maine School Administrative District 44.
