= Andover Hook and Ladder Company Building =

- U.S. National Register of Historic Places
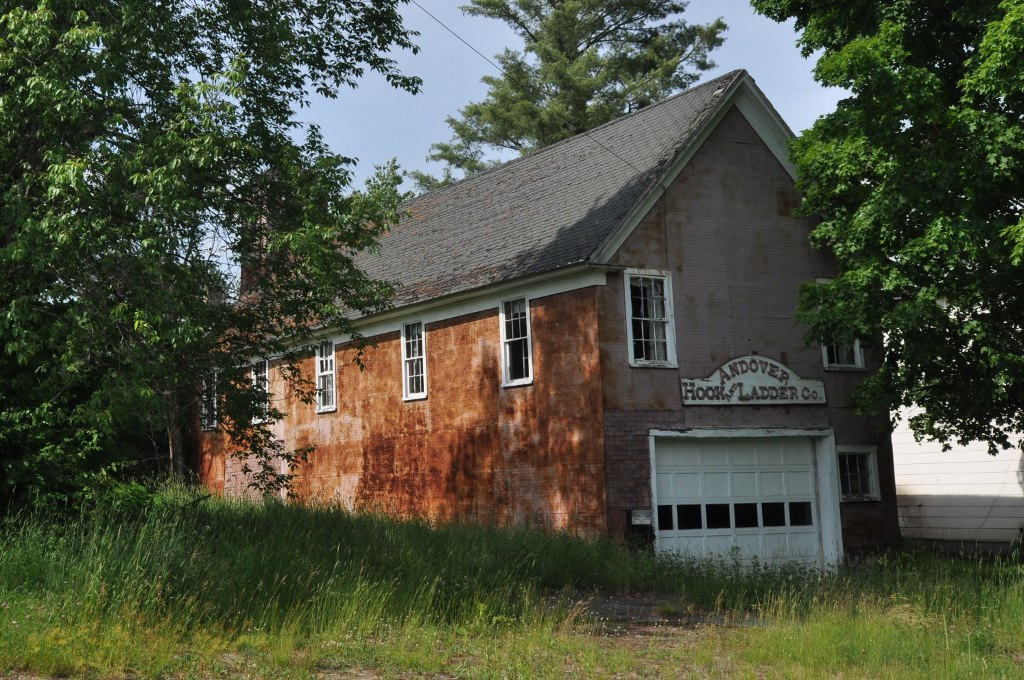

- Location within Maine Location within the United States
- Location: 39 Elm Street, Andover, Maine
- Coordinates: 44°38′10″N 70°44′59″W
- Area: less than one acre
- Built: 1904
- Architectural style: Late Victorian
- NRHP reference No.: 00001631
- Added to NRHP: January 11, 2001

The Andover Hook and Ladder Company Building is a historic fire station at 39 Elm Street in Andover, Maine. It is a long and narrow two-story wood-frame structure. Its front (southern) elevation has a large opening on the first floor closed by a modern garage door on the ground floor, with a small rectangular window to the right. Above this are two widely spaced sash windows. The side elevations each have five sash windows on the second floor; the east side also a single sash window on the first floor. The rear elevation has two sash windows flanking a hose tower that rises above the main, gabled roof. The building is clad in brick-patterned metal (tin) siding which appears to be original.

The ground floor of the interior is an open space whose walls are finished in fiberboard which is not original to the building's construction. The upper level is divided into three rooms, with a stairwell at the rear, rising through a portion of the hose tower. A stairway used to be located behind the front room, but only the partition and opening remain. These spaces retain original tongue-and-groove sheathing on the walls and ceiling.

The Andover Hook and Ladder Company was founded in 1890 to provide fire protection services for the small town. In 1904 an existing building, only a portion of the present one, was moved to this site, and the larger portion (approximately two-thirds) of this building was constructed. It was actively used as a fire station until 1987, and is now used for storage by the local historical society, and occasionally for community-related meetings. It is one of a relatively small number of rural fire stations to survive from the period in the state.

The building was listed on the National Register of Historic Places on January 11, 2001.

== See also ==
- National Register of Historic Places listings in Oxford County, Maine
