= Byron, Maine =

Town in Maine, United States

- Town
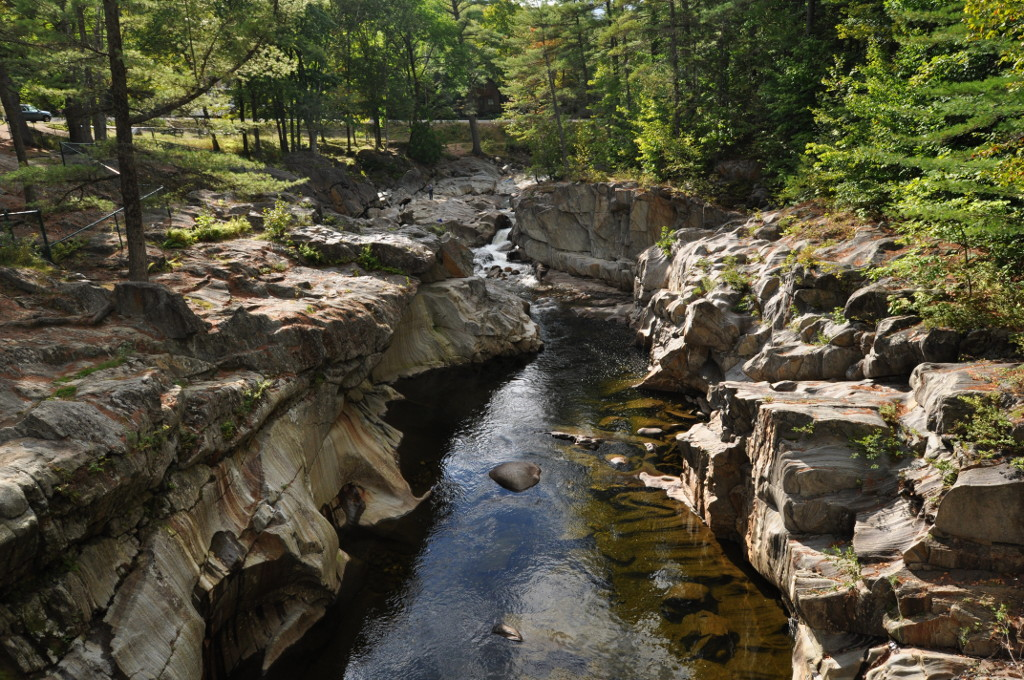
- Coos Canyon, in the center of Byron

- Location within Maine Location within the United States
- Coordinates: 44°45′07″N 70°39′35″W
- Country: United States
- State: Maine
- County: Oxford
- Incorporated: 1833

Area
  - Total: 52.56 sq mi (136.13 km^{2})
  - Land: 51.81 sq mi (134.19 km^{2})
  - Water: 0.75 sq mi (1.94 km^{2})
- Elevation: 1,125 ft (343 m)

Population (2020)
  - Total: 103
  - Density: 2.1/sq mi (0.8/km^{2})
- Time zone: UTC-5 (Eastern (EST))
  - Summer (DST): UTC-4 (EDT)
- ZIP code: 04275
- Area code: 207
- FIPS code: 23-09550
- GNIS feature ID: 582381

Byron is a town in Oxford County, Maine, United States. The population was 103 at the 2020 census. Home to Coos Canyon on the Swift River, Byron includes the village of Houghton.

== History ==
It was settled as Township No. 8, then incorporated on January 24, 1833, as Byron, named for the English poet Lord Byron. Nicknamed Hop City, agriculture was the principal occupation. Crops included wheat, corn, potatoes and oats. Lumbering was extensive in winter, with two sawmills operating. The Rumford Falls & Rangeley Lakes Railroad was completed in 1896, carrying freight, tourists and "rusticators" from Rumford up the Swift River valley through Byron and Houghton to Mooselookmeguntic Lake.

The Swift River is a popular place to either pan for gold or swim at Coos Canyon, a 32-foot (9.8-meter) high gorge where the water depth occasionally exceeds 20 feet (6.1 meters). Just down river from the gorge is a small local beach, called Toby's Beach. And a 20-foot ledge, popular during the summer, for daring jumpers.

There is a camping area off state route 17, across from Coos Canyon.

In March 2013, the town sought to require all homes in the town to possess at least one firearm, not unlike Kennesaw, Georgia's similar 1982-origin local ordinance.

== Geography ==
According to the United States Census Bureau, the town has a total area of 52.56 square miles (136.13 km^{2}), of which 51.81 square miles (134.19 km^{2}) is land and 0.75 square miles (1.94 km^{2}) is water. Set on either side of a narrow, uneven intervale in the Western Maine Mountains, Byron is drained by the Swift River.

The town is crossed by state route 17. It borders the towns of Roxbury to the south, Andover to the west, and unincorporated townships to the north and east.

== Demographics ==
Historical population
Census	Pop.	Note	%±
1840	219		—
1850	296		35.2%
1860	323		9.1%
1870	242		−25.1%
1880	191		−21.1%
1890	180		−5.8%
1900	204		13.3%
1910	187		−8.3%
1920	217		16.0%
1930	96		−55.8%
1940	125		30.2%
1950	96		−23.2%
1960	108		12.5%
1970	132		22.2%
1980	114		−13.6%
1990	111		−2.6%
2000	121		9.0%
2010	145		19.8%
2020	103		−29.0%
U.S. Decennial Census

=== 2010 census ===
As of the census of 2010, there were 145 people, 58 households, and 35 families living in the town. The population density was 2.8 inhabitants per square mile (1.1/km^{2}). There were 223 housing units at an average density of 4.3 per square mile (1.7/km^{2}). The racial makeup of the town was 95.9% White and 4.1% from two or more races. Hispanic or Latino of any race were 0.7% of the population.

There were 58 households, of which 29.3% had children under the age of 18 living with them, 53.4% were married couples living together, 1.7% had a female householder with no husband present, 5.2% had a male householder with no wife present, and 39.7% were non-families. 24.1% of all households were made up of individuals, and 10.4% had someone living alone who was 65 years of age or older. The average household size was 2.50 and the average family size was 3.11.

The median age in the town was 49.2 years. 25.5% of residents were under the age of 18; 2.1% were between the ages of 18 and 24; 15.1% were from 25 to 44; 42.7% were from 45 to 64; and 14.5% were 65 years of age or older. The gender makeup of the town was 55.2% male and 44.8% female.

=== 2000 census ===
As of the census of 2000, there were 121 people, 50 households, and 38 families living in the town. The population density was 2.3 inhabitants per square mile (0.89/km^{2}). There were 199 housing units at an average density of 3.8 per square mile (1.5/km^{2}). The racial makeup of the town was 95.87% White and 4.13% Asian.

There were 50 households, out of which 26.0% had children under the age of 18 living with them, 62.0% were married couples living together, 12.0% had a female householder with no husband present, and 24.0% were non-families. 18.0% of all households were made up of individuals, and 2.0% had someone living alone who was 65 years of age or older. The average household size was 2.42 and the average family size was 2.79.

In the town, the population was spread out, with 21.5% under the age of 18, 4.1% from 18 to 24, 28.9% from 25 to 44, 31.4% from 45 to 64, and 14.0% who were 65 years of age or older. The median age was 43 years. For every 100 females, there were 105.1 males. For every 100 females age 18 and over, there were 111.1 males.

The median income for a household in the town was $34,375, and the median income for a family was $34,375. Males had a median income of $41,875 versus $16,250 for females. The per capita income for the town was $20,334. There were 12.1% of families and 9.3% of the population living below the poverty line, including 14.3% of under eighteens and none of those over 64.

== Site of interest ==
- Coos Canyon
- Height of Land
- Tumbledown Mountain
- Angel Falls
- Ellis Pond
