= West Branch Ellis River =

Coordinates: 44.61701°N 70.73368°W

Location
- Country: United States

Physical characteristics
- Source
  - location: Maine

The West Branch Ellis River is a 13.5-mile-long (21.7 km) river in western Maine. It is a tributary of the Ellis River, which flows to the Androscoggin River and ultimately to the Kennebec River near its mouth at the Atlantic Ocean.

The West Branch rises north of Baldpate Mountain and flows east into the town of Andover, where it joins the main branch of the Ellis River southeast of the town center. For nearly its entire course it is followed by Upton Road, which connects Andover and Maine Route 5 with Maine Route 26 in the town of Upton.

== See also ==
- List of rivers of Maine
