= Merrill House (Maine) =

Historic house in Maine, United States

- U.S. National Register of Historic Places
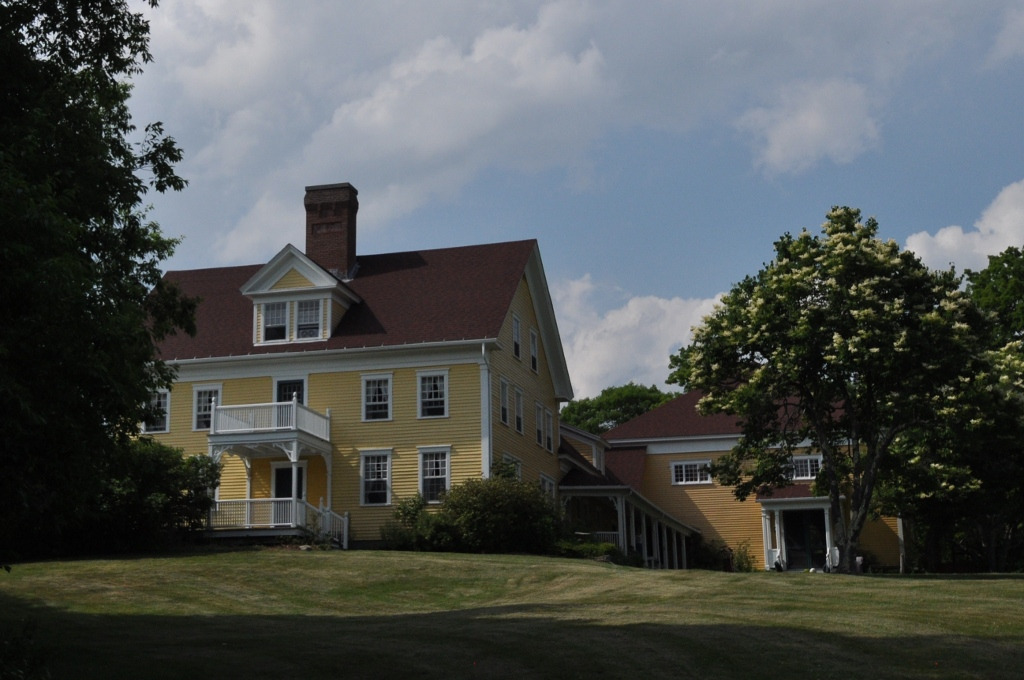

- Location within Maine Location within the United States
- Nearest city: Andover, Maine
- Coordinates: 44°38′9″N 70°44′19″W
- Area: 5 acres (2.0 ha)
- Built: 1791
- Architect: Multiple
- Architectural style: Colonial Revival, Colonial, Greek Revival
- NRHP reference No.: 76000106
- Added to NRHP: May 17, 1976

The Merrill House is a historic house and estate on Maine State Route 120 northeast of the village center of Andover, Maine. With construction dating to the late 1780s, the main house exemplifies the evolution of a frontier property. It is also significant as the birthplace of financier John A. Poor (1808-1871) and financial analyst Henry Varnum Poor (1812-1905), the latter of whom was responsible for its transformation into a summer estate in the late 19th century. The property was listed on the National Register of Historic Places.

== Description and history ==
The main portion of the Merrill House is a large 2 1/2-story wood-frame structure, resting on a granite foundation, with a hip roof and a large central chimney. This structure was built between 1788 and 1792 by Ezekiel Merrill, a veteran of the American Revolutionary War who had been granted the land for his service. The main facade is a five-bay center-entry configuration typical of the period, although it has been embellished with a Queen Anne portico. Merrill's construction originally had symmetrically placed twin chimneys; the change to a central chimney was part of the 1890s alterations.

Ezekiel Merrill's daughter Mary married Sylvanus Poor, and this couple inherited his property. Their children included Henry Varnum Poor (1812-1905), who started a firm that continues today as part of Standard and Poors, and John A. Poor (1808-1871), a lawyer and businessman who was instrumental in the development of the railroad in Maine, particularly the Grand Trunk Railway. Henry purchased the family homestead from relatives in 1890, and transformed the property into a summer estate, working in consultation with architect Edward Clarke Cabot and landscape designer Frederick Law Olmsted. Cabot's alterations to the main house included creation of a large dining room running the width of the rear of the house, and the construction of a maze of bedrooms in the second story, as well as the relocation of a service ell. The largest addition, however, was the construction of a great hall in 1896, a massive two-story structure built on the site of the old barn. Its interior feature Gothic woodwork in an open "lodge" space 30 feet (9.1 m) high at its apex.

The property continues to be owned by descendants of the Poor family.

== See also ==
- National Register of Historic Places listings in Oxford County, Maine
