= Merrill Estate =

Historic house in Massachusetts, United States

- U.S. National Register of Historic Places
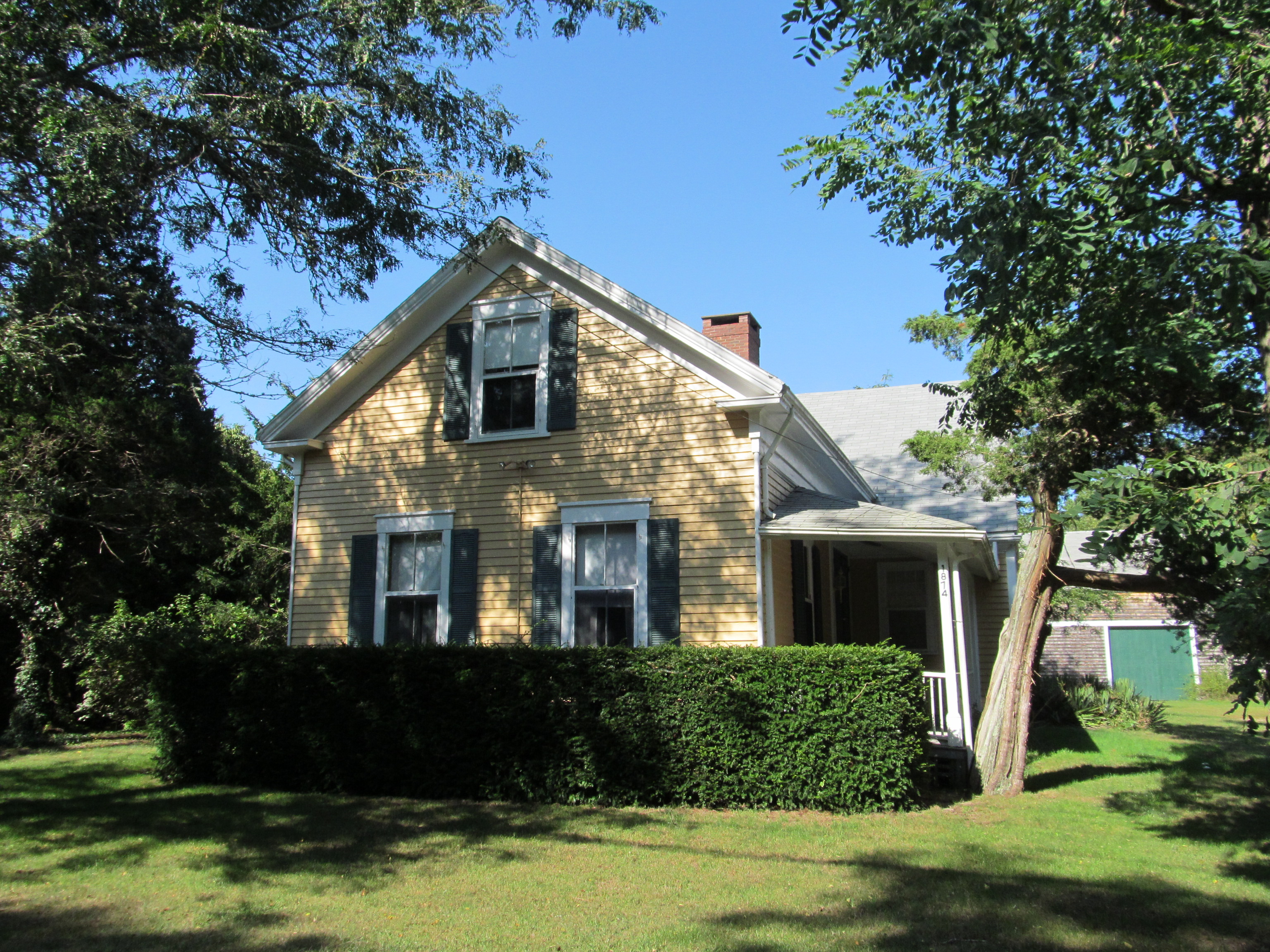

- Location within Cape Cod Location within Massachusetts Location within the United States
- Location: 1874 S. County Road, Barnstable, Massachusetts
- Coordinates: 41°39′6″N 70°24′11″W
- Area: 3 acres (1.2 ha)
- Built: 1750
- Architectural style: Greek Revival, Georgian
- MPS: Barnstable MRA
- NRHP reference No.: 87000268
- Added to NRHP: September 18, 1987

The Merrill Estate is a historic estate in the Marstons Mills section of Barnstable, Massachusetts. The estate house started as a 1 1/2-story Cape style house, with five bays and a large central chimney, built c. 1750–1775. This Georgian structure was extended in the middle of the 19th century with a 1 1/2-story Greek Revival ell that was added to the front of the house. The property includes an old English barn.

The early ownership history of this property is not none because a fire at the county courthouse in 1827 destroyed those records. The earliest surviving record records the sale of the house between two ship captains. William Sturgis, the buyer, was a noted local philanthropist, funding Barnstable's first library. The house was owned by members of the Merrill family as a summer estate from 1889.

The estate was listed on the National Register of Historic Places in 1987, cited as a well-preserved local example of a Georgian colonial house with Greek Revival alterations.

== See also ==
- National Register of Historic Places listings in Barnstable County, Massachusetts
