= Merrill-Maley House =

Historic house in Mississippi, United States

- U.S. National Register of Historic Places
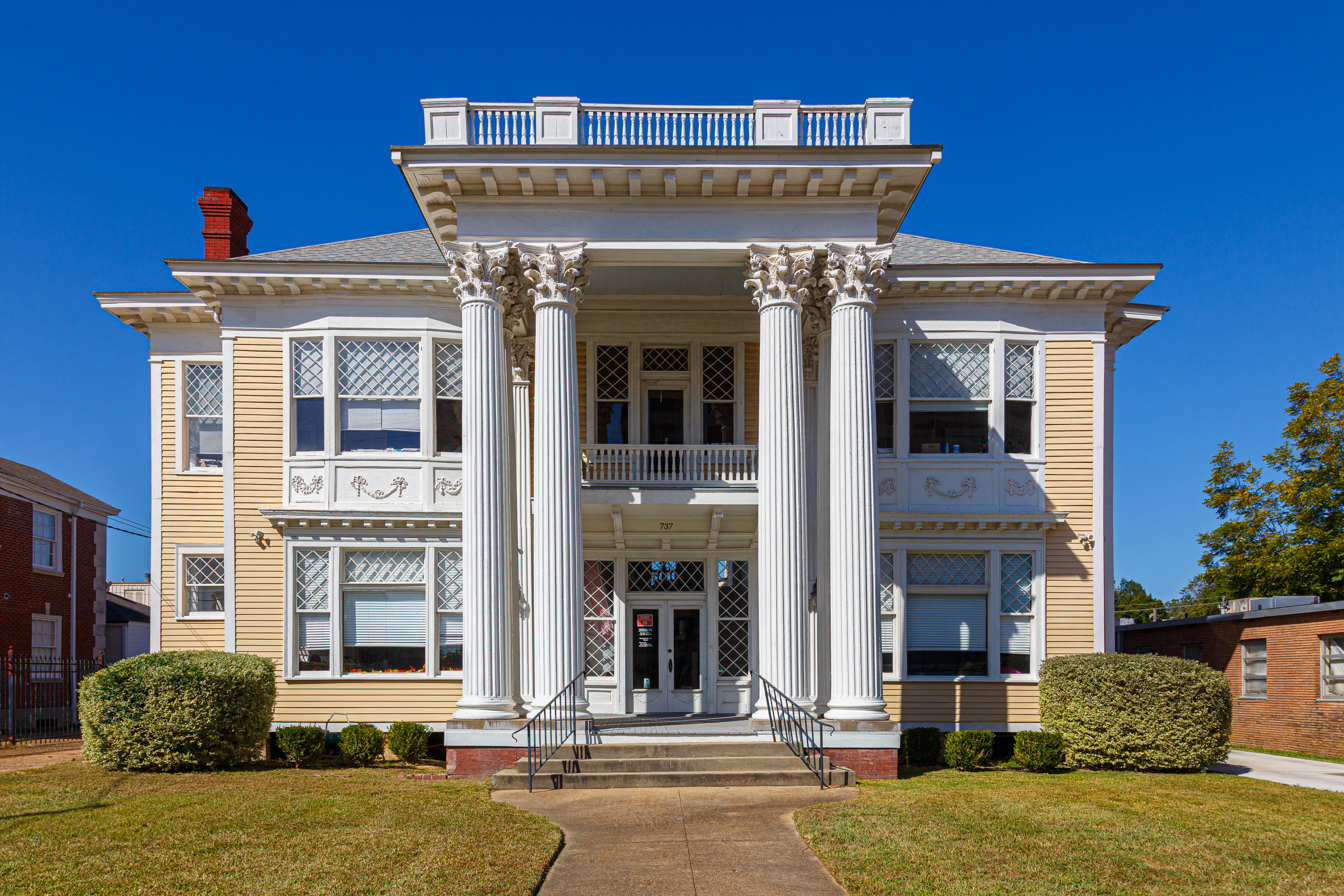
- The house in 2008

- Location within Mississippi Location within the United States
- Interactive map showing the location for Merrill-Maley House
- Location: 737 North State Street, Jackson, Mississippi
- Coordinates: 32°18′27″N 90°10′44″W
- Area: less than one acre
- Built: 1907
- Architectural style: Colonial Revival
- NRHP reference No.: 82003100
- Added to NRHP: April 29, 1982

Merrill-Maley House is a historic mansion in Jackson, Mississippi, U.S..

== History ==
The house was built in 1907 for Philip S. Merrill, the manager of the George B. Merrill & Sons Lumber Company. It was subsequently purchased by Charles E. Maley, a lumber. Later, it was purchased by Dr. W. F. Henderson and his wife, Lucille Henderson. In 1945, the house was remodeled into seven apartments.

The house was listed on the National Register of Historic Places in 1982.

The house had been vacant and neglected for over a decade when a contractor bought and restored it in 2014-2016. The building has since operated as an independent living facility.
