= Merrill House (Arkansas) =

Historic house in Arkansas, United States

- U.S. National Register of Historic Places
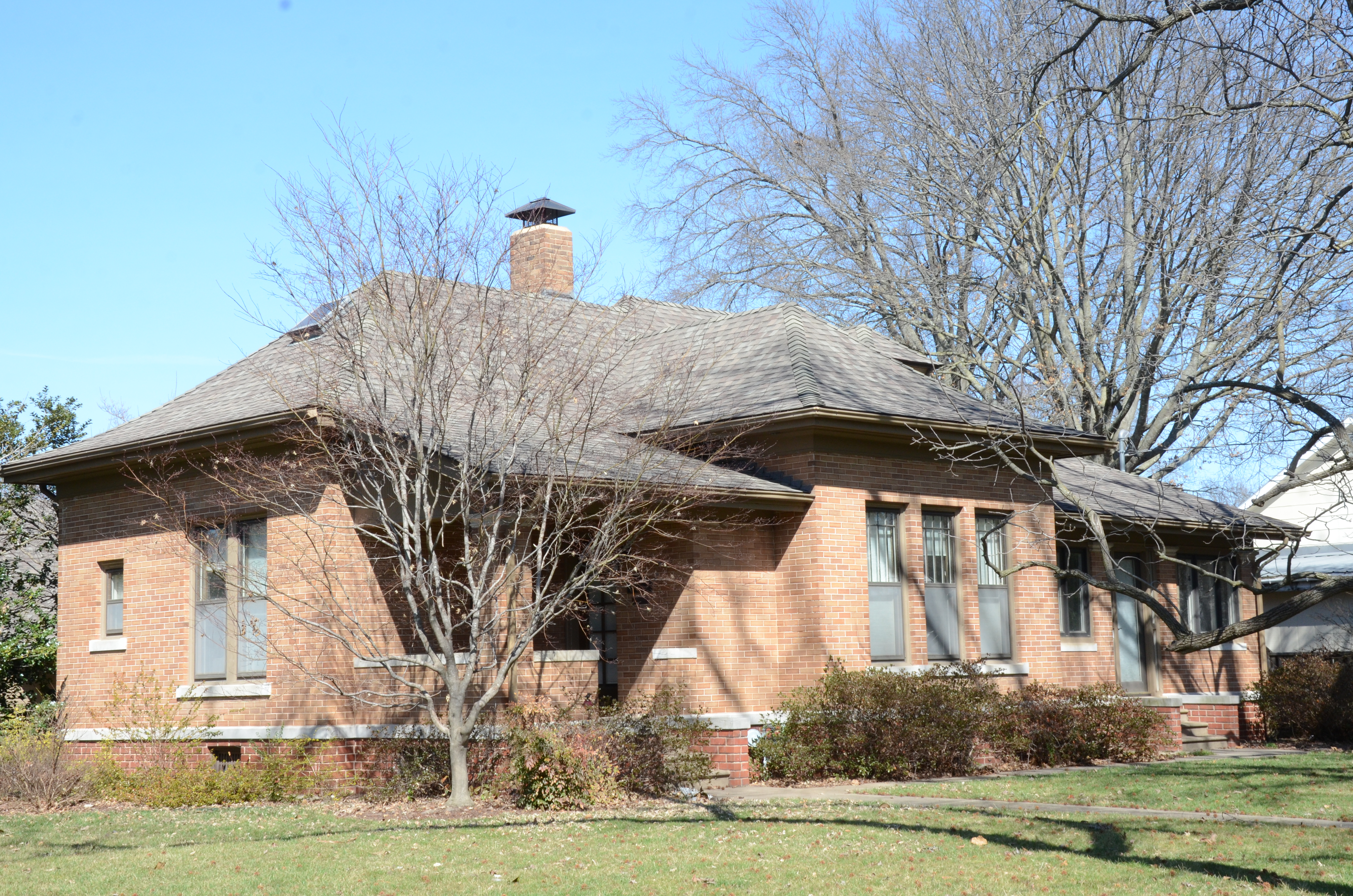

- Location within Arkansas Location within the United States
- Location: 617 S. Sixth, Rogers, Arkansas
- Coordinates: 36°19′42″N 94°7′22″W
- Area: less than one acre
- Built: 1917
- Architect: A.W. Merrill, John Myler
- Architectural style: Prairie School
- MPS: Benton County MRA
- NRHP reference No.: 87002404
- Added to NRHP: January 28, 1988

The Merrill House is a historic house at 617 South Sixth Street in Rogers, Arkansas. It is a single-story brick and masonry structure, with a hip roof that has a bell-cast shape and wide overhangs. A central projecting section has a grouping of three windows and is flanked on both sides by porches, one screened and one open. The arrangement of windows as well as the horizontal organization of stone and brickwork is all reminiscent of the Prairie School of Frank Lloyd Wright. The house, built in 1917, was a nearly complete rebuild of an older (c. 1880) house. Its designer and owner was A. W. Merrill, a local woodworker and lumber yard owner. It is the only Prairie School-influenced house in Rogers.

The house was listed on the National Register of Historic Places in 1988.

== See also ==
- National Register of Historic Places listings in Benton County, Arkansas
