= Samuel Merrill House =

Historic house in California, United States

- U.S. National Register of Historic Places
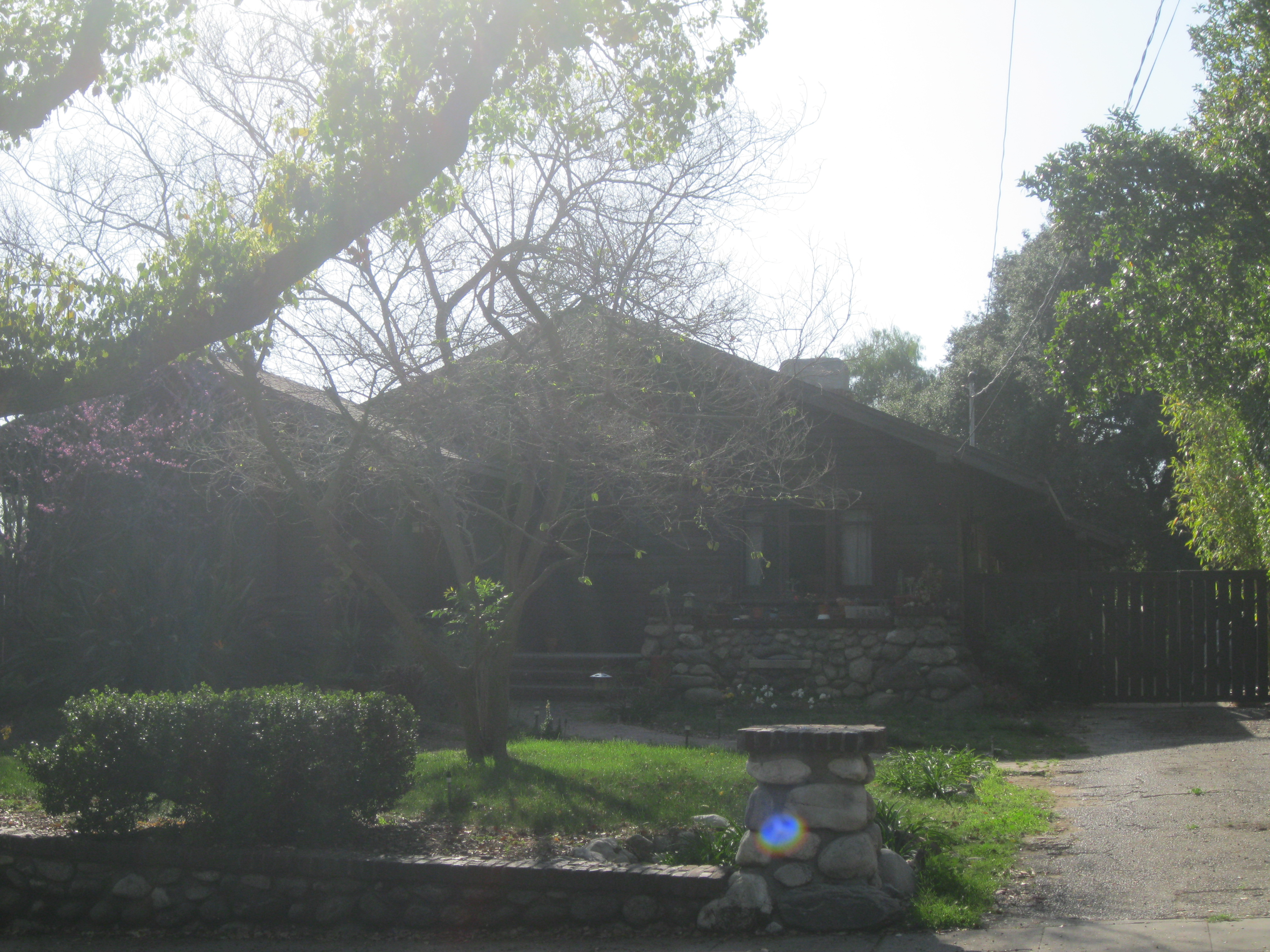

- Location within the Los Angeles metropolitan area Location within California Location within the United States
- Location: 1285 N. Summit Ave., Pasadena, California
- Coordinates: 34°10′5″N 118°8′53″W
- Area: less than one acre
- Built: 1910
- Architect: Greene & Greene
- Architectural style: American Craftsman
- MPS: Residential Architecture of Pasadena: Influence of the Arts and Crafts Movement
- NRHP reference No.: 01000330
- Added to NRHP: April 5, 2001

The Samuel Merrill House is a historic house located at 1285 N. Summit Ave. in Pasadena, California. Noted Pasadena architects Charles and Henry Greene designed the American Craftsman style house, which was built for conservationist Samuel Merrill in 1910. The single-story, L-shaped house is built from redwood and Arroyo stone, giving it a natural appearance; it also uses clinker brick for decoration. The house's gable roof features overhanging eaves and exposed rafter tails, characteristic features of Craftsman design. Several pairs of banded casement windows, many with wooden frames, are located throughout the facade. The house is considered one of the best-preserved small houses designed by Greene & Greene.

The house was added to the National Register of Historic Places on April 5, 2001.
