= Levi Merrill House =

Historic house in Wisconsin, United States

- U.S. National Register of Historic Places
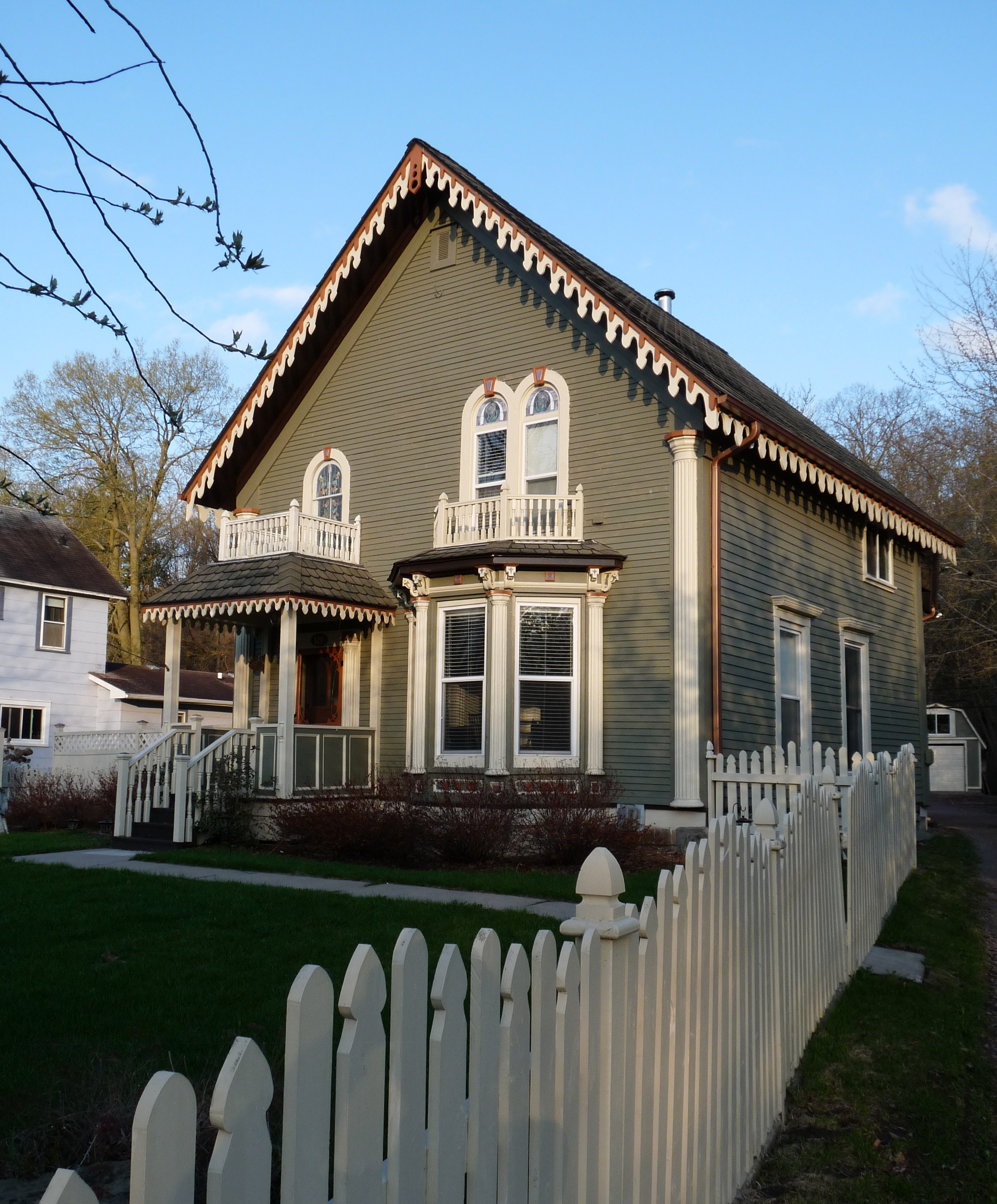
- Levi Merrill House
- Location: 120 Ferry St., Eau Claire, Wisconsin
- Coordinates: 44°47′54″N 91°32′05″W
- Area: less than one acre
- Built: 1873
- Architectural style: Classical Revival, Gothic Revival
- MPS: Eau Claire MRA
- NRHP reference No.: 85001358
- Added to NRHP: June 20, 1985

The Levi Merrill House is located in Eau Claire, Wisconsin.

== History ==
Levi Merrill was a stonemason who owned the Mount Washington stone quarry, up the bluff behind the house. The house was listed on the National Register of Historic Places in 1985 and on the State Register of Historic Places in 1989.
