= Captain Reuel and Lucy Merrill House =

Historic house in Maine, United States

- U.S. National Register of Historic Places
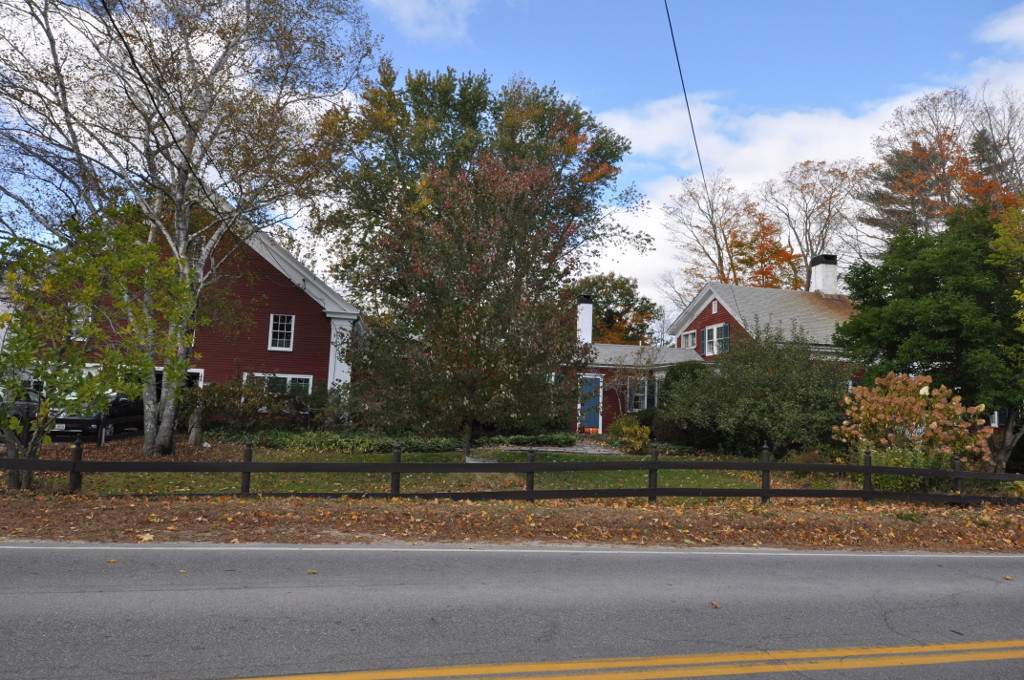

- Location within Maine Location within the United States
- Location: 66 Winn Rd., Cumberland Center, Maine
- Coordinates: 43°46′46″N 70°15′34″W
- Area: 37.8 acres (15.3 ha)
- Built: 1835
- Architectural style: Greek Revival
- NRHP reference No.: 99000378
- Added to NRHP: April 14, 1999

The Captain Reuel and Lucy Merrill House is a historic house at 66 Winn Road in Cumberland Center, Maine. Built in 1835, it is a well-preserved example of a connected New England farmstead with Greek Revival style. It was listed on the National Register of Historic Places in 1999.

== Description and history ==
The Merrill House stands in a rural area of southern Cumberland, on the northwest side of Winn Road between Range Road and Maine State Route 9. It consists of a 1 1/2-story Cape style house, connected via a single-story ell to a barn, stretching along the road. The main house is five bays wide, with a central entrance that is flanked by sidelight windows and pilasters, and is topped by a broad entablature. An enclosed porch extends to the right, while the ell to the left also has five bays, with a secondary entrance at the far right. The barn is 2 1/2 stories in height, and has Greek Revival pilasters, entablature, and gable end returns.

The house was built in 1835 for Captain Reuel Merrill, a ship's captain who served in the Union Navy during the American Civil War. Although the structure is mostly vernacular in style, its Greek Revival elements illustrate how rural builders applied current fashions. The main doorway, for example, is a near direct rendition of one depicted in Asher Benjamin's The Practical House Carpenter, a popular design book published in 1830.

== See also ==
- National Register of Historic Places listings in Cumberland County, Maine
