= Harry Merrill House =

Historic house in Minnesota, United States

- U.S. National Register of Historic Places
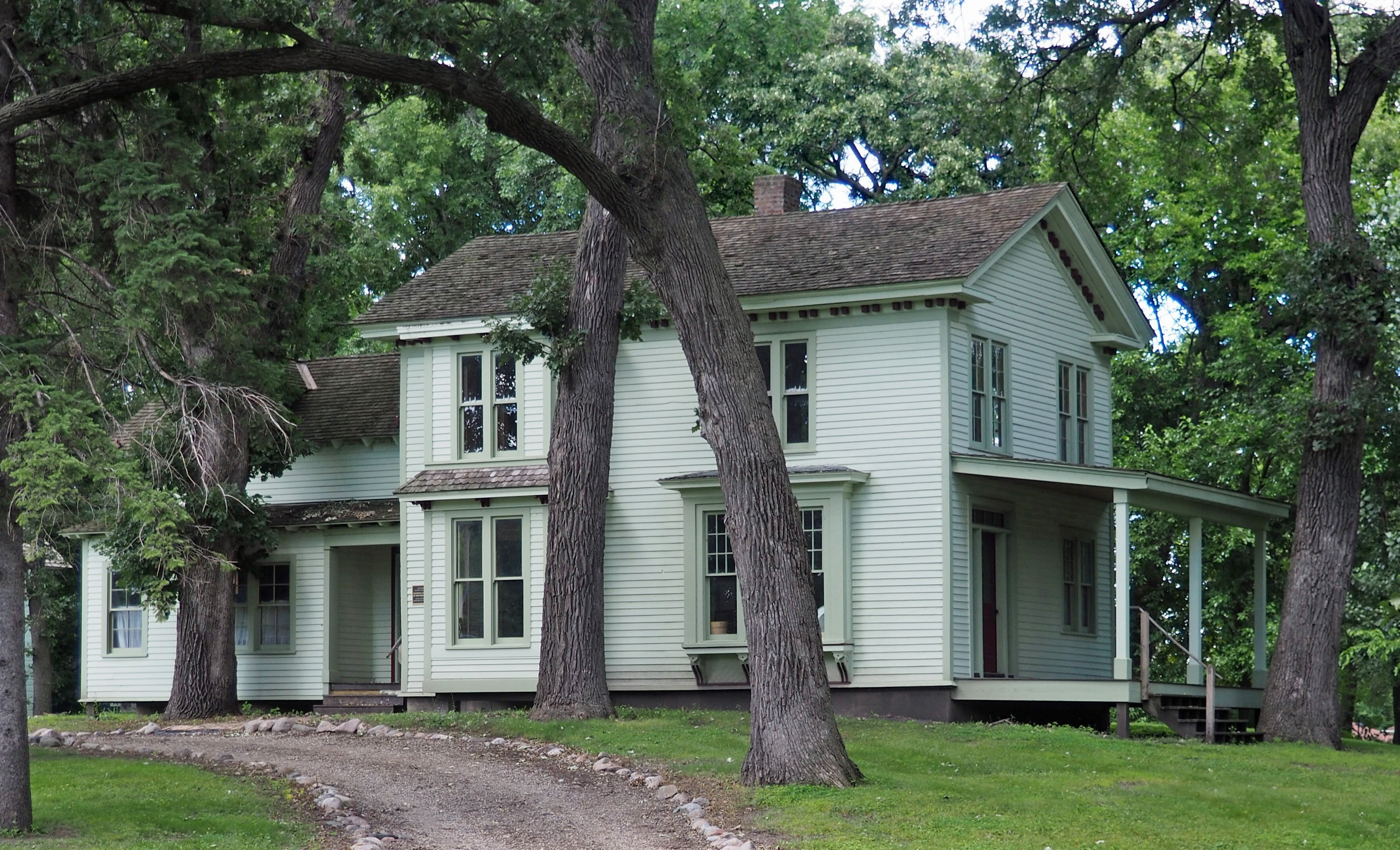
- The Harry Merrill House from the southeast

- Location within Minnesota Location within the United States
- Location: 225 Washington Street West, Hutchinson, Minnesota
- Coordinates: 44°53′34″N 94°22′23″W
- Area: 2 acres (0.81 ha)
- Built: 1858
- Architectural style: Greek Revival
- NRHP reference No.: 12000460
- Designated: August 1, 2012

The Harry Merrill House, also known as the Harrington–Merrill House, is a historic house in Hutchinson, Minnesota, United States. The house is the oldest wood-framed structure in Hutchinson and one of the oldest in McLeod County. It was built in 1858 by Lewis Harrington, then occupied 1886 to 1932 by Harry Merrill, who served as superintendent of local schools for 33 years. The house was listed on the National Register of Historic Places in 2012 for its local significance in the theme of education. It was nominated for its association with Harry Merrill, arguably the single most important educator in Hutchinson's history.

== Lewis Harrington ==
The Merrill House was completed in 1858 by one of Hutchinson's founders, Lewis Harrington. Harrington came to Minnesota in 1855, where he met the Hutchinson brothers John, Asa, and Judson. Along with other investors, they formed the Hutchinson Company. The company selected the town site of Hutchinson in November 1855. Harrington played a central role in the new town. He surveyed and built roads, and was the city's first postmaster. He married Ellen Pendergast in 1857. With a child on the way, the couple decided to build a new home. The new house was built in what was called "the grove". The house was two stories, built in the Greek Revival style. Key architectural elements were a front gabled entrance and a one-story, shed-roof entry porch.

During the Dakota War of 1862 the town was attacked by Dakota Indians. Hutchinson residents erected a stockade around the center of town and chose Lewis Harrington as their captain. His house was located outside the stockade. Many structures were burned to the ground, but the Harringtons' home survived. Harrington continued to work as a surveyor and an engineer, and later served in the state legislature. He died in 1884.

== Harry Merrill ==
Harry Merrill came to Hutchinson in 1882 to serve as school superintendent. He married Lewis Harrington's daughter Martha in 1886. The couple moved into the house with Martha's mother, Ellen.

The building was altered to reflect the new architectural fashions. A two-story bay window and one-story box bay window were added on the south elevation. A one-story summer kitchen wing was added to the west side of the house as well. Various other alterations also occurred in the years between 1890 and 1915, including the addition of a screened pavilion on the south and a bedroom on the north. On the spacious grounds, trees and a garden were planted. The Merrills used the home for school functions, and often took in students who worked for room and board.

Merrill had a substantial impact on his adopted hometown, holding the post of superintendent for 33 years. In a farm-oriented community, his most important task might have been to get students to attend. He oversaw the implementation of several laws regarding state education. In 1909, when the state authorized vocational education, Merrill began agriculture, manual training, and domestic classes in Hutchinson.

Beginning in 1912 Merrill initiated a normal school in association with the high school. It was the only such school in McLeod County, and for more than two decades many of its graduates staffed rural schools in the surrounding area. A measure of Merrill's influence on education is seen in the respect that he earned within the profession, evidenced by his time as president of the Minnesota Education Association in 1914–1915.

Merrill was also a civic leader in Hutchinson. He held the post of city councilor and sat on the city's first library board. He was president of the city's Electric Light Company and commercial club. In addition to teaching, Merrill enjoyed farming and planted an apple orchard near his home. He died in 1932 and was followed by his wife Martha in 1935.

== Later history ==
The next owner of the house was the Merrills' son Lewis, who was a civil engineer. He served as Hutchinson city engineer and McLeod County surveyor. Lewis Merrill brought new tastes to the house after World War I. The bays lost their Victorian detailing and the two-story bay became a one-story entry. The summer kitchen was removed and the porch portion of the kitchen wing was again altered and a second dormer window added.

After Lewis's death in 1970, the house fell into disrepair. In 2002 a fire destroyed the kitchen wing and severely damaged the interior of the rest of the house. The property was acquired by the city of Hutchinson late in 2003. The city's park system managed the building, and a local committee began supervising its upkeep and interpretation.

== See also ==
- National Register of Historic Places listings in McLeod County
