= Roxbury, Maine =

Town in Maine, United States

- Town
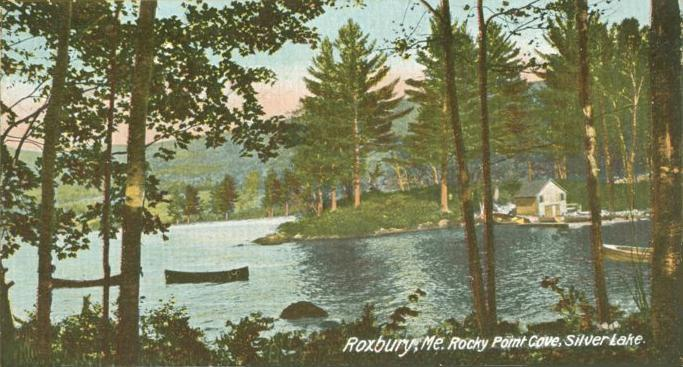
- Ellis Pond in 1906

- Location within Maine Location within the United States
- Coordinates: 44°38′08″N 70°36′52″W
- Country: United States
- State: Maine
- County: Oxford
- Incorporated: 1835

Area
  - Total: 44.13 sq mi (114.30 km^{2})
  - Land: 42.91 sq mi (111.14 km^{2})
  - Water: 1.22 sq mi (3.16 km^{2})
- Elevation: 833 ft (254 m)

Population (2020)
  - Total: 361
  - Density: 8.3/sq mi (3.2/km^{2})
- Time zone: UTC-5 (Eastern (EST))
  - Summer (DST): UTC-4 (EDT)
- ZIP code: 04275
- Area code: 207
- FIPS code: 23-64185
- GNIS feature ID: 582702
- Website: www.roxburymaine.com

Roxbury is a town in Oxford County, Maine, United States. The population was 361 at the 2020 census. Ellis Pond is popular with recreational fishermen.

== History ==
Originally known as Township No. 7, it was first settled about 1809. It was incorporated as a town on March 17, 1835, and named after Roxbury, Massachusetts. Farmers grew hay and raised livestock. Set on an intervale surrounded by the Western Maine Mountains, Roxbury was noted in the 19th century for abundant forests and mineral deposits. The Swift River falls provided water power for watermills, and industries included a sawmill, gristmill, shingle mill and shoe factory. In 1837, the population was 182. By 1859, it had grown to 246. The Rumford Falls & Rangeley Lakes Railroad was completed in 1896, carrying freight, tourists and "rusticators" up the Swift River valley through Roxbury to Mooselookmeguntic Lake.

== Geography ==
According to the United States Census Bureau, the town has a total area of 44.13 square miles (114.30 km^{2}), of which 42.91 square miles (111.14 km^{2}) is land and 1.22 square miles (3.16 km^{2}) is water. Roxbury is drained by the Swift River, a tributary of the Androscoggin River. Ellis Pond (also called Roxbury Pond or Silver Lake, a part of which lies in Byron) is to the northwest.

The town is crossed by state routes 17 and 120. It borders the towns of Byron to the northwest, Andover to the southwest, and Rumford, Mexico and Carthage to the south.

== Demographics ==
Historical population
Census	Pop.	Note	%±
1830	122		—
1840	227		86.1%
1850	246		8.4%
1860	251		2.0%
1870	162		−35.5%
1880	175		8.0%
1890	222		26.9%
1900	238		7.2%
1910	311		30.7%
1920	276		−11.3%
1930	314		13.8%
1940	346		10.2%
1950	348		0.6%
1960	344		−1.1%
1970	271		−21.2%
1980	373		37.6%
1990	437		17.2%
2000	384		−12.1%
2010	369		−3.9%
2020	361		−2.2%
U.S. Decennial Census

=== 2010 census ===
As of the census of 2010, there were 369 people, 181 households, and 113 families living in the town. The population density was 8.6 inhabitants per square mile (3.3/km^{2}). There were 430 housing units at an average density of 10.0 per square mile (3.9/km^{2}). The racial makeup of the town was 98.9% White, 0.5% Native American, 0.3% Pacific Islander, and 0.3% from two or more races.

There were 181 households, of which 13.8% had children under the age of 18 living with them, 50.3% were married couples living together, 4.4% had a female householder with no husband present, 7.7% had a male householder with no wife present, and 37.6% were non-families. 31.5% of all households were made up of individuals, and 11% had someone living alone who was 65 years of age or older. The average household size was 2.04 and the average family size was 2.45.

The median age in the town was 52.9 years. 11.7% of residents were under the age of 18; 5.1% were between the ages of 18 and 24; 13.8% were from 25 to 44; 47.1% were from 45 to 64; and 22.2% were 65 years of age or older. The gender makeup of the town was 53.1% male and 46.9% female.

=== 2000 census ===
As of the census of 2000, there were 384 people, 165 households, and 119 families living in the town. The population density was 9.0 people per square mile (3.5/km^{2}). There were 457 housing units at an average density of 10.7 per square mile (4.1/km^{2}). The racial makeup of the town was 99.48% White, 0.26% Native American and 0.26% Pacific Islander.

There were 165 households, out of which 26.7% had children under the age of 18 living with them, 60.6% were married couples living together, 6.1% had a female householder with no husband present, and 27.3% were non-families. 23.0% of all households were made up of individuals, and 7.3% had someone living alone who was 65 years of age or older. The average household size was 2.33 and the average family size was 2.67.

In the town, the population was spread out, with 20.1% under the age of 18, 2.9% from 18 to 24, 28.9% from 25 to 44, 30.7% from 45 to 64, and 17.4% who were 65 years of age or older. The median age was 44 years. For every 100 females, there were 116.9 males. For every 100 females age 18 and over, there were 106.0 males.

The median income for a household in the town was $41,750, and the median income for a family was $45,000. Males had a median income of $35,625 versus $21,346 for females. The per capita income for the town was $18,615. About 5.7% of families and 9.2% of the population were below the poverty line, including 7.0% of those under age 18 and 9.9% of those age 65 or over.
