= Andover, Maine =

Town in Maine, United States

- Town
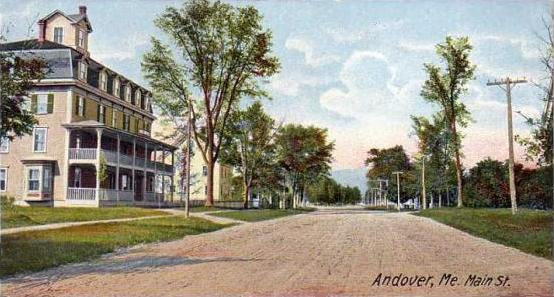
- Main Street c. 1906

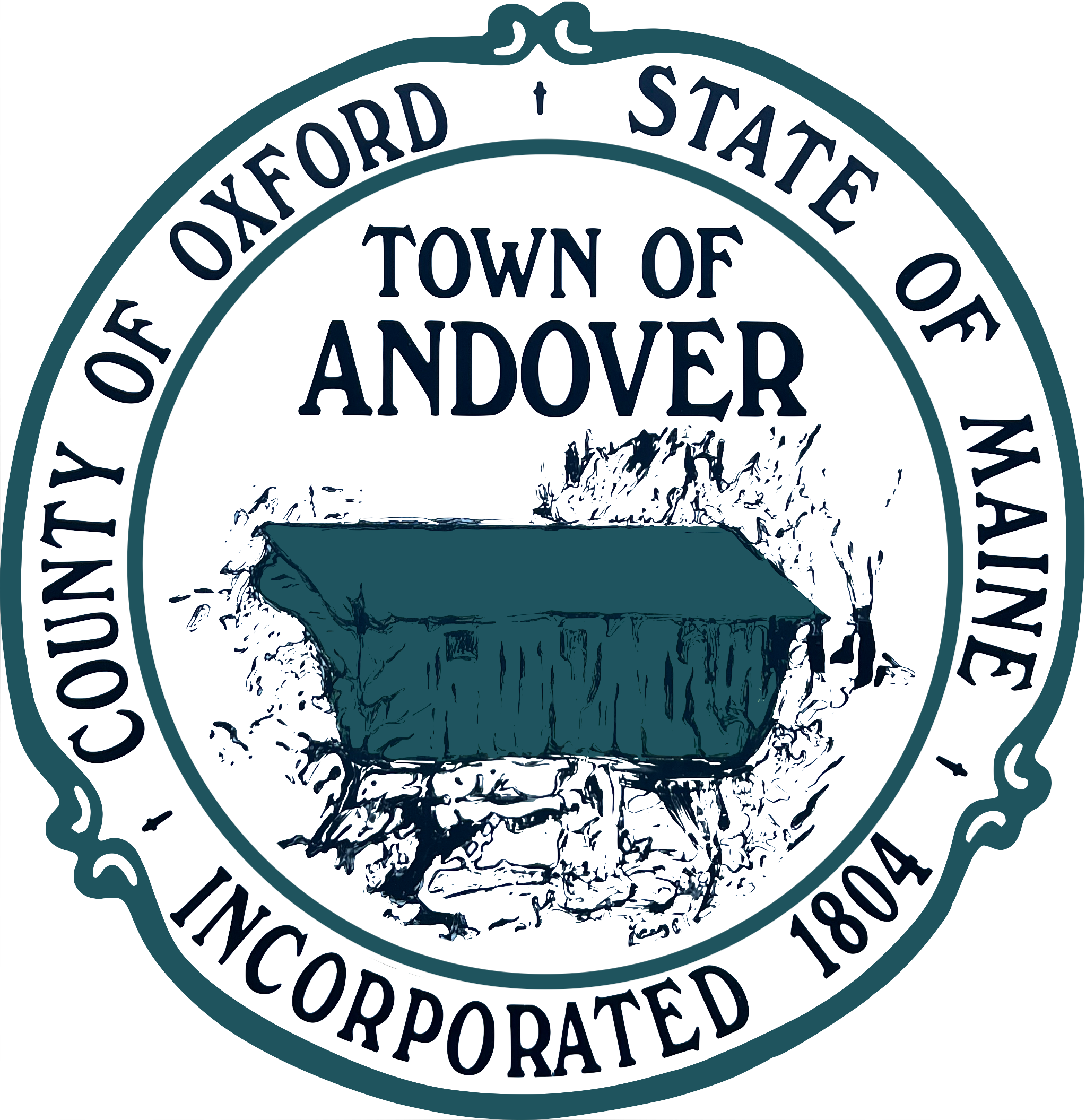
- Seal

- Location within the state of Maine Andover, Maine (the United States) Andover, Maine (North America)
- Coordinates: 44°38′03″N 70°45′19″W
- Country: United States
- State: Maine
- County: Oxford
- Incorporated: 1804

Area
  - Total: 57.46 sq mi (148.82 km^{2})
  - Land: 57.42 sq mi (148.72 km^{2})
  - Water: 0.039 sq mi (0.10 km^{2})
- Elevation: 689 ft (210 m)

Population (2020)
  - Total: 752
  - Density: 14/sq mi (5.5/km^{2})
- Time zone: UTC-5 (Eastern (EST))
  - Summer (DST): UTC-4 (EDT)
- ZIP Codes: 04216 (Andover); 04226 (East Andover)
- Area code: 207
- FIPS code: 23-01325
- GNIS feature ID: 582325
- Website: www.andovermaine.gov

Andover is a town in Oxford County, Maine, United States. The population was 752 at the 2020 census. Set among mountains and crossed by the Appalachian Trail, Andover is home to the Lovejoy Covered Bridge and is the site of the Andover Earth Station.

== History ==
The land which became known as Andover was originally purchased in 1788 by a group of proprietors mostly from Andover, Massachusetts. The original proprietors were Jonathan Abbot, Philip Abbott, Ebenezer Adams, Ingalls Bragg, Samuel Farnum, Samuel Johnson, Abiel Lovejoy, Benjamin Poor, Eben Poor, Jr., and Theodore Stevens, all of Andover, Massachusetts; John York of Bethel, Massachusetts; Joseph Frye of Fryeburg, Massachusetts; and Josiah Bean, Ezekiel Merrill, and Thomas Poor of Methuen, Massachusetts. The town was first settled in 1789 by Ezekiel Merrill and his family who were transported there from Bethel, Maine, in canoes managed by members of the local Pequawket tribe. The first saw-mill was built on the East Branch of the Ellis River by Col. Thomas Poor in 1791 and was used to provide the lumber for the still standing Merrill-Poor House.

The town was incorporated on June 23, 1804, as East Andover, and then renamed Andover in 1820 when Maine separated from Massachusetts.

Occupations for early inhabitants primarily included agriculture and lumbering. As the town developed, local factories made doors, sash, blinds, starch, cheese, boots, shoes, edge-tools, carriages, and harness. The town also had a tannery. Located on an intervale surrounded by mountains, Andover is noted for "its grand and beautiful scenery," with streams abounding in trout. After the Civil War, the town became a popular destination for sportsmen, especially fishermen attracted by the nearby Richardson Lakes. A hotel was built to accommodate the influx of tourists.

In 1960, Andover was selected to be site of the Andover Earth Station, completed in 1962. It was the location of the first live transatlantic television signal broadcast by satellite Telstar 1.

== Geography ==
According to the United States Census Bureau, the town has a total area of 57.46 square miles (148.82 km^{2}), of which 57.42 square miles (148.72 km^{2}) is land and 0.04 square miles (0.10 km^{2}) is water. Crossed by the Appalachian Trail, Andover is drained by the Ellis River, a tributary of the Androscoggin River. The river is home to many fish and wildlife, from which avid hunters and fisherman try their luck.

The town is crossed by state routes 5 and 120. It borders the towns of Roxbury and Byron to the east, Rumford to the south, Newry to the southwest, Andover West Surplus to the west, and Andover North Surplus to the north.

=== Climate ===
This climatic region is typified by large seasonal temperature differences, with warm to hot (and often humid) summers and cold (sometimes severely cold) winters. According to the Köppen Climate Classification system, Andover has a humid continental climate, abbreviated "Dfb" on climate maps.

Climate data for Andover 2, Maine, 1991–2020 normals, extremes 2001–present: 822ft (251m)
Month	Jan	Feb	Mar	Apr	May	Jun	Jul	Aug	Sep	Oct	Nov	Dec	Year
Record high °F (°C)	54 (12)	68 (20)	77 (25)	89 (32)	92 (33)	95 (35)	97 (36)	94 (34)	94 (34)	83 (28)	75 (24)	59 (15)	97 (36)
Mean maximum °F (°C)	45.3 (7.4)	47.1 (8.4)	55.8 (13.2)	74.4 (23.6)	84.4 (29.1)	87.1 (30.6)	89.6 (32.0)	87.2 (30.7)	83.6 (28.7)	72.9 (22.7)	62.4 (16.9)	48.8 (9.3)	91.9 (33.3)
Mean daily maximum °F (°C)	24.4 (−4.2)	27.7 (−2.4)	36.5 (2.5)	49.9 (9.9)	64.2 (17.9)	72.3 (22.4)	77.3 (25.2)	76.6 (24.8)	68.5 (20.3)	54.8 (12.7)	42.1 (5.6)	30.3 (−0.9)	52.0 (11.1)
Daily mean °F (°C)	14.0 (−10.0)	15.7 (−9.1)	25.7 (−3.5)	38.4 (3.6)	51.5 (10.8)	60.4 (15.8)	65.6 (18.7)	64.0 (17.8)	56.3 (13.5)	44.1 (6.7)	33.1 (0.6)	21.4 (−5.9)	40.9 (4.9)
Mean daily minimum °F (°C)	3.5 (−15.8)	3.6 (−15.8)	14.8 (−9.6)	26.9 (−2.8)	38.8 (3.8)	48.5 (9.2)	53.9 (12.2)	51.3 (10.7)	44.1 (6.7)	33.4 (0.8)	24.0 (−4.4)	12.5 (−10.8)	29.6 (−1.3)
Mean minimum °F (°C)	−12.9 (−24.9)	−9.9 (−23.3)	−6.0 (−21.1)	17.2 (−8.2)	27.2 (−2.7)	37.3 (2.9)	43.6 (6.4)	40.6 (4.8)	29.7 (−1.3)	22.5 (−5.3)	9.8 (−12.3)	−5.1 (−20.6)	−14.9 (−26.1)
Record low °F (°C)	−30 (−34)	−20 (−29)	−16 (−27)	8 (−13)	23 (−5)	28 (−2)	39 (4)	35 (2)	26 (−3)	13 (−11)	0 (−18)	−17 (−27)	−30 (−34)
Average precipitation inches (mm)	3.41 (87)	2.71 (69)	3.48 (88)	4.54 (115)	4.37 (111)	5.38 (137)	4.75 (121)	4.33 (110)	4.02 (102)	5.88 (149)	4.48 (114)	4.28 (109)	51.63 (1,312)
Average snowfall inches (cm)	22.5 (57)	26.5 (67)	17.6 (45)	7.0 (18)	0.2 (0.51)	0.0 (0.0)	0.0 (0.0)	0.0 (0.0)	0.0 (0.0)	0.6 (1.5)	8.3 (21)	29.1 (74)	111.8 (284.01)
Average precipitation days (≥ 0.01 in)	11.2	9.4	9.1	11.3	14.3	14.7	11.8	12.1	9.0	13.0	11.4	13.5	140.8
Average snowy days (≥ 0.1 in)	9.3	8.1	6.0	2.6	0.1	0.0	0.0	0.0	0.0	0.5	3.8	9.7	40.1
Source 1: NOAA
Source 2: XMACIS (mean maxima/minima 2006–2020)

== Demographics ==
Historical population
Census	Pop.	Note	%±
1810	271		—
1820	368		35.8%
1830	399		8.4%
1840	551		38.1%
1850	710		28.9%
1860	814		14.6%
1870	757		−7.0%
1880	780		3.0%
1890	740		−5.1%
1900	727		−1.8%
1910	757		4.1%
1920	767		1.3%
1930	788		2.7%
1940	757		−3.9%
1950	756		−0.1%
1960	762		0.8%
1970	791		3.8%
1980	850		7.5%
1990	953		12.1%
2000	864		−9.3%
2010	821		−5.0%
2020	752		−8.4%
U.S. Decennial Census

=== 2010 census ===
As of the census of 2010, there were 821 people, 385 households, and 253 families living in the town. The population density was 14.3 inhabitants per square mile (5.5/km^{2}). There were 603 housing units at an average density of 10.5 per square mile (4.1/km^{2}). The racial makeup of the town was 98.8% White, 0.4% Native American, 0.4% Asian, and 0.5% from two or more races.

There were 385 households, of which 20.5% had children under the age of 18 living with them, 52.5% were married couples living together, 7.8% had a female householder with no husband present, 5.5% had a male householder with no wife present, and 34.3% were non-families. 28.3% of all households were made up of individuals, and 12.7% had someone living alone who was 65 years of age or older. The average household size was 2.13 and the average family size was 2.57.

The median age in the town was 51.1 years. 15.6% of residents were under the age of 18; 4.7% were between the ages of 18 and 24; 20.5% were from 25 to 44; 35.3% were from 45 to 64; and 23.9% were 65 years of age or older. The gender makeup of the town was 50.7% male and 49.3% female.

=== 2000 census ===
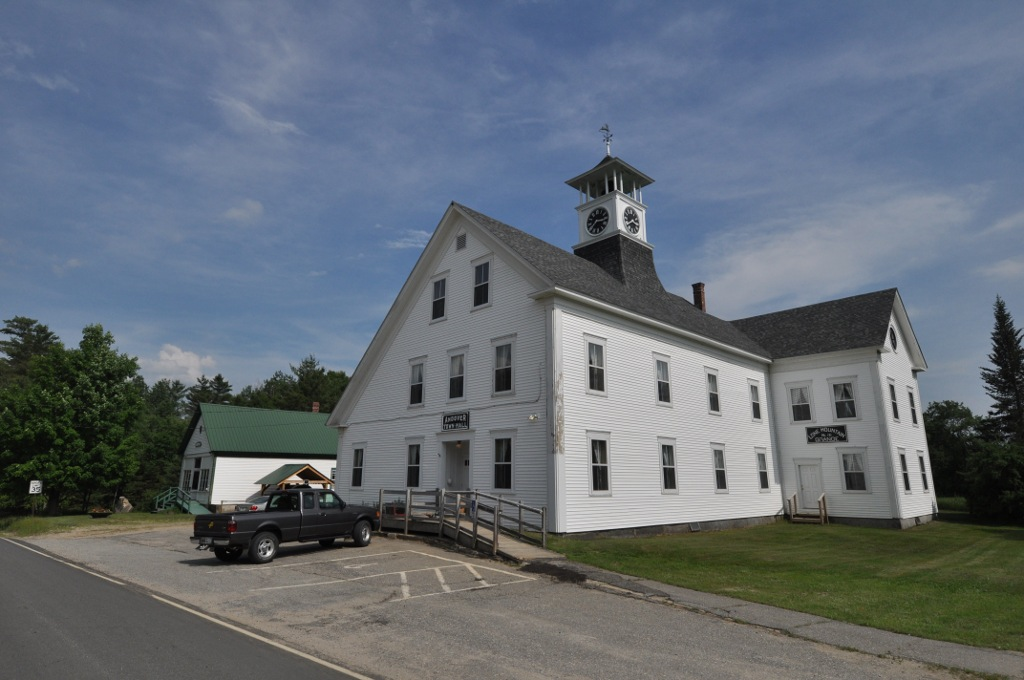
Town Hall

As of the census of 2000, there were 864 people, 359 households, and 257 families living in the town. The population density was 15.1 inhabitants per square mile (5.8/km^{2}). There were 553 housing units at an average density of 9.6 per square mile (3.7/km^{2}). The racial makeup of the town was 98.96% White, 0.46% African American, 0.12% Native American, 0.12% from other races, and 0.35% from two or more races. Hispanic or Latino of any race were 0.35% of the population.

There were 359 households, out of which 27.6% had children under the age of 18 living with them, 61.8% were married couples living together, 5.8% had a female householder with no husband present, and 28.4% were non-families. 23.4% of all households were made up of individuals, and 9.2% had someone living alone who was 65 years of age or older. The average household size was 2.41 and the average family size was 2.81.

In the town, the population was spread out, with 23.3% under the age of 18, 3.5% from 18 to 24, 28.0% from 25 to 44, 30.7% from 45 to 64, and 14.6% who were 65 years of age or older. The median age was 42 years. For every 100 females, there were 99.5 males. For every 100 females age 18 and over, there were 100.3 males.

The median income for a household in the town was $36,058, and the median income for a family was $40,855. Males had a median income of $32,031 versus $20,000 for females. The per capita income for the town was $20,253. About 9.0% of families and 12.2% of the population were below the poverty line, including 18.3% of those under age 18 and 13.3% of those age 65 or over.

== Sites of interest ==
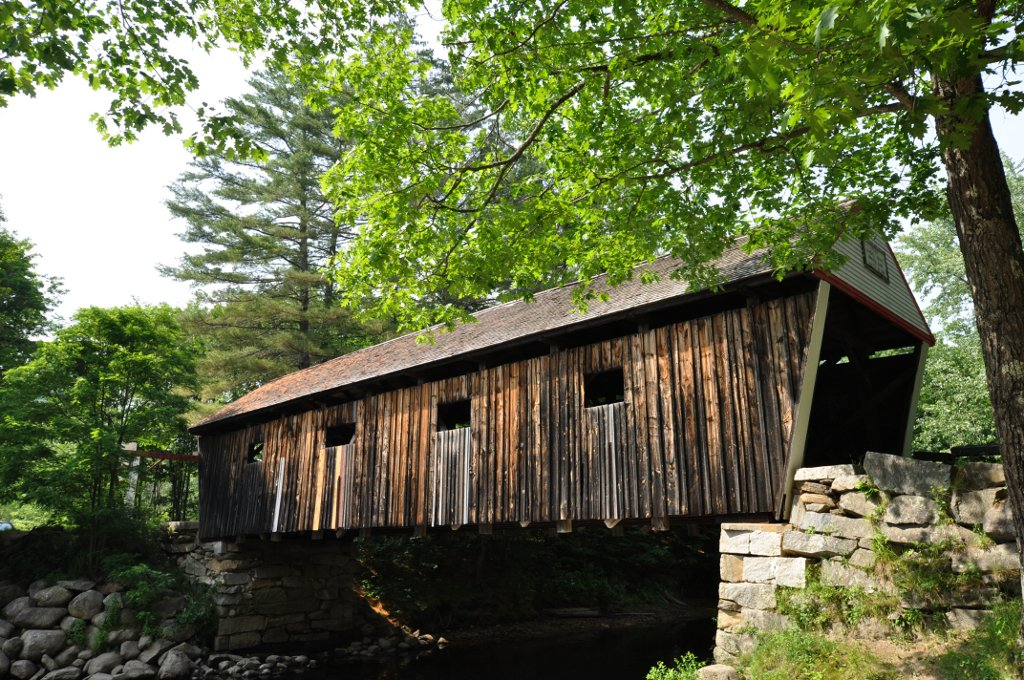
Lovejoy Covered Bridge

- Andover Earth Station
- Andover Elementary School
- Andover Hook and Ladder Company Building
- Andover Public Library
- East Andover
- Lovejoy Bridge
- Merrill-Poor House

== Notable people ==
- Charlie Akers, Olympic biathlete
- Robert W. Duplessie, politician
- John Orville Newton, principal and politician
- Molly Ockett, Abenaki healer
- Henry Varnum Poor, financial analyst
- John A. Poor, lawyer, editor, and entrepreneur
