= Telstar 1 =

Defunct Communications Satellite

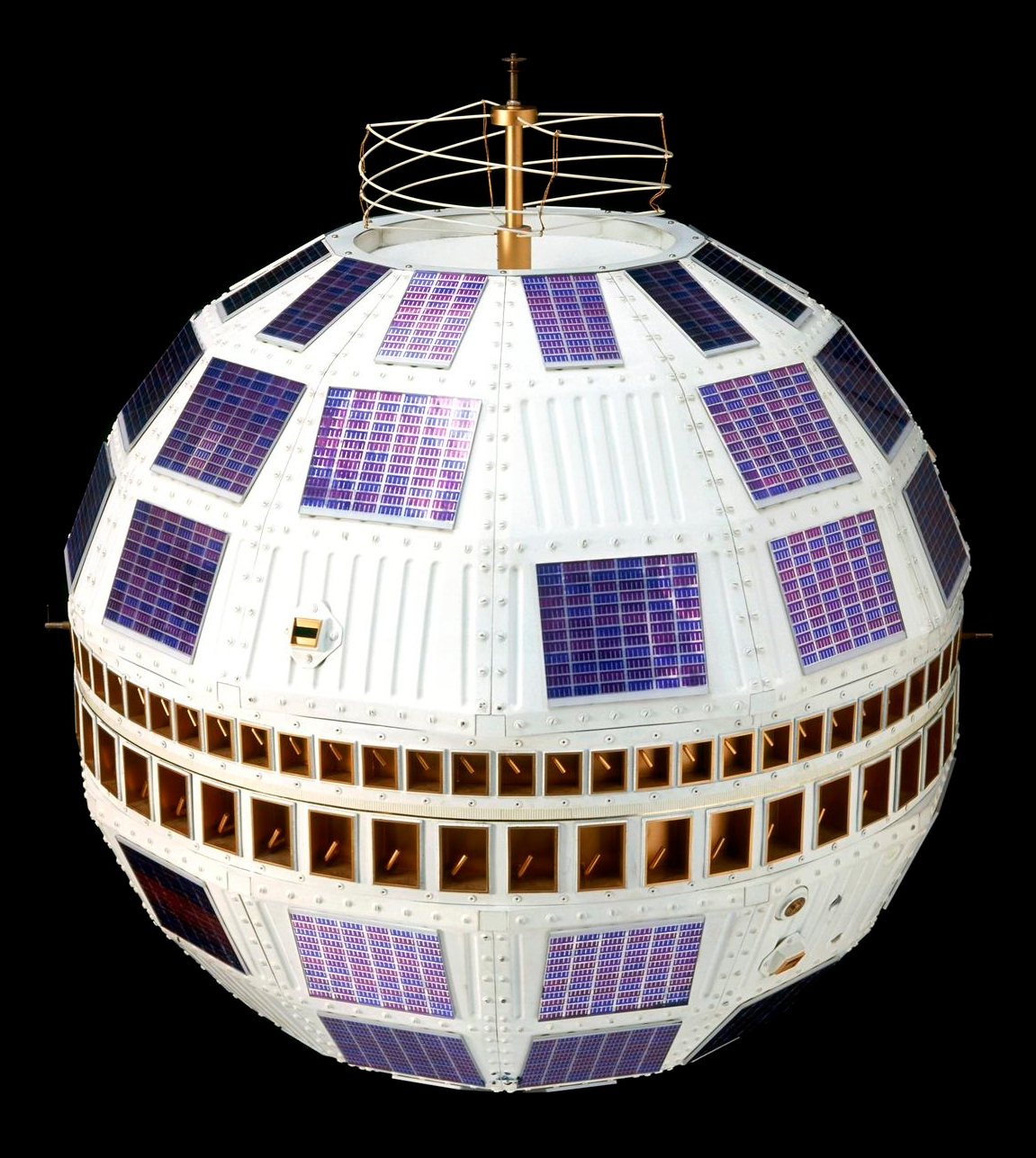
- The original Telstar had a roughly spherical shape.
- Operator: AT&T / NASA
- COSPAR ID: 1962-029A
- SATCAT no.: 340
- Mission duration: 64 years, 29 days (in orbit)

Spacecraft properties
- Manufacturer: Bell Labs
- Launch mass: 171 pounds (78 kg)

Start of mission
- Launch date: 08:35, 10 July 1962 (UTC)
- Rocket: Thor-Delta
- Launch site: Cape Canaveral LC-17B

End of mission
- Deactivated: 21 February 1963

Orbital parameters
- Reference system: Geocentric
- Regime: Medium Earth
- Perigee altitude: 952 kilometers (592 mi)
- Apogee altitude: 5,933 kilometers (3,687 mi)
- Inclination: 44.8°
- Period: 2 hours and 37 minutes
- Epoch: 1962-07-10 08:35:00 UTC

Universal newsreel about Telstar 1

External audio
- Felker Talking Telstar, 1962, Dr. Jean Felker's speech starts at 4:20, WNYC

Telstar 1 is a defunct communications satellite launched by NASA on July 10th, 1962. One of the earliest communications satellites, it was the first telecommunications satellite, achieving live transmission of broadcast television images between the United States and Europe. Telstar 1 remained active for only 7 months before it prematurely failed due to Starfish Prime, a high-altitude nuclear test conducted by the United States. Although the satellite is no longer operational, it remains in Earth orbit.

== History ==
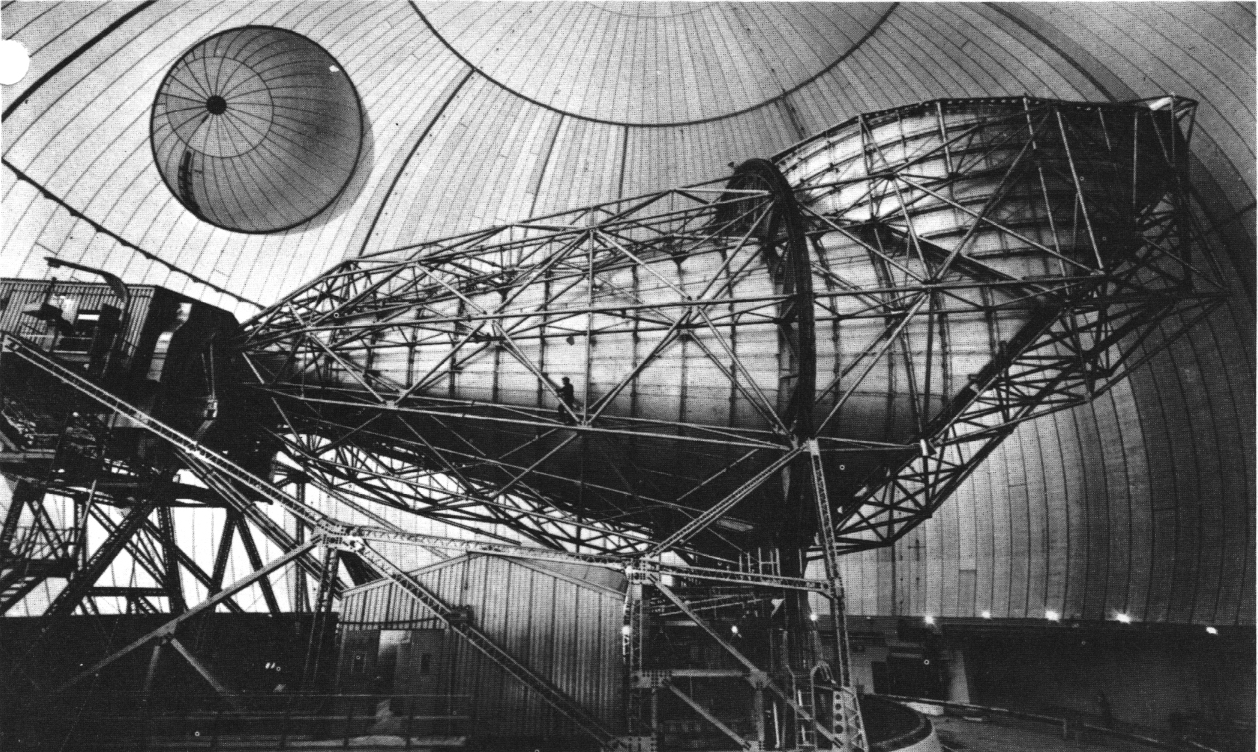
Huge horn antenna at the AT&T Andover satellite ground station at Andover, Maine

The idea of relaying information from one point on Earth to another by means of satellites was not new. As early as October 1945, the visionary Arthur C. Clarke published an article talking about it in the specialized magazine Wireless World. His idea was to enable communication between two points which were prevented from direct radio communication by the curve of the Earth, by relaying the information by radio through an orbiting satellite. During the Cold War, the shock caused by the successful launch of the first artificial satellite, Sputnik 1, by the Soviets increased the United States' interest in aerospace research. Soon thereafter, the Americans began their attempts to launch orbital communications satellites for transmitting telephone, radio, and television signals.

In December 1958, the United States successfully launched its first communications satellite, SCORE. Through it, then-President Dwight D. Eisenhower sent a Christmas message to the entire world. However, SCORE stayed in orbit for only a few months, its enormous surface area and very low Earth orbit forcing reentry after only 500 laps around the planet due to aerodynamic resistance. Also, SCORE relied on a passive reflector, which greatly reduced signal strength, since it did not amplify the signal before sending it back to earth.

The Telstar project represented a substantial financial investment to advance satellite communications technology. According to a memorandum dated 16 August 1962, the total expenditure for the Telstar experimental satellite project, as reported by AT&T to Senator Kerr, was approximately $50 million. This figure includes an initial estimate of $45 million as of April 19th, 1962, covering the costs of orbiting the Telstar satellite and establishing a fully operational ground station in Andover, Maine. Additional expenses incurred after this date increased the total project costs by $5 million, with the Andover facility alone costing around $10 million and another $4 million for necessary tie-in lines.

AT&T also reported that it had invested $1.4 billion in research and development for the essential components of the communications system, of which over $1 billion was directed towards technology closely related to satellite communications.

Specific launch costs were also covered by AT&T. On February 16th 1962, approximately five months before the July 10th launch, AT&T made an advance payment to NASA totaling $2,680,982.

== Launch ==
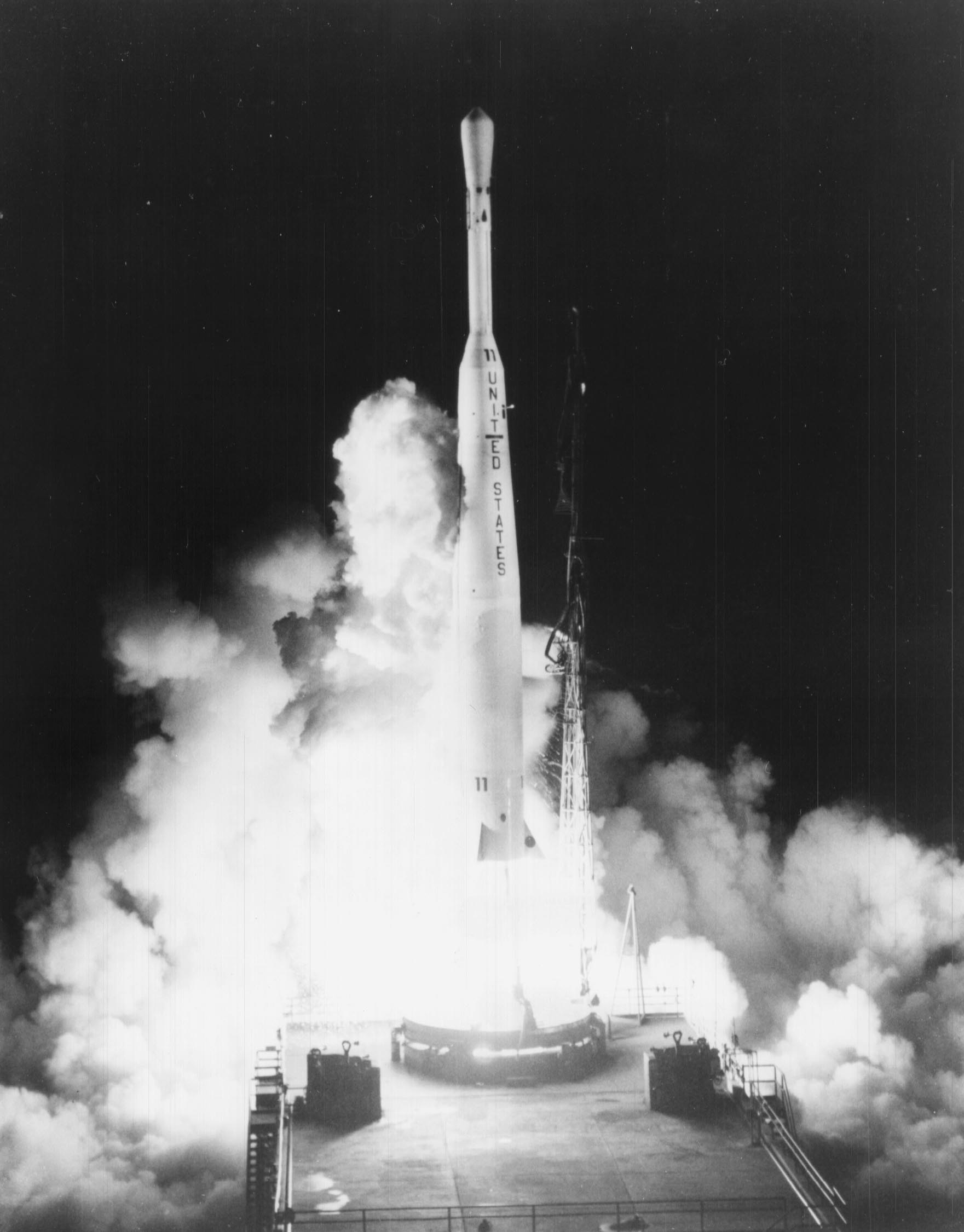
Launch of Telstar 1

Telstar 1 was launched on July 10th, 1962, from the Cape Canaveral Air Force Station, Florida, atop a Delta rocket. Spherical in shape, the satellite had a diameter of 88 centimetres (35 in) and weighed 77 kilograms (170 lb).

== Operations ==
The satellite had a transponder (receiver and transmitter) with a 50 MHz bandwidth that could relay a single television channel or a FDM signal containing multiple telephone calls or datastreams. The two rings of microwave cavities visible around the satellite's middle were the uplink and downlink antennas for the data signal. The satellite received the 6.39 GHz microwave uplink signal from the transmitting ground station through the upper ring of smaller cavities, and transmitted the 4.17 GHz downlink signal back to the receiving ground station through the lower ring of larger cavities. Since the transmitter was very weak, with a radiated power of only 14 watts, and the antenna array was omnidirectional, very large aperture antennas were required at the ground stations to communicate with it. The satellite also had a helical antenna at one end to receive control commands.

A 53-meter terrestrial antenna manufactured by AT&T Corporation, located in Andover, Maine, was used for the transmissions between the United States and Europe. Built in 1961, and used by Telstar 1, it was later used by Relay 1.

Telstar 1 operated normally from launch until November 1962 when the radiation from the Starfish Prime high altitude nuclear test detonation affected the command channel, which began to behave erratically. The satellite was continuously switched on to work around this problem. On November 23rd 1962, the command channel stopped responding. On December 20th, the satellite was successfully reactivated, and intermittent data were obtained until February 21st, 1963, when the transmitter failed.

The energy used by it was produced by 3,600 solar cells. The satellite relied on an active repeater and magnified signal strength by a factor of a hundred using a travelling wave tube amplifier (TWTA).

Thirteen days after the launch, the first live broadcast of a television show between the United States and Europe took place.

=== Broadcasting ===
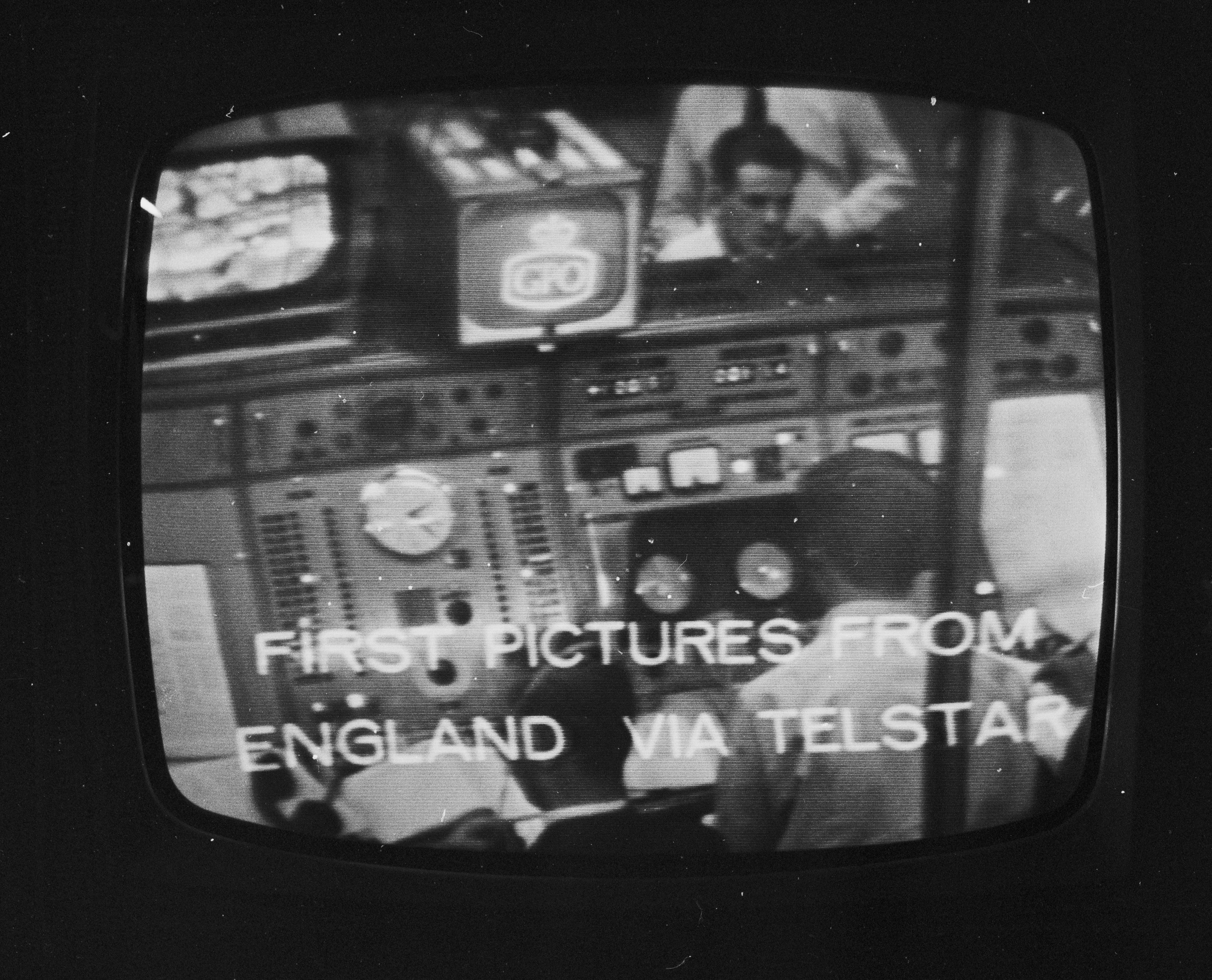
A photograph of a monitor during the first test of Telstar 1 on July 11, 1962

Telstar 1 relayed its first, and non-public, television pictures—a flag outside Andover Earth Station—to Pleumeur-Bodou on July 11, 1962. Almost two weeks later, on July 23, at 3:00 p.m. EDT, it relayed the first publicly available live transatlantic television signal. The broadcast was shown in Europe by Eurovision and in North America by NBC, CBS, ABC, and the CBC. The first public broadcast featured CBS's Walter Cronkite and NBC's Chet Huntley in New York, and the BBC's Richard Dimbleby in Brussels. The first pictures were the Statue of Liberty in New York and the Eiffel Tower in Paris. The first broadcast was to have included remarks by President John F. Kennedy, but the signal was acquired before the president was ready, so engineers filled the lead-in time with a short segment of a WGN telecast of a live game between the Philadelphia Phillies and the Chicago Cubs at Wrigley Field. The Phillies' second baseman Tony Taylor was seen hitting a ball pitched by the Cubs' Cal Koonce to deep right field, caught by fielder George Altman for the out. From there, the video switched first to Washington, DC; then to Cape Canaveral, Florida; to the Seattle World's Fair; then to Quebec and finally to Stratford, Ontario. The Washington segment included remarks by President Kennedy, talking about the price of the American dollar, which was causing concern in Europe. When Kennedy denied that the United States would devalue the dollar it immediately strengthened on world markets; Cronkite later said that "we all glimpsed something of the true power of the instrument we had wrought."

That evening, Telstar 1 also relayed the first satellite telephone call, between U.S. vice-president Lyndon Johnson and the chairman of AT&T, Frederick Kappel. It successfully transmitted faxes, data, and both live and taped television, including the first live transmission of television across an ocean from Andover, Maine, US, to Goonhilly Downs, England, and Pleumeur-Bodou, France. (An experimental passive satellite, Echo 1, had been used to reflect and redirect communications signals two years earlier, in 1960.) In August 1962, Telstar 1 became the first satellite used to synchronize time between two continents, bringing the United Kingdom and the United States to within 1 microsecond of each other (previous efforts were accurate to only 2,000 microseconds).

The Telstar 1 satellite also relayed computer data between two IBM 1401 computers. The test, performed on October 25, 1962, sent a message from a transmitting computer in Endicott, New York, to the earth station in Andover, Maine. The message was relayed to the earth station in France, where it was decoded by a second IBM 1401 in La Gaude, France.
