= Ellis Pond =

- Silver Lake, Roxbury Pond
- Location within Maine
- Location: Oxford County, Maine
- Coordinates: 44°39′36″N 70°40′31″W
- Type: glacial lake
- Primary inflows: Garland Brook
- Surface area: 919 acres (372 ha)
- Islands: 5 (2 islands, 3 islets)

Ellis Pond, also known as Silver Lake and Roxbury Pond, is a 919 acres (372 ha) glacial lake in Roxbury, Maine and partially in Byron, Maine, United States. It contains two islands, the bigger being named French Island, and the smaller unnamed. It also contains three small islets, the biggest of which is informally referred to as Loony Island, due to loons nesting there. It is fed by the Garland Brook and various smaller, unnamed streams, brooks, and rivers, and is drained by Ellis River.

In 1940, the pond was estimated to be 920 acres (370 ha) in size, and in 1869, it was estimated to be 1.25 square miles (800 acres) in size.
