= Sweden, Maine =

Town in Oxford county, state of Maine, United States

- Town
- Location within Maine Location within the United States
- Coordinates: 44°07′16″N 70°48′44″W
- Country: United States
- State: Maine
- County: Oxford
- Incorporated: 1813

Area
  - Total: 29.74 sq mi (77.03 km^{2})
  - Land: 28.82 sq mi (74.64 km^{2})
  - Water: 0.92 sq mi (2.38 km^{2})
- Elevation: 653 ft (199 m)

Population (2020)
  - Total: 406
  - Density: 14/sq mi (5.4/km^{2})
- Time zone: UTC-5 (Eastern (EST))
  - Summer (DST): UTC-4 (EDT)
- ZIP Code: 04040
- Area code: 207
- FIPS code: 23-75595
- GNIS feature ID: 582759
- Website: swedenmaine.org

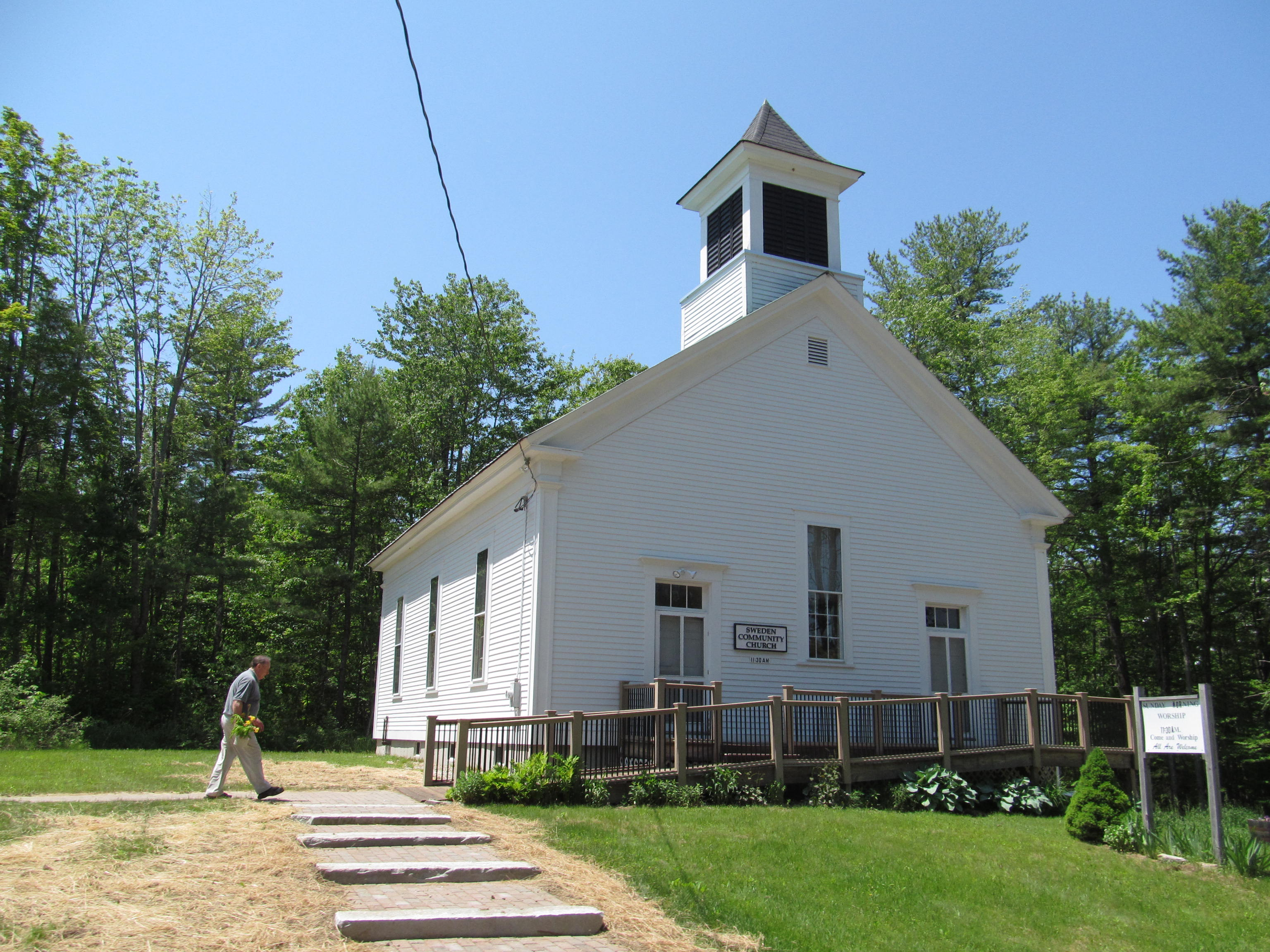
Sweden Community Church

Sweden is a town in Oxford County, Maine, United States. The population was 406 at the 2020 census. Set among hills, forests and ponds, Sweden includes the village of East Sweden.

== History ==
This was once territory of the Abenaki tribe, whose main village was at Pequawket (now Fryeburg). Pequawket was attacked during Dummer's War on May 8, 1725, by Captain John Lovewell and his company of soldiers. Lovewell was killed in the battle, after which the tribe fled to Canada for safety. Called New Suncook Plantation, it was granted by the Massachusetts General Court in 1774 to the officers and soldiers (or heirs) for their services to the state. In 1800, the town was incorporated as Lovell after Captain Lovewell.

The southeast portion of Lovell (which would become Sweden) was first settled in 1794 by Colonel Samuel Nevers from Burlington, Massachusetts. He was followed in 1795–1796 by Benjamin Webber from Bedford, Jacob Stevens from Rowley, Andrew Woodbury and Micah Trull from Tewksbury, and Peter Holden from Malden. On the plan which accompanied the petition for incorporation of the southeast portion, it was labeled Southland. It was set off as "Sweden" on February 26, 1813. The surface of the town is somewhat broken, but had good soil for farming, particularly the cultivation of grains. Other industries included a sawmill that produced short and long lumber, in addition to shooks. The town also had a carriage factory.

== Geography ==
According to the United States Census Bureau, the town has a total area of 29.74 square miles (77.03 km^{2}), of which 28.82 square miles (74.64 km^{2}) is land and 0.92 square miles (2.38 km^{2}) is water. It is drained by Plummer Brook and the Kezar River.

The town is crossed by state route 93. It borders the towns of Waterford to the northeast, Lovell to the northwest, Fryeburg to the southwest, and Bridgton to the southeast.

== Demographics ==
Historical population
Census	Pop.	Note	%±
1820	249		—
1830	487		95.6%
1840	670		37.6%
1850	696		3.9%
1860	728		4.6%
1870	549		−24.6%
1880	474		−13.7%
1890	338		−28.7%
1900	282		−16.6%
1910	266		−5.7%
1920	225		−15.4%
1930	189		−16.0%
1940	225		19.0%
1950	212		−5.8%
1960	119		−43.9%
1970	110		−7.6%
1980	163		48.2%
1990	222		36.2%
2000	324		45.9%
2010	391		20.7%
2020	406		3.8%
U.S. Decennial Census

=== 2010 census ===
As of the census of 2010, there were 391 people, 178 households, and 122 families living in the town. The population density was 13.6 inhabitants per square mile (5.3/km^{2}). There were 331 housing units at an average density of 11.5 per square mile (4.4/km^{2}). The racial makeup of the town was 95.9% White, 0.3% African American, 0.5% Native American, 0.3% Asian, 0.3% from other races, and 2.8% from two or more races. Hispanic or Latino of any race were 0.8% of the population.

There were 178 households, of which 24.7% had children under the age of 18 living with them, 56.7% were married couples living together, 5.6% had a female householder with no husband present, 6.2% had a male householder with no wife present, and 31.5% were non-families. 26.4% of all households were made up of individuals, and 9.6% had someone living alone who was 65 years of age or older. The average household size was 2.20 and the average family size was 2.61.

The median age in the town was 50.9 years. 17.6% of residents were under the age of 18; 4.1% were between the ages of 18 and 24; 17.4% were from 25 to 44; 38.9% were from 45 to 64; and 22% were 65 years of age or older. The gender makeup of the town was 48.1% male and 51.9% female.

=== 2000 census ===
As of the census of 2000, there were 324 people, 132 households, and 97 families living in the town. The population density was 11.3 people per square mile (4.4/km^{2}). There were 266 housing units at an average density of 9.3 per square mile (3.6/km^{2}). The racial makeup of the town was 98.77% White, and 1.23% from two or more races. Hispanic or Latino of any race were 0.31% of the population.

There were 132 households, out of which 31.1% had children under the age of 18 living with them, 62.9% were married couples living together, 7.6% had a female householder with no husband present, and 25.8% were non-families. 19.7% of all households were made up of individuals, and 8.3% had someone living alone who was 65 years of age or older. The average household size was 2.45 and the average family size was 2.79.

In the town, the population was spread out, with 24.4% under the age of 18, 4.3% from 18 to 24, 25.6% from 25 to 44, 28.7% from 45 to 64, and 17.0% who were 65 years of age or older. The median age was 42 years. For every 100 females, there were 89.5 males. For every 100 females age 18 and over, there were 96.0 males.

The median income for a household in the town was $30,781, and the median income for a family was $40,625. Males had a median income of $30,000 versus $24,375 for females. The per capita income for the town was $14,991. About 12.9% of families and 19.5% of the population were below the poverty line, including 25.6% of those under age 18 and 35.0% of those age 65 or over.

== Site of interest ==
- Sweden Historical Society
