= Barrows-Steadman Homestead =

Historic house in Maine, United States

- U.S. National Register of Historic Places
- U.S. Historic district – Contributing property
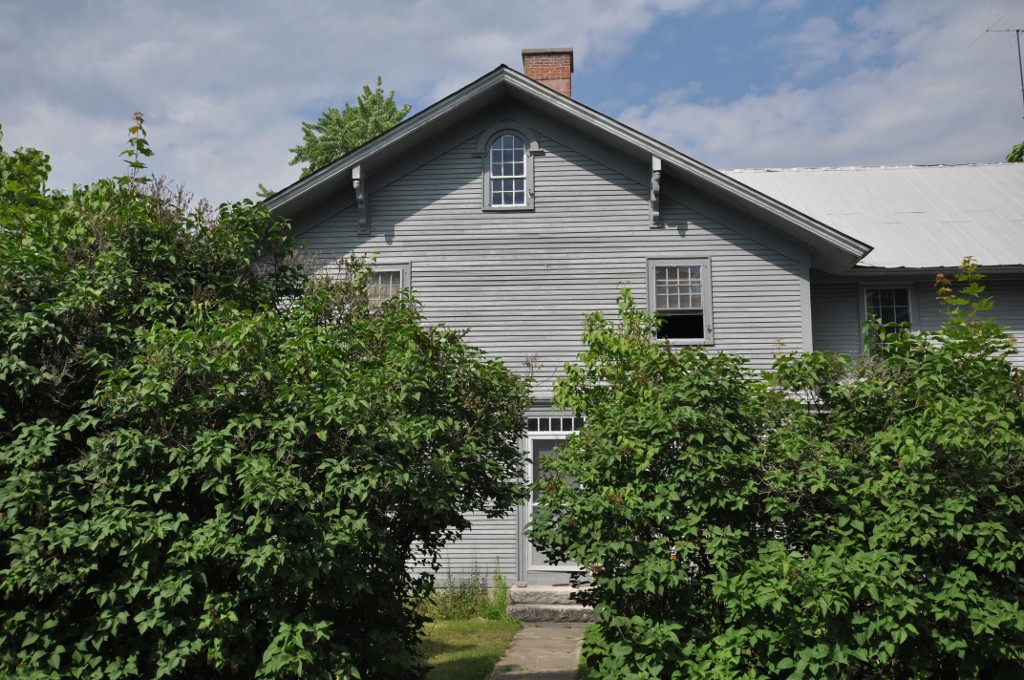

- Location within Maine Location within the United States
- Location: Main St., Fryeburg, Maine
- Coordinates: 44°1′4″N 70°58′47″W
- Area: 0.3 acres (0.12 ha)
- Built: 1809
- Architectural style: Federal
- Part of: Main Street Historic District (ID91000324)
- NRHP reference No.: 82000771

Significant dates
- Added to NRHP: April 12, 1982
- Designated CP: March 22, 1991

The Barrows-Steadman Homestead is a historic house at the northeast corner of Main and Stuart Streets in Fryeburg, Maine, United States. Built c. 1809, this frame house is a good vernacular example of Federal architecture, but is most notable for the murals painted on the walls of one of its bedrooms by Rufus Porter and Jonathan Poor, noted itinerant painters of the 19th century. The house was listed on the National Register of Historic Places in 1982.

== Description and history ==
The Barrows-Steadman House is a 2 1/2-story timber-frame structure, resting on a fieldstone foundation. It is sheathed in clapboard siding, and has a gable roof pierced by two large internal chimneys. Its main facade, facing Main Street to the northwest, is five bays wide, with a center entry flanked by sidelight windows and Doric pilasters and topped by a fanlight and entablature. The secondary entry is on the southwest side, facing Stuart Street, and is centered on a three-bay facade. The house's southwestern gable features a round-arch window and paired brackets, later Italianate additions. An ell, built c. 1910, extends to the rear (along Stuart Street). It has two doorways in its four bays.

The house was built c. 1809, and has been owned by members of the Barrows family since 1820. The house's most notable feature is a room in which murals were drawn in 1830 by the itinerant artist (among many other professions he engaged in) Rufus Porter and Jonathan Poor. This mural is a landscape work, featuring richly colored trees, and is extremely well preserved.

== See also ==
- Deacon Hutchins House, another Oxford County house with Porter murals
- National Register of Historic Places listings in Oxford County, Maine
