= Dummer's War =

Conflict between the New England Colonies and the Wabanaki Confederacy (1722–25)

- Part of the American Indian Wars
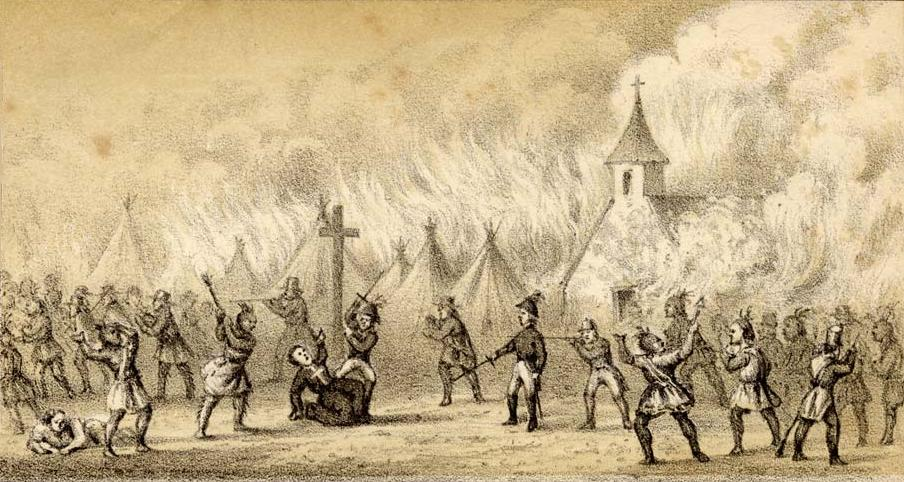
- Battle of Norridgewock (1724): Death of Father Sébastien Rale
Date	25 July 1722 – 15 December 1725
Location	Northern New England and Nova Scotia
Result	Dummer's Treaty (preliminary 1725, final 1727)

Belligerents
New England; Mohawk	Wabanaki Confederacy; Abenaki; Pequawket; Mi'kmaq; Maliseet

Commanders and leaders
William Dummer; John Doucett; Shadrach Walton; Thomas Westbrook; John Lovewell †; Jeremiah Moulton; Johnson Harmon	Gray Lock; Sébastien Rale †; Father Joseph Aubery; Chief Paugus †; Chief Mog †; Chief Wowurna

Strength
Unknown	Unknown

Casualties and losses
Unknown	Unknown

Dummer's War (1722–1725) (Note: Also known as Father Rale's War, the Three Years War, the Wabanaki-New England War, or the Fourth Anglo-Abenaki War.) was a series of battles between the New England Colonies and the Wabanaki Confederacy (specifically the Miꞌkmaq, Wolastoqiyik, Penobscot, and Abenaki), who were allied with New France. The eastern theater of the war was located primarily along the border between New England, Acadia, and Nova Scotia. The western theater was located in northern Massachusetts and Vermont in the frontier areas between New France and New England.

The root cause of the conflict in the eastern theater concerned the border between Acadia and New England, which New France defined as the Kennebec River in southern Maine. Mainland Nova Scotia came under British control after the Siege of Port Royal in 1710 and the Treaty of Utrecht in 1713 (not including Cape Breton Island), but present-day New Brunswick and Maine remained contested between New England and New France. New France established Catholic missions among the four largest Native villages in the region: one on the Kennebec River (Norridgewock), one farther north on the Penobscot River (Penobscot Indian Island Reservation), one on the Saint John River (Meductic Indian Village / Fort Meductic), and one at Shubenacadie, Nova Scotia (Saint Anne's Mission). New France also established three forts along the border of New Brunswick to protect it from a British attack from Nova Scotia.

The Treaty of Utrecht ended Queen Anne's War, but it had been signed in Europe and had not involved any member of the Wabanaki Confederacy. The Abenaki signed the 1713 Treaty of Portsmouth, but they were not consulted about British ownership of Nova Scotia, and the Miꞌkmaq began to make raids against New England fishermen and settlements. The war began on two fronts as a result of the expansion of New England settlements along the coast of Maine and at Canso, Nova Scotia. The New Englanders were led primarily by Massachusetts Lieutenant Governor William Dummer, Nova Scotia Lieutenant Governor John Doucett, and Captain John Lovewell. The Wabanaki Confederacy and other indigenous tribes were led primarily by Sébastien Rale, Chief Gray Lock, and Chief Paugus.

During the war, Rale was killed by a force of New England militia at Norridgewock. The Native population retreated from the Kennebec and Penobscot rivers to Saint-François-du-Lac and Bécancour, and New England took over much of the Maine territory.

== Background ==
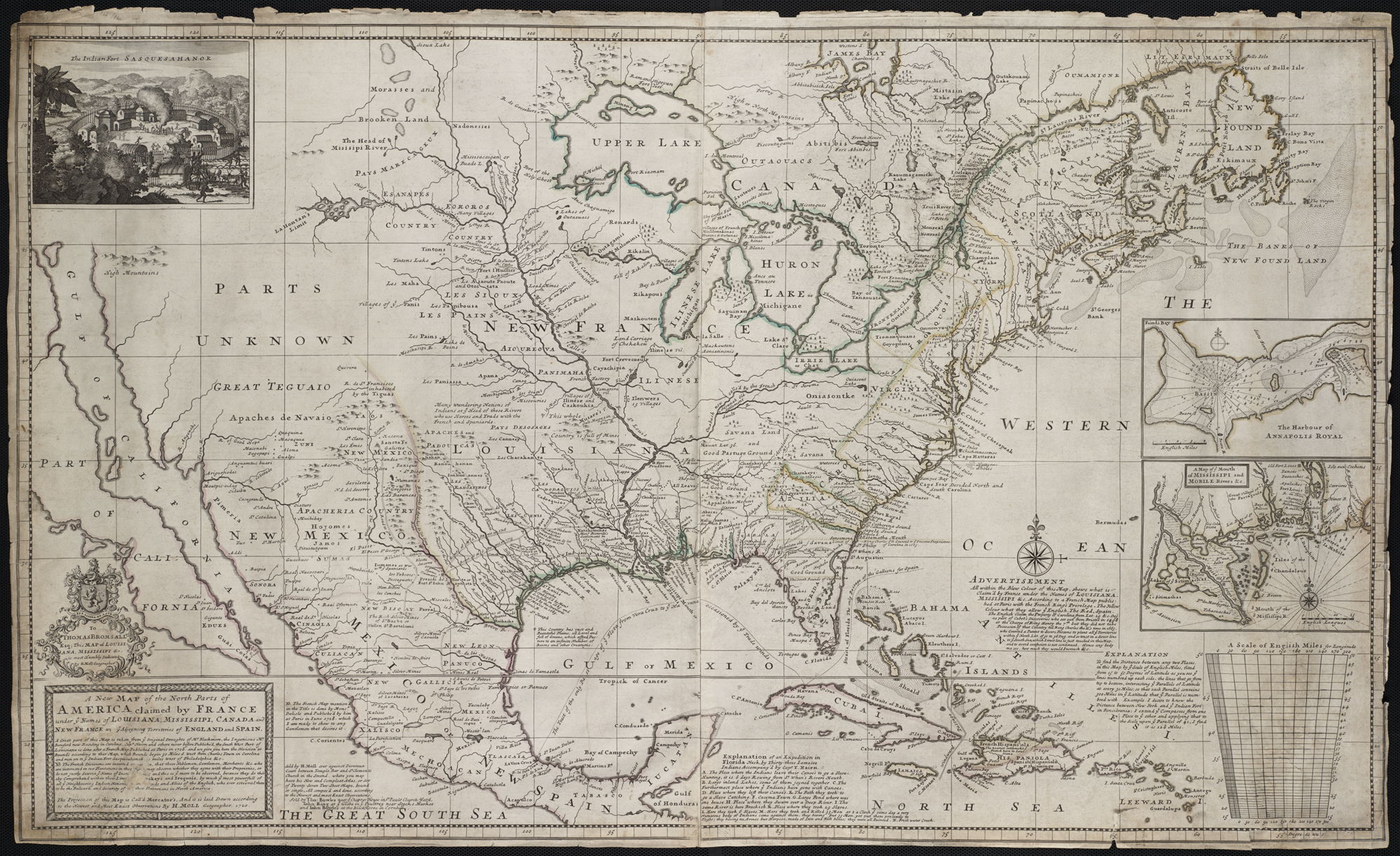
A New Map of the North Parts of America claimed by France under the names of Louisiana... in 1720 drawn by Herman Moll

Dummer's War is also known as the Fourth Anglo-Abenaki War. The three previous Indian Wars were King Philip's War (or the First Indian War) in 1675, King William's War (or the Second Indian War), and Queen Anne's War (or the Third Indian War) from 1703 to 1711.

Queen Anne's War ended with the Peace of Utrecht in 1713. The colonial borders of northeastern America were reshaped as a result, but the treaty did not account for Indian claims to the same area. Acadia was ceded to Great Britain which established the province of Nova Scotia, although its borders were disputed. The area disputed by the European powers consisted of land between the Kennebec River and the Isthmus of Chignecto (encompassing the eastern portion of Maine and all of the Canadian province of New Brunswick). This land was occupied by a number of Algonquian-speaking Indian tribes loosely allied in the Wabanaki Confederacy, which also claimed sovereignty over most of this territory and had occupied portions of the land before the colonists.

Massachusetts Governor Joseph Dudley organized a major peace conference at Portsmouth, New Hampshire. In negotiations there and at Casco Bay, the Wabanaki objected to British assertions that the French had ceded their territory to Britain in eastern Maine and New Brunswick, but they agreed to confirm the boundaries at the Kennebec River and to establish government-run trading posts in their territory. The Treaty of Portsmouth was ratified on July 13, 1713, by eight representatives of the Wabanaki Confederacy, however, which asserted British sovereignty over their territory. Over the next year, other Abenaki tribal leaders also signed the treaty, but no Miꞌkmaq ever signed it or any other treaty until 1726.

== Encroachment of settlements and fortifications ==
Following the peace, New England settlements expanded east of the Kennebec River, and significant numbers of New Englanders began fishing in Nova Scotia waters. They established a permanent fishing settlement at Canso, Nova Scotia, which upset the local Miꞌkmaq, who then began raiding the settlement and attacking the fishermen. In response to Wabanaki hostilities, Nova Scotia Governor Richard Philipps built a fort at Canso, Nova Scotia, in 1720. Massachusetts governors Joseph Dudley and Samuel Shute built forts around the mouth of the Kennebec River: Fort George at Brunswick (1715), Fort Menaskoux at Arrowsic (1717), St. George's Fort at Thomaston (1720), and Fort Richmond (1721) at Richmond. The French built a church in the Abenaki village of Norridgewock in Madison, Maine on the Kennebec River, maintained a mission at Penobscot on the Penobscot River, and built a church in the Maliseet village of Meductic on the Saint John River.

In a meeting at Arrowsic, Maine in 1717, Governor Shute and representatives of the Wabanakis attempted to reach some agreement concerning encroachment on Wabanaki lands and the establishment of provincially operated trading posts. Kennebec sachem Wiwurna objected to colonists establishing settlements and constructing forts; he claimed sovereign control of the land, while Shute reasserted colonial rights to expand into the territory. The Wabanakis were willing to accede to existing settlements if a proper boundary was delineated, beyond which settlement would not be allowed. Shute responded, "We desire only what is our own, and that we will have."

Over the next several years, New England colonists continued to settle in Wabanaki lands east of the Kennebec River, and the Wabanakis responded by stealing livestock. Canso was established as a fishing settlement disputed by all three parties but fortified by Nova Scotia and primarily occupied by Massachusetts fishermen. Miꞌkmaq and French forces attacked it in 1720, further raising tensions. Shute protested the presence of the French Jesuit priest Sébastien Rale, who lived among the Kennebec tribe at Norridgewock in central Maine, and he demanded that Rale be removed. The Wabanakis refused in July 1721 and demanded that hostages be released (who had been given in surety during earlier negotiations) in exchange for a delivery of furs made in restitution for their raiding. Massachusetts made no official response.

The Wabanakis then went to extraordinary lengths to produce a written document reasserting their sovereign claims to disputed areas, delineating the areas that they claimed, and threatening violence if their territory was violated. Shute dismissed the letter as "insolent and menacing" and sent militia forces to Arrowsic. He also asserted that the Wabanaki claims were part of a French intrigue, based on Rale's influence, to further French claims to the disputed areas.

== Undeclared war ==
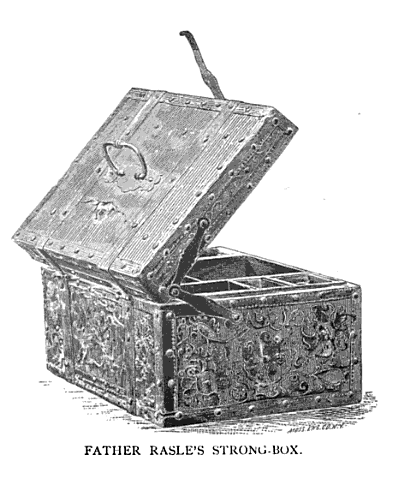
Raid on Norridgewock (1722): Westbrook confiscates Father Rale's Strongbox

Governor Shute was convinced that the French were behind Wabanaki claims, so he sent a military expedition under the command of Colonel Thomas Westbrook of Thomaston to capture Father Rale in January 1722. Most of the tribe was away hunting, and Westbrook's 300 soldiers surrounded Norridgewock to capture Rale, but he was forewarned and escaped into the forest. They found his strongbox among his possessions, however, which contained a secret compartment. Inside that compartment they found letters implicating Rale as an agent of the government of Canada, promising Indians enough ammunition to drive the British colonists from their settlements.

Shute reiterated English claims of sovereignty over the disputed areas in letters to the Lords of Trade and to Governor General Philippe de Rigaud Vaudreuil of New France. Vaudreuil pointed out in response that France claimed sovereignty over the area, while the Wabanakis maintained possession, and he suggested that Shute misunderstood the way in which European ideas of ownership differed from those of the Indians.

In response to the raid on Norridgewock, the Abenakis raided Fort George on June 13 which was under the command of Captain John Gyles. They burned the homes of the village and took 60 prisoners, most of whom were later released. On July 15, Father Lauverjat from Penobscot led 500 to 600 Indians from Penobscot and Medunic (Maliseet) and laid siege to Fort St. George for 12 days. They burned a sawmill, a large sloop, and sundry houses, and killed many of their cattle. Five New Englanders were killed and seven were taken prisoner, while the New Englanders killed 20 Maliseet and Penobscot warriors. After the raid, Westbrook was given command of the fort. Following this raid, Brunswick was raided again and burned before the warriors returned to Norridgewock.

In response to the New England attack on Father Rale at Norridgewock in March 1722, 165 Miꞌkmaq and Maliseet fighters gathered at Minas (Grand Pre, Nova Scotia) to lay siege to Annapolis Royal. Lieutenant Governor John Doucett took 22 Miꞌkmaqs hostage in May to prevent the provincial capital from being attacked. In July, the Abenakis and Miꞌkmaqs blockaded Annapolis Royal with the intent of starving the capital. The Indians captured 18 fishing vessels and prisoners in raids from Cape Sable Island to Canso. They also seized prisoners and vessels working in the Bay of Fundy.

On July 25, Governor Shute formally declared war on the Wabanakis. Lieutenant Governor William Dummer conducted the Massachusetts involvement in the war, since Shute sailed for England at the end of 1722 to deal with ongoing disputes that he had with the Massachusetts colonial assembly.

== Eastern theater (Maine and New Hampshire) ==
=== 1722 campaign ===
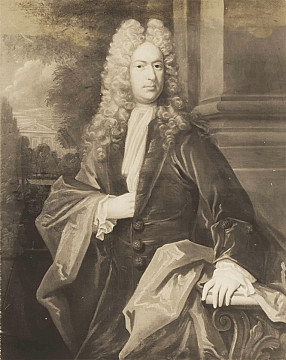
Lieutenant Governor of Massachusetts William Dummer

Between 400 and 500 St. Francis (Odanak, Quebec) and Miꞌkmaq Indians attacked Arrowsic, Maine on September 10, in conjunction with Father Rale at Norridgewock. Captain Penhallow discharged musketry from a small guard, wounding three of the Indians and killing another. This defense gave the inhabitants of the village time to retreat into the fort, leaving the Indians in full possession of the village. They slaughtered 50 head of cattle and set fire to 26 houses outside the fort, then assaulted the fort, killing one New Englander but otherwise making little impression.

That night, Col. Walton and Capt. Harman arrived with 30 men, to which were added approximately 40 men from the fort under Captains Penhallow and Temple. The combined force of 70 men attacked the Indians, but they were overwhelmed by their numbers. The New Englanders then retreated back into the fort. The Indians eventually retired up the river, viewing further attacks on the fort as useless. During their return to Norridgewock, the Indians attacked Fort Richmond with a three-hour siege. They burned homes and killed cattle, but the fort held. They destroyed Brunswick and other settlements near the mouth of the Kennebec.

On March 9, 1723, Colonel Thomas Westbrook led 230 men to the Penobscot River and traveled approximately 32 miles (51 km) upstream to the Penobscot Village. They found a large Penobscot fort some 70 by 50 yards (64 by 46 m), with 14-foot (4.3 m) walls surrounding 23 wigwams. There was also a large chapel (60 by 30 feet [18.3 by 9.1 m]). The village was vacant, and the soldiers burned it to the ground.

=== 1723 campaign ===
The Wabanaki Confederacy of Acadia orchestrated a total of 14 raids against towns along the border of New England throughout 1723, primarily in Maine. The raids started in April and lasted until December, during which 30 people were killed or taken captive. The Indian attacks were so fierce along the Maine frontier that Dummer ordered residents to evacuate to the blockhouses in the spring of 1724.

=== 1724 campaign ===
During the spring of 1724, the Wabanaki Confederacy conducted ten raids on the Maine frontier which killed, wounded, or imprisoned more than 30 New Englanders. They took a sloop in Kennebunk harbor and slaughtered the entire crew.

In the spring of 1724, Captain Josiah Winslow took command of St. George's Fort at Thomaston; he was the older brother of John Winslow. On 30 April 1724, Winslow and Sergeant Harvey left George's Fort with 17 men in two whale boats, and they went downriver several miles to Green Island. The following day, the two whale boats became separated and approximately 200 to 300 Abenakis descended on Harvey's boat, killing Harvey and all of his men except three Indian guides who escaped to the Georges fort. Captain Winslow was then surrounded by 30 to 40 canoes which came off from both sides of the river and attacked him. After hours of fighting, Winslow and his men were killed except for three friendly Indians who escaped back to the fort. The Tarrantine Indians were reported to have lost more than 25 men.

Indians killed one man and wounded another at Purpooduck on May 27. In June, Indians raided Dover, New Hampshire and took Elizabeth Hanson into captivity. They also engaged in a canoe campaign, assisted by the Miꞌkmaqs from Cape Sable Island. In just a few weeks, they had captured 22 vessels, killing 22 New Englanders and taking more prisoner. They also made an unsuccessful siege of St. George's Fort.

=== Battle of Norridgewock ===
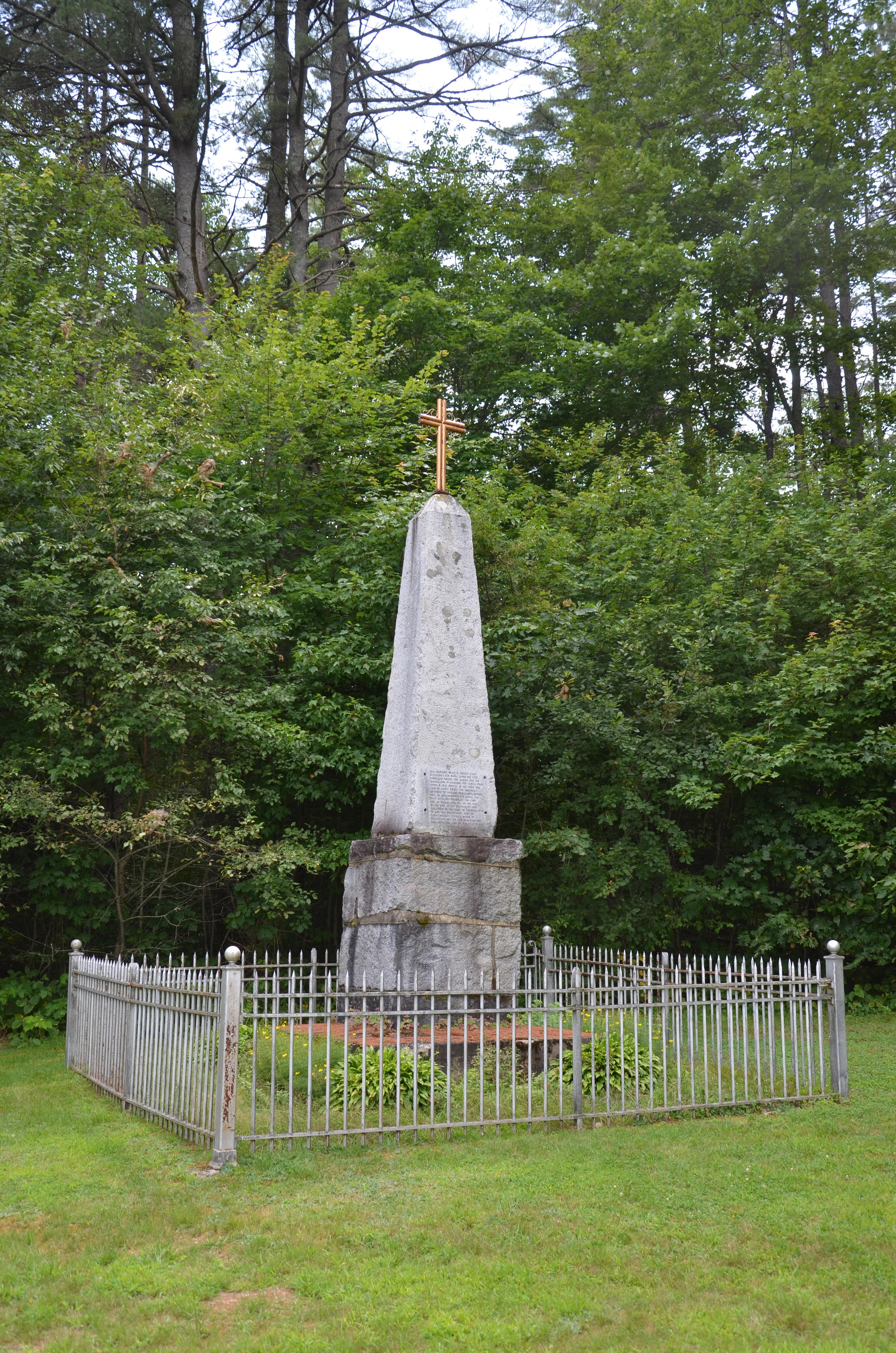
The Father Rale memorial at the battle site in Madison, Maine

In the second half of 1724, the New Englanders launched an aggressive campaign up the Kennebec and Penobscot rivers. On August 22, captains Jeremiah Moulton and Johnson Harmon led 200 rangers to Norridgewock to kill Father Rale and destroy the settlement. There were 160 Abenakis, many of whom chose to flee rather than fight. At least 31 chose to fight, and most of them were killed. Rale was killed in the opening moments of the battle, a leading chief was killed, and nearly two dozen women and children.

The colonists had casualties of two militiamen and one Mohawk. Harmon destroyed the Abenaki farms, and those who had escaped were forced to abandon their village and move northward to the Abenaki village of St. Francis and Bécancour, Quebec.

== Lovewell's raids ==
Captain John Lovewell made three expeditions against the Indians. On the first expedition in December 1724, he and his militia company of 30 men (often called "snowshoe men") left Dunstable, New Hampshire, trekking to the north of Lake Winnipesaukee ("Winnipiscogee Lake") into the White Mountains of New Hampshire. On December 10, 1724, they and a company of rangers killed two Abenakis. In February 1725, Lovewell made a second expedition to the Lake Winnipesaukee area. On February 20, his force came across wigwams at the head of the Salmon Falls River in Wakefield, New Hampshire, where 10 Indians were killed.

=== Battle of Pequawket ===
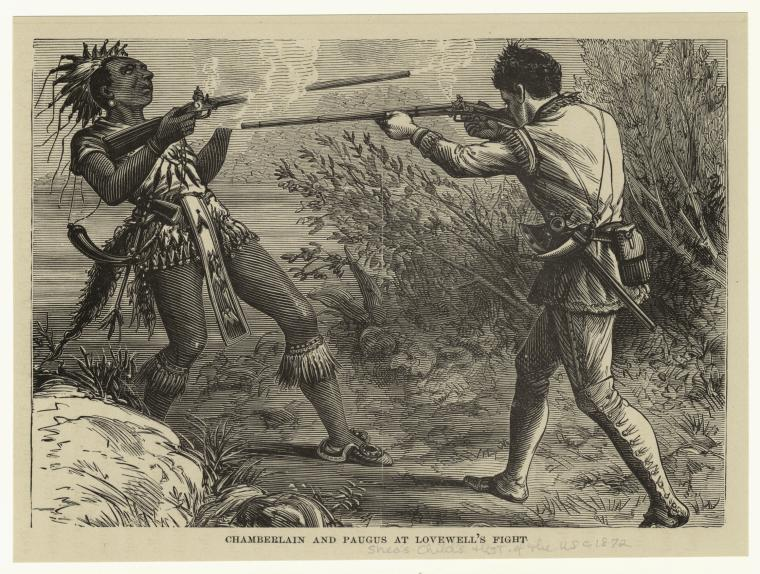
Death of Chief Paugus

Lovewell's third expedition consisted of 46 men and left from Dunstable on April 16, 1725. They built a fort at Ossipee, New Hampshire and garrisoned it with 10 men, including a doctor and John Goffe, while the rest left to raid the Pequawket tribe at Fryeburg, Maine. On May 9, chaplain Jonathan Frye was leading the militiamen in prayer when they spotted a lone Abenaki warrior. Lovewell and his men closed in on the warrior, leaving their packs behind in a clearing. Shortly after they left, a Pequawket war party led by Chief Paugus discovered the packs, and they set up an ambush in anticipation of their eventual return.

Lovewell and his men caught up with the warrior and exchanged gunfire. Lovewell and one of his men were wounded in the encounter, and the Indian was killed by Ensign Seth Wyman, Lovewell's second in command. Lovewell's force then returned to their packs and the ambush was sprung. Lovewell and 8 of his men were killed and two were wounded when the Pequawkets opened fire. The survivors managed to retreat to a strong position, and fended off repeated attacks until the Pequawkets withdrew around sunset. Only 20 of the militiamen survived the battle; three died on the return journey. The Pequawket losses included Chief Paugus.

== Western theater: Vermont and western Massachusetts ==
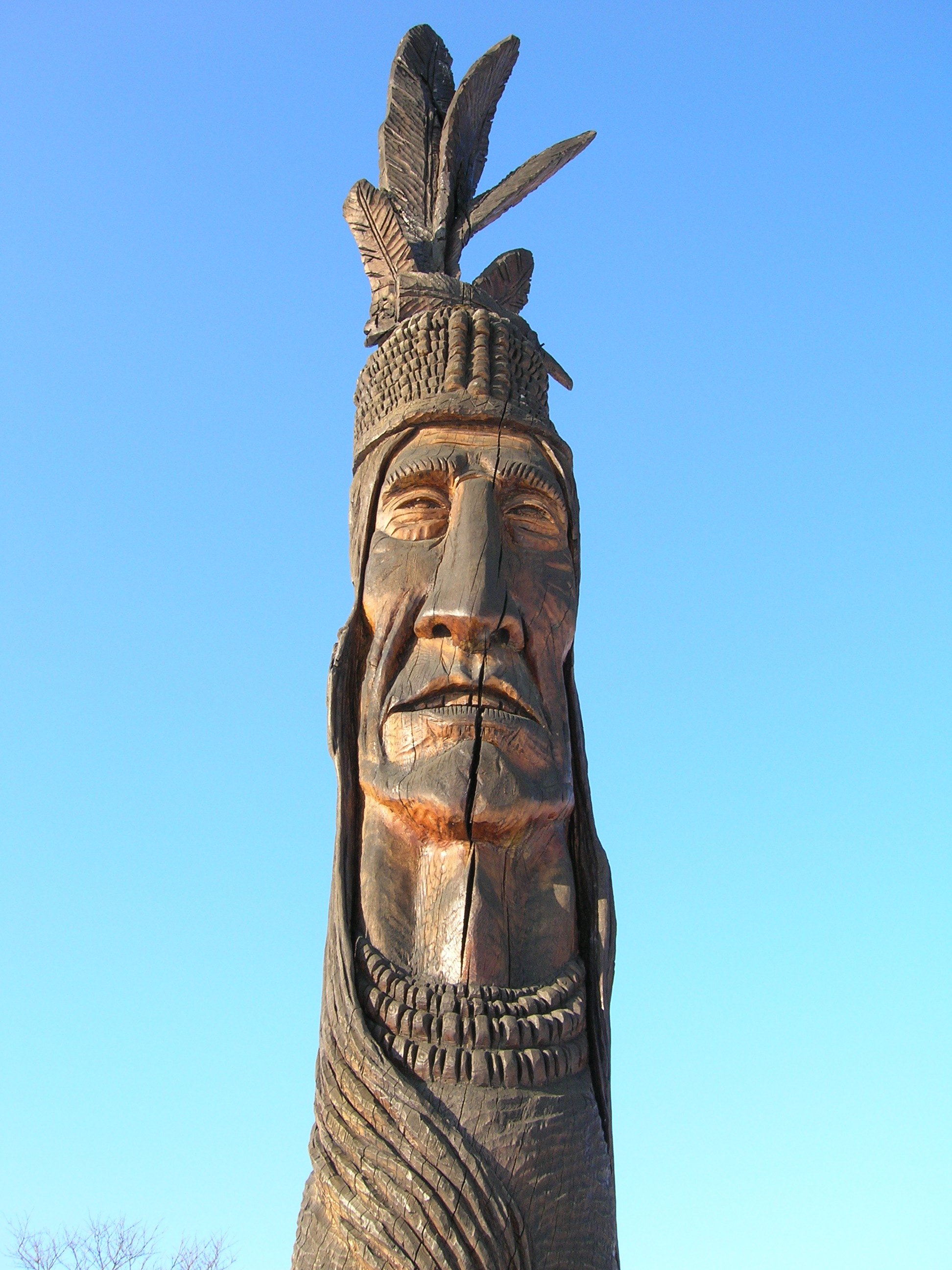
Monument of Chief Grey Lock in Battery Park (Burlington, Vermont)

The western theater of the war has also been referred to as "Grey Lock's War". On August 13, 1723, Gray Lock entered the war by raiding Northfield, Massachusetts, where four warriors killed two citizens. The next day, they attacked Joseph Stevens and his four sons in Rutland, Massachusetts. Stevens escaped, two of the boys were killed, and the other two sons were captured. On October 9, 1723, Gray Lock struck two small forts near Northfield, inflicting casualties and carrying off one captive.

In response, Governor Dummer ordered the construction of Fort Dummer in what is now Brattleboro, Vermont. The fort became a major base of operations for scouting and punitive expeditions into Abenaki country. Fort Dummer was Vermont's first permanent colonial settlement, made under the command of Lieutenant Timothy Dwight. On June 18, 1724, Grey Lock attacked a group of men working in a meadow near Hatfield, Massachusetts. He then moved on and killed men at Deerfield, Northfield, and Westfield over the summer. In response to the raids, Dummer ordered more soldiers for Northfield, Brookfield, Deerfield, and Sunderland, Massachusetts. On October 11, 1724, 70 Abenakis attacked Fort Dummer and killed three or four soldiers. In September 1725, a scouting party of six men was sent out from Fort Dummer. Grey Lock and 14 others ambushed them just west of the Connecticut River, killing two and wounding and capturing three others. One man escaped, while two Indians were killed.

== Nova Scotia theater ==
Nova Scotia's governor launched a campaign to end the Miꞌkmaq blockade of Annapolis Royal at the end of July 1722. They retrieved over 86 New England prisoners taken by the Indians. One of these operations resulted in the Battle of Winnepang (Jeddore Harbour), in which 35 Indians and five New Englanders were killed. Only five Indian bodies were recovered from the battle, and the New Englanders decapitated the corpses and set the severed heads on pikes surrounding Canso, Nova Scotia's new fort. During the war, a church was erected at the Catholic mission in the Miꞌkmaq village of Shubenacadie (Saint Anne's Mission). In 1723, Miꞌkmaqs raided the village of Canso, killing five fishermen, so the New Englanders built a 12-gun blockhouse to guard the village and fishery.

The worst moment of the war for Annapolis Royal came on July 4, 1724, when a group of 60 Miꞌkmaqs and Maliseets raided the capital. They killed and scalped a sergeant and a private, wounded four more soldiers, and terrorized the village. They also burned houses and took prisoners. The New Englanders responded by executing one of the Miꞌkmaq hostages on the same spot where the sergeant was killed. They also burned three Acadian houses in retaliation. As a result of the raid, they built three blockhouses to protect the town. They moved the Acadian church closer to the fort so that it could be more easily monitored. In 1725, 60 Abenakis and Miꞌkmaqs launched another attack on Canso, destroying two houses and killing six people.

== Peace negotiations ==
Penobscot tribal chiefs expressed a willingness to enter peace talks with Lieutenant Governor Dummer in December 1724. They were opposed in this by French authorities, who continued to encourage the conflict, but Massachusetts Lieutenant Governor Dummer announced a cessation of hostilities on July 31, 1725, following negotiations in March. Dummer and Chiefs Loron and Wenemouet negotiated the terms of this preliminary agreement, which applied only to the Penobscots at first. They were allowed to retain Jesuit priests, but the two parties were in disagreement concerning land titles and British sovereignty over the Wabanakis. French Jesuit Etienne Lauverjat translated the written agreement into Abenaki; Chief Loron immediately repudiated it, specifically rejecting claims of British sovereignty over him.

Despite his disagreement, Loron pursued peace, sending wampum belts to other tribal leaders, although his envoys were unsuccessful in reaching Gray Lock, who continued his raiding expeditions. Peace treaties were signed in Maine on December 15, 1725, and in Nova Scotia on June 15, 1726, involving a large number of tribal chiefs. The peace was reconfirmed by all except Gray Lock at a major gathering at Falmouth in the summer of 1727; other tribal envoys claimed that they were not able to locate him. Gray Lock's activity came to an end in 1727, after which he disappears from historical records.

== Consequences ==
As a result of the war, the Indian population declined on the Kennebec and Penobscot Rivers, and western Maine came more strongly under British control. The terms of Dummer's Treaty were restated at every major new treaty conference for the next 30 years, but there was no major conflict in the area until King George's War in the 1740s.

In New Brunswick and Nova Scotia, Dummer's Treaty marked a significant shift in British relations with the Miꞌkmaqs and Maliseets, who refused to declare themselves British subjects. The French lost their footholds in Maine, while New Brunswick remained under French control for a number of years. The peace in Nova Scotia lasted for 18 years. The British took control of New Brunswick with the defeat of Le Loutre at Fort Beauséjour in 1755. This was the only war fought by the Wabanakis against the British on their own terms and for their own reasons, rather than in support of French interests.

The final major battle of the war was the Battle of Pequawket, or "Lovewell's Fight", which was celebrated in song and story in the 19th century. Henry Wadsworth Longfellow wrote "The Battle of Lovells Pond," and Nathaniel Hawthorne wrote "Roger Malvin's Burial" about the battle, while Henry David Thoreau mentioned it in his A Week on the Concord and Merrimack Rivers. The town of Lovell, Maine is named after John Lovewell. Paugus Bay, the town of Paugus Mill (now part of Albany, New Hampshire), and Mount Paugus in New Hampshire are named after Chief Paugus. The site of the Kennebec village of Norridgewock was declared a National Historic Landmark District in 1993, now located at Old Point in Madison, Maine.

== See also ==
- American Indian Wars
- Colonial American military history
- Conflicts in Nova Scotia, 1749–1755
- Military history of Nova Scotia
- New Hampshire Historical Marker No. 20: Captain Lovewell's War
