= Rivercroft Farm =

- U.S. National Register of Historic Places
- U.S. Historic district
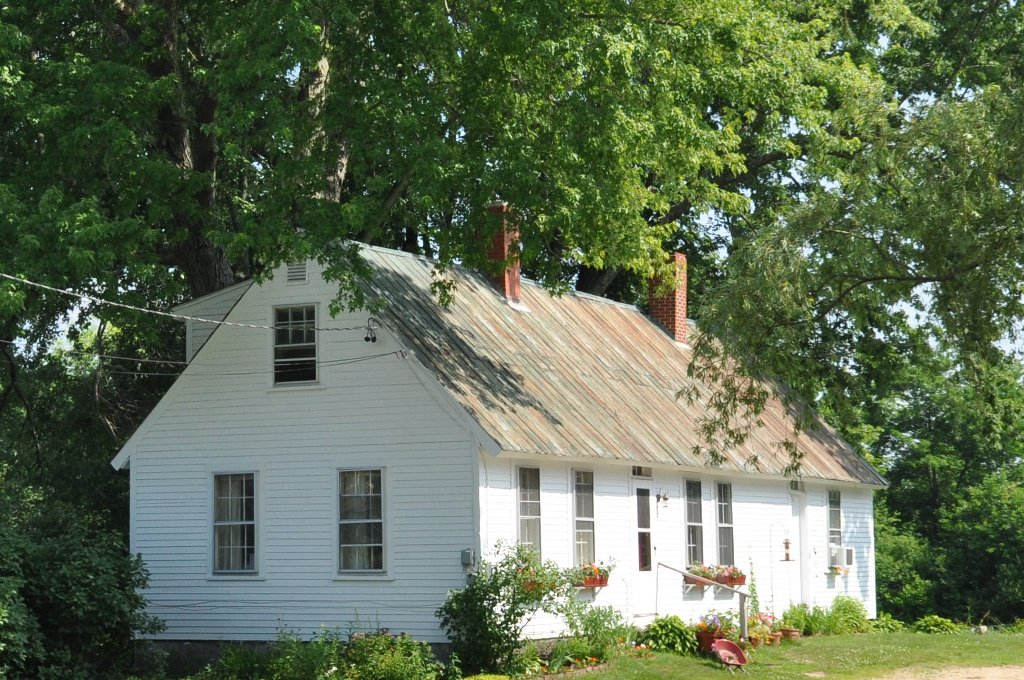

- Location within Maine Location within the United States
- Location: 55, 59 and 60 River St., Fryeburg, Maine
- Coordinates: 44.0165°N 70.9882°W
- Area: 185.9 acres (75.2 ha)
- Built: 1834
- Built by: Francis H. Fassett
- Architectural style: Second Empire, Early Republic
- NRHP reference No.: 08000668
- Added to NRHP: July 16, 2008

Rivercroft Farm is a historic farm complex on River Street (Maine State Route 113) in Fryeburg, Maine. The farm has been in the hands of the Weston family for many generations, and is one of the largest agricultural operations in Fryeburg. The centerpiece of the complex, on the south side of River Street, is a Second Empire house built 1870–73, and believed to be designed by Portland architect Frances H. Fassett. It is a 2 1/2-story wood-frame structure on a stone foundation. Its main block has a mansard roof; ells extend to the rear of the house that have gable roofs. The main facade is three bays wide, with a center entry flanked by paired sash windows, and a four-column porch extending across its width. The roof cornice and dormers have fine woodwork decoration typical of the Second Empire style.

Adjacent to the house is the Yellow Barn, which was built sometime before 1880, and added to in c. 1950 and c. 1985. It is connected to a c. 1950 silo by a short single-story connector. The farm stand, which is also one of the older buildings in the complex, was originally used as a wagon shed, and was converted to its present use in the 1980s. An addition with modern facilities was added to the rear at that time. On the north side of River Street, across from the main complex, stands the White Cape. This 1 1/2-story wood frame Cape style house was built c. 1834.

The first colonial settler of the farm was Henry Brown, who was granted land believed to be north of that granted to Joseph Frye, for whom Fryeburg is named. Brown sold the land when it was established that his grant fell within Fryeburg, and it was purchased in 1800 by Ephraim Weston. In the first half of the 19th century Weston and his successors amassed a significant number of land holdings in Fryeburg and surrounding towns in Maine and New Hampshire, reaching over 1,000 acres (400 ha) at its greatest extent. John Weston (1834-1909) specialized the farm for livestock production, and had what is now the main farmhouse built, replacing an older Federal-style house.

A portion of the Weston's farm holdings, encompassing more than 185 acres (75 ha) and including their houses and major outbuildings, was listed on the National Register of Historic Places.

== See also ==
- National Register of Historic Places listings in Oxford County, Maine
