= Battle of Pequawket =

1725 British colonial victory in Dummer's War

- Part of Dummer's War
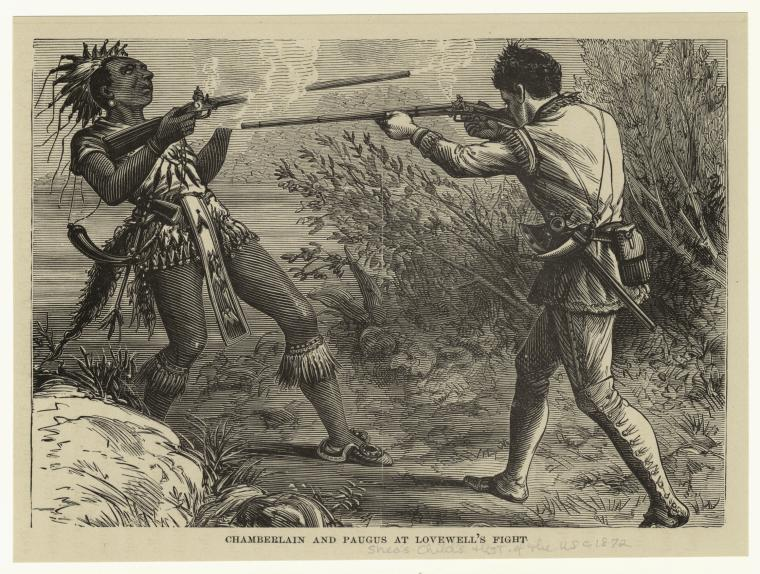
- Death of Chief Paugus
| Date | 9 May 1725 (O.S.) |
| Location | Pequawket (present-day Fryeburg, Maine) 44.021°N 70.936°W |
| Result | British colonial victory |

Belligerents
| Wabanaki Confederacy | New England Colonies |

Commanders and leaders
| Chief Paugus † | John Lovewell †; Seth Wyman |

Strength
| Around 66 | 36 |

Casualties and losses
| Unknown | 13 killed 9 wounded |

The Battle of Pequawket (also known as Lovewell's Fight) occurred on May 9, 1725 (O.S.), (Note: The date of the battle is given variously as Saturday, May 8 or Sunday, May 9. Contemporary official accounts used the date May 9, but early newspapers and pamphlets published the date as May 8. Eckstorm (1936) wrote an account about the discrepancy, blaming Thomas Symmes, the earliest recounter of the battle, for falsifying the date to protect the Frye family from the infamy of Jonathan Frye, the expedition's chaplain, taking a scalp on the sabbath. Kayworth & Potvin (2002), pp. 181−85 summarize Eckstorm's paper. The date is also given in the Old Style (O.S.). When the British changed the calendar to the New Style (N.S.) in 1742, dates were transformed to be 11 days later (i.e. May 19 or 20).) during Dummer's War in northern New England. Captain John Lovewell led a privately organized company of scalp hunters, organized into a makeshift ranger company, and Chief Paugus led the Abenaki at Pequawket, (Note: Among the variant spellings of Pequawket that can be found in historical documents are: Pegwacket, Pequackett, Pequakett, Pequawket, Pequauquauke, Pequawkett and Pigwacket. Evans (1939), pp. 119−25, lists 68 variants.) the site of present-day Fryeburg, Maine. The battle was related to the expansion of New England settlements along the Kennebec River (in present-day Maine).

The battle was the last major engagement between New England and the Wabanaki Confederacy in Governor Dummer's War. The fight was celebrated in song and story for at least several generations and became an important part of regional lore—even influencing the stories of Nathaniel Hawthorne in the early 19th century as well as other writers. Its importance is often exaggerated in local histories, as arguably the August 1724 New England raid on Norridgewock was probably more significant for the direction of the conflict and in bringing the Abenaki to the treaty table.

== Historical context of Dummer's War ==
The Treaty of Utrecht (1713), which ended Queen Anne's War, had facilitated the expansion of New England settlement. The treaty, however, had been signed in Europe and had not involved any tribes of the Natives' Wabanaki Confederacy. Since they had not been consulted, they protested this incursion into their lands by conducting raids on British fishermen and settlements.

For the first and only time, Wabanaki would fight New Englanders and the British on their own terms and for their own reasons and not principally to defend French imperial interests.

In response to Wabanaki hostilities toward the expansion, the Governor of Nova Scotia, Richard Philipps, built a fort in traditional Mi'kmaq territory at Canso, Nova Scotia, in 1720, and Massachusetts Governor Samuel Shute built forts on traditional Abenaki territory at the mouth of the Kennebec River. The French claimed the same territory on the Kennebec River by building churches in the Abenaki villages of Norridgewock and Medoctec further upriver. These fortifications escalated the conflict.

== Lovewell's expeditions ==
In early September 1724 some Indians came to Dunstable and captured two men. When they did not return from work, a party of ten or more men started in pursuit. One man, Josiah Farwell, warned the leader of the possibility of running into an ambush. Despite this the posse rushed ahead, with Farwell following behind. They were ambushed and eight of the men were killed; the others, excepting Farwell who barely escaped, were captured.

Because of these attacks it was thought best to carry on the war more vigorously. Bounties for scalps were once again offered by the provincial government in order to encourage volunteer companies to form (and save the colony the time and expense of raising troops). John Lovewell quickly organized a company of amateur scalp-hunters from the Dunstable area. While they were favored by a grant from the provincial assembly, these troops were not part of the Massachusetts military establishment, but rather a privately organized group of raiders. Lovewell was not a commissioned officer in the provincial forces. Lovewell, whose maternal grandparents had been killed and scalped by Indians, raised the company of thirty men and was appointed by them as captain. In part because of Farwell's common sense Lovewell selected him as his second-in-command and made him lieutenant. Lovewell and Farwell went on three scalp hunting expeditions from December to May.

== Battle ==
Lovewell's third expedition consisted of only 47 men, many of whom were unfamiliar with ranging. With men who were more inexperienced and far fewer in number than in the earlier expeditions, they left from Dunstable (present day Nashua, New Hampshire) on April 16, 1725. The Indian guide and another were unable to continue and returned to Dunstable, along with a relative of the injured colonial. When another fell ill they built a fort at Ossipee and left 10 men, including the ill man, the doctor and John Goffe, to garrison the fort while the rest left to raid the Abenaki village of Pequawket, located near the Saco River. On May 9, as the 34 militiamen were being led in morning prayer by chaplain Jonathan Frye, a lone Abenaki warrior was spotted hunting at the lakeshore. Suspecting that this man was a decoy and that there was an Indian force in front of them, nonetheless the rangers decided to hide their packs and proceed cautiously. Lovewell's men waited until the warrior was close and, although accounts differ in who fired first, the Abenaki did have a chance to fire his fowling piece loaded with beavershot at close range, wounding Lovewell and another. Further fire from the rangers killed the Indian. Chaplain Frye is reported to have scalped the dead Indian.

Meanwhile, the rangers' packs had been discovered by an Abenaki war party (some accounts say two) who, seeing that they outnumbered the rangers, hid in ambush. When the rangers returned to their packs (in single file) the Abenakis fired at the front and rear and charged. Lovewell was killed in the first volley along with eight others. Lovewell's lieutenants, Josiah Farwell and Jonathan Robbins, were among the wounded at this point (they critically). Ensign Seth Wyman organized the defence and was in command of the rangers during the rest of the fight.

After the initial volleys the battle turned into a firefight with individuals on both sides hiding behind trees in the pine plain. Being outnumbered, the rangers had to take care not to be surrounded. Since a tree did not provide any cover from the sides and rear the colonials slowly pulled back to the lake to protect their rear. They then withdrew eastward to a location passed twice earlier that day where, in addition to the lake protecting them from the south, they had a swollen stream on the east (now named Fight Brook), flooded land to the north and fallen trees to the west. Although surrounded, they were able to keep the more numerous enemy further away from accurate fire.

During the battle, the Indian war chief Paugus was shot dead. There is debate over who shot him. Some posit that he was shot by John Chamberlaine ("John Chamberlain, the Indian fighter at Pigwacket"), while others report that it was Seth Wyman who killed the warrior with the next shot. With the death of Paugus, the rest of the Indians soon vanished into the forest.

== Abenaki account of the battle ==
The story of the Battle of Pequawket recounted below was originally told by a daughter of Powack, a chief of the Penobscot people, allied with the Abenaki in the Wabanaki Confederacy. It was retold through generations until it was written down. It appears, as written, in Kayworth & Potvin (2002), pp. 157–158.

Powack wanted peace with New England. He called a council, which then sent him as an envoy to the Pequawkets. Powack took his daughter and Little Elk, her betrothed. While they were staying with the Pequawkets, Paugus, a non-Pequawket, came to the village to recruit for a raiding party against New England. He led all the warriors down the Saco River to English settlements in Maine. The remaining villagers fished at the south end of Saco (Lovewell) Pond until the raiding party finally returned to be the vanguard back to the village. On the way back to the village, the Penobscots heard gunfire from the battle.

Paugus tell Powak he come on packs of white men. He count packs and know he has many more braves than whites so he attacks.

Powack and Little Elk remained at the battle, and all non-combatant Abenaki skirted the battle to return to the village.

Long after moon is up, braves come to village only few. Say Paugus is killed, Powak is killed, Little Elk is killed.

The remaining Pequawkets moved to Canada, and Powack's daughter went with them until she found someone to take her back home.

== Aftermath ==
Only 20 of the militiamen survived the battle; three died on the retreat home. The Abenaki losses except for Paugus are unknown.

The Abenaki deserted the town of Pequawket after the battle and fled to Canada (New France).

== Legacy ==
- More than one hundred years later, Henry Wadsworth Longfellow (poem, "The Battle of Lovells Pond"), Nathaniel Hawthorne (story, "Roger Malvin's Burial") and Henry David Thoreau (passage in the book A Week on the Concord and Merrimack Rivers) all wrote about Lovewell's Fight.
- The lake at which the battle occurred is named Lovewell Pond, and a stream leading to it is named Fight Brook. Paugus Bay in Laconia, New Hampshire; the town of Paugus Mill (now part of Albany, New Hampshire; and Mount Paugus in New Hampshire were named after Chief Paugus. (The town of Fryeburg was named not after the ranger's chaplain, Jonathan Frye, but after Joseph Frye, who was awarded a land grant in the area much later.)
- At the north end of Lovewell Pond in Fryeburg is a small monument to the New England rangers near where the battle took place. It is on Lovewell Pond Road near its junction with Battleground Road and Island Road.
