= Main Street Historic District (Fryeburg, Maine) =

Historic district in Maine, United States

- U.S. National Register of Historic Places
- U.S. Historic district
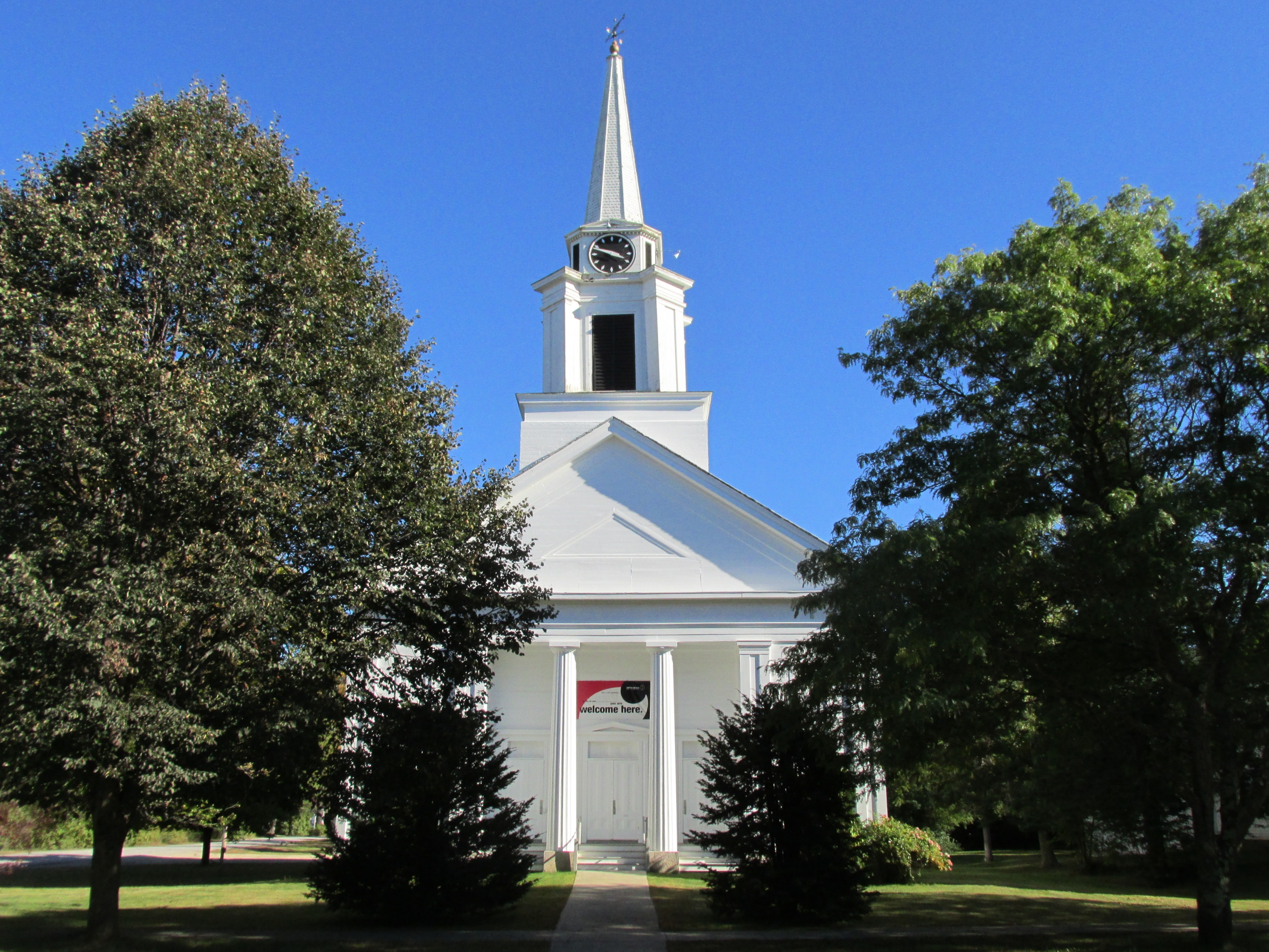
- First Congregational Church

- Location within Maine Location within the United States
- Location: Main Street from Portland St. to about Swans Falls Rd., Fryeburg, Maine
- Area: 55 acres (22 ha)
- Architect: Multiple
- Architectural style: Greek Revival, Italianate, Federal
- NRHP reference No.: 91000324
- Added to NRHP: March 22, 1991

The Main Street Historic District of Fryeburg, Maine, encompasses the growth of the town's principal village between about 1800 and 1935. It extends along Main Street (marked United States Route 302 for part of its length and Maine State Route 5 for all of it), from Woodland Street in the north to Portland Street (SR 5 and Maine State Route 113) in the south, and includes forty primary buildings on 55 acres (22 ha). The district was listed on the National Register of Historic Places in 1991.

== Description and history ==
Fryeburg was established in 1763 by Colonel Joseph Frye, with settlement beginning the following year, on the former site of an Abenaki village called "Pequawket". Its present village site grew around a combination of good agricultural lands and convenient access to the few roads and trails extant at the time, and was the site of its first meeting house, where the First Congregation Church (1848–50, Greek Revival) now stands. Its importance as a civic center was further solidified with the establishment in 1792 of Fryeburg Academy, some of whose buildings are within the district. The most notable of these is the main academy building, designed by Gridley J. F. Bryant and built in 1852-53 by Ammi B. Cutter, with wings designed by John Calvin Stevens added in 1930. The oldest building in the district is the Squire Chase House, built c. 1767 by Nathaniel Merrill, one of Fryeburg's first proprietors, and altered during the 19th century to give it a combination of Federal and Italianate features. The most recent building is the Catholic Church, a rambling frame structure built in 1990.

With the notable exceptions of the academy buildings and a bank, all of the buildings in the district are wood-frame structures, and most are residential houses. Stylistically they are somewhat diverse, reflecting Federal, Greek Revival, and Italianate styles from late 18th and 19th century more than other styles. There is one Shingle style house, the Charles Goodnow House at 137 Main Street, built in 1895, which is one of the finest of the style in the entire county.

In addition to the academy, non-residential buildings in the district include the brick c. 1822 Casco Bank and Trust building at 122 Main Street and the Burnham Jewelry Store, a frame structure built in 1903-11 which is one of the town's best-preserved commercial buildings of the period. The Congregational Church was built in 1848–50, and has a vestry built in 1837. There are two dormitory buildings of the academy that are not historically significant, and there is an old wood-frame gas station, built in 1935.

Two of the district's buildings are separately listed on the National Register. These include the Chase House, noted for its association with an early settler, and the Barrows-Steadman Homestead at 134 Main Street, which has murals drawn on the walls of an upstairs chamber, attributed to itinerant artists Rufus Porter and Jonathan Poor.

== See also ==
- National Register of Historic Places listings in Oxford County, Maine
