= Squire Chase House =

Historic house in Maine, United States

- U.S. National Register of Historic Places
- U.S. Historic district – Contributing property
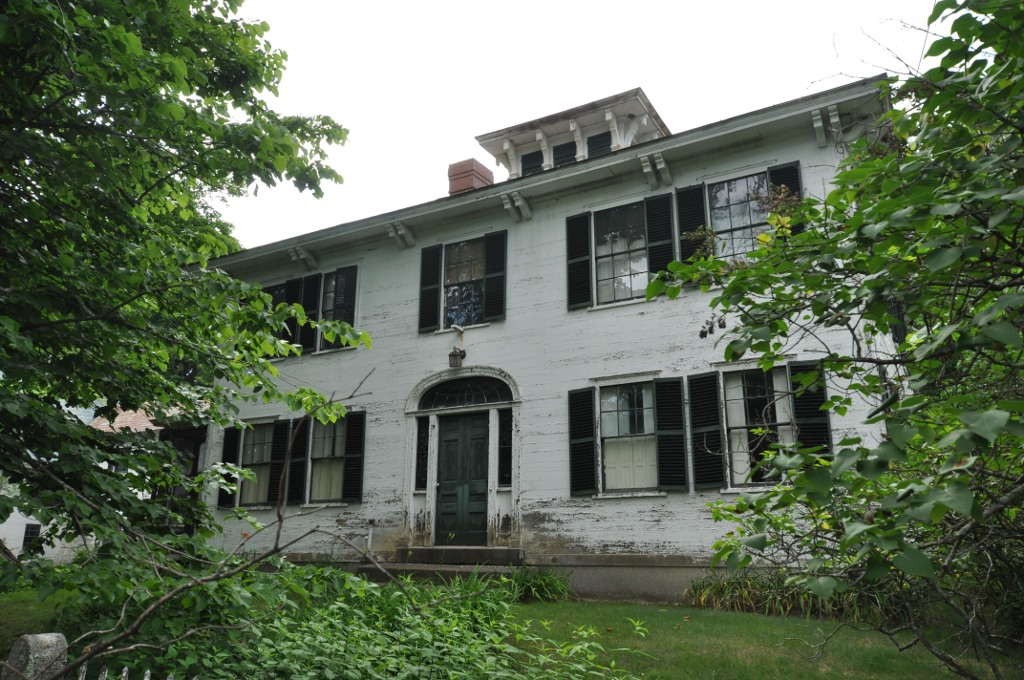

- Location within Maine Location within the United States
- Location: Main St., Fryeburg, Maine
- Coordinates: 44°1′15″N 70°58′34″W
- Area: 0.5 acres (0.20 ha)
- Built: 1767
- Architectural style: Italianate, Federal
- Part of: Main Street Historic District (ID91000324)
- NRHP reference No.: 79000158

Significant dates
- Added to NRHP: May 7, 1979
- Designated CP: March 22, 1991

The Squire Chase House is a historic house on Main Street in Fryeburg, Maine. The oldest portion of this house, now a portion of the elongated ell attached to the main block, was built c. 1767 by Nathaniel Merrill, one of the early settlers of Fryeburg after its land was granted to Joseph Frye in 1762. It was sold in 1799 to James Osgood, the son of another early settler. Stephen and Mary (Osgood) Chase inherited this property in 1824, and moved the main block of the house across the street to its present location, and attached the older house to it. The exterior of this house was Federal in styling, although its interior is now Greek Revival in character.

The property was acquired in 1854 by David R. Hastings, who extended the main block's eaves, adding the brackets and cupola of the then-fashionable Italianate style. In 1908 the house was purchased Hattie Pike, a descendant of James Osgood, and was reported in 1979 to still be in the Pike family.

The main block of the house connected via the ell to a 19th-century barn. A single-story porch extends across the south side of the house, and another extends across much of the eastern face of the ell.

The house was listed on the National Register of Historic Places in 1979. It is located on the northwest side of Main Street, just south of its junction with Bridgton Road, and opposite part of the campus of the Fryeburg Academy.

== See also ==
- National Register of Historic Places listings in Oxford County, Maine
