= John Goffe =

- Born: March 25, 1701; Boston, Massachusetts Bay
- Died: October 20, 1786 (aged 85) Bedford, New Hampshire
- Allegiance: New Hampshire Militia
- Rank: Colonel
- Known for: Hunter; trapper; soldier; judge
- Conflicts: Dummer's War; Battle of Pequawket; King George's War; French and Indian War; Battle of Lake George; Siege of Fort William Henry; Battle of Carillon; Battle of Ticonderoga; Battle of the Thousand Islands
- Spouse: Hannah Griggs
- Children: 9

John Goffe (March 25, 1701 – October 20, 1786) was a soldier in colonial America. His name is preserved in the name of Goffstown, New Hampshire and the Goffe's Falls neighborhood of Manchester, New Hampshire.

== Biography ==
Goffe was the son of John Goffe, the town clerk of Londonderry, New Hampshire, and Hannah Parrish of what is now Nashua, New Hampshire. His grandfather, also named John Goffe, emigrated to New England in 1662 or 1663. Goffe was born in Boston in 1701 and baptized in the Old North Church under the ministry of Increase Mather. As a young man, he was a hunter and trapper in the woods of New Hampshire. He married Hannah Griggs of Roxbury, Massachusetts, on October 16, 1722, with whom he had a family of eight daughters and one son.

=== Service in the Colonial Wars ===
On April 16, 1725, Goffe was with Captain John Lovewell on his third and final expedition against the Abenaki during Dummer's War. He was left with a small garrison at a fort built at Ossipee before Lovewell's Fight near the Abenaki village of Pequewket (within what is now Fryeburg, Maine).

In 1734, Goffe and his family moved to Derryfield, New Hampshire, now named Manchester. In 1744, during King George's War, he became a captain of scouts (snowshoe men) and led a company protecting the frontier of New Hampshire from Indian attack. In 1744, he built a saw mill and a grist mill in Bedford, New Hampshire.

At the outbreak of the French and Indian War in 1754, Goffe rejoined the New Hampshire Militia and served in Joseph Blanchard's Regiment. He saw action at the battles of Lake George, Fort William Henry, Carillon, Ticonderoga and Montreal, during which time he rose to the rank of colonel and became the commander of the New Hampshire Provincial Regiment. In 1760, while en route to Crown Point, the regiment completed work begun in the fall of 1759 by Major Hawks on the Crown Point Military Road, from Fort at Number 4 in what is now Charlestown, New Hampshire, to the northernmost Black River Pond (Lake Amherst). After the war, Goffe became the commander of the Ninth New Hampshire Militia Regiment.

=== American Revolution ===
Though too old (74) at the outbreak of the American Revolutionary War to take command of troops in the field, Goffe was an avid revolutionary, serving in the provincial legislature and becoming the first probate judge for Hillsborough County, New Hampshire. He lived long enough to see the creation of the United States, before dying in 1786. He is buried at the old graveyard in Bedford, New Hampshire.

== See also ==
- New Hampshire Historical Marker No. 102: Colonel John Goffe (1701–1786)

== Sources ==
- Colonel John Goffe: A Sketch by his Great-Grandson by Gordon Woodbury, Manchester, NH 1899
- Colonel John Goffe: 18th Century New Hampshire by William Howard Brown, Lew A Cummings Co. Manchester, NH 1950
- Capt. John Goffe's muster roll 1748
