= John Lovewell =

New Hampshire militia captain (1691-1725)

- Born: October 14, 1691; Dunstable, Province of New Hampshire
- Died: May 9, 1725 (aged 33) Pequawket, Massachusetts Bay (present day Fryeburg, Maine)
- Allegiance: New England Colonies
- Branch: New Hampshire Militia
- Rank: Captain
- Conflicts: Dummer's War; Lovewell's Raids; Battle of Pequawket †
- Spouse: Hannah Lovewell
- Children: 3
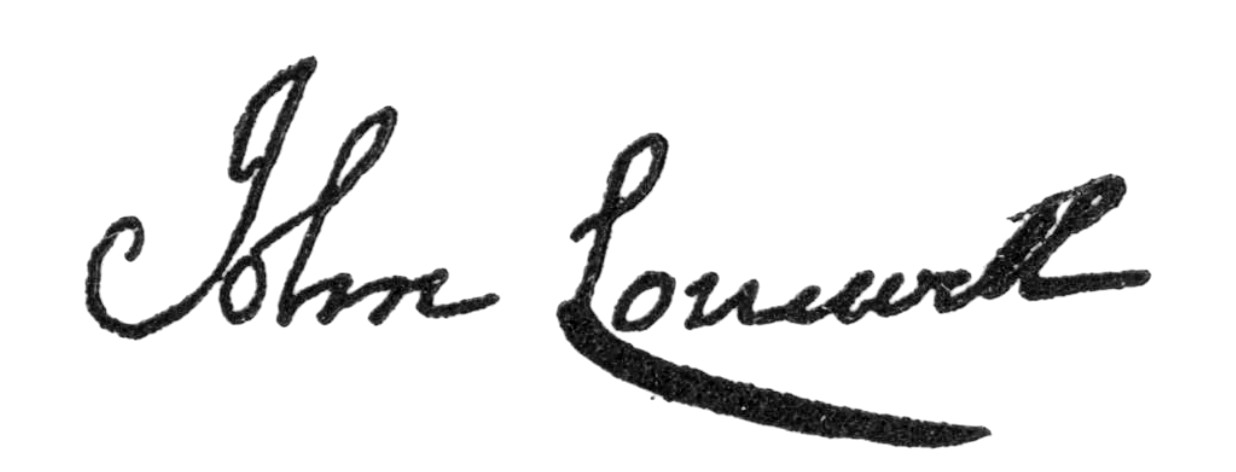
- Signature

John Lovewell (October 14, 1691 – May 9, 1725) was a militia captain who fought during Father Rale's War (also known as Dummer's War or Lovewell's War). He lived in present-day Nashua, New Hampshire. He led three expeditions against the Abenaki Indians. Lovewell became one of the most famous rangers of the 18th century.

Although the outcome was a draw, Lovewell's Fight in May 1725 marked the end of hostilities between the English and the Abenakis of Maine. This conflict was a turning point. So important was it to western Maine, New Hampshire and even Massachusetts colonists that the Fight was celebrated in song and story; more than 100 years later, Henry Wadsworth Longfellow, Nathaniel Hawthorne, and Henry David Thoreau all wrote about Lovewell's Fight.

== Early life ==
John Lovewell was born in Dunstable, New Hampshire, on October 14, 1691 to John and Anna Lovewell. In his youth, a number of people in Dunstable were killed in raids on the settlement, including four family members in the space of a month.

== 1st and 2nd expeditions ==
In early September 1724, Indians captured three men near Dunstable, Massachusetts, in the area now known as Nashua, New Hampshire. When the men did not return from work a party of ten or more men started in pursuit. One man, Joseph Farwell, warned the leader of the possibility of running into an ambush. Despite this the posse rushed ahead with Farwell following behind. They were ambushed and eleven of the men were killed and the others, excepting Farwell who barely escaped, were captured.

Because of these attacks it was thought best to carry on the war more vigorously. Bounties for scalps were again offered by the government and volunteer companies were formed. Favored by a grant from the Assembly, Lovewell, whose maternal grandparents had been killed and scalped by Indians, raised a company of 30 men and was commissioned a captain. In part because of Farwell's commonsense Lovewell selected him as his second-in-command and he was made Lieutenant. Lovewell and Farwell went on three scalp hunting expeditions from December to May.

=== Raid at Lake Winnipesaukee ===
In the first expedition, Lovewell and his militia company of 40 to 50 men left Dunstable on their first expedition in December 1724, trekking to the north of Lake Winnipesaukee into the White Mountains of New Hampshire. On December 10, 40 miles (64 km) north of Winnipesaukee, the troop came upon a wigwam, where they killed and scalped an Abenaki man and took an Abenaki boy captive.

=== Raid on Wakefield ===
On January 29, 1725, Lovewell and 87 men made a second expedition to the White Mountains. For more than a month they marched through the winter forest, encountering neither friend nor foe. Some troops were sent back home. The remainder made a wide loop up towards the White Mountains, followed the Bearcamp River into the Ossipee area, then headed back in an easterly direction along the Maine and New Hampshire border.

On February 20 they came across a recently inhabited wigwam and followed tracks for some 5 miles (8.0 km). On the banks of a pond at the head of the Salmon Falls River in the present town of Wakefield they came upon more wigwams with smoke rising from them. Some time after 2:00 AM Lovewell gave the order to fire. A short time later ten Indians lay dead. The Indians were said to have had numerous extra blankets, snowshoes, moccasins, a few furs and new French muskets which would seem to indicate that they were on their way to attack frontier settlements. Preventing such an attack is probably the true success of this expedition.

Early in March Lovewell's troops arrived in Boston. They paraded their Indian scalps through the streets, Lovewell himself wearing a wig made of Indian scalps. The bounty paid was 1000 pounds (100 per scalp).

== 3rd Expedition: Lovewell's fight ==
The third expedition consisted of only 46 men and left from Dunstable on April 16, 1725. They built a fort at Ossipee and left 10 men, including the doctor and John Goffe, to garrison the fort while the rest left to raid the Abenaki town of Pequawket, now Fryeburg, Maine. On May 9, as the militiamen were being led in prayer by chaplain Jonathan Frye, a lone Abenaki warrior was spotted. Lovewell's men waited until the warrior was close and fired at him, but missed. The Abenaki returned fire, mortally wounding Lovewell. Further fire from the rangers killed the Indian. The militia had left their packs behind so as to be unencumbered by them in battle. Two returning war parties of Abenaki led by Chief Paugus and Nat found them and waited in ambush for the returning militia. Eight men, including Lovewell, were killed in the first volley by the Indian warriors. The battle continued for more than 11 hours until Ensign Wyman killed the Indian war chief Paugus. With the death of Paugus, the rest of the Indians soon vanished into the forest. Only 20 of the militiamen survived the battle; three died on the retreat home. The Abenaki losses except for Paugus are unknown. The Abenaki deserted the town of Pequawket after the battle and fled to Canada.

== Aftermath of the fight ==
Later that month Colonel Ebeneazer Tyng arrived with a large force of militia to bury the dead and take revenge on the Abenaki who had already fled. Without support from the French the western Abenaki were forced to make peace with Massachusetts and New Hampshire. Lovewell's widow and children along with the other widows and children of those slain in the battle were given large tracts of land in what is now Pembroke, New Hampshire.

== Legacy ==
Lovewell Mountain in Washington, New Hampshire, which he climbed to do surveillance, is named for him, as is Lovewell Pond in Fryeburg. The town of Lovell, Maine, derives its name from Lovewell. Captain Lovewell's War is featured on a New Hampshire historical marker (number 20) along New Hampshire Route 16 in Ossipee.

Lovewell was celebrated in song and story. More than one hundred years after his death Henry Wadsworth Longfellow (poem, "The Battle of Lovells Pond"), Nathaniel Hawthorne (story, "Roger Malvin's Burial") and Henry David Thoreau (passage in the book A Week on the Concord and Merrimack Rivers) all wrote about Lovewell's Fight. "The Battle of Lovells Pond", written when Longfellow was 13, retold the story of Lovewell's death; it was Longfellow's first published poem, appearing in the Portland Gazette of November 21, 1820. "Roger Malvin's Burial", an 1832 story, concerns two colonial survivors returning home after what Hawthorne calls "Lovell's Fight."

Land in and around Bow, New Hampshire and Suncook, New Hampshire was granted to survivors and heirs of Lovewell's raid, including to Toby, a Native American scout who had joined Lovewell's party.

Lovewell's wife Hannah married Benjamin Smith of Merrimack a few years after Lovewell's death. His daughter, also named Hannah, married Joseph Baker and settled in Suncook.

== Sources ==
- Bundy, David A. (1975). 100 acres more or less: The history of the land and people of Bow, New Hampshire. Phoenix Pub.
- Grenier, John (2008). The First Way of War: American War Making on the Frontier, 1607–1814. Cambridge University Press. ISBN 9780521732635.
- Stearns, Ezra Scollay (1911). Early generations of the founders of old Dunstable, thirty families. Boston: G. F. Littlefield.
- McClintock, John N. (December 1884). "Lovewell's War". The Granite Monthly. Vol. 7, no. 12. pp. 380–383.
