= Kezar River =

Coordinates: 44.09479°N 70.91757°W

Location
- Country: United States

Physical characteristics
- Source
  - location: Maine

The Kezar River is a 14.2-mile-long (22.9 km) tributary of the Old Course Saco River in western Maine in the United States. It starts at the outlet of Five Kezar Ponds in the town of Lovell, drops over Kezar Falls, and flows southwest, briefly entering the town of Sweden before reentering Lovell and passing that town's central village. Continuing southwest, it enters the town of Fryeburg and ends at the Old Course Saco River northwest of Kezar Pond and 3.5 miles (5.6 km) above the Old Course's mouth at the Saco River.

== See also ==
- List of rivers of Maine
