= Grey Lock's War =

- Part of Dummer's War
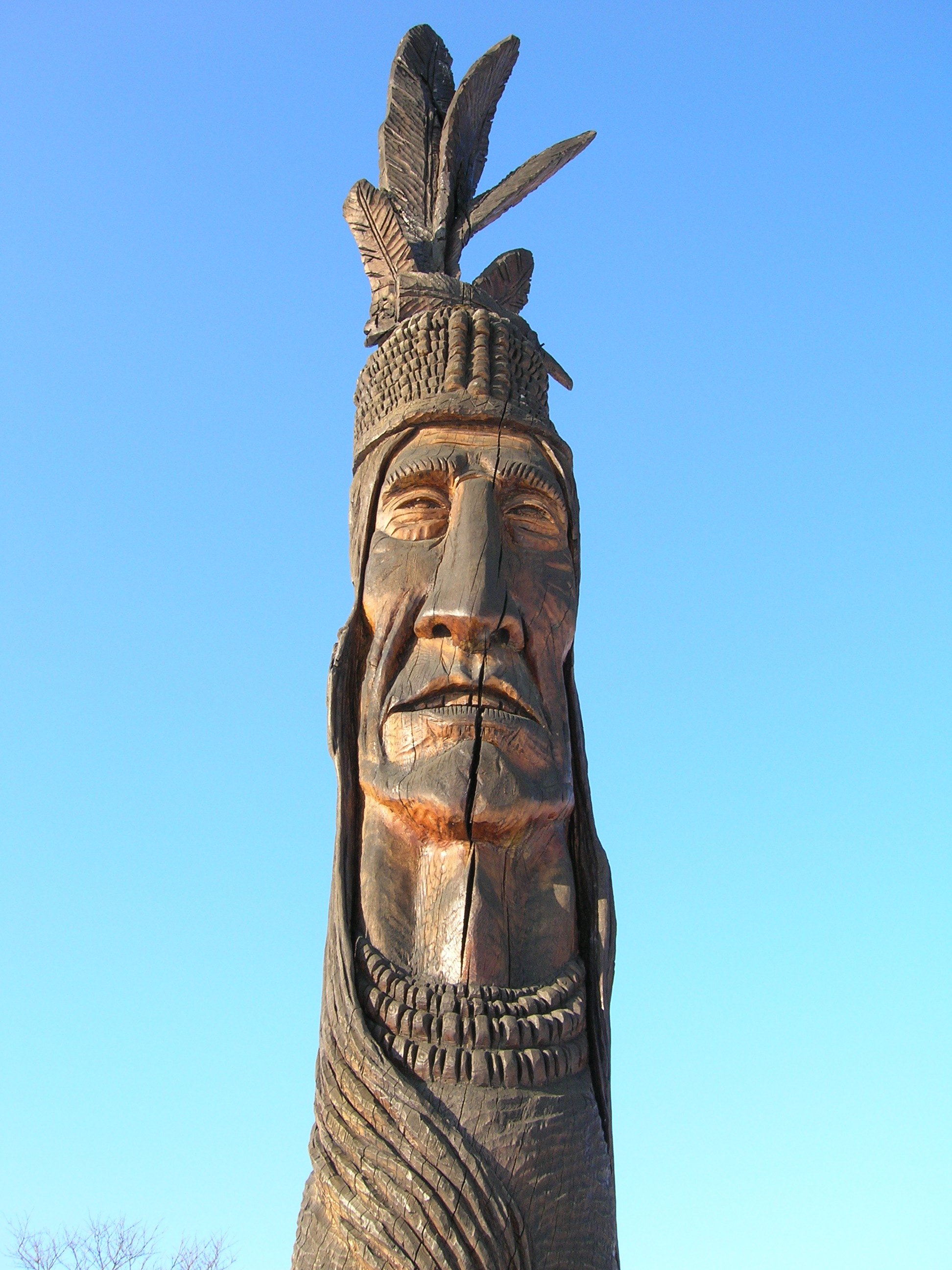
- Monument of Chief Grey Lock in Battery Park (Burlington, Vermont)
Date	August 13, 1723 – September 1725
Location	Northern New England
Result	Wabanaki victory

Belligerents
New England Colonies	Abenaki

Commanders and leaders
Samuel Shute; William Dummer; Timothy Dwight	Gray Lock

Strength
Unknown	At least 70

Casualties and losses
At least 16 killed 3 wounded 6 captured	At least 2 killed Unknown wounded

The western theatre of Dummer's War in the 1720s in northern New England was referred to as "Grey Lock's War". Grey Lock distinguished himself by conducting guerrilla raids into Vermont and western Massachusetts. He consistently eluded his pursuers, and acquired the name Wawanolet (also Wawanolewat, Wawanotewat), meaning "he who fools the others, or puts someone off the track."

Grey Lock's War was not part of the conflicts between France and England. Unlike the continuing wars between France and England that involved local natives, often to their detriment, Grey Lock's War was fought by Native Americans for their own reasons.

Grey Lock, like the majority of his people, did eventually ally himself with the French. Ancient Jesuit records from Fort Saint-Frédéric, demonstrates that this great war chief, was known to the French as la "Tête Blanche" (White Head). He converted to Catholicism and was baptized under the French name of Pierre-Jean, while his wife was known as Hélène. They had a son and a daughter, Jean-Baptiste and Marie-Charlotte. Gray Lock's descendants today carry the family name Wawanolet.

== Conflicts ==
Massachusetts Governor Samuel Shute officially declared war on the Abenaki on July 25, 1722. Shute, who had ongoing political disputes with the Massachusetts assembly, abruptly sailed for England on January 1, 1723, leaving Lieutenant Governor William Dummer to manage Massachusetts involvement in the war.

On August 13, 1723, Gray Lock first entered the war by raiding Northfield, Massachusetts, and four warriors killed two citizens near Northfield. The next day they attacked Joseph Stevens and his four sons in Rutland. Stevens escaped, two boys were killed, and the other two sons were captured.

On October 9, 1723, Gray Lock struck two small forts near Northfield, inflicting casualties and carrying off one captive. In response, Governor Dummer ordered the construction of Fort Dummer where Brattleboro, Vermont is now. The fort became a major base of operations for scouting and punitive expeditions into Abenaki country. Fort Dummer was present-day Vermont's first permanent European settlement, made under the command of Lieutenant Timothy Dwight.

On June 18, 1724, Grey Lock attacked a group of men working in a meadow near Hatfield, Massachusetts. Grey Lock retired from the area and killed men at Deerfield, and Northfield over the summer. In response to the raids, Dummer ordered more soldiers for Northfield, Brookfield, Deerfield and Sunderland. Grey Lock's home village of Woronoke (now Westfield and part of Russell) has no written record of attacks and appears to have gone untouched.

On October 11, 1724, 70 Abenakis attacked Fort Dummer and killed 3 or 4 soldiers.

In September 1725, a scouting party of 6 men was sent out from Fort Dummer. Grey Lock and 14 others ambushed them just west of the Connecticut River, killing two and wounding and capturing three others. One man escaped, while two Indians were killed.
