= Caroline Dana Howe =

American writer (1824–1907)

- Born: Caroline Dana; August 21, 1824; Fryeburg, Maine, U.S.
- Died: October 30, 1907 (aged 83)
- Occupation: writer
- Writing career
- Language: English
- Genres: prose, poetry, hymns
- Notable work: "Leaf by Leaf the Roses Fall"

Caroline Dana Howe (née, Dana; August 21, 1824 - October 30, 1907) was an American writer of prose, poetry, and hymns. Her celebrated song, "Leaf by Leaf the Roses Fall", was claimed and used by several different authors, until her authorship was reasserted, the publishers appending her name to all later editions. A large number of Howe's songs were set to music for which they were easily adapted, and were found in sheet music and in church collections. The songs were gathered into at least 26 collections, and it was said that no living writer in Maine was more favorably known in that day as a writer of songs than Howe. She was also well known as a writer of short serial stories, juvenile sketches, and essays. The Massachusetts Sunday School Society published a book of about 200 pages of hers, carried successfully through several editions.

== Biography ==
Caroline Dana was born in Fryeburg, Maine, August 21, 1824. She resided in Portland, Maine since early childhood. She lived in her home for more than 30 years, sharing it with the family of her nephew. There, she wrote most of the poems that gave her a position among the leading hymn singers. A Massachusetts critic, in enumerating the eight songs by American women of the day, sung everywhere, called attention to the fact that four of them were written in Maine, and one of them, "Leaf by Leaf the Roses Fall", by Howe. This popular song was written by her in 1856, and first published in Gleason's Pictorial. A few years later, it appeared in another Boston paper, set to music, the composer claiming the words as his own. Several other composers were equally unscrupulous, and it was not until after many years that the question of authorship was finally settled, through the efforts of Oliver Ditson, and proper credit given thereafter by various publishers.

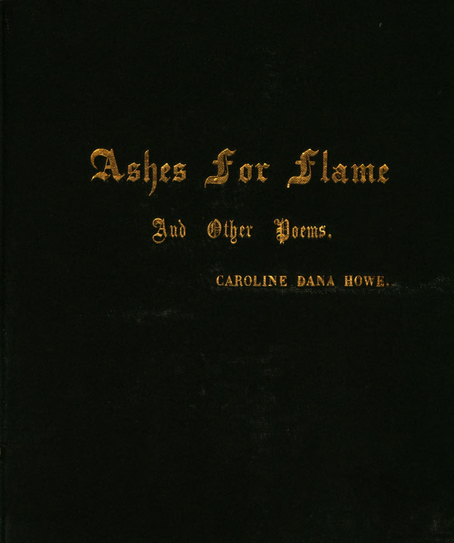
Ashes for Flame

Her first literary work appeared in the Portland Transcript, and in this, as in other leading publications, her contributions of prose and verse were favorably received by the public. In 1862, the Massachusetts Sunday School Society published in book form a story written by her, which passed through several editions. Her verse was characterized by lyric power, by grace of diction, by religious fervor and aspiration, and a sincere heartiness. It was adapted for music, and more than 30 of her hymns and songs were published in collections for church choirs, and in sheet music, becoming very popular. In 1885, a collection of Howe's poems was made under title of "Ashes for Flame and Other Poems".

She died October 30, 1907.

== "Leaf by Leaf the Roses Fall!" ==
Of the poem "Leaf by Leaf the Roses Fall!", Howe said in 1889:

"It was written in Boston in 1856, while under the shadow of a great affliction. As I stood one morning in my friend's rose garden amid the falling blossoms, the thought came to me that all life renewed itself in some form, and that even roses would bloom again in their time. The idea, grounded in my perception, fashioned itself into verse, and "Leaf by Leaf" was written almost without volition as it seemed on my part. It was published in Gleason's Pictorial, and from thence copied widely into various papers, meanwhile being set to music for a Boston publication, the composer claiming the words as his own. This experience has been several times repeated, and twice even, in one magazine of late years. Meanwhile it makes its appearance in the form of sheet music adapted for the piano, becoming very popular and having large sales, this composer also claiming the authorship of the poem. In 1865, on being introduced to Mr. Oliver Ditson as the writer of this song, he immediately desired proof, which, when furnished, he set before the different publishers, and through his efforts credit has been given me in all subsequent editions. I had not thought that the simple 'note of cheer,' sent to me that morning in the rose-garden, would make its way into other hearts or homes. A fine transcription of the song has been made by Wehli, adapted for the piano."

Leaf by leaf the roses fall,
Drop by drop the springs run dry,
One by one, beyond recall,
Summer beauties fade and die;
But the roses bloom again.
And the springs will gush anew
In the pleasant April rain,
And the summer's sun and dew.
So in hours of deepest gloom,
When the springs of gladness fail.
And the roses in their bloom
Droop like maidens wan and pale,
We shall find some hope that lies
Like a silent germ apart,
Hidden far from careless eyes,
In the garden of the heart.
Some sweet hope to gladness wed,
That will spring afresh and new,
When grief's winter shall have fled.
Giving place to sun and dew.
Some sweet hope that breathes of spring,
Through the weary, weary time,
Budding for its blossoming.
In the spirit's silent clime.

== Selected works ==
=== Hymns ===
- Angels clothed in shining raiment
- Like the birds that sing in the early spring
- O prodigal, come, I am waiting
- On the heights why standest thou
- Press nobly on as God has called
- Thine are the rivers: Thine, O God, the power
- Where, where are the dear
