= Paugus Bay =

Lake of the United States of America

- Location within New Hampshire Location within the United States
- Location: Belknap County, New Hampshire
- Coordinates: 43°34′34″N 71°27′33″W
- Primary inflows: Lake Winnipesaukee
- Primary outflows: Winnipesaukee River
- Basin countries: United States
- Max. length: 4.5 mi (7.2 km)
- Max. width: 0.8 mi (1.3 km)
- Surface area: 1,227 acres (4.97 km^{2})
- Average depth: 23 ft (7.0 m)
- Max. depth: 80 ft (24 m)
- Surface elevation: 504 ft (154 m)
- Islands: Plummer Island; Big Island; Little Island
- Settlements: Laconia: Weirs Beach, Lakeport

Paugus Bay is a 1,227-acre (4.97 km^{2}) water body located in Belknap County in the Lakes Region of central New Hampshire, United States, in the city of Laconia. A short channel at its north end connects it with Lake Winnipesaukee in the village of Weirs Beach, and a dam on its southern end separates it from Opechee Bay in the village of Lakeport. The bay is named after Chief Paugus, who fought in the Battle of Pequawket during Dummer's War. The 19th-century construction of the dam in Lakeport raised the elevation of Paugus Bay to that of Lake Winnipesaukee. Water flowing out of Paugus Bay travels down the Winnipesaukee River to the Merrimack River.

The bay is classified as a cold- and warmwater fishery, with observed species including brook trout, rainbow trout, lake trout, land-locked salmon, lake whitefish, smallmouth and largemouth bass, chain pickerel, white perch, black crappie, bluegill, and horned pout.

== See also ==
- List of lakes in New Hampshire
