= Molly Ockett =

Abenaki medicine woman (c.1740-1816)

- Born: Marie Agathe c. 1740; Biddeford, Province of Massachusetts Bay, Thirteen Colonies
- Died: August 2, 1816; East Andover, District of Maine, Massachusetts, United States
- Resting place: Woodlawn Cemetery
- Citizenship: Abenaki
- Known for: Healing abilities and traditional craftsmanship

Molly Ockett (also "Mollyockett", "Mollocket" and "Molly Occut") (born c. 1740, Saco, Maine, died August 2, 1816, Andover, Maine), was a Pequawket Abenaki woman who lived in the regions of northern New Hampshire, Maine and central Quebec during colonial times. She was baptized and given the name Marie Agathe. This became "Mali Agat" when spoken in Abenaki, which sounded like "Molly Ockett" to English-speaking listeners.

== Biography ==
Molly Ockett was born around 1740 in the area now known as Saco, Maine.

Molly Ockett was reputed to be a skilled healer with a singular sense of humor. She is reputed to have saved the life of future Vice President of the United States Hannibal Hamlin when he was an infant. She was well known by European settlers in the area and her name is still attached to numerous locales in the Androscoggin River valley and surrounding territory.

Molly Ockett was skilled in traditional Abenaki crafts and also was known to serve as a midwife.

Her date of death is given as August 2, 1816. She is buried in the Woodlawn Cemetery in Andover, Maine.

== Early life ==
The Abenaki, including Molly's family sided with the English during King George’s war. She was part of the party that traveled with Captain Cutter to Saco falls. After peace talks had been concluded Molly stayed in MA with two other girls when she was between the ages of 5-9. It was likely during this time that she learned to speak English. During the French and Indian War there was a large bounty placed on Abenaki scalps. Because of this she and some other Abenaki went to Canada. There, she settled at St. Francis Mission in Quebec. A short time later, when Molly was around 15 years old, the Mission was raided by Major Robert Rogers Rangers, who killed many and set fire to the Mission. She managed to survive the raid by hiding behind a bush.

Molly disappears from the records until 1764 when she shows up in records from the rebuilt St Francis Mission. There, it is revealed that she was married to fellow Abenaki Piol Susup (Pierre Joseph). She had a daughter who was baptized Marie Marguerite Joseph (Molly Susup).

In 1766 she was with a fellow Pequawket Jean Baptiste Sabattis, but it is unknown whether they ever married. They would eventually have three children together.

== Later Life ==
Molly earned a reputation as a skilled healer, using herbal remedies which she kept a close secret Molly was invited to live with Colonel Clark in her later years as a repayment for saving his life. She became ill in 1816 and died later that year on August 2^{nd}, 1816, in Andover, Maine. Her grave remained unmarked until 1867 when the women from the Congregational Church in Andover raised enough money to put up a marker for her.

== Legacy ==
- Molly Ockett Middle School in Fryeburg, Maine, is named after her.
- Bethel, Maine, once held an annual summer festival titled 'Molly Ockett Day'.
- Molly Ockett Chapter of the Daughters of the American Revolution (DAR) in Bridgton, Maine is named in her honor.
- The Mollyockett Motel is located in Bryant Pond, Maine.
