= Lovewell Pond =

Pond in Fryeburg, Maine, United States

- Location within Maine Location within the United States
- Location: Fryeburg, Maine
- Coordinates: 44°00′21″N 70°55′55″W
- Surface area: 1,120 acres (450 ha)
- Max. depth: 45 feet (14 m)
- Surface elevation: 358 feet (109 m)

Lovewell Pond is a sizable body of water located in southeastern Fryeburg, Maine. It has a moderately developed shoreline with approximately 75-80 buildings, not including approximately 35 others with access rights to the pond's shoreline.

Lovewell Pond is the second largest pond in Oxford County. It is about 1,120 acres (450 ha), slightly smaller than Kezar Pond, which is about 1,299 acres (526 ha). Lovewell Pond does, however, fluctuate largely in size due to its annual flooding phenomenon. It is the drainage basin for many small streams including Fight Brook and Mill/Wards Brook, but mainly the Saco River, which acts as both an inlet and outlet for the pond. When the Saco River floods, the water, which normally flows out, reverses direction and flows into the pond, causing it to rise. Lovewell Pond has an actual drainage area of about 3,101 acres (1,255 ha). This flooding is an unusual characteristic for a pond.

Lovewell Pond has a maximum depth of 45 feet (14 m) during dry season, but can increase by as much as 10 feet (3.0 m), depending on how high the water rises during rainy periods. The water is normally lowest in the summer (August) and highest in the spring (April).

== Temperatures ==
- Surface: 74 °F (23 °C)
- 35-foot (11 m) depth: 60 °F (16 °C)

== Wildlife ==
Lovewell Pond supports many species of warm water fish, including smallmouth bass, largemouth bass, white perch, yellow perch, chain pickerel, pumpkinseed sunfish, minnows, brown trout, lake whitefish, rainbow smelt, burbot (cusk), hornpout (bullhead), golden shiner, common shiner, fallfish (chub), white sucker, and American eel. There are also a few species of turtle and water snake in the pond.

An important issue that is handled with care and effort is the loon population. There have been, and continue to be, many attempts at stabilizing and increasing the loon count on Lovewell Pond, as well as countless other ponds in the Northeast. According to first-hand accounts, there are 9 adult loons on Lovewell Pond and a few chicks. Residents of the pond have hand-built floating nests for the loons to lay their eggs on, in hopes of creating a better chance of survival. Pine Island, the pond's larger island of two, has been closed to the public to create a sanctuary for the loons.

== Public access ==
There is a state-owned boat ramp located at the southeastern corner of the pond, off of Route 113 across from the Eastern Slopes Regional Airport. This ramp is open to the public, and all boats that enter the pond are examined for foreign invasive plant remains from other bodies of water. Lovewell Pond is highly monitored and maintained to prevent invasive plant species from growing and spreading.

== Evergreen Spring ==
Alongside Lovewell Pond, off Route 113, lies Evergreen Spring. This spring is owned and operated by Nestlé and provides water for the Poland Spring water bottling company. The Lovewell Pond Corporation has had several arguments with Nestlé over their being allowed to take so much water. It was thought to lower the ground water level, therefore reducing the amount of fresh water entering the pond. Nestlé won the battles and has not changed their obtaining habits.
