= Deacon Hutchins House =

Historic house in Maine, United States

- U.S. National Register of Historic Places
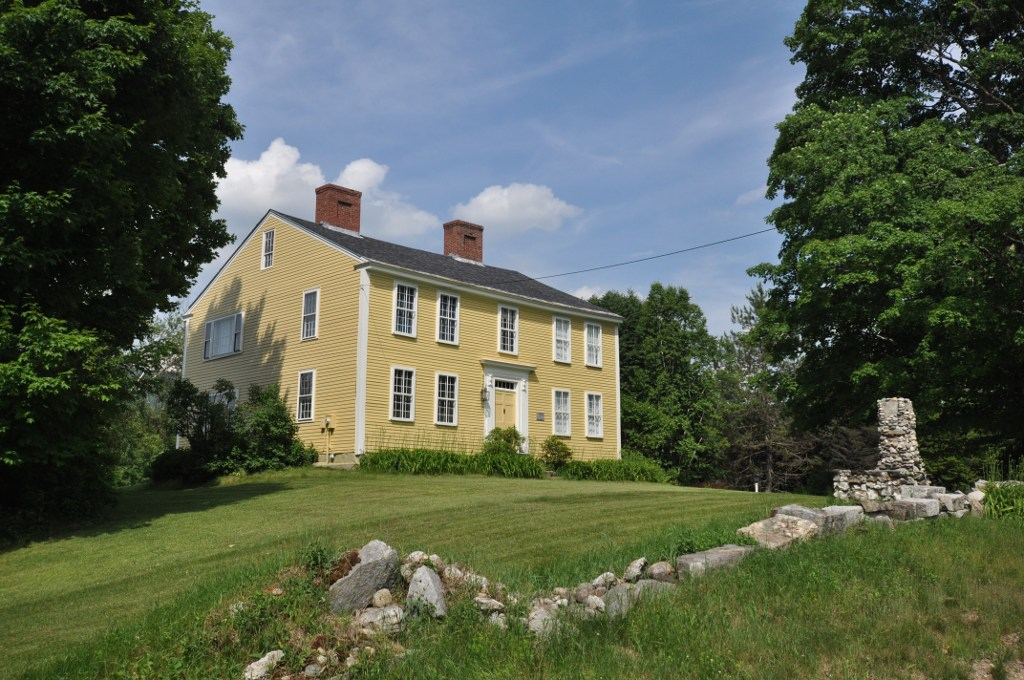

- Location within Maine Location within the United States
- Location: Northwest of Rumford on State Route 5, Rumford, Maine
- Coordinates: 44°32′47″N 70°41′42″W
- Area: 0.5 acres (0.20 ha)
- Built: 1802
- Architectural style: Federal
- NRHP reference No.: 79000159
- Added to NRHP: July 10, 1979

The Deacon Hutchins House is an historic house on Maine State Route 5 in Rumford, Maine. Built c. 1802, it is an excellent example of vernacular Federal style architecture, and is further notable for murals drawn in one room by the itinerant painter Rufus Porter. It was listed on the National Register of Historic Places in 1987.

== Description and history ==
The Hutchins House is 2 1/2-story wood-frame structure, five bays wide, with a gable roof and two substantial brick chimneys placed symmetrical on the roof gable. The main facade, facing southwest, is symmetrical, with a center entry flanked by pilasters and topped by a transom window and lintel entablature. A 1 1/2-story ell extends from the northeast corner of the house. A secondary entry, capped by a gable pediment, is located on the southeast facade.

The house, built c. 1802 for Deacon Hezekiah Hutchins, a New Hampshire native and veteran of the French and Indian and American Revolutionary Wars, who moved to the area in 1801 and was one of the founders of the Congregational church at Rumford Center. He also served as town moderator and as a justice of the peace, indicating his prominence in the community. His house is a well-preserved example of a vernacular Federal style house. The most significant element of the house, however, is the addition c. 1840 of a series of murals in its southeast parlor, drawn by Rufus Porter, who was then at the height of his time as an itinerant painter. In addition to painting on the plastered walls, Porter also applied graining effects to some of the room's woodwork.

== See also ==
- National Register of Historic Places listings in Oxford County, Maine
