= White Mountain Regional Airport =

Coordinates: 43°59′28″N 070°56′52″W

- IATA: FRY; ICAO: KIZG; FAA LID: IZG

Summary
- Airport type: Public
- Owner: Fryeburg, Maine
- Operator: IZG Airport Authority
- Serves: White Mountains
- Elevation AMSL: 454 ft (138 m)
- Website: whitemountainairport.com
- Interactive map of White Mountain Regional Airport

Runways
Direction	Length		Surface
Direction	ft	m	Surface
14/32	4,200	1,280	Asphalt

Statistics (2021)
- Aircraft operations (year ending 8/16/2021): 7,850
- Source: Federal Aviation Administration

White Mountain Regional Airport (IATA: FRY, ICAO: KIZG, FAA LID: IZG), previously Eastern Slope Regional Airport, also known as Eastern Slopes Regional Airport and Fryeburg Airport, is a public airport located three miles (4.8 km) southeast of the central business district of Fryeburg, a town in Oxford County, Maine, United States. It is owned by the Town of Fryeburg. The airport is accessible from Maine State Route 5 in Fryeburg and Brownfield, Maine. It is very close to Conway, New Hampshire.

Although most U.S. airports use the same three-letter location identifier for the FAA and IATA, White Mountain Regional Airport is assigned IZG by the FAA and FRY by the IATA.

== History ==
The airport was built to one day replace White Mountain Airport in North Conway, which closed in 1981 and was replaced by Settlers Green outlet shopping center.

Until 2004, the airport served very little purpose except to Dearborn Precision Tubular Products, which used it as a cargo stop. In 2004, Eastern Slopes Aviation began to try to secure funding for development at the airport, including the construction of a terminal and the establishment of commuter service from the airport to Portland, Maine, slated to begin in spring 2006. The airport handled 12,605 passengers in 2004.

== Facilities and aircraft ==
White Mountain Regional Airport covers an area of 533 acres (216 ha) which contains one runway designated 14/32 with a 4,200 ft × 75 ft (1,280 m × 23 m) asphalt surface. For the 12-month period ending August 16, 2021, the airport had 7,850 aircraft operations, an average of 21 per day: 96% general aviation (7,500), 3% air taxi and 2% military.

== Airlines (passenger and cargo) ==
- Eastern Slopes Aviation (Boston's Logan, Portland)
- Linear Air (Air Charter Boston Hanscom, Bedford)

=== Historical Service ===
- 1952–present: Eastern Slopes Aviation
- 2006: Saco Airlines

== See also ==
- List of airports in Maine
