= Joseph Frye =

Military leader (1712–1794)

Joseph Frye (March 19, 1712 – July 25, 1794) was a military leader from colonial Massachusetts.

== Life ==
Born in Andover, Massachusetts, he obtained the rank of general in the Massachusetts militia after serving in King George's War and the French and Indian War.

During the latter conflict, under the command of Edward Winslow, Frye helped build Fort Halifax in present-day Maine and then participated in the Battle of Fort Beauséjour and the Battle of Petitcodiac. He reported to have barely escaped with his life from a French-allied Native massacre of British forces after having surrendered Fort William Henry. He was commander at Fort Gaspareaux.

He was present on Lake George in August 1757 at the Siege of Fort William Henry. Then he returned to Nova Scotia and took command of Fort Cumberland. He served in the 2nd General Assembly of Nova Scotia in 1759–1760, representing Cumberland Township.

For services during that conflict, the Massachusetts General Court in 1762 granted him a township on the Saco River which had once been the Sokokis Abenaki village of Pequawket. In 1777, the plantation was incorporated as Fryeburg, Maine, named in his honor.

Frye is best known for the role he played expanding the colonial frontier into lands formerly held by both the French and Abenakis. He is regarded as the successor of John Lovewell, and also an enemy of Molly Ockett, leader and sage among dispossessed Algonquian peoples.

Frye served in the early stages of the American Revolutionary War, first as a major general of Massachusetts militia, and then briefly as a brigadier general in the Continental Army. He resigned on 23 April 1776, because his age made him ill-suited for active duty.

== Family and legacy ==
Joseph Frye married Mehitable sometime before the birth of Joseph Jr on 17 July 1733. Samuel followed in 1735, and then Mehitable in April 1738, who died young, and was replaced by another Mehitable in May 1739, who died within the month. Mehitable Frye was born in April 1741. In the interim, Joseph Jr died and was replaced by another in July 1743. Tabitha followed in 1744, and next Hannah in 1748. Richard was born in 1751 to the Captain, and then Nathaniel in 1753. In the meantime, Samuel had expired and was replaced by another in 1758, this one born to the Colonel.

== Legacy ==
He is the namesake of Frye Island, Maine, and the aforementioned Fryeburg, Maine.

== External sources ==
- Joseph Frye: Maine Proprietor and Soldier
- Collections of the Maine Historical Society By Maine Historical Society (1891 Original from the University of Michigan)
