= Chief Paugus =

Chief of the Pequawket tribe

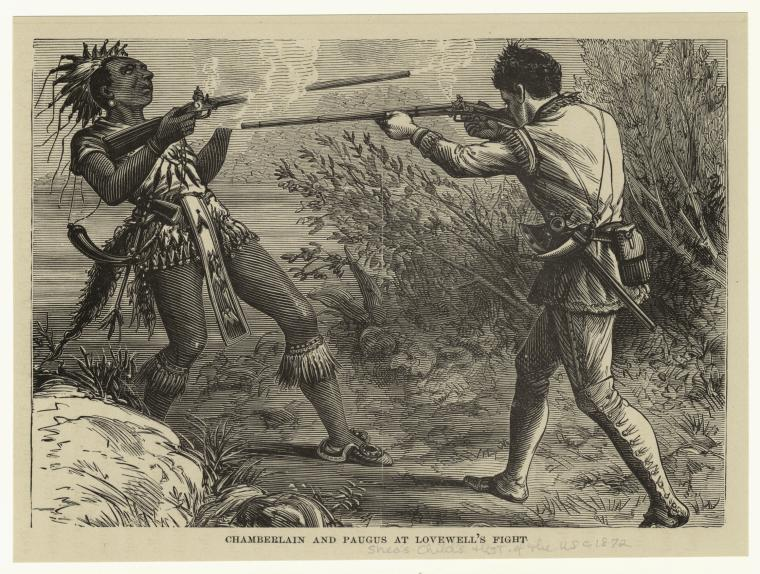
Death of Chief Paugus

Paugus was chief of the Pequawket tribe which lived along the Saco River in present-day Conway, New Hampshire, and Fryeburg, Maine. He was killed at the Battle of Pequawket in 1725 during Dummer's War.

Paugus translates into English as "The Oak". Paugus Bay and Mount Paugus in New Hampshire were named for him.

== See also ==
- Battle of Pequawket
