= Pequawket =

Historic Native American tribe

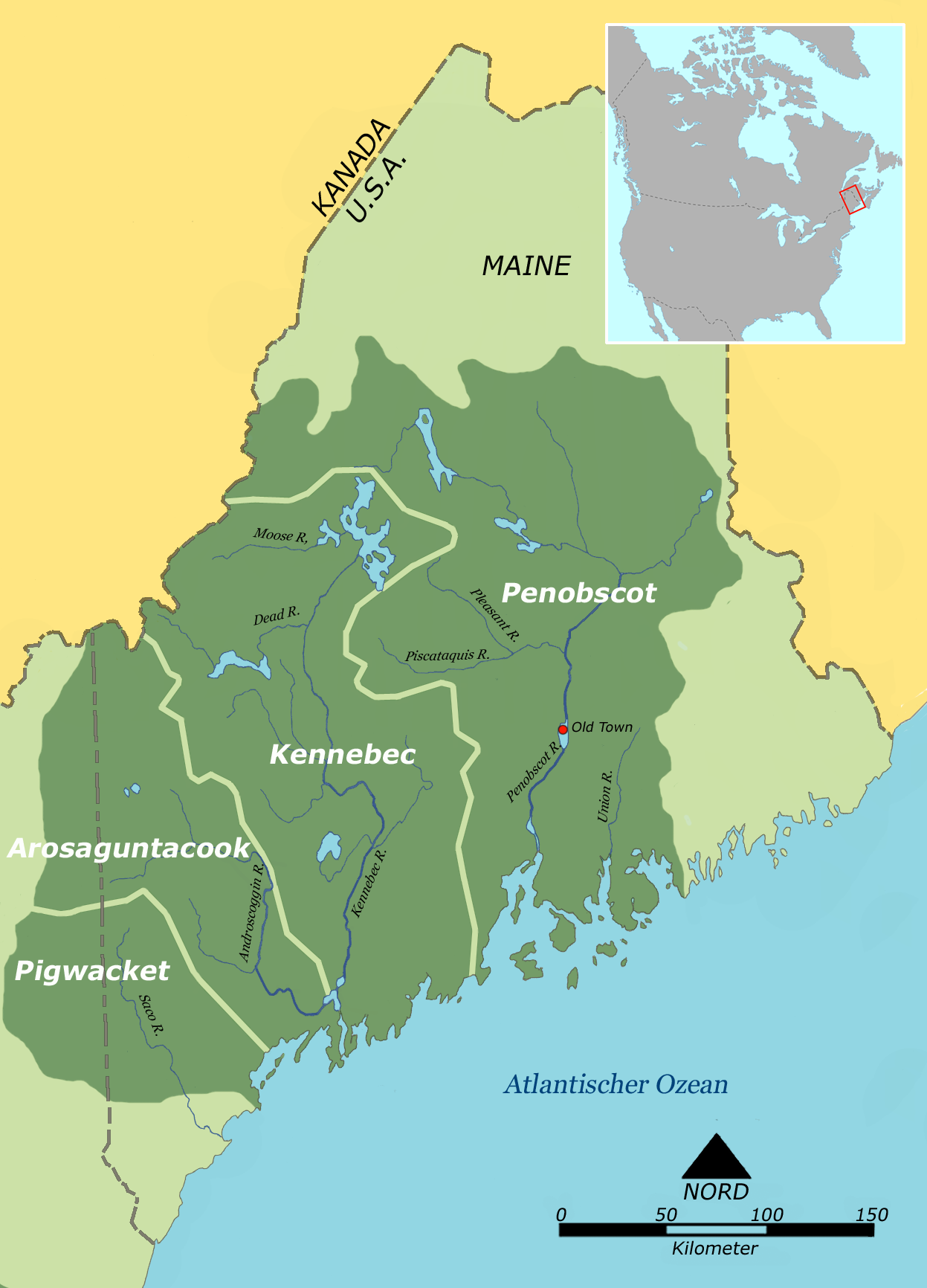
- Approximate original location of the Pequawket (Pigwacket) and other Abenaki groups, ca.

Total population
- 0 (early 19th century)

Regions with significant populations
- New Hampshire, Maine

Religion
- Indigenous religion

Related ethnic groups
- Other Abenaki peoples

The Pequawket were a Native American band of Abenaki people. In the 18th century, they lived in New Hampshire and Maine.

== Territory ==
The Pequawket lived near the headwaters of the Saco River and near what is now Carroll County, New Hampshire and Oxford County, Maine. Their primary town, also called Pequawket, was near Fryeburg, Maine.

== Name ==
The etymology of Pequawket is disputed but might come from pekwakik, which translates "at the hole in the ground".

Their name is also spelled 'Pigwacket and many other spelling variants, and Dean Snow suggests it may have come from Eastern Abenaki apíkwahki, "land of hollows").

== History ==
=== 18th century ===
On April 16, 1725, the Pequawket fought the Battle at Pequawket against Captain John Lovewell and 50 English troops. The Pequawket killed Lovewell; however, the British killed Chief Paugus. After that skirmish, the Pequawket and the Arosaguntacook withdrew to the Connecticut River. The Arosaguntacook migrated north to Canada, where they settled in Saint-François-du-Lac, Quebec, while the Pequawket stayed there through the American Revolutionary War. Some returned to their homeland in the late 18th century.

== Notable Pequawket ==
- Nescambious, an 18th-century Pequawket chief
- Molly Ockett (ca. 1740–1816), herbal healer and craftswomen

== See also ==
- Battle of Pequawket
- Pequawket Brook
