= Dunstable, New Hampshire =

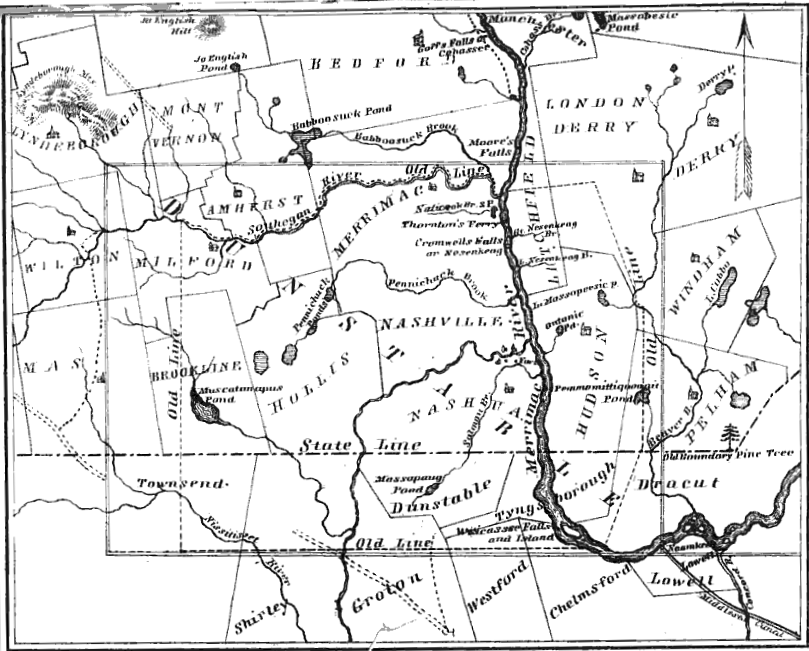
Map of old Dunstable, 1846

Dunstable, New Hampshire was a town located in Hillsborough County, New Hampshire. It has been divided into several current cities and towns, including Nashua, Hollis, Hudson, Litchfield, and Merrimack.

The town was originally part of a larger town of Dunstable, Massachusetts, when Massachusetts stretched from Rhode Island up to Maine. The original tract of land was bisected by the Merrimack River, an important route for the lucrative fur and log trade. Dunstable was incorporated as a township in 1673. On July 3, 1706, during Queen Anne's War, tribes of the Wabanaki Confederacy raided the town, killing nine while seven of the natives were killed.

When the New Hampshire-Massachusetts border was surveyed and adjusted in 1741, the northern part of the town was determined to be in New Hampshire, and was incorporated as a New Hampshire town in 1746. Both the northern New Hampshire half and the southern Massachusetts half prospered, and various villages were formed along the Merrimack, but also along Salmon Brook, the Nashua River, Pennichuck Brook, and the Souhegan River, which also ran through the tract.

Over the years, other towns were formed from parts of the original area on both sides of the state line, and in 1836 the remaining part that still bore the name of "Dunstable, New Hampshire" was renamed "Nashua", after the name of the river that flowed into the Merrimack at the location then referred to as "Indian Head". Six years later Nashua split into "Nashville" and "Nashua", but in 1853 they rejoined and became the "City of Nashua". The name Nashville is preserved in the city's Nashville Historic District, and the name Dunstable can still be found in the streets "New Dunstable Road", "Main Dunstable Road", and "East Dunstable Road" .
