= Fryeburg, Maine =

Town in Maine, United States

- Town
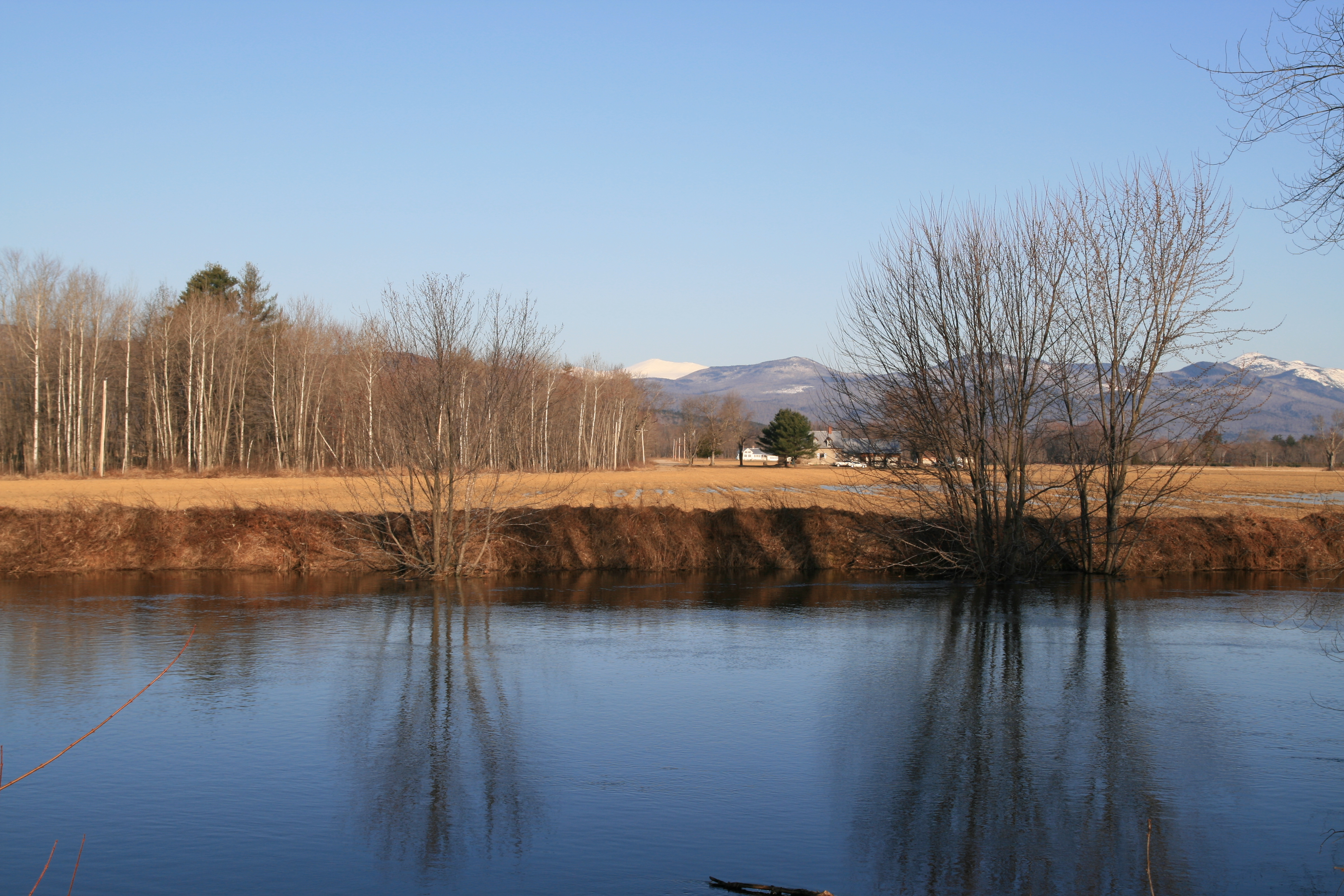
- Saco River and White Mountains

- Coat of arms
- Motto: "The Oldest Town in Oxford County"
- Location within Maine Location within the United States
- Coordinates: 44°03′20″N 70°58′32″W
- Country: United States
- State: Maine
- County: Oxford
- Incorporated: 1777
- Named after: Joseph Frye

Area
  - Total: 65.89 sq mi (170.65 km^{2})
  - Land: 58.33 sq mi (151.07 km^{2})
  - Water: 7.56 sq mi (19.58 km^{2})
- Elevation: 381 ft (116 m)

Population (2020)
  - Total: 3,369
  - Density: 58/sq mi (22.3/km^{2})
- Time zone: UTC-5 (Eastern (EST))
  - Summer (DST): UTC-4 (EDT)
- ZIP Code: 04037
- Area code: 207
- GNIS feature ID: 582485
- Website: www.fryeburgmaine.org

Fryeburg is a town in Oxford County, Maine, United States. The population was 3,369 at the 2020 census. It contains the census-designated place of the same name. Fryeburg is home to Fryeburg Academy, a semi-private preparatory school, and the International Musical Arts Institute. The town is also site of the Fryeburg Fair, which each October attracts approximately 300,000 visitors.

== History ==
The area was once a major Abenaki Indigenous peoples of the Americas village known as Pequawket, meaning "crooked place," a reference to the large bend in the Saco River. It was inhabited by the Sokokis tribe, whose territory along the stream extended from what is now Saco on the coast, to Conway, New Hampshire in the White Mountains. In 1706, Chief Nescambious would be the only Native knighted by the French, who referred to Pequawket as Pégouaki. For a while the tribe was not hostile to English settlements, even hiring British carpenters to build at Pequawket a 14-foot (4.3 m) high palisade fort as protection against their traditional enemy, the Mohawks. In 1713, Sokokis sachems signed the Treaty of Portsmouth to ensure peace with English colonists. Eventually, relations with the English soured. During Father Rale's War, Pequawket was attacked in the Battle at Pequawket on May 8, 1725, by John Lovewell and his militia. Lovewell was killed, as were Chief Paugus and others. The tribe subsequently abandoned the village and moved to Canada.

The township was granted on March 3, 1762, by the Massachusetts General Court to Colonel Joseph Frye of Andover, Massachusetts. Colonists called it Pigwacket, a corruption of its former name. The first permanent settlement was in 1763 by Nathaniel Smith and his family from Concord, New Hampshire, though it is said that John Stevens, Nathaniel Merrill and a slave named Limbo spent the winter of 1762 here. Many pioneers were veterans of the French and Native Wars. When a portion of the grant was discovered to lie in New Hampshire, replacement land was granted as Fryeburg Addition in what is now part of Stow. On the eve of American independence, the Province of Massachusetts Bay granted township privileges to Fryeburg. These were recognized and validated by the Continental Massachusetts government on January 11, 1777, when Fryeburg was incorporated.

It began as a strategic frontier outpost, and the earliest town in the White Mountain region. Excellent soil helped Fryeburg develop into a prosperous agricultural center, and the first gristmill was established using Saco River water power in 1766. Other mills and factories produced lumber, leather, harness, tinware, cheese and canned vegetables. After the Civil War, the Portland and Ogdensburg Railroad passed through town, bringing tourists escaping the heat and pollution of cities. Inns, hotels and boarding houses were built. Tourists began arriving by automobile after designation of the Theodore Roosevelt International Highway in 1919 (identified as United States Route 302 since 1935). Fryeburg is today a year-round resort area. It is also an academic town. Fryeburg Academy, a private preparatory school, was founded in 1792. Before his career as a statesman, Daniel Webster taught for a year at the school, one of the oldest of its type in the nation. In 1924, Dr. Abraham Krasker founded Indian Acres Camp For Boys. Two years later, Dr. Krasker's wife Gertrude founded Forest Acres Camp For Girls. In 1997, the International Musical Arts Institute was founded at Fryeburg.

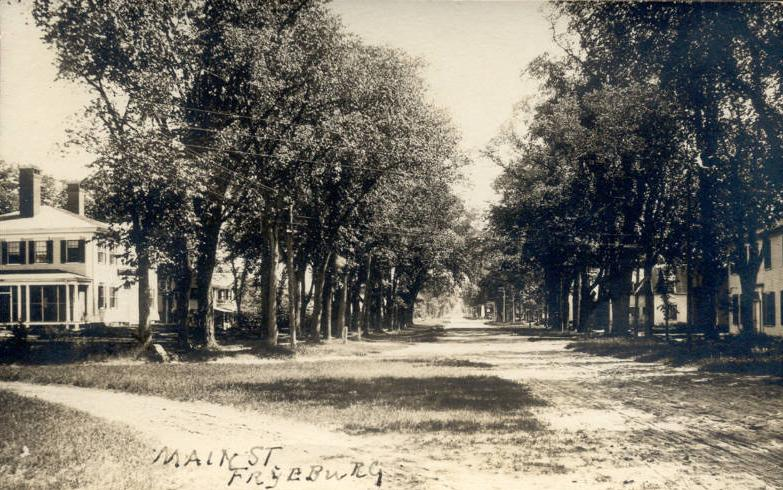
Main Street c. 1910

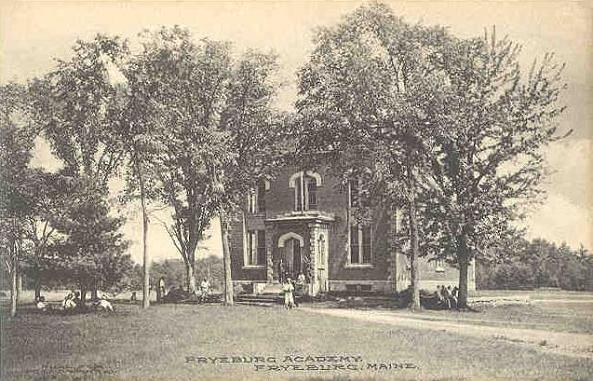
Fryeburg Academy in 1913

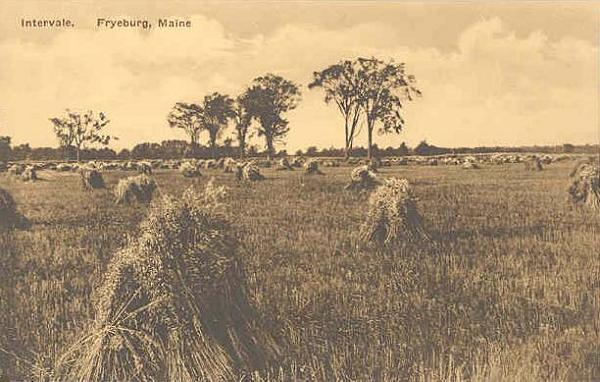
Intervale c. 1920

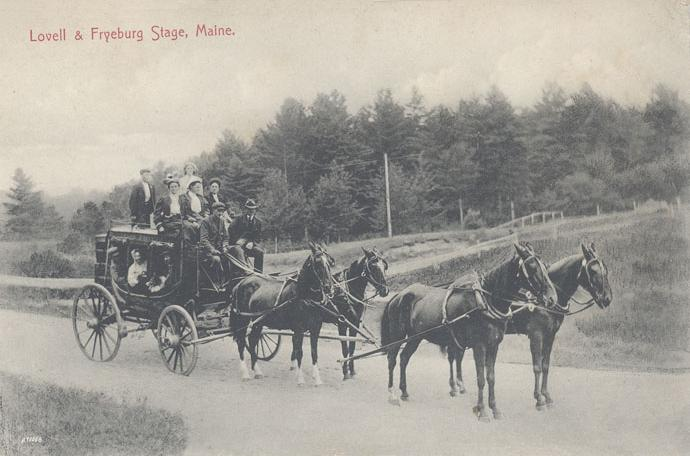
Lovell & Fryeburg stage c. 1913

== Geography ==
According to the United States Census Bureau, the town has a total area of 65.89 square miles (170.65 km^{2}), of which 58.33 square miles (151.07 km^{2}) is land and 7.56 square miles (19.58 km^{2}) is water. Located beside the New Hampshire border, Fryeburg is drained by the Saco River.

The town is served by U.S. Route 302, Maine State Route 5 and Maine State Route 113.

=== Climate ===
This climatic region is typified by large seasonal temperature differences, with warm to occasionally hot and humid summers and long cold (often bitterly so) winters. According to the Köppen Climate Classification system, Fryeburg has a humid continental climate, abbreviated "Dfb" on climate maps. The hottest temperature recorded in Fryeburg was 101 °F (38.3 °C) on July 22, 2011 and June 24, 2025, while the coldest temperature recorded was −32 °F (−35.6 °C) on January 16, 2009.

Climate data for Eastern Slopes Regional Airport, Maine, 1991–2020 normals, extremes 1996–present
Month	Jan	Feb	Mar	Apr	May	Jun	Jul	Aug	Sep	Oct	Nov	Dec	Year
Record high °F (°C)	66 (19)	70 (21)	87 (31)	94 (34)	96 (36)	101 (38)	101 (38)	100 (38)	99 (37)	87 (31)	77 (25)	71 (22)	101 (38)
Mean maximum °F (°C)	52.9 (11.6)	52.6 (11.4)	62.4 (16.9)	79.6 (26.4)	90.0 (32.2)	91.9 (33.3)	93.4 (34.1)	91.9 (33.3)	88.9 (31.6)	77.6 (25.3)	66.9 (19.4)	55.1 (12.8)	95.5 (35.3)
Mean daily maximum °F (°C)	30.5 (−0.8)	33.7 (0.9)	42.1 (5.6)	55.6 (13.1)	68.4 (20.2)	76.9 (24.9)	81.8 (27.7)	80.6 (27.0)	72.7 (22.6)	59.4 (15.2)	46.6 (8.1)	35.7 (2.1)	57.0 (13.9)
Daily mean °F (°C)	18.7 (−7.4)	21.3 (−5.9)	30.5 (−0.8)	42.9 (6.1)	54.9 (12.7)	64.0 (17.8)	69.1 (20.6)	67.3 (19.6)	59.2 (15.1)	47.3 (8.5)	36.0 (2.2)	25.2 (−3.8)	44.7 (7.1)
Mean daily minimum °F (°C)	6.9 (−13.9)	8.9 (−12.8)	19.0 (−7.2)	30.1 (−1.1)	41.5 (5.3)	51.0 (10.6)	56.4 (13.6)	54.0 (12.2)	45.7 (7.6)	35.2 (1.8)	25.5 (−3.6)	14.7 (−9.6)	32.4 (0.2)
Mean minimum °F (°C)	−19.7 (−28.7)	−13.8 (−25.4)	−7.9 (−22.2)	16.3 (−8.7)	27.2 (−2.7)	37.6 (3.1)	45.1 (7.3)	41.9 (5.5)	30.0 (−1.1)	20.6 (−6.3)	7.3 (−13.7)	−8.9 (−22.7)	−22.7 (−30.4)
Record low °F (°C)	−32 (−36)	−24 (−31)	−23 (−31)	7 (−14)	22 (−6)	29 (−2)	38 (3)	35 (2)	20 (−7)	13 (−11)	−9 (−23)	−28 (−33)	−32 (−36)
Average precipitation inches (mm)	3.36 (85)	2.94 (75)	3.60 (91)	4.46 (113)	3.69 (94)	4.13 (105)	3.88 (99)	3.58 (91)	4.04 (103)	4.73 (120)	4.35 (110)	4.15 (105)	46.91 (1,191)
Average precipitation days (≥ 0.01 in)	10.6	9.7	10.8	11.5	13.3	14.5	14.1	13.6	11.0	12.0	10.9	12.0	144
Source 1: NOAA
Source 2: National Weather Service (mean maxima/minima 2006–2020)

== Demographics ==
Historical population
Census	Pop.	Note	%±
1810	1,004		—
1820	1,057		5.3%
1830	1,352		27.9%
1840	1,536		13.6%
1850	1,523		−0.8%
1860	1,623		6.6%
1870	1,507		−7.1%
1880	1,633		8.4%
1890	1,418		−13.2%
1900	1,376		−3.0%
1910	1,282		−6.8%
1920	1,283		0.1%
1930	1,592		24.1%
1940	1,726		8.4%
1950	1,926		11.6%
1960	1,874		−2.7%
1970	2,208		17.8%
1980	2,715		23.0%
1990	2,968		9.3%
2000	3,083		3.9%
2010	3,449		11.9%
2020	3,369		−2.3%
U.S. Decennial Census

=== 2010 census ===
As of the census of 2010, there were 3,449 people, 1,368 households, and 920 families living in the town. The population density was 59.1 inhabitants per square mile (22.8/km^{2}). There were 1,844 housing units at an average density of 31.6 per square mile (12.2/km^{2}). The racial makeup of the town was 94.4% White, 0.6% African American, 0.2% Native American, 2.9% Asian, 0.3% from other races, and 1.7% from two or more races. Hispanic or Latino of any race were 1.4% of the population.

There were 1,368 households, of which 30.8% had children under the age of 18 living with them, 49.8% were married couples living together, 12.6% had a female householder with no husband present, 4.8% had a male householder with no wife present, and 32.7% were non-families. 26.5% of all households were made up of individuals, and 11.1% had someone living alone who was 65 years of age or older. The average household size was 2.40 and the average family size was 2.86.

The median age in the town was 44 years. 22.9% of residents were under the age of 18; 8.3% were between the ages of 18 and 24; 19.7% were from 25 to 44; 33% were from 45 to 64; and 16.1% were 65 years of age or older. The gender makeup of the town was 48.4% male and 51.6% female.

=== 2000 census ===
As of the census of 2000, there were 3,083 people, 1,245 households, and 841 families living in the town. The population density was 52.8 inhabitants per square mile (20.4/km^{2}). There were 1,648 housing units at an average density of 28.2 per square mile (10.9/km^{2}). The racial makeup of the town was 98.15% White, 0.32% Black or African American, 0.13% Native American, 0.23% Asian, 0.16% Pacific Islander, 0.16% from other races, and 0.84% from two or more races. Hispanic or Latino of any race were 1.17% of the population.

In the town, the population was spread out, with 23.5% under the age of 18, 6.5% from 18 to 24, 26.0% from 25 to 44, 28.3% from 45 to 64, and 15.7% who were 65 years of age or older. The median age was 42 years. For every 100 females, there were 91.0 males. For every 100 females age 18 and over, there were 89.6 males.

The median income for a household in the town was $34,333, and the median income for a family was $40,128. Males had a median income of $26,469 versus $20,486 for females. The per capita income for the town was $18,658. About 9.7% of families and 11.6% of the population were below the poverty line, including 11.6% of those under age 18 and 11.9% of those age 65 or over.

== Sites of interest ==
- Jockey Cap Rock is a granite glacial erratic by the Saco River. Arctic explorer Robert Peary lived in Fryeburg from 1878 to 1879 and a made a profile survey of the hills and mountains visible from the top of this rock. His boyhood friend, Alfred E. Burton, suggested that the profile survey be made into a monument. The survey was cast in bronze and set on a granite cylinder, and was dedicated to his memory by the Peary Family in 1938. A hiking trail of half a mile leads visitors to the summit of the rock and the monument.
- Fryeburg Fair Farm Museum
- Fryeburg Historical Society & Museum

== Education ==
Fryeburg is part of Maine School Administrative District #72. Jay Robinson is the current Superintendent.

Schools in this district include Brownfield-Denmark, Brownfield Consolidated School (former school, now the Brownfield Community Center), Molly Ockett, New Suncook School and Fryeburg Academy.

== Transportation and commerce ==
U.S. Route 302 in Fryeburg is the second largest point of entry for highway traffic into the state of Maine, next to Interstate 95 in Kittery.

The town hosts a small airport, called Eastern Slopes Regional Airport. It is the home of Dearborn Precision Tubular Products, a major manufacturer of precision tubular products. It is also home to Har-Mac Steel, a manufacturer of structural reinforcing materials for the construction industry. Their products are being used in the construction of tunnels, bridges and major buildings in locations such as Chicago, New York and Puerto Rico.

== Notable people ==
- Anna Barrows, early 20th century cooking lecturer
- Charles S. Benton, US congressman
- Nathaniel S. Benton, politician
- John W. Dana, governor of Maine
- Judah Dana, US senator
- Marty Engstrom, Weather presenter & television personality
- Joseph Frye, military leader and colonizer
- Spalding Gray, actor, author
- David Hastings, state senator
- Caroline Dana Howe (1824–1907), writer of prose, poetry, and hymns
- Eastman Johnson, artist
- Jigger Johnson, logger
- Clarence E. Mulford, creator of Hopalong Cassidy
- Nescambious, Abenaki tribal chief
- James R. Osgood, publisher
- Robert Peary, Arctic explorer
- James W. Ripley, US congressman
- Eric Rosenblith, violinist
- Mark Walker, state legislator
- Daniel Webster, US senator and secretary of state
- James S. Wiley, US congressman
