= List of historic Black churches in Cleveland =

This list of historic Black churches in Cleveland, Ohio, consists of buildings owned by congregations which are majority Black and which have architectural significance. The congregation may be historic, or the building, or historic events may have occurred there. This list is incomplete; other structures could be identified in the future.

Name	Address	Congregation Founded	Image	Building Erected	Architect	Style	Historic Events
Advent Evangelical Lutheran Church	15309 Harvard Ave.	1960		1965	William Whitley and James Whitley	Mid-century modern	First predominantly Black Lutheran church in Cleveland; Cleveland Historic Landmark
Antioch Baptist Church	8869 Cedar Ave.	1893		1893—1894 (Note: The structure was built for Bolton Avenue Presbyterian Church. Cedar Avenue Baptist Church purchased the building in 1923, after Bolton Avenue merged with Calvary Presbyterian Church. Antioch Baptist Church originally occupied a building at 2421 Central Ave. in Cleveland. It purchased the Cedar Avenue Baptist Church building in November 1934.)	William Warren Sabin	Romanesque Revival	Building designated a Cleveland Historic Landmark, 1975; history of political and economic activism, including founding one of the earliest Black-owned credit unions in 1947; establishment of the Antioch Development Corporation in 1999, the first Christian church in the United States to open an HIV/AIDS testing center, 1999; establishment of the Genesis Program in 2001 to provide skills training and employment services for the poor
Cory United Methodist Church	1117 E. 105th St.	1875		1921—1922 (Note: Anshe Emeth, a Jewish congregation, began planning the structure in October 1919. The cornerstone for the building containing the auditorium, social hall, meeting rooms, school, and gymnasium, was laid in February 1921, while the cornerstone for the synagogue was laid in July 1921. The secular section, except for the gym, was completed in July 1921, but the synagogue was not finished until October 1922. Cory United Methodist Church acquired the building in March 1947.)	Albert S. Janowitz	Neoclassical	Key meeting place in Cleveland during the civil rights movement; The Rev. Martin Luther King Jr. spoke there in May 1963; Malcolm X first gave his "The Ballot or the Bullet" speech there on April 3, 1964; first marker erected on the Cleveland Civil Rights Trail; Cleveland Historic Landmark
East Mount Zion Baptist Church	9990 Euclid Ave.	1908		1906—1908 (Note: The structure was built for Euclid Avenue Christian Church. East Mount Zion Baptist Church purchased it in December 1955.)	George W. Kramer and C.C. Hamilton	Romanesque Revival	The first Black church on Euclid Avenue, once an all-white enclave known as Millionaires' Row; major player in the civil rights movement in Cleveland and a force for ending racial discrimination in education, employment, and housing; oldest food bank in Cleveland; featured in the 2022 documentary film 100th & Cedar; Cleveland Historic Landmark
Fellowship Missionary Baptist Church	1754 E. 55th St.	1964		1907—1908 (Note: The structure was built in 1908 for Grace Evangelical Lutheran Church. Grace Lutheran moved to Cleveland Heights, and sold the building in October 1925 to an Assembly of God congregation. The Assembly of God congregation sold to Fellowship Missionary Baptist Church about the end of 1963 or in early 1964.)	Bohnard & Parsson	English Gothic Revival	Structure added to the National Register of Historic Places in 2025; Cleveland Historic Landmark
Greater Abyssinia Baptist Church	1161 E. 105th St.	1946		1919 (Note: The structure was begun in June 1919 and built by a Jewish congregations, Beth Hamidrash Hagodol Beth Israel. Construction was nearly complete by August 15, at which time the building was dedicated. The worship space was completed about September 18. Greater Abyssinia Baptist Church purchased the building in June 1946.)	Allen Sogg	Byzantine Revival	Pastor E.T. Caviness (1961-present) is a civil rights leader, honored by the International Civil Rights Walk of Fame; church was a hub for civil rights activism; church was the headquarters of the United Freedom Movement; congregation was a significant factor in helping Carl Stokes become the first Black mayor of Cleveland in 1967; site recognized on the Cleveland Civil Rights Trail; Cleveland Historic Landmark; hosted the Rev. Martin Luther King Jr. the week after he won the Nobel Peace Prize
Greater Friendship Baptist Church	12305 Arlington Ave.	1955		1926 (Note: The structure was built for the First Evangelical Church in 1926. Greater Friendship Baptist Church purchased the building from that congregation in October 1967.)	Corbusier, Lenski & Foster	Gothic Revival	One of four Black churches in Cleveland visited by the Rev. Martin Luther King Jr. on May 14, 1963, after his release from Birmingham Jail; The Rev. C.T. Nelson recorded "Great Consolation"/"A Prayer" there in 1966, a reproduction of Sunday worship service that was one of the few worship service hits on gospel radio in the 1960s; Cleveland Historic Landmark
Lane Metropolitan Christian Methodist Episcopal Church	2131 E. 46th St.	1902		1899—1901 (Note: The building was constructed for the First Church of Christ, Scientist. The cornerstone was laid in December 1899, but it was not completed until December 1901. Lane Metropolitan CME Church purchased the building in 1919.)	George F. Hammond	Neoclassical	Founded by the influential CME bishop, Isaac Lane; by 1940, was one of the two largest CME congregations in the United States; pastored by Joseph C. Coles Jr. from 1952 to 1963, during which time Coles gained national prominence; pastored by the Rev. Anzo Montgomery, a civil rights leader, from 1965 to 1978; Cleveland Historic Landmark
Liberty Hill Baptist Church	8206 Euclid Ave.	1918		1911—1912 (Note: The structure was built by Anshe Chesed Congregation and completed in March 1912. Liberty Hill Baptist Church purchased the building from Anshe Chesed in January 1956.)	Lehman & Schmitt	mixed Moorish Revival and Romanesque Revival	Structure has eight stained glass windows designed and created by Tiffany Studios, a mosaic designed and created by Tiffany Studios, and a dome whose interior is clad in sky-blue Ludowici tile; concert by Mahalia Jackson in October 1961 to raised funds for the Rev. Martin Luther King Jr.; hosted the Citizens' Committee for Review, which examined the causes of the 1966 Hough riots; Cleveland Historic Landmark
Mt. Zion Congregational Church	10723 Magnolia Dr.	1864		1955—1956 (Note: Early 1954, Mt. Zion Congregational Church purchased the Grandin Mansion on Magnolia Avenue in Cleveland, intending to renovate the structure into a church. The mansion was bombed twice on the evening of March 25, 1954, by white segregationists. The Mt. Zion Congregation not only resolved to stay at Grandin Mansion, but to build an even larger church next to it. Ground on the new building was broken on September 30, 1955, and the new structure completed exactly a year later.)	Carr & Cunningham	Contemporary	Founded as a church for Black elites in Cleveland; by 1916, one of only three Black churches in Ohio to belong to a predominantly white denomination; pastored by Russell S. Brown from 1925 to 1933, the second African American to serve on the Cleveland City Council (elected 1929); bombed twice by segregationists in 1954; designated by the Cleveland City Council as a contributing building to the Magnolia-Wade Park Historic District
New Life at Calvary Presbyterian Church	2020 E. 79th St.	1880		1888—1890	Charles F. Schweinfurth	Victorian Romanesque Revival	The then-predominantly white congregation formally took a stand against racial segregation in 1953; became one of the first racially integrated congregations in Cleveland by reaching out to local Black residents; partnered with the Hough Area Council to foster improved race relations and stability in the Hough neighborhood at a time of extreme demographic change; known for its youth programs in the 1950s and 1960s; key Cleveland area advocate for racial tolerance and social justice in the 1950s and 1960s; in the 21st century, still the largest predominantly African American church in Ohio; Cleveland Historic Landmark
Olivet Institutional Baptist Church	8712 Quincy Ave.	1931		1950—1954	Not known	Modern	Physically, the largest Black church in Ohio built by its own congregation at the time; while pastored by the Rev. Odie Hoover (1952 to 1973), the congregation challenged racism early, when the civil rights movement did not have widespread support; building served as the Rev. Martin Luther King Jr.'s informal headquarters when he was in Cleveland; Olivet welcomed Dr. King at a time when most churches would not do so; established the Christian Community Center as a place for music and the arts, community organizing, and civil rights activism; church played a key role in voter registration and mobilization in the election of Carl Stokes as Cleveland's first Black mayor; a major supporter of Operation Breadbasket, which boosted Black-owned businesses; The Rev. Otis Moss Jr. (1974 to 2008), an important early figure in the civil rights movement, served as chair of the board of People United to Save Humanity (PUSH); congregation led the way in building the electoral coalition that elected Michael White mayor of Cleveland in 1990; congregation partnered with University Hospitals to build the Otis Moss Jr.—University Hospitals Health Center in 1997; site recognized on the Cleveland Civil Rights Trail
St. Adalbert Catholic Church	2347 East 83rd St.	1922 (Note: St. Adalbert Parish was erected in 1883, and primarily served a congregation of white, ethnically Bohemians. Our Lady of the Blessed Sacrament Parish was erected in 1922, and primarily served an African American congregation. Our Lady of the Blessed Sacrament Catholic Church was built at 2350 E. 79th Street, and dedicated in June 1923. By the late 1950s, Our Lady of the Blessed Sacrament Church was in very poor condition but had a large congregation. St. Adalbert Parish had an excellent physical plant, but extremely few parishioners. The diocese merged the two in February 1961.)		1911—1912 (Note: This refers to the construction of St. Adalbert Church.)	William P. Ginther	Baroque Revival	Oldest predominantly Black Catholic parish in the state of Ohio, and the second oldest in the United States; Cleveland Historic Landmark
St. Andrew's Episcopal Church	2171 E. 49th St.	1892		1915—1916	Charles Schneider	Gothic Revival	Founded as a church for Black elites in Cleveland; co-founded by John Patterson Green, first Black person elected to city office in Cleveland and to the Ohio Senate, and founder of Labor Day in Ohio; co-founded by wealthy Cleveland seafood wholesaler Jacob E. Reed; co-founded by Richard A. Jones, editor of the Negro Globe newspaper; Cleveland Historic Landmark
St. James African Methodist Episcopal	8401 Cedar Ave.	1889		1895—1896 (Note: The structure was erected for Trinity Congregational Church, and completed in March 1896. Trinity sold to St. James AME in November 1925. The structure was gutted by fire in January 1938, with the loss of the roof and interior. The rebuilt structure dedicated in May 1941. The church was gutted by fire again in March 1950, with only the front facade and two side walls saved. The new structure dedicated in April 1953.)	Knox & Elliott	Richardsonian Romanesque	During the pastorate of the Rev. D. Ormonde B. Walker (1926 to 1937), founded the St. James Literary Forum in 1927; The Rev. Donald G. Jacobs (1955 to 1968) made the church a center of civil rights activism; Jacobs co-chaired the Emergency Committee of Clergy for Civil Rights, created in April 1964; became only the third Black cleric in the U.S. to lead a major metropolitan area council of Christian churches Cleveland Historic Landmark
St. John African Methodist Episcopal Church	2261 E. 40th St.	1836		1908	Badgley & Nicklas	English Gothic	The first African American congregation in Cleveland; established by six fugitive slaves; a long history of civil rights activism; "Station Hope" on the Underground Railroad; under pastorate of the Rev. Reverdy C. Ransom (1893 to 1896), implemented an extensive program of social outreach, including education classes, kindergarten, sports, and health; hosted Booker T. Washington in 1897; hosted W. E. B. Du Bois in 1908; 1908 building was the then-largest ever built by Blacks in the city of Cleveland; hosted singer Marian Anderson in her first Cleveland concert in 1925; one of only two Black congregations to support the Congress of Racial Equality when it began work in Cleveland in 1946; Cleveland Historic Landmark; building on the National Register of Historic Places, 1982
St. Philip's Christian Church	2303 E. 30th St.	1953		1967—1968	Frederick S. Toguchi	Brutalist	Cleveland Historic Landmark
Shiloh Baptist Church	5500 Scovill Ave.	1850		1905—1906 (Note: The structure was built by the Jewish congregation of B'Nai Jeshurun and completed in September 1906. Shiloh Baptist Church purchased the structure in May 1923, but could not take possession until the new synagogue was completed. The new synagogue opened on August 27, 1926.)	Harry A. Cone	Neoclassical	The first African American Baptist congregation in Cleveland; congregation was active in the civil rights movement; hosted the Rev. Martin Luther King Jr. in September 1967; Cleveland Historic Landmark; building listed on the National Register of Historic Places

== Bibliography ==
- Armstrong, Foster; Klein, Richard; Armstrong, Cara (1992). A Guide to Cleveland's Sacred Landmarks. Kent, Ohio: Kent State University Press. ISBN 9780873384544.
- Barnes, Sandra L. (2010). Black Megachurch Culture: Models for Education and Empowerment. New York: Peter Lang. ISBN 9781433109089.
- Ellis, Lloyd H. (2012). A Guide to Greater Cleveland's Sacred Landmarks. Kent, Ohio: The Kent State University Press. ISBN 9781606351215.
- Gregor, Sharon E. (2010). Rockefeller's Cleveland. Charleston, S.C.: Arcadia Publishing. ISBN 9780738577111.
- Harper, Frederick Nile (2005). Urban Churches, Vital Signs: Beyond Charity Toward Justice. Eugene, Ore.: Wipf & Stock Publishers. ISBN 9781597521239.
- Johannesen, Eric (1979). Cleveland Architecture, 1876-1976. Cleveland: Western Reserve Historical Society. ISBN 9780911704211.
- Johnson, Crisfield (1879). History of Cuyahoga County, Ohio: With Portraits and Biographical Sketches of Its Prominent Men and Pioneers. Philadelphia: D.W. Ensign.
- LaRoche, Cheryl Janifer (2025). Apostle of Liberation: AME Bishop Paul Quinn and the Underground Railroad. Lanham, Md.: Rowman & Littlefield. ISBN 9781538198117.
- Phillips, Kimberly (1999). AlabamaNorth: African-American Migrants, Community, and Working-Class Activism in Cleveland, 1915-45. Urbana, Ill.: University of Illinois Press. ISBN 9780252024771.
- Valleriano, Anthony J. (2012). Dedication: The Work of William P. Ginther, Ecclesiastical Architect. Kent, Ohio: Kent State University Press. ISBN 9781606351031.
