= William H. Nicklas =

- Born: 1866; New Philadelphia, Ohio
- Died: 1960 (aged 93–94)
- Occupation: Architect

William H. Nicklas (1866–1960) was an Ohio architect who was best known for his church designs in partnership with Sidney Badgley.

Nicklas was born in New Philadelphia, Ohio and graduated from Ohio Northern University. He first began his career in education and was working as an architect by 1894 in New Philadelphia. He moved to Cleveland, Ohio in 1897 and worked in Sidney Rose Badgley's office as a draftsman. Nicklas became a partner in 1904 in the firm which became known as Badgley and Nicklas until it was dissolved in 1913. Nicklas continued the firm for several years after the death of Badgley in 1917.

The largest portion of the firm's work was in the Cleveland area but also designed buildings throughout the Midwestern United States. Many of these buildings are today listed on the National Register of Historic Places.

Incomplete list of extant Nicklas designs:

== Selected works ==
Building	Year Completed	Builder	Style	Source	Location	Image
Deering Memorial United Methodist Church, gift of William Deering	1910–1911	Sidney Badgley & William H. Nicklas	Gothic Revival		South Paris, Maine	
Reid Memorial Presbyterian Church,	1904–06	Sidney Badgley & William H. Nicklas	Gothic Revival		Richmond, Indiana	
Calvary Baptist Church	1907	Sidney Badgley & William H. Nicklas	Gothic Revival		Providence, Rhode Island	
Highland Park Presbyterian Church (Michigan)	1910–11	Sidney Badgley & William H. Nicklas	Gothic Revival		Detroit, Michigan	
Woodward Avenue Presbyterian Church	1911	Sidney Badgley & William H. Nicklas	Gothic Revival		Detroit, Michigan	

- Lakewood United Methodist Church, Cleveland, Ohio, 1904
- Cleveland Heights Presbyterian Church, Cleveland, Ohio, 1904
- Central Methodist (United) Church, Calgary, Alberta, 1905
- St. John AME Church, Cleveland, Ohio, 1908
- Grace Methodist Church, Zanesville, Ohio, 1909
- Fourth Reformed Church, Cleveland, Ohio, 1909
- Trinity United Methodist Church, Athens, Tennessee 1910
- Fidelity Baptist Church, Cleveland, OH, 1911
- First Presbyterian Church, Wichita, Kansas, 1912
- Lakewood Congregational Church, Lakewood, Ohio, 1913
- Broadway Methodist Church, Cleveland, Ohio, 1918–19
- Third Christian Church, Norfolk, Virginia, 1922
- Trinity Episcopal Church, New Philadelphia, Ohio
- Trinity United Methodist Church, Sandusky, Ohio, 1923
