= Paris, Maine =

Town in Maine, United States

- Town
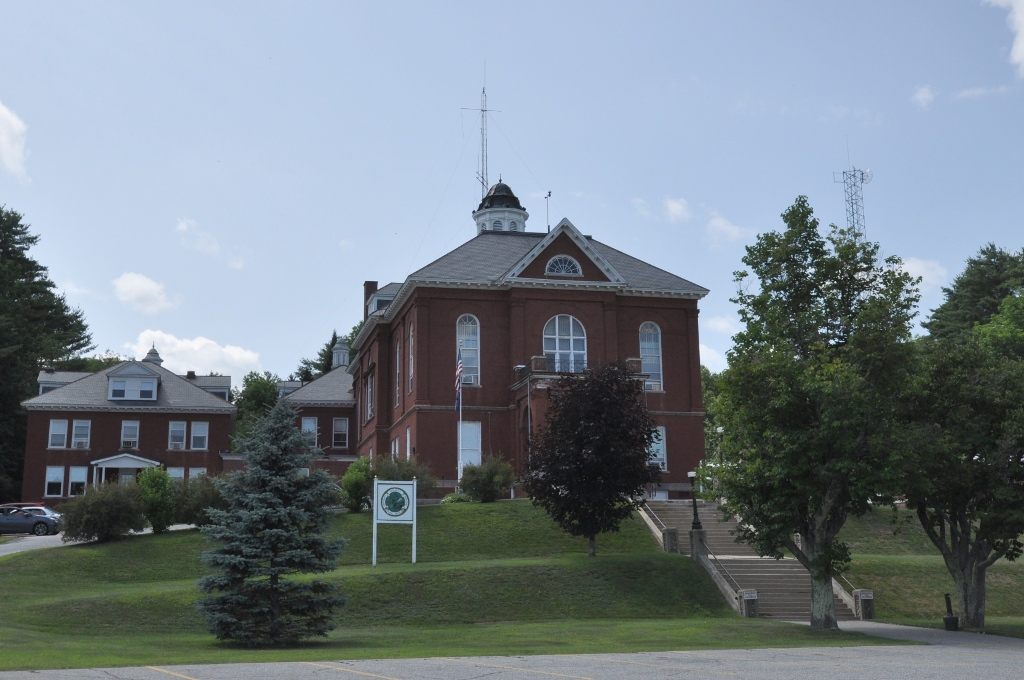
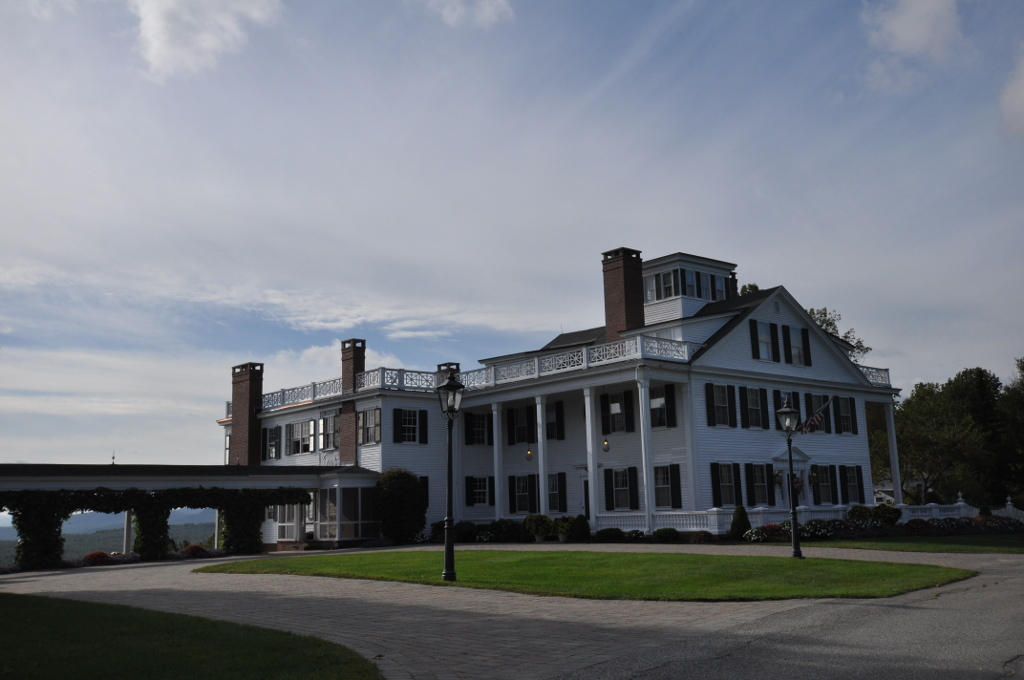
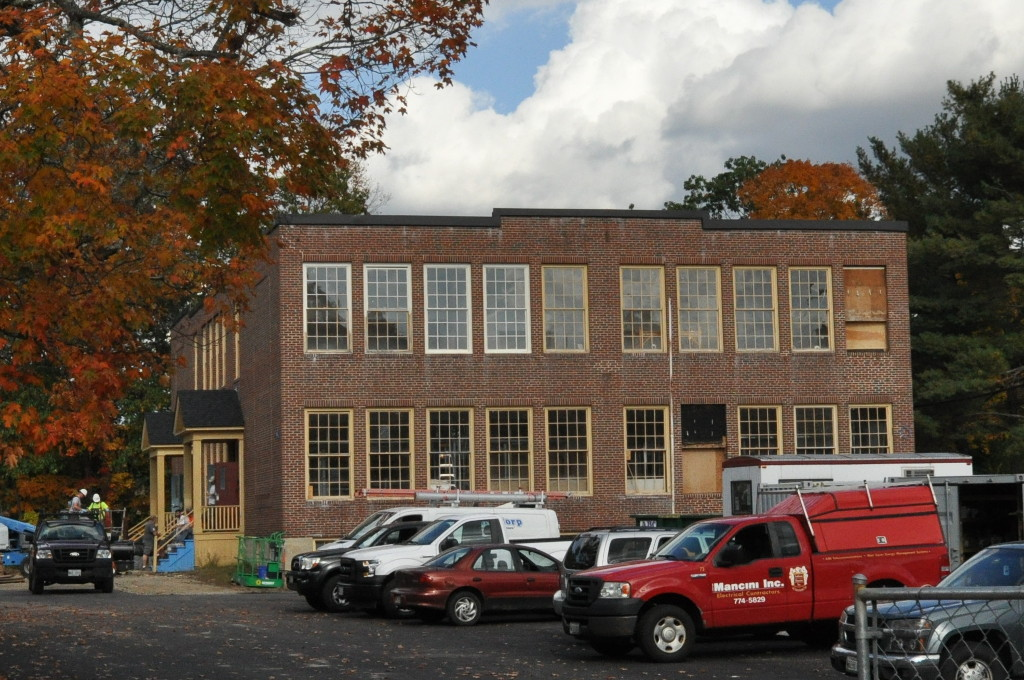
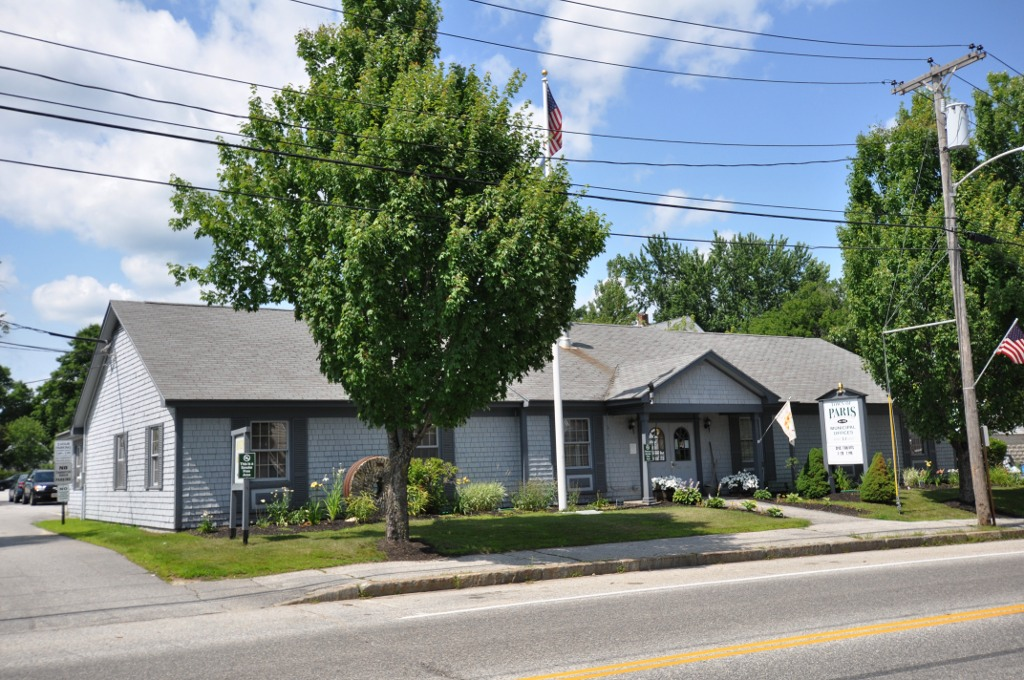
- From top, left to right: Oxford County Courthouse; Hamlin House; Old brick school; Town offices

- Seal
- Etymology: A name of which is believed to be borrowed from Paris, France
- Location within Maine Location within the United States
- Coordinates: 44°14′47″N 70°30′18″W
- Country: United States
- State: Maine
- County: Oxford
- Incorporated: June 20, 1793

Area
  - Total: 40.97 sq mi (106.11 km^{2})
  - Land: 40.77 sq mi (105.59 km^{2})
  - Water: 0.20 sq mi (0.52 km^{2})
- Elevation: 568 ft (173 m)

Population (2020)
  - Total: 5,179
  - Density: 130/sq mi (49/km^{2})
- Demonym: Parisian
- Time zone: UTC-5 (Eastern (EST))
  - Summer (DST): UTC-4 (EDT)
- ZIP Codes: 04271 (Paris); 04281 (South Paris)
- Area code: 207
- FIPS code: 23-56625
- GNIS feature ID: 582661
- Website: parismaine.org

Paris is a town in and the county seat of Oxford County, Maine, United States. Paris is included in the Lewiston-Auburn, Maine metropolitan New England City and Town Area. The population was 5,179 at the 2020 census. The census-designated place of South Paris is located within the town. Because the U.S. Post Office refers to the entire town as South Paris, the town as a whole is commonly referred to as South Paris. The main exception is the area known as Paris Hill, which is a scenic historic district popular with tourists. On May 30, 2019, the town declared itself to be a second amendment sanctuary.

== History ==
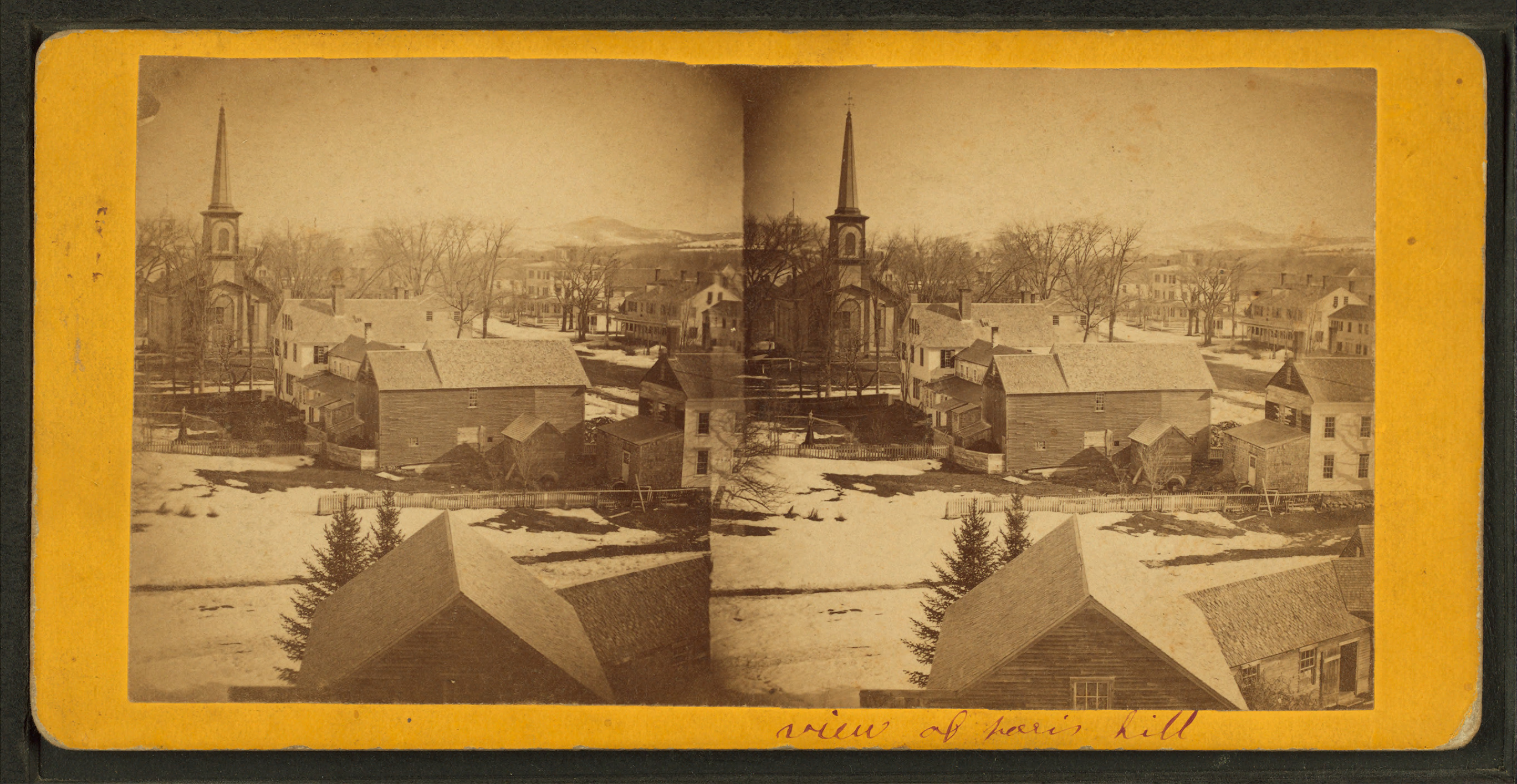
View of Paris Hill, a Victorian era stereographic card

It was granted by Massachusetts on June 11, 1771, to Captain Joshua Fuller of Watertown, Massachusetts and 59 others (or their heirs) for service during the French and Indian Wars. It was the second attempt to repay the soldiers, because their first grant in New Hampshire, made on November 24, 1736, and called Township Number Four, was deemed invalid because of a prior claim by the heirs of John Mason. The land in Maine would retain the name Township Number Four.

On November 4, 1773, when the Proprietors were lotting out the township, they held a meeting at Coolidge Tavern in Watertown Massachusetts and they voted that there be reserved for the use of the proprietors their heirs and assigns forever two rods in width on the eastward side of every range line through the length of the township for the conveniency of ways if it shall be needed, establishing rangeways to prevent landlocking and segregation in the township of Paris and West Paris.

It was first settled near the center of the town in 1779 by Lemuel Jackson, John Willis and their families. Organized as Number Four Plantation, it was incorporated as Paris on June 20, 1793. At the establishment of Oxford County in 1805, Paris was designated its county seat and developed into a thriving community. It was noted for scenic beauty and excellent pasturage, including some of the state's best livestock and dairy farms. It also had many large apple orchards. The village of Paris Hill was established at an elevation of 820 feet (250 m) above sea level, with views of Mount Chocorua and Mount Washington in the White Mountains. The Paris Hill Historic District, added to the National Register of Historic Places in 1973, has fine examples of Federal and Greek Revival architecture. The old Oxford County Jail, built of granite in 1822, was given in 1902 to the Paris Hill Library Association, and is now the Hamlin Memorial Library and Museum.

The Little Androscoggin River provided water power for mills at South Paris, to which the town center shifted after the arrival of the Atlantic and St. Lawrence Railroad on June 8, 1850. Industries included a gristmill, sawmill, shingle mill, planing mill, iron foundry and machine shop. In the 1890s, the county seat moved here from Paris Hill to be near the train station. Manufacturing would fade with the Great Depression, but South Paris remains the commercial part of the town. West Paris, which includes North Paris, was set off and incorporated in 1957.

The town's name is believed to be borrowed from the city in France.

== Geography ==
According to the United States Census Bureau, the town has a total area of 40.97 square miles (106.11 km^{2}), of which 40.77 square miles (105.59 km^{2}) is land and 0.20 square miles (0.52 km^{2}) is water. Paris is drained by the Little Androscoggin River. The town is located on a bed of pegmatite in which many semi-precious gems and rare stones can be found, including beryl, garnet, tourmaline, amethyst and smoky quartz.

Paris is crossed by state routes 26, 117, 118 and 119.

== Demographics ==
Historical population
Census	Pop.	Note	%±
1800	844		—
1810	1,320		56.4%
1820	1,844		39.7%
1830	2,306		25.1%
1840	2,454		6.4%
1850	2,882		17.4%
1860	2,827		−1.9%
1870	2,765		−2.2%
1880	2,931		6.0%
1890	3,156		7.7%
1900	3,225		2.2%
1910	3,436		6.5%
1920	3,656		6.4%
1930	3,761		2.9%
1940	4,094		8.9%
1950	4,358		6.4%
1960	3,601		−17.4%
1970	3,739		3.8%
1980	4,168		11.5%
1990	4,492		7.8%
2000	4,793		6.7%
2010	5,183		8.1%
2020	5,179		−0.1%
U.S. Decennial Census

=== 2010 census ===
As of the census of 2010, there were 5,183 people, 2,187 households, and 1,332 families living in the town. The population density was 127.1 inhabitants per square mile (49.1/km^{2}). There were 2,419 housing units at an average density of 59.3 per square mile (22.9/km^{2}). The racial makeup of the town was 95.9% White, 0.5% African American, 0.5% Native American, 0.8% Asian, 0.4% from other races, and 2.0% from two or more races. Hispanic or Latino of any race were 1.3% of the population.

There were 2,187 households, of which 28.6% had children under the age of 18 living with them, 43.3% were married couples living together, 11.5% had a female householder with no husband present, 6.1% had a male householder with no wife present, and 39.1% were non-families. 30.5% of all households were made up of individuals, and 14.2% had someone living alone who was 65 years of age or older. The average household size was 2.28 and the average family size was 2.80.

The median age in the town was 44.3 years. 20.8% of residents were under the age of 18; 7.1% were between the ages of 18 and 24; 23% were from 25 to 44; 29.2% were from 45 to 64; and 19.9% were 65 years of age or older. The gender makeup of the town was 48.6% male and 51.4% female.

=== 2000 census ===
As of the census of 2000, there were 4,793 people, 1,975 households, and 1,238 families living in the town. The population density was 117.6 inhabitants per square mile (45.4/km^{2}). There were 2,142 housing units at an average density of 52.5 per square mile (20.3/km^{2}). The racial makeup of the town was 97.89% White, 0.31% African American, 0.15% Native American, 0.92% Asian, 0.02% Pacific Islander, 0.19% from other races, and 0.52% from two or more races. Hispanic or Latino of any race were 0.35% of the population. 31.2% were of English, 15.0% American, 9.9% French, 9.7% Irish and 7.1% Finnish ancestry according to Census 2000.

There were 1,975 households, out of which 27.7% had children under the age of 18 living with them, 48.8% were married couples living together, 9.9% had a female householder with no husband present, and 37.3% were non-families. 30.3% of all households were made up of individuals, and 14.7% had someone living alone who was 65 years of age or older. The average household size was 2.31 and the average family size was 2.85.

In the town, the population was spread out, with 21.7% under the age of 18, 7.9% from 18 to 24, 27.5% from 25 to 44, 23.0% from 45 to 64, and 19.9% who were 65 years of age or older. The median age was 40 years. For every 100 females, there were 91.3 males. For every 100 females age 18 and over, there were 89.4 males.

The median income for a household in the town was $33,625, and the median income for a family was $43,166. Males had a median income of $28,235 versus $20,764 for females. The per capita income for the town was $16,441. About 4.9% of families and 10.2% of the population were below the poverty line, including 10.7% of those under age 18 and 10.8% of those age 65 or over.

== Sites of interest and National Historic Places ==
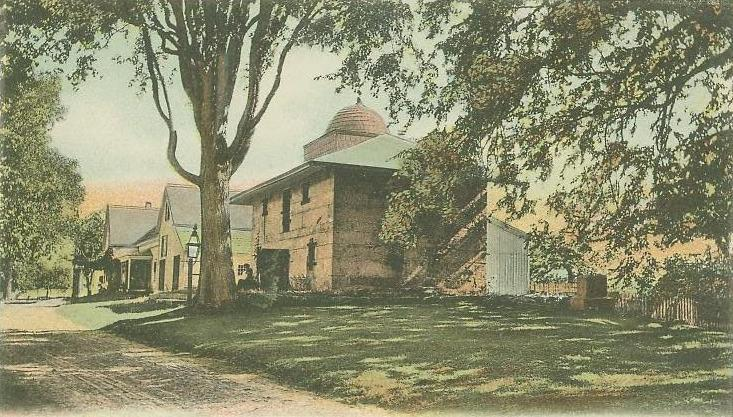
Old Jail at Paris Hill, now the Hamlin Memorial Library and Museum

- Celebration Barn Theater
- Hamlin Memorial Library & Museum
- Paris Cape Historical Society
- Deering Memorial United Methodist Church

== Notable people ==
- Charles Andrews, U.S. congressman
- John Andrews, Maine state representative
- Timothy J. Carter, U.S. congressman
- Mary S. Caswell, educator and writer
- Charles Deering, businessman, philanthropist
- James Deering, industrialist, builder of Villa Vizcaya
- William Deering, businessman, philanthropist
- Rufus K. Goodenow, U.S. congressman
- Hannibal Hamlin, U.S. congressman, senator, 26th governor of Maine, 15th U.S. vice president
- Levi Hubbard, U.S. congressman
- William Wirt Kimball, admiral
- Horatio King, U.S. postmaster general
- Enoch Lincoln, U.S. congressman, 6th governor of Maine
- Tony Montanaro, mime, director, instructor
- Harvey D. Parker, hotelier
- Albion K. Parris, U.S. senator, 5th governor
- Virgil D. Parris, U.S. congressman
- Joe Perham, storyteller, public speaker, humorist
- Z. B. Rawson, member of the Washington House of Representatives
- Reta Shaw, actress from South Paris
- Alfred A. Starbird, US Army brigadier general
- Daniel Bartlett Stevens, Wisconsin assemblyman
