= St. John African Methodist Episcopal Church (Cleveland) =

Historic church in Ohio, United States

- St. John's AME Church
- U.S. National Register of Historic Places
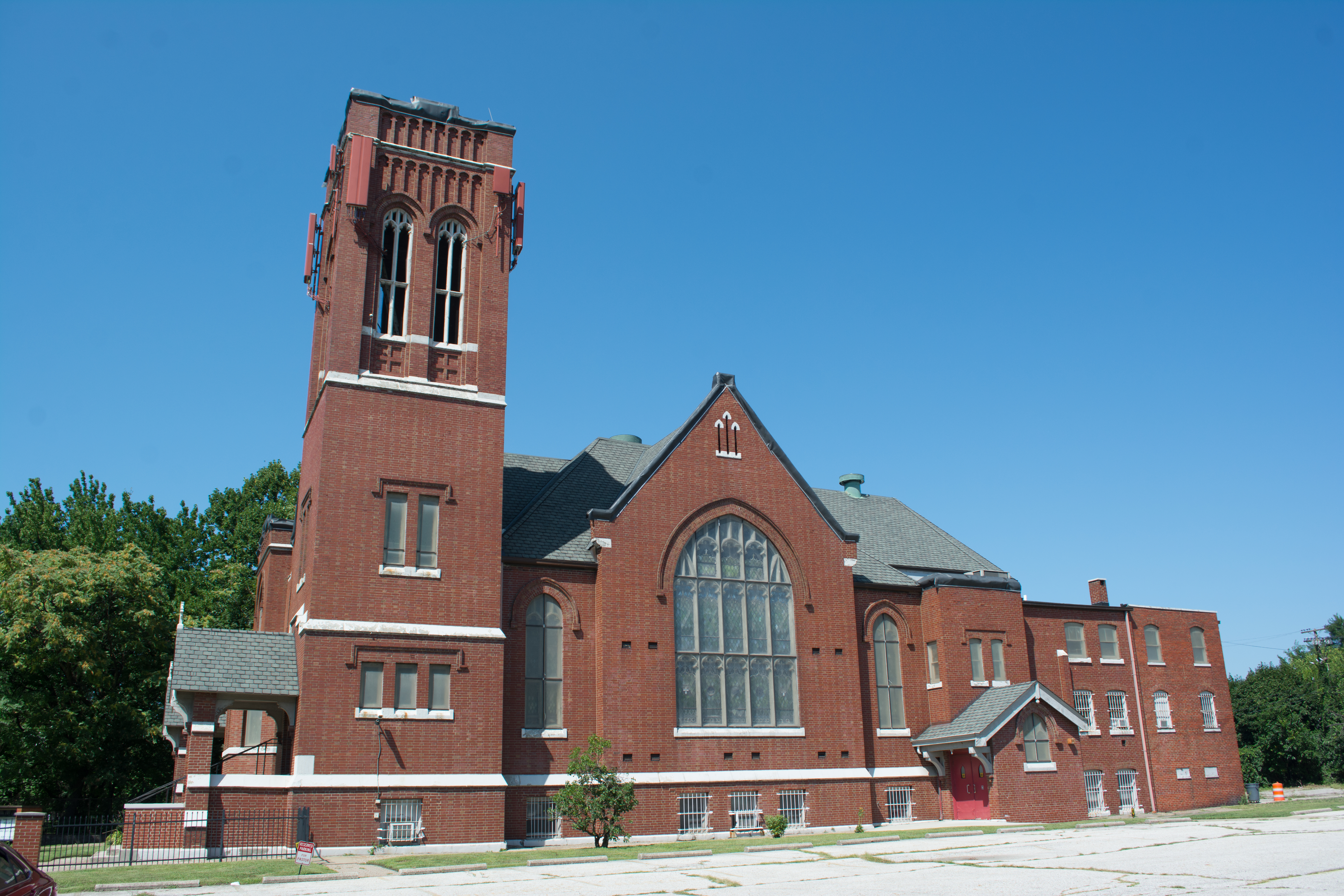

- Location within Cleveland Location within Ohio Location within the United States
- Location: 2261 E. 40th St., Cleveland, Ohio
- Coordinates: 41°29′48″N 81°39′22″W
- Area: less than one acre
- Built: 1908
- Architect: Badgley & Nicklas; Aring, John F.
- Architectural style: Gothic, Gothic eclectic
- MPS: Black History TR
- NRHP reference No.: 82001370
- Added to NRHP: December 17, 1982

St. John's African Methodist Episcopal Church is a historic church at 2261 East 40th Street in Cleveland, Ohio.

Founded in 1836 by six fugitive slaves, St. John's AME Church was first African American Christian congregation ever formed in Cleveland. The congregation has a long history of civil rights activism. Its original church building was known as "Station Hope" on the Underground Railroad. Under the pastorate of Rev. Reverdy C. Ransom (1893 to 1896), it implemented an extensive program of social outreach, including education classes, kindergarten, sports, and health. The congregation hosted Booker T. Washington in 1897 and W. E. B. Du Bois in 1908.

The congregation began construction on a permanent church home in February 1908. The English Gothic style building was designed by the local architectural firm of Badgley & Nicklas. Construction ws completed in mid December 1908. At the time, it was the largest church ever constructed by a Black congregation in the city of Cleveland.

It was added to the National Register in 1982. It is considered a historic Black church in Cleveland, and is a city-designated Cleveland Historic Landmark.
