= Deering Memorial United Methodist Church =

Historic church in Maine, United States

- U.S. National Register of Historic Places
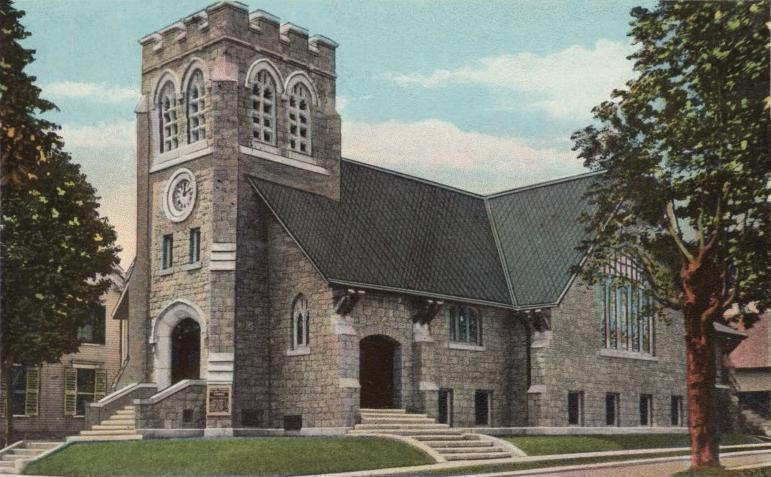

- Location within Maine Location within the United States
- Location: 39 Main St., Paris, Maine
- Coordinates: 44°13′23″N 70°30′55″W
- Area: 0.2 acres (0.081 ha)
- Built: 1911
- Architect: Sidney Badgley and William H. Nicklas; Littlefield, E.A. (contractor)
- Architectural style: Late Gothic Revival
- NRHP reference No.: 07001444
- Added to NRHP: January 24, 2008

Deering Memorial United Methodist Church is a historic church at 39 Main Street in South Paris, Maine. Completed in 1911 for a congregation established in 1815, it is the only known work in Maine of the Cleveland, Ohio partnership of Badgley and Nicklas, and one of Oxford County's finest late Gothic Revival churches. The building was listed on the National Register of Historic Places in 2008. Deering Memorial was closed November 18, 2016 as an active house of worship.

== Description and history ==
The Deering Church occupies a prominent lot on the north side of Main Street in South Paris, Maine, the main village of the town of Paris, the county seat of Oxford County. It is a single story cruciform structure with a projecting tower, built of coursed granite ashlar stone, with contrasting cast stone trim elements, and resting on a slightly raised foundation. The cruciform shape is limited in its width by the small lot: the transepts extend only 6 feet (1.8 m) to either side of the nave, in a building whose total length is 87 feet (27 m). Buttresses reinforce the corners of the building and the tower, and also line the long sides of the nave. The tower has a crenellated parapet at the top, and houses a clock and bell which were also used in the building this one replaced.

The church building is the third (all located on the same site) to be used by the Methodist congregation which was established in 1815 under the tutelage of Rev. John Adams of Poland. After deciding in 1909 that a new building was needed, William Deering, son of a local judge, contributed $16,000 to its construction, with the rest of the construction cost raised by subscription. The church was named in memory of Deering's parents.

It is unclear how the Cleveland firm of Badgley and Nicklas was selected to design the building. The building's interior decorations were executed by Harry Hayman Cochrane, a noted regional muralist whose distinctive work also appears in Cumston Hall, Monmouth, Maine.

== See also ==
- National Register of Historic Places listings in Oxford County, Maine
