= Z. B. Rawson =

American politician and lawyer (1858–1928)

Member of the Washington House of Representatives from the 41st district
- In office 1901–1903

Personal details
- Born: June 5, 1858 Paris, Maine, U.S.
- Died: June 29, 1928 (aged 70) Seattle, Washington, U.S.
- Party: Republican

Zephaniah B. Rawson (June 5, 1858 – June 29, 1928) was an American politician and lawyer in the state of Washington. He served in the Washington House of Representatives.
