= Calvary Presbyterian Church (Cleveland) =

Historic church in Ohio, United States

- U.S. National Register of Historic Places
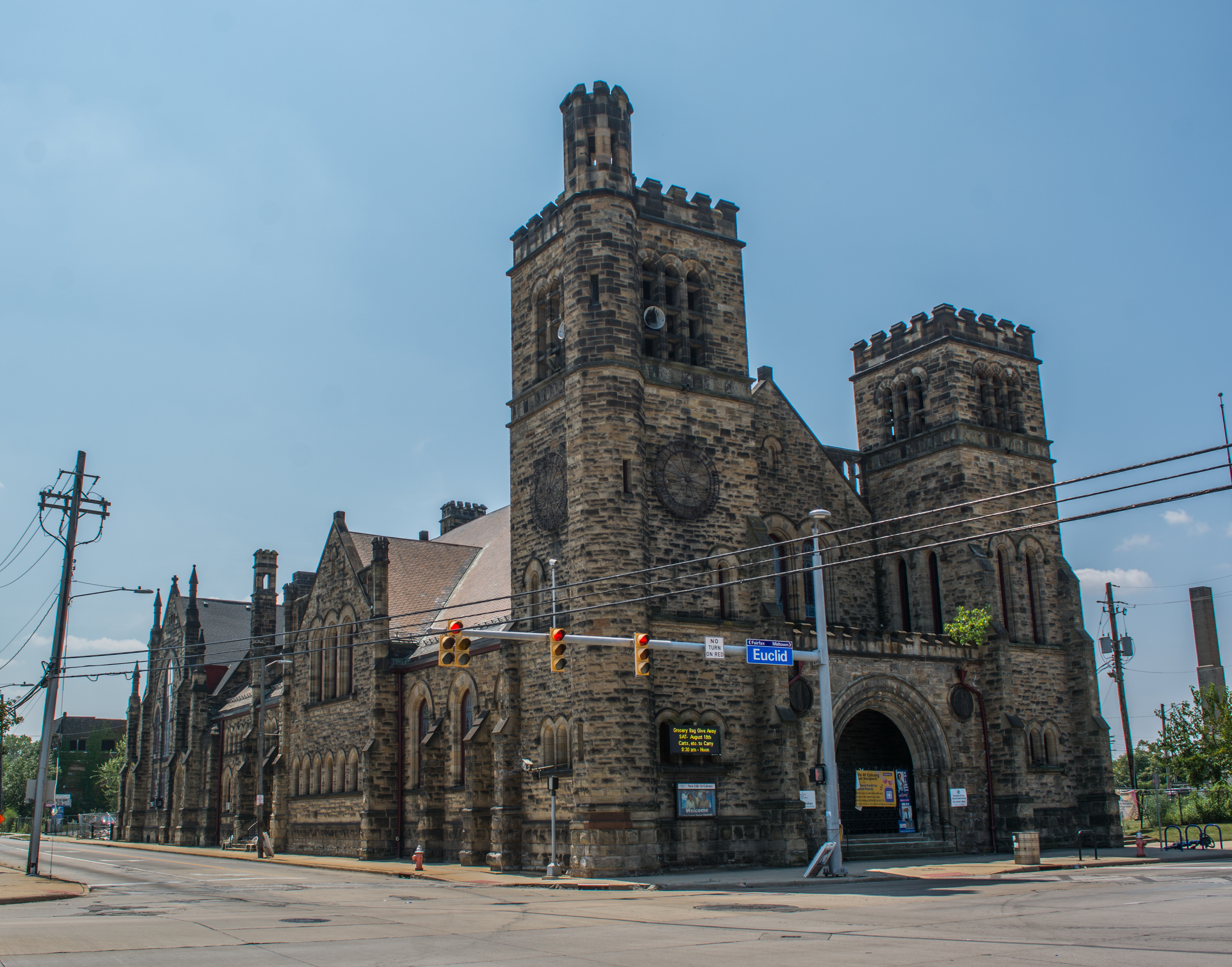

- Location within Cleveland Location within Ohio Location within the United States
- Location: 7812 Euclid Ave., Cleveland, Ohio
- Coordinates: 41°30′13″N 81°38′02″W
- Built: 1890
- Architect: Charles F. Schweinfurth
- Architectural style: GVictorian Romanesque Revival
- NRHP reference No.: 100011407
- Added to NRHP: February 3, 2025

Calvary Presbyterian Church is a historic church located at 7812 Euclid Avenue in Cleveland, Ohio.

The Presbyterian congregation was formed in 1880 as Calvary Chapel, a missionary offshoot of the Old Stone Church. The group began construction on a permanent building in August 1888. It was designed by famous local architect Charles F. Schweinfurth in the Victorian Romanesque Revival style. Work was completed and the church dedicated in early January 1890. The congregation became independent of the Old Stone Church in May 1892.

The congregation was at first overwhelmingly white. A large influx of African Americans to Cleveland convinced the congregation to formally took a stand against racial segregation in 1953. Calvary Presbyterian became one of the first racially integrated congregations in Cleveland by reaching out to local Black residents.

During the first decade of the new millennium, both Calvary Presbyterian and New Life Presbyterian Church in the Glenville neighborhood saw declining membership. The two congregations merged in June 2013, taking the name New Life at Calvary.

In August 2023, a high-end EF1 tornado struck the Cleveland metropolitan area. The tornado struck New Life at Calvary, tearing the roof off the portion of the Fellowship Hall, which housed the church offices and classrooms. The roof over the sanctuary was also heavily damaged. Contractors said the Fellowship Hall had to have a completely new roof, and a new tongue and groove interior ceiling. Electrical and HVAC systems in the Fellowship Hall and sanctuary had to be replaced, the slate roofing over the sanctuary needed some replacing, and the spires and some stonework on the facade needed some restoration. The cost of many of the needed materials were higher than usual because of the historic nature of the building. There was also extensive water damage and asbestos and lead contamination throughout the structure. Total repair costs were estimated at $6 million to $6.5 million.

New Life at Calvary's sanctuary was restored for use in March 2025.

The building was added to the National Register in 1982. It is considered a historic Black church in Cleveland, and is a city-designated Cleveland Historic Landmark.
