= Sidney Badgley =

Canadian-American architect

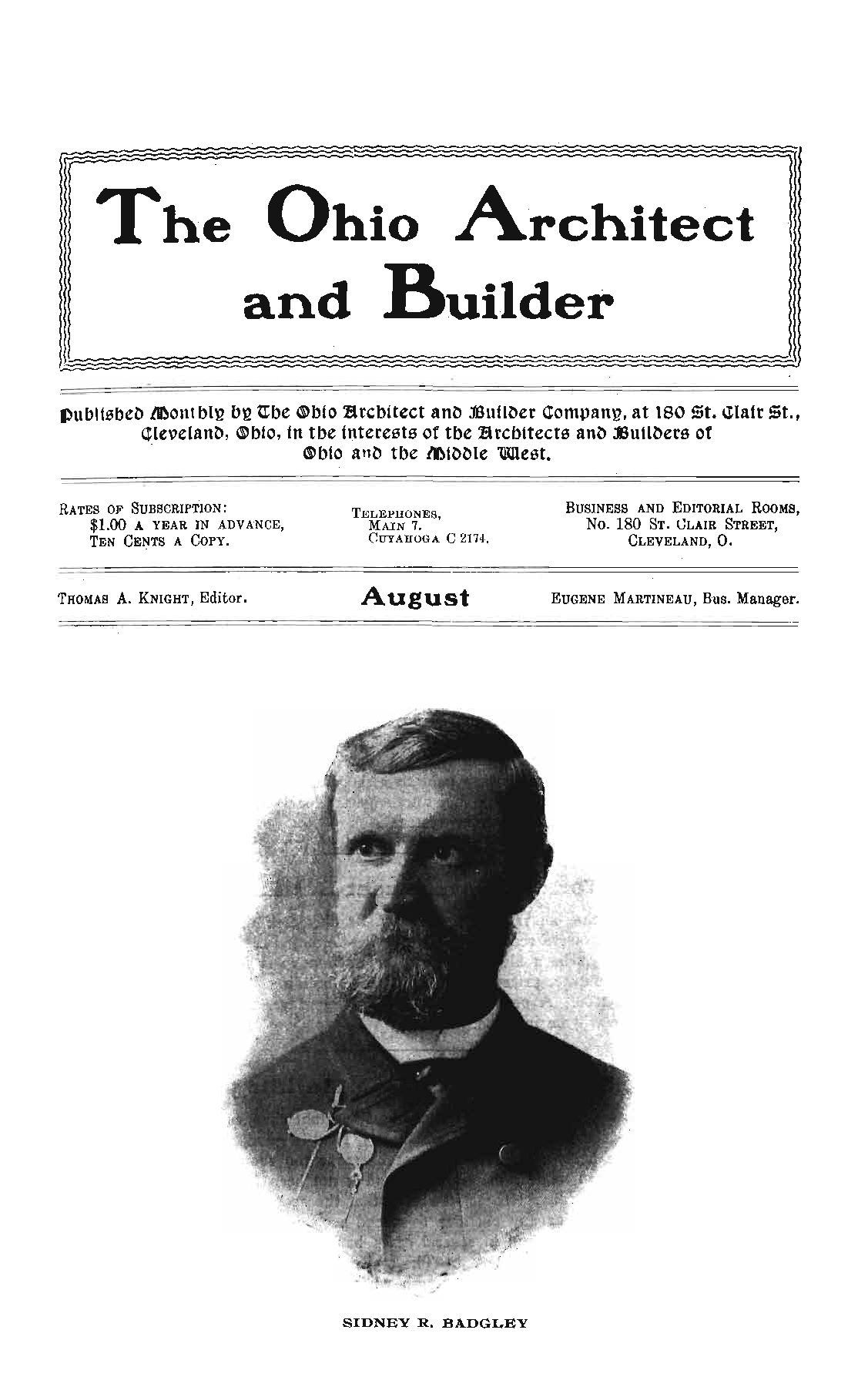
- Badgley on the cover of The Ohio Architect and Builder, 1903
- Born: May 28, 1850; Ernestown Township, Ontario, Canada,
- Died: April 29, 1917 (aged 66)
- Occupation: Architect

Sidney Rose Badgley (May 28, 1850 – April 29, 1917) was a prominent start-of-the-20th-century Canadian-born architect. He was active throughout the United States and Canada, with a significant body of work in Cleveland.

== Biography ==
Badgley was born in Ernestown Township, Ontario, Canada, and apprenticed in Toronto. He moved to Cleveland in 1887 and formed a partnership with William H. Nicklas in 1904 after Nicklas came to work for Badgley as a draftsman. The partnership was dissolved in 1913. He designed buildings in a variety of styles, including Georgian Revival (Jones Home For Friendless Children), Gothic Revival (Calvary Baptist Church), with its lantern-dome-crowned auditorium, and Romanesque Revival (Pilgrim Congregational Church). With Pilgrim Congregational Church, Badgley pioneered the inclusion of an institute for community use within a church building. Badgley's design was exhibited at the Paris 1900 Exposition. Slocum Hall, on the campus of Ohio Wesleyan University has been added to the National Register of Historic Places. Badgley died at his home at Springbrook Farm in Willoughby in 1917 and is buried at Victoria Cemetery in St. Catharines, Ontario.

== Selected works ==
Building	Year Completed	Builder	Style	Source	Location	Image
Massey Hall	1894	Sidney Badgley	Gothic Revival	W	178 Victoria Street, Toronto, Ontario	
Slocum Hall	1898	Sidney Badgley	Gothic Revival		Ohio Wesleyan University, Delaware, Ohio	
Lamson House	1899	Sidney Badgley	Gothic Revival		Center Rd (Formerly North St), Bedford, Ohio	
Deering Memorial United Methodist Church, gift of William Deering	1910–1911	Sidney Badgley & William H. Nicklas	Gothic Revival		South Paris, Maine	
Reid Memorial Presbyterian Church,	1904–06	Sidney Badgley & William H. Nicklas	Gothic Revival		Richmond, Indiana	
Calvary Baptist Church	1907	Sidney Badgley & William H. Nicklas	Gothic Revival		Providence, Rhode Island	
Highland Park Presbyterian Church (Michigan)	1910–11	Sidney Badgley & William H. Nicklas	Gothic Revival		Detroit, Michigan	
Woodward Avenue Presbyterian Church	1911	Sidney Badgley & William H. Nicklas	Gothic Revival		Detroit, Michigan	

- Welland Avenue Methodist (United) Church, St. Catharines, Ontario, 1877
- St. Catharines Public Library, St. Catharines, Ontario, n.d.
- St. Andrew's Presbyterian Church, Carleton Place, Ontario, 1887
- Henry Hammersley House, 1849 East 89th Street, Cleveland, OH, 1888
- St. Paul's Methodist Episcopal Church, 473 Cumberland Street, Ottawa, 1888
- First Methodist Church, 123 West Church, Barnesville, 1888
- Frank Kitzsteiner Residence, 2075 Fairview Avenue, Cleveland, OH, 1889
- Residence for James Kyser, 2179 East 83rd Street, Cleveland, OH, 1889
- Residence for James Kyser, 2175 East 83rd Street, Cleveland, OH, 1889
- Bolton Street Presbyterian Chapel, 2114 East 89th Street, Cleveland, OH, 1890
- Euclid Avenue Church of God, Cleveland, Ohio, 1890
- Grace M. E. Church, 2408 East 83rd Street, Cleveland, OH, 1890
- George Mitchell Residence, 2168 East 79th Street, Cleveland, OH, 1890
- Residence for Will P. Todd, 2201 East 89th Street, Cleveland, OH, 1890
- United Missionary Baptist Church, 9312 Union Avenue, Cleveland, OH, 1891
- Redeemer Missionary Baptist Church (Grace Protestant Episcopal Church), 9028 Harvard Avenue, Cleveland, OH, 1891
- Superior Street Baptist Church, 2445-51 Superior Avenue, Cleveland, OH, 1891
- Free Will Baptist Church, 8402 Wade Park Avenue, Cleveland, OH, 1891
- St. Timothy Missionary Baptist Church, 7101 Carnegie Avenue, Cleveland, OH, 1891
- Hough Avenue Baptist Church, 1650 East 65th Street, Cleveland, OH, 1891
- Centenary Methodist Church, Montreal, Quebec, 1891
- Fidelity Baptist Church, Cleveland, Ohio, 1891
- St. Timothy Missionary Baptist Church (originally First United Presbyterian), Cleveland, Ohio, 1891
- Jennings Avenue Methodist Episcopal Church, 2587 West 14th Street, Cleveland, OH, 1892
- First Presbyterian Church, 22 Church Street, Gouverneur, 1892
- Wade Park Avenue Methodist Episcopal Church, 8520 Wade Park Avenue, Cleveland, OH, 1892
- Lincoln Park Methodist Episcopal Church, Cleveland, OH, 1892
- Mt. Union Methodist Episcopal Church, 1849 South Union, Alliance, OH, 1893
- Pilgrim Congregational Church, 2592 West 14th Street, Cleveland, OH, 1893
- Cedar Avenue Baptist Church, 10302 Cedar Avenue, Cleveland, OH, 1893
- Willson United Methodist Church, 1561 East 55th, Cleveland, OH, 1893
- Baptist Church, 52 Church Street, Gouverneur, NY, 1893
- Scranton Road Baptist Church, Cleveland, Ohio, 1893
- First Presbyterian Church, 300 Market Street, Warren, OH, 1894
- Trinity Methodist Church, 9900 Madison Avenue, Cleveland, OH, 1894
- Medina County Infirmary, 6144 Wedgewood Road, Medina, OH, 1894
- First Methodist Episcopal Church, 60 West Main Street, Norwalk, OH, 1894
- Glenwood Methodist Episcopal Church, Buffalo, NY, 1894
- Pilgrim Congregational Church, Cleveland, Ohio, 1894
- John Grant Residence, 2203 Cornell Road, Cleveland, OH, 1895
- First Congregational Church, 431 Columbus Street, Sandusky, OH, 1895
- First Congregational Church, 140 South Main Street, Wellington, OH, 1895
- Herman Foote Residence, 2335 East 79th Street, Cleveland, OH, 1895
- Giovanni Barricelli House, Cleveland, Ohio, 1896
- Factory for Taylor, Strong and Company, 8304 Madison Avenue, Cleveland, OH, 1896
- Mott Avenue Methodist Episcopal Church, New York City, NY, 1896
- Methodist Episcopal Church, Foochow, China, 1896
- Central Methodist (United) Church, St. Thomas, Ontario, 1897
- St. Paul's AME Zion Church, 2393 East 55th Street, Cleveland, OH, 1899
- Niles Methodist Church, 1214 North Mechanic Street, Niles, OH, 1899
- First M.E. Church, 104 West Franklin, Troy, OH, 1899
- First M.E. Church, Austin, IL, 1899
- Ohio Wesleyan Medical School, Cleveland, Ohio, 1900
- Charles Elson Residence, 1762 Crawford Road, Cleveland, OH, 1900
- Residence for F. W. Robinson, 1733 East 60th Street, Cleveland, OH, 1900
- Commercial-Residential Building, Central and Bertram, Cleveland, OH, 1900
- Millburn Memorial M.E. Church, South Bend, IL, 1900
- First Congregational Church, 3232 Pearl Avenue, Lorain, Ohio, 1900
- Gammon United Methodist Church (currently the North American Motherhouse of Fraternite Notre Dame), Chicago, Illinois, 1900 original design by Badgley, rebuilt after fire to Badgley's original design again in 1909
- Kinsman Street Congregational Church, 5719 Kinsman, Cleveland, OH, 1901
- First M. E. Church, 1601 Charleston Avenue, Matoon, 1901
- Two family residence for Harry Morganthaler, 1510-2 East 84th Street, Cleveland, OH, 1901
- St. Pauls Methodist Episcopal Church, 933 West Colfax, South Bend, OH, 1901
- Mark Thomson Residence, 1680 East 85th Street, Cleveland, OH, 1901
- Jones Home for Friendless Children, Cleveland, Ohio, 1902
- St. Paul's Memorial United Methodist Church, South Bend, Indiana, 1903
- Lakewood United Methodist Church, Cleveland, Ohio, 1904
- Cleveland Heights Presbyterian Church, Cleveland, Ohio, 1904
- Central Methodist (United) Church, Calgary, Alberta, 1905
- St. John AME Church, Cleveland, Ohio, 1908
- Grace Methodist Church, Zanesville, Ohio, 1909
- Fourth Reformed Church, Cleveland, Ohio, 1909
- Trinity United Methodist Chursh, Athens, Tennessee 1910
- Fidelity Baptist Church, Cleveland, OH, 1911
- First Presbyterian Church, Wichita, Kansas, 1912
- Dominion Methodist Church, 687 Avenue Roslyn, Westmount, 1914
- First Methodist Episcopal Church, 501 Main Street, Wellsville, Kansas, 1914
- First Presbyterian Church, Howell, Michigan, 1914–1915
- First United Methodist Church, Shenandoah, Iowa

== NRHP-listed U.S. works ==
Works by Badgley that are listed on the U.S. National Register of Historic Places, and likely preserved, include:

- Calvary Baptist Church, 747 Broad St. Providence RI Badgley, Sidney Rose
- Deering Memorial United Methodist Church, 39 Main St. Paris ME Badgley and Nicklas
- Highland Park Presbyterian Church, 14 Cortland St. Highland Park MI Badgley, Sidney Rose
- Jones Home for Children, 3518 W. Twenty-fifth St. Cleveland OH Badgley, Sidney R.
- Pilgrim Congregational Church, 2592 W. 14th St. Cleveland OH Badgley, Sidney R.
- Slocum Hall, OWU Main Campus, Sandusky St. Delaware OH Badgley, S.R.
- St. John's AME Church, 2261 E. 40th St. Cleveland OH Badgley & Nicklas
- Woodward Ave. Presbyterian Church, 8501 Woodward Ave. Detroit MI Badgley, Sidney Rose
- One or more properties in Austin Town Hall Park Historic District Roughly bounded by West Lake St., N. Central Ave., N. Parkside Ave., and West Race Ave. Chicago IL (Badgley, Sidney R.)
- First Presbyterian Church, Howell, Michigan, (part of the Howell Downtown Historic District,) 323 West Grand River Avenue, Howell, MI

== Sources ==
- Tomlan, Mary Raddant and Michael A. Richmond, Indiana: Its Physical and Aesthetic Heritage to 1920, Indianapolis: Indiana Historical Society, 2003
- Loring, Ken and the 150th Anniversary Committee, First Presbyterian Church, Howell, Michigan, Our Heritage, 1838–1988, Howell, Michigan, 323 West Grand River, Howell, Michigan, Self-published by the Church, 1988 First Presbyterian Church
- Cleveland Architects Database: Sidney R. Badgley
- Cleveland Architects Database: Badgley and Nicklas
