= Shiloh Baptist Church (Cleveland) =

Historic church in Ohio, United States

- U.S. National Register of Historic Places
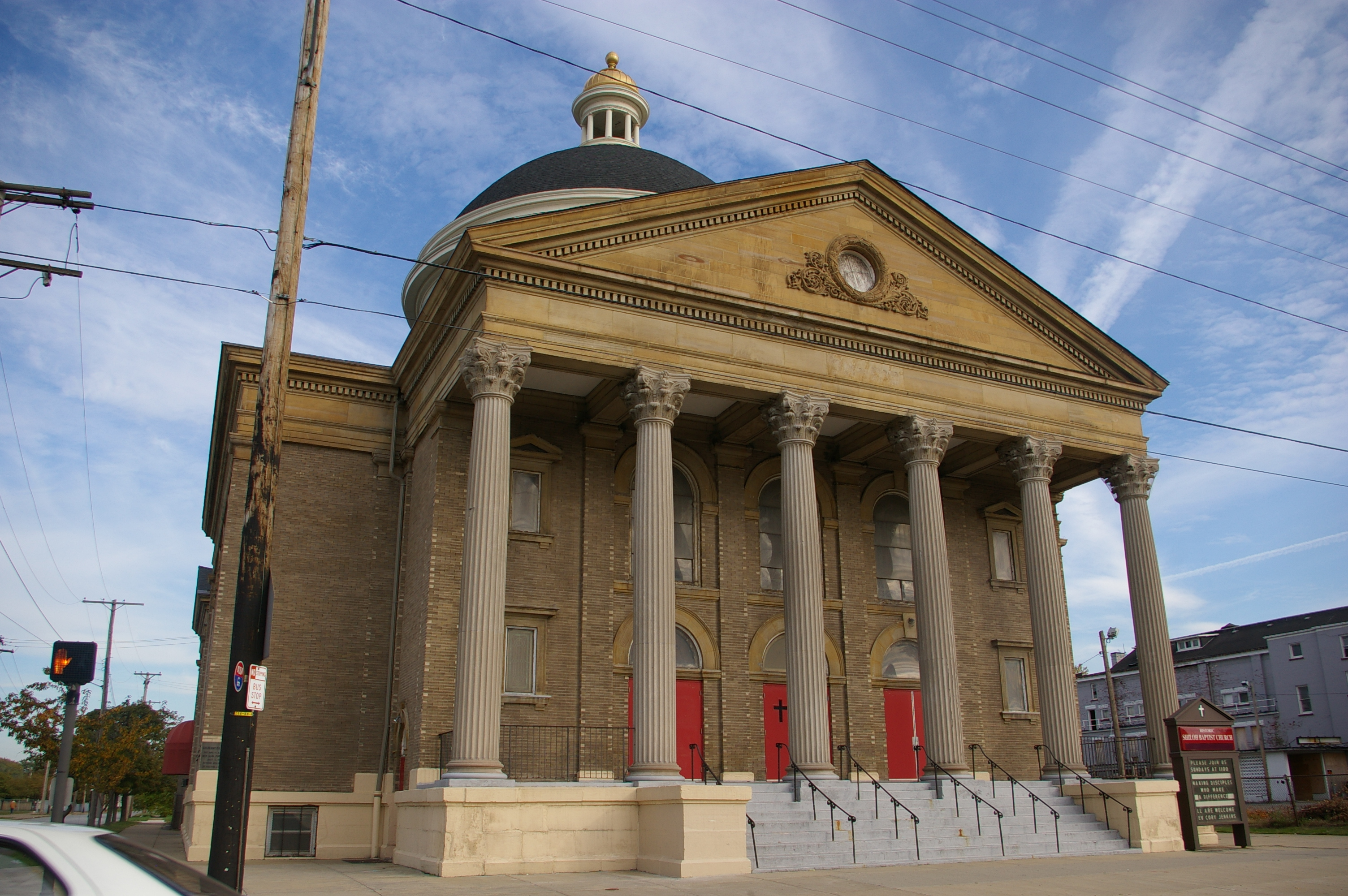

- Location within Cleveland Location within Ohio Location within the United States
- Location: 5500 Scovill Ave., Cleveland, Ohio
- Coordinates: 41°29′29″N 81°39′5″W
- Area: less than one acre
- Built: 1906
- Architect: Cone, Harry
- Architectural style: Classical Revival
- Website: https://www.shilohbaptistchurchcle.org/
- MPS: Black History TR
- NRHP reference No.: 82001371
- Added to NRHP: December 17, 1982

Shiloh Baptist Church is a historic church at 5500 Scovill Avenue in Cleveland, Ohio.

The structure was built by the Jewish congregation of B'Nai Jeshurun. It was designed by local architect Harry A. Cone in the Neoclassical architectural style.

Construction began in late May 1905, and the building dedicated on August 27, 1926.

Shiloh Baptist Church was founded in 1850,1850 and was the first African American Baptist congregation in Cleveland. The congregation purchased the structure in May 1923, but could not take possession until the new synagogue was completed.

The building was added to the National Register of Historic Places in 1982. It is considered a historic Black church in Cleveland. It is also a Cleveland Historic Landmark.
