= Reid Memorial Presbyterian Church =

Historic church in Indiana, United States

Coordinates: 39.8307°N 84.8879°W

- U.S. Historic district – Contributing property
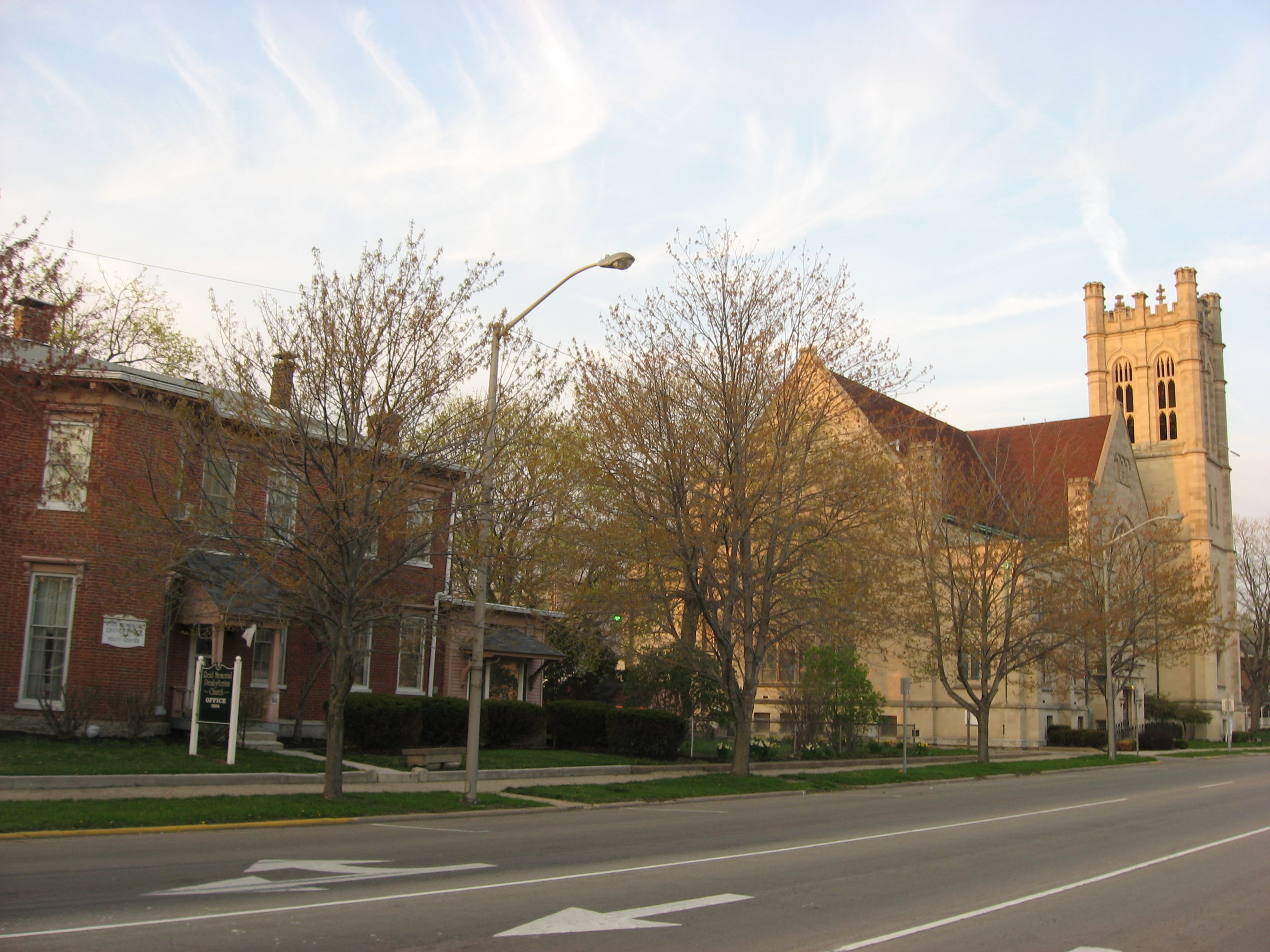
- Memorial Presbyterian Church's manse and church building

- Location within Indiana Location within the United States
- Location: Richmond, Indiana
- Part of: Starr Historic District (ID74000026)
- Added to NRHP: June 28, 1974

Reid Memorial Presbyterian Church is an architecturally significant building located at 11th and North "A" Streets in Richmond, Indiana. Designed by the Cleveland, Ohio architectural partnership of Sidney Badgley and William H. Nicklas the building was begun in 1904 and dedicated on May 13, 1906. The building committee had visited the Badgley and Nicklas-designed St. Paul's Methodist Episcopal Church (now St. Paul's Memorial United Methodist Church) which had been built by the Clement Studebaker family in South Bend, Indiana and the two churches have strikingly similar design elements in the sanctuaries. Reid Church was paid for by Daniel G. Reid in memory of his parents Daniel Reid and Anna Gray Reid. The church interiors and windows were designed by Louis Comfort Tiffany and the Tiffany Studios. The original organ designed by Hook and Hastings is still in use, though it was rebuilt in 1958 by the Wicks Organ Company. The organ was featured with a recital during the Organ Historical Society's 2007 convention in Indianapolis.

Membership having dwindled to a few dozen people, the congregation was dissolved November 5, 2017, and the church closed. The building was listed on the "Ten Most Endangered List" of Indiana Landmarks.

In 2019 a group of volunteers worked with the Whitewater Valley Presbytery, which owns the building, to begin the long process of preservation. The sanctuary is an ideal performance venue and the Steering Committee has arranged an ambitious schedule of performances of various genres, from classical to jazz to bluegrass. It is no longer listed on the "Ten Most Endangered List."

The Reid Memorial Presbyterian Church and Community Center, Inc. (d.b.a. The Reid Center) acquired this property in 2022.

== Sources ==
- Tomlan, Mary Raddant and Michael A. Richmond, Indiana: Its Physical and Aesthetic Heritage to 1920, Indianapolis: Indiana Historical Society, 2003
