= Pilgrim Congregational Church (Cleveland) =

Historic church in Ohio, United States

- U.S. National Register of Historic Places
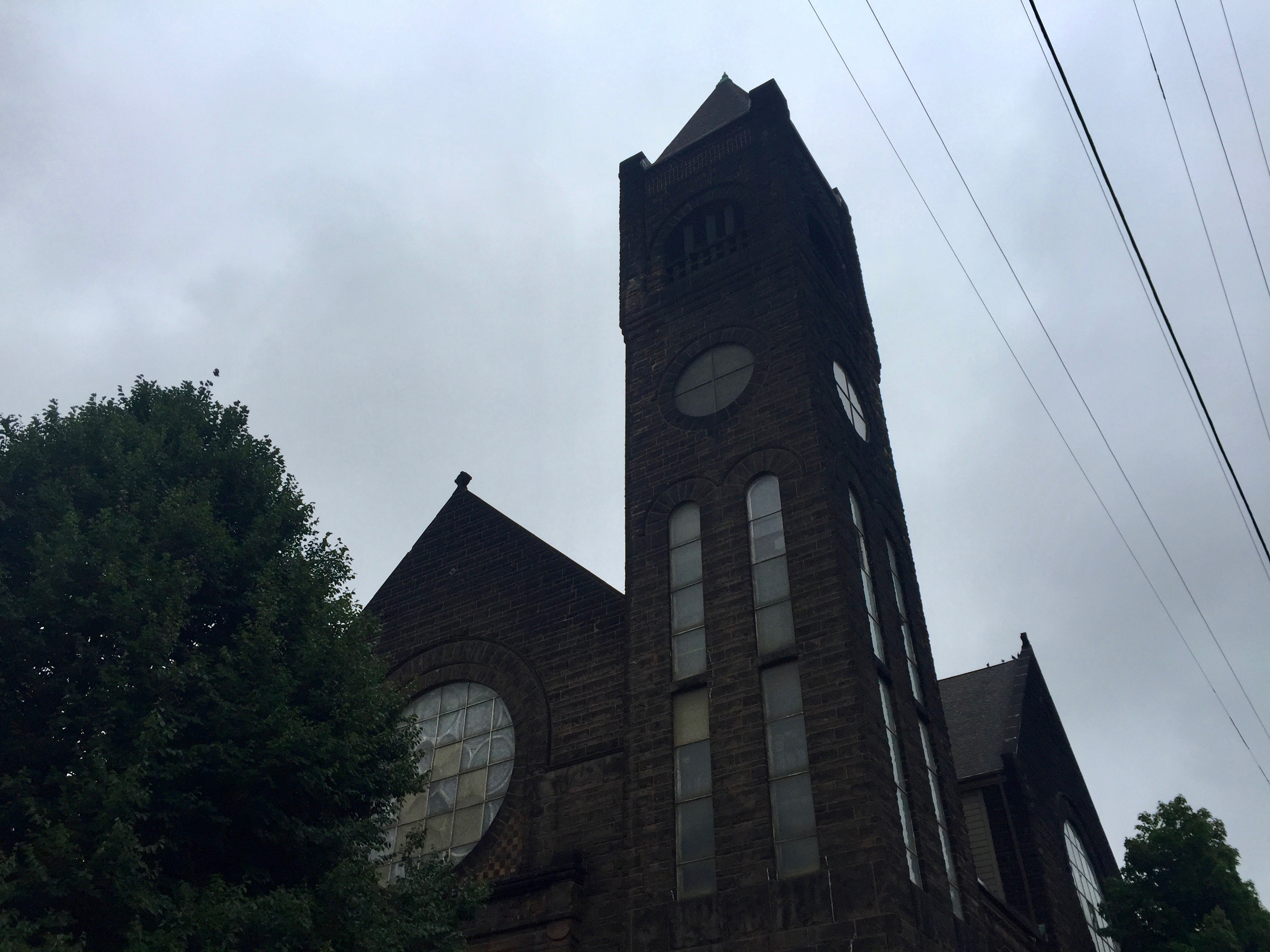

- Location within Cleveland Location within Ohio Location within the United States
- Location: 2592 W. 14th St., Cleveland, Ohio
- Coordinates: 41°28′37″N 81°41′31″W
- Area: Less than 1 acre (0.40 ha)
- Built: 1894
- Architect: Sidney R. Badgley; Jacob Schade
- Architectural style: Richardsonian Romanesque
- NRHP reference No.: 76001399
- Added to NRHP: March 17, 1976

Pilgrim Congregational Church is a historic congregation of the United Church of Christ in Cleveland, Ohio, United States. Constructed in the 1890s for a congregation founded in the 1850s, it was named a historic site in the 1970s.

Congregationalists began operating a Sunday school in Cleveland's Tremont neighborhood in 1854, and their efforts resulted in the creation of a church five years later. The members began construction of their first church building in 1865, although it was not completed until 1870. It was suitable for the congregation's needs for only a short time, as construction on the present building was started just 23 years after the first building was finished. The name "Pilgrim Congregational Church" was adopted in 1894 upon the completion of the present building; they had been styled "Heights Congregational Church" into the 1870s and used the name "Jennings Avenue Congregational Church" in the 1880s. The building was a community landmark from its earliest years — electric wiring was included in the original construction at a time when no other Cleveland buildings west of the Cuyahoga River had electricity.

Designed by prominent Cleveland architect Sidney Badgley, Pilgrim Congregational cost approximately $150,000 to complete. It is a generally square building typical of the Richardsonian Romanesque style, distinguished by exterior elements such as prominent rose windows on the northern and eastern sides. At the time of construction, the church was deeply involved in social programs in the community; rooms such as recreation space for young men, a library, and a gymnasium take up two-thirds of the building. The tallest section of the church is a square corner tower with a pointed roof; tall arched windows occupy much of its height, with circular windows and a belfry between the arched windows and the top of the tower. The main entrance also is through an arch, placed at the top of a wide flight of stairs.

In 1976, Pilgrim Congregational Church was listed on the National Register of Historic Places, qualifying both because of its place in local history and because of its historically significant architecture, which when completed was called an "epoch-making church building"; just four years after the building was erected, the plans had been used as an example of the latest ecclesiastical architecture at the Paris Exhibition at the turn of the century. It was one of twenty Cuyahoga County locations added to the Register in 1976.
