= Paris Hill Historic District =

Historic district in Maine, United States

- U.S. National Register of Historic Places
- U.S. Historic district
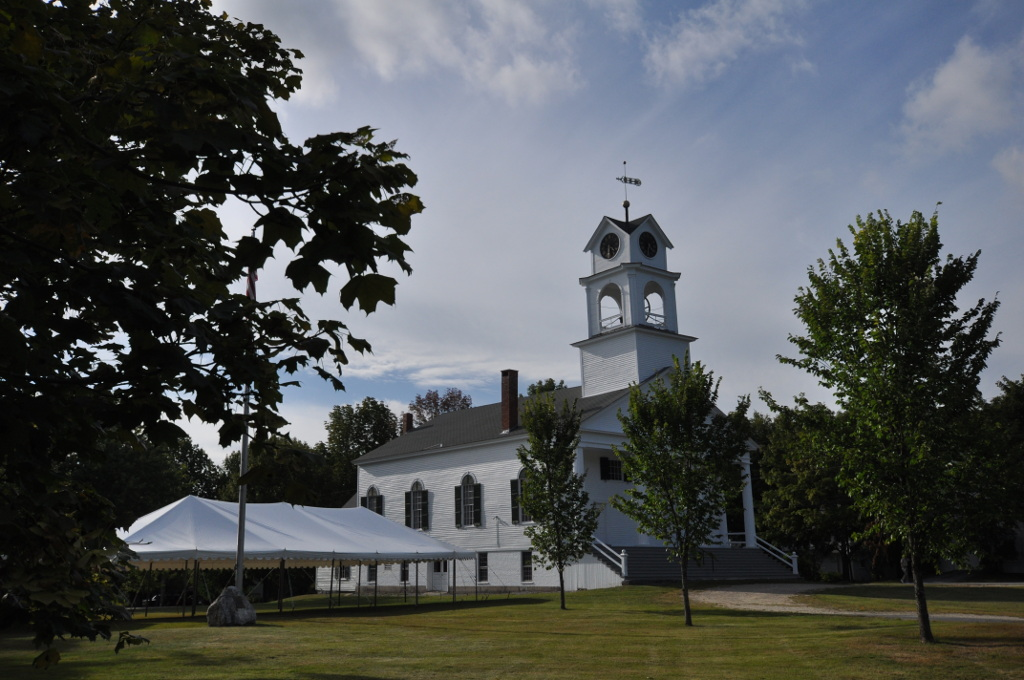
- Paris Hill Baptist Church

- Location within Maine Location within the United States
- Location: Main St. and Hannibal Hamlin Dr. E to Mt. Mica and Christian Ridge Rds., Paris Hill, Maine
- Coordinates: 44.26118°N 70.49799°W
- Area: 250 acres (100 ha)
- Built: 1789
- Architect: Multiple
- Architectural style: Greek Revival, Federal, Italianate
- NRHP reference No.: 73000243
- Added to NRHP: June 19, 1973

The Paris Hill Historic District encompasses the historic 19th century village of Paris Hill in Paris, Maine. This village was the primary civic seat in the town, which is also the county seat of Oxford County, and was where county facilities were located until they were moved to South Paris in 1895. The district includes a collection of well-preserved residential, civic, and religious structures dating roughly from 1800 to 1860, and was listed on the National Register of Historic Places in 1973.

== Description ==
The village of Paris Hill occupies the top of Paris Hill, which at 831 feet (253 m) above sea level provides commanding views of the White Mountains to the west. The main road through the district is Paris Hill Road, and its central point is the former county common, which is roughly circumscribed by Hannibal Hamlin Drive. The village extends for a short way along Lincoln and Tremont Streets; the total area of the district is about 250 acres (100 ha).

Most of the houses built in the district were built between 1800 and 1860, with almost none coming after the relocation of the county facilities in 1895. The oldest house, the Lemuel Jackson, Jr. House, was built in 1789. Most of the buildings are either Federal or Greek Revival in their styling, although there are a fair number of Italianate houses, as well as one mansard-roofed Second Empire house. Only one commercial building has survived on the hill: it was built c. 1808 by Simeon Cummings, and converted to a residence by his son.

The buildings formerly associated with county functions have been well preserved. Arrayed around the common on Hannibal Hamlin Drive, these include a courthouse, brick office building, and stone jail, the latter now repurposed to house a library. Also on the common is the Baptist Church, a Greek Revival structure built in 1838.

== History ==
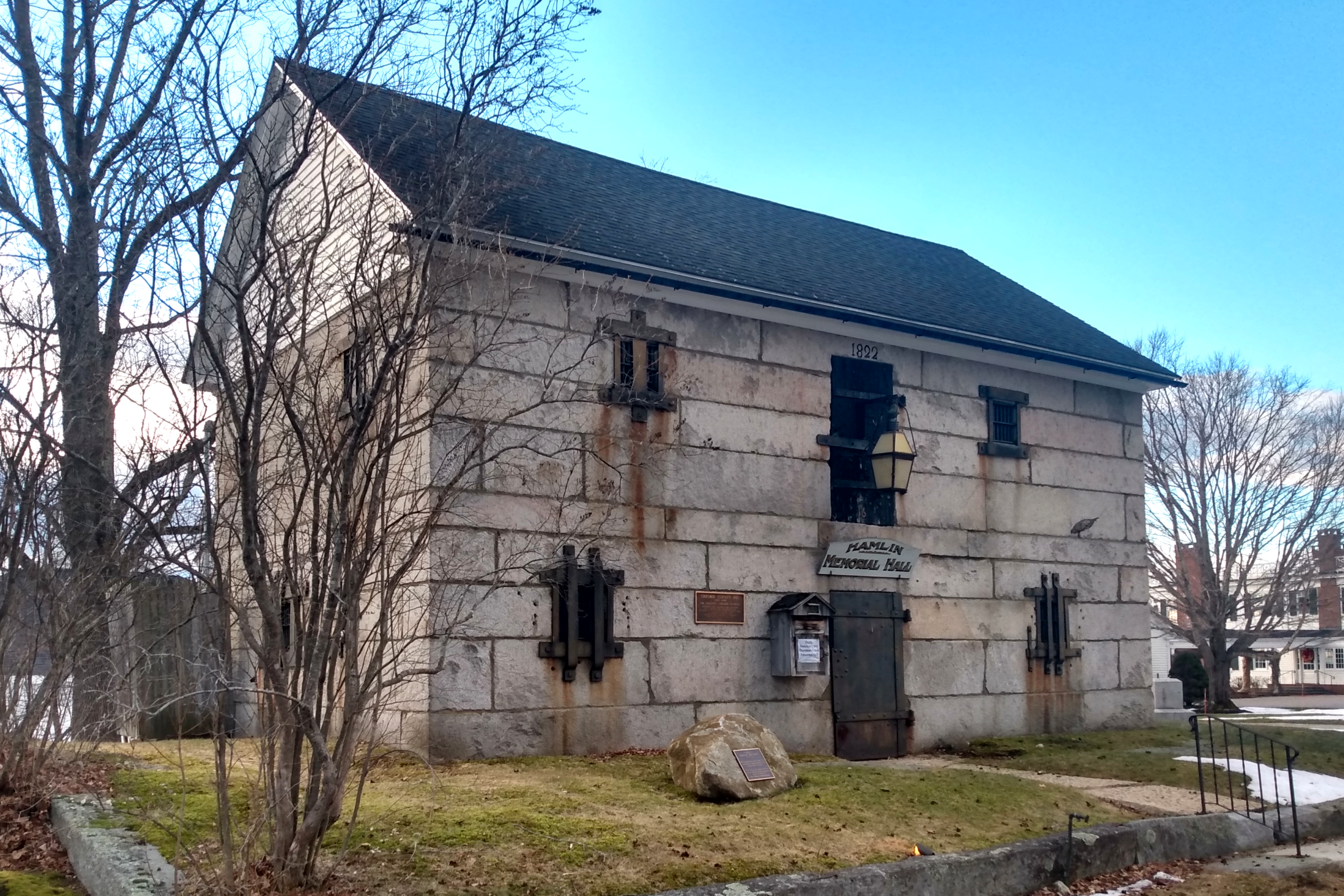
The Hannibal Hamlin Memorial Library and Museum

Paris Hill was originally known as "Jackson Hill", after the owner of the land at its top. The Paris area was settled beginning about 1780, and the town was incorporated in 1793. Oxford County was established in 1805, and Paris was chosen as its county seat. As Paris Hill was then the civic center of the town, the county infrastructure was built there, as were the Baptist Church and the Paris Hill Academy (the latter in 1856).

Because the village was not near any source of waterpower, needed for industrial activity, economic influence began to shift toward South Paris in the first half of the 19th century, and became more significant on the second half with the arrival of the railroad at South Paris in 1847. Although a number of smaller business flourished in Paris Hill, most of them eventually relocated to South Paris, and the county facilities were relocated there in 1895. The village is now maintained by the efforts of both year-round and summer residents.

A number of politicians notable in Maine history are known to have lived in Paris Hill. The most famous is Hannibal Hamlin (1809-1891), who served as United States Vice President during Abraham Lincoln's first term; he was born in Paris Hill. Hamlin, along with Paris Hill residents Enoch Lincoln, Sidney Perham, and Albion Keith Parris, also served as Governor of Maine.

== See also ==
- National Register of Historic Places listings in Oxford County, Maine
