= Lamson House =

House Constructed by Sidney Badgley

Coordinates: 41°23′59.3″N 81°32′15.1″W

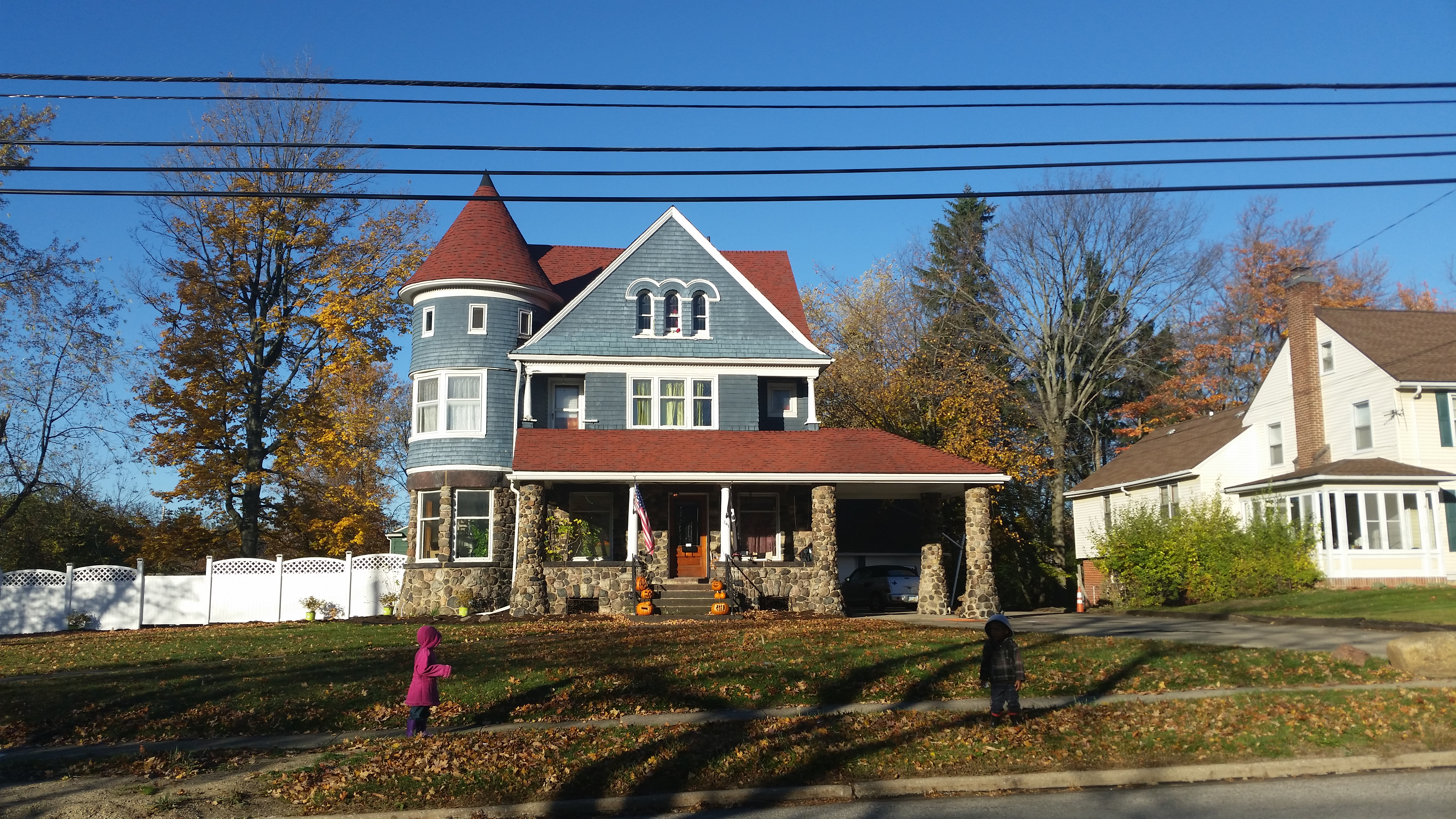
The Lamson House in Bedford, Ohio

The Lamson House is located at 241 Center Road in Bedford, Ohio. It was built in 1899 for William F. Lamson. The Lamson Family were wealthy and prominent land owners in Bedford. It was designed by architect Sidney Badgley. It is one of the few residential properties designed by Sidney Badgley that is still standing and occupied, as most have been razed due to abandonment, neglect, or age.
