= Highland Park Presbyterian Church (Michigan) =

Historic church in Michigan, United States

- U.S. National Register of Historic Places
- Michigan State Historic Site
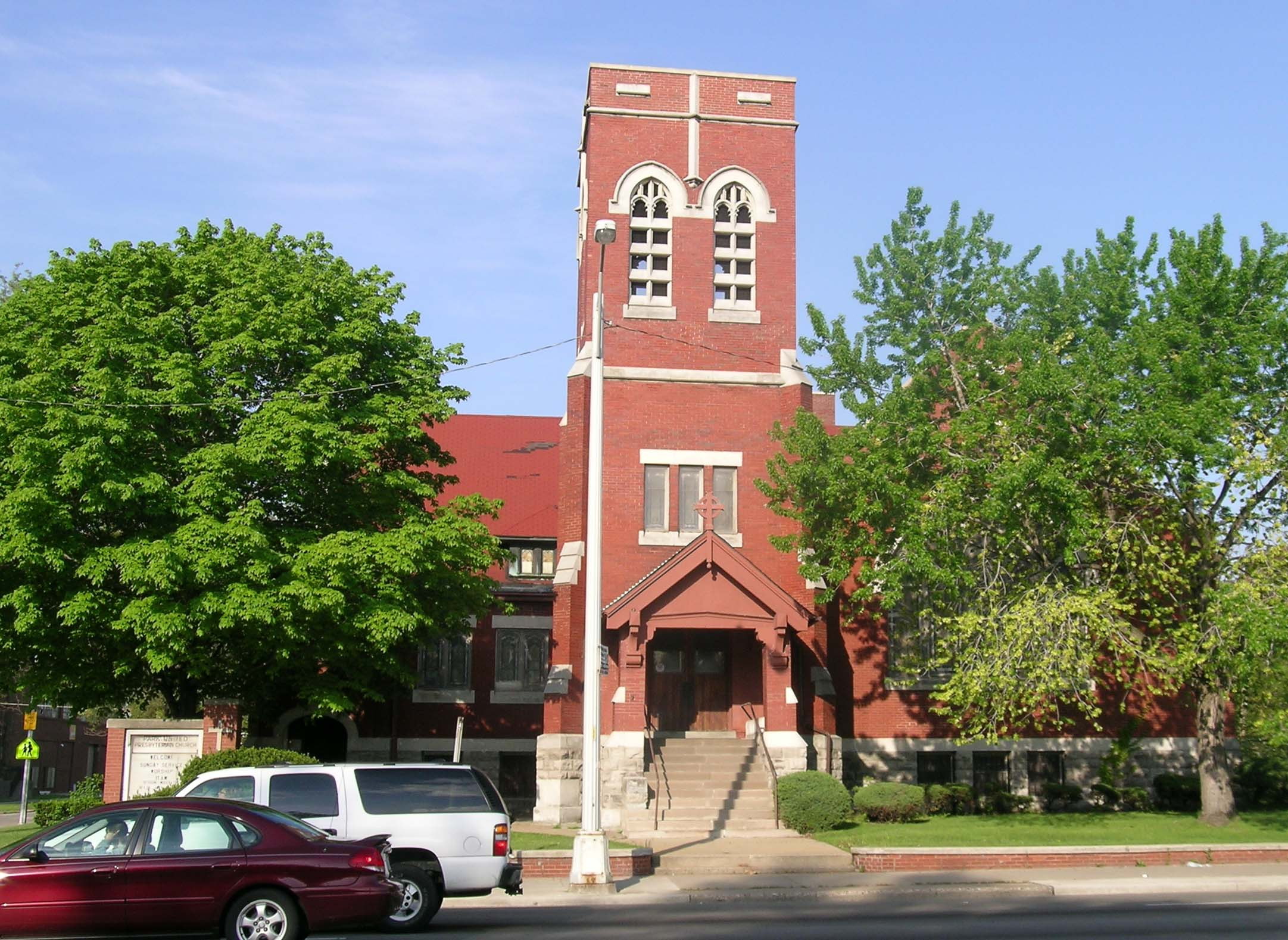
- Highland Park Presbyterian Church from across Woodward
- Interactive map
- Location: 14 Cortland Street; Highland Park, Michigan
- Coordinates: 42°23′48″N 83°5′30″W
- Built: 1910
- Architect: Sidney Rose Badgley; William H. Nicklas
- MPS: Religious Structures of Woodward Ave. TR
- NRHP reference No.: 82002920

Significant dates
- Added to NRHP: August 3, 1982
- Designated MSHS: August 12, 1983

The Park United Presbyterian Church is located at 14 Cortland Street (at the intersection with Woodward Avenue) in Highland Park, Michigan. It was built in 1910 as the Highland Park Presbyterian Church, listed on the National Register of Historic Places in 1982, and designated a Michigan State Historic Site in 1983. It is a member of The Presbyterian Church (U.S.A.), and continues to offer services.

== History ==
The Highland Park Presbyterian Church was established in 1893 as a mission church of the First Presbyterian Church of Detroit. Three years later a small chapel was built on the site of the present church. However, the congregation grew to over two hundred members, and the present building was constructed from 1910 to 1911. In 1972, the Highland Park Presbyterian Church merged with the nearby Palmer Park Presbyterian Church to form the Park United Presbyterian Church. The merged congregations met in the Highland Park building.

== Architecture ==
The church is 110 feet long and 85 feet wide, and is constructed in a Tudor Gothic style from red brick with limestone trim and red terra cotta roof tiles. The main section of the church contains an oversized stained-glass window and a square, buttressed, flat-roofed, corner tower with a louvered belfry is located on the south side. A gabled wooden porch covers the entrance. Set back from the main block is the gabled educational wing. A parsonage, built in 1905, sits behind the church on Cortland Street.
