= Calvary Baptist Church (Providence, Rhode Island) =

Historic church in Rhode Island, United States

- U.S. National Register of Historic Places
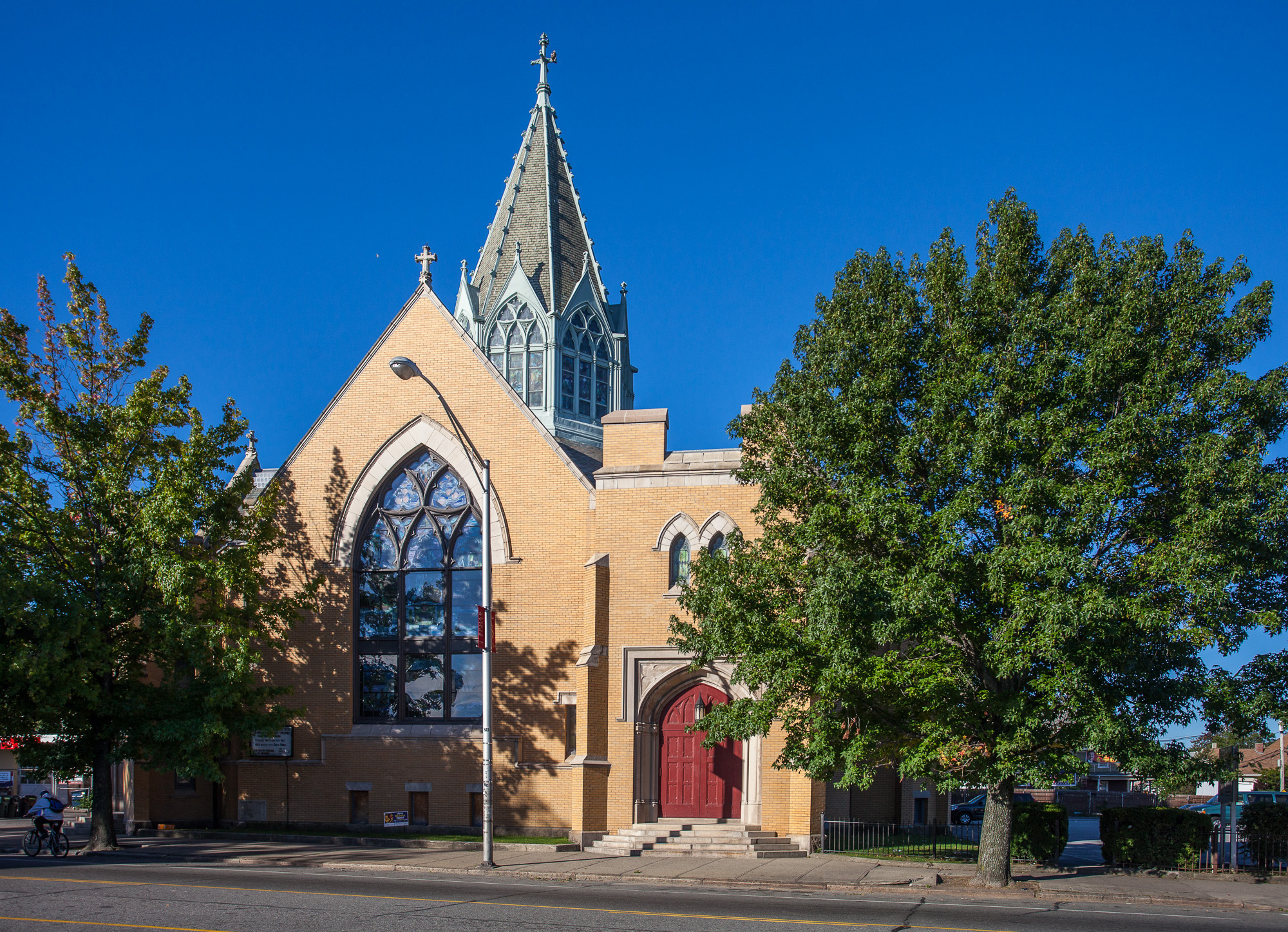

- Location within Rhode Island Location within the United States
- Location: 747 Broad Street, Providence, Rhode Island
- Coordinates: 41°48′13″N 71°24′29″W
- Built: 1897
- Architect: Sidney Rose Badgley, Arthur Eaton Hill
- Architectural style: Late Gothic Revival
- MPS: Elmwood MRA
- NRHP reference No.: 80000089
- Added to NRHP: January 7, 1980

The Calvary Baptist Church is an historic church in Providence, Rhode Island.

In 1854, the First Baptist Church of South Providence and Fifth Baptist Church merged to form Friendship Baptist Church. The congregation constructed the current building in two phases. In the first, a small chapel (now facing Stanwood Street) was designed by Sidney Rose Badgley and built in 1897. Rapid growth of the congregation meant this space was inadequate soon after it was completed, and the larger main sanctuary, a Gothic Revival octagonal-roof structure drawn from plans by Badgley and Arthur Easton Hill, was built in 1905–1907. After moving to the new location the church was renamed Calvary Baptist Church. The church meeting house was added to the National Register of Historic Places in 1980. The congregation is currently affiliated with the American Baptist Churches/USA (ABCUSA).

== See also ==
- National Register of Historic Places listings in Providence, Rhode Island
