= Woodward Avenue Presbyterian Church =

Historic church in Michigan, United States

- U.S. National Register of Historic Places
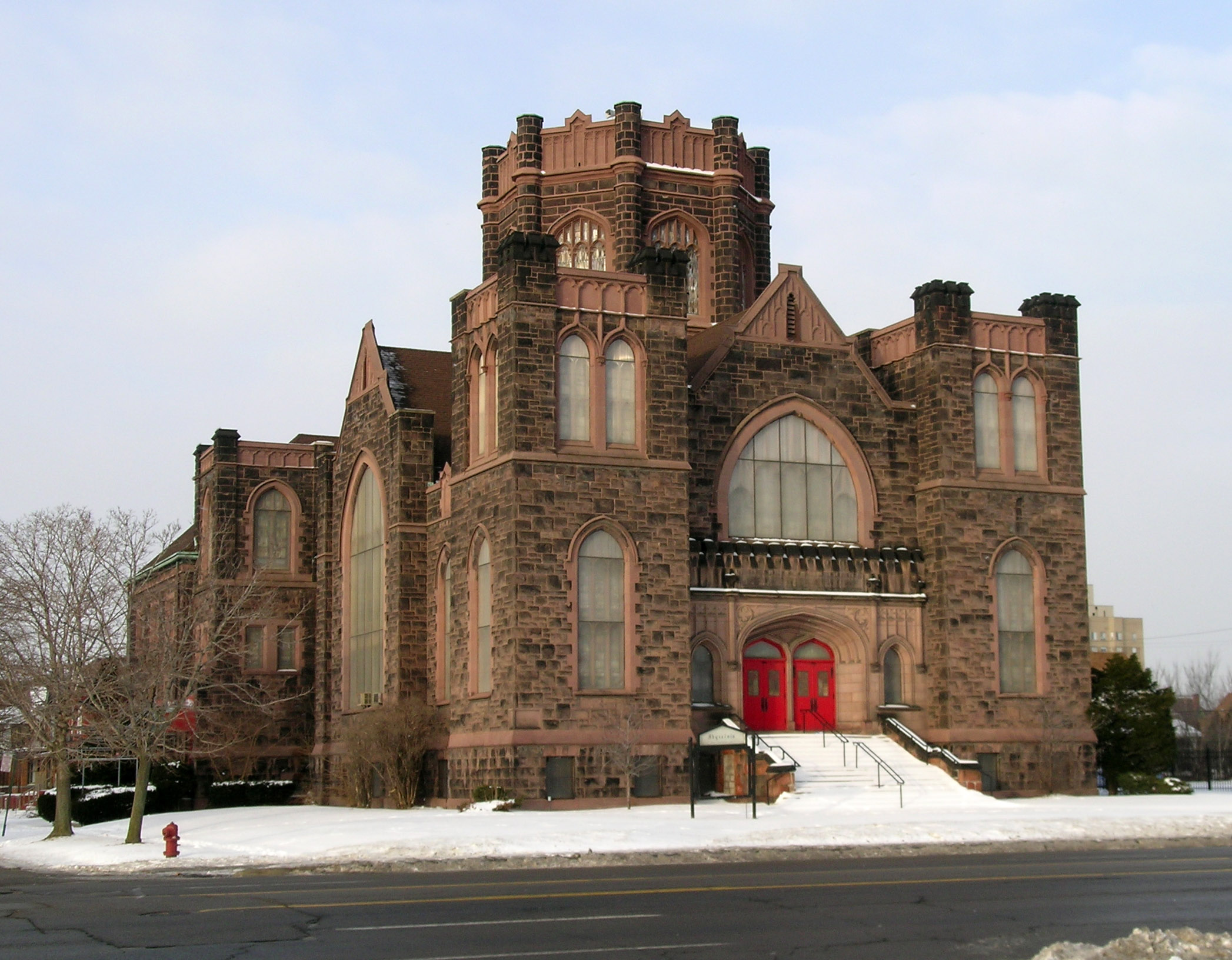
- Church façade from Woodward
- Interactive map
- Location: 8501 Woodward Avenue; Detroit, Michigan
- Coordinates: 42°22′40.52″N 83°4′46″W
- Built: 1911
- Architect: Sidney Badgley
- Architectural style: Late Gothic Revival
- MPS: Religious Structures of Woodward Ave. TR
- NRHP reference No.: 82002916
- Added to NRHP: August 3, 1982

The Woodward Avenue Presbyterian Church is a church located at 8501 Woodward Avenue in Detroit, Michigan. Built in 1911 in the Gothic Revival style, the architect was Sidney Badgley. It was used for some time as the Abyssinia Church of God in Christ. The building was listed on the National Register of Historic Places in 1982.

== History ==
By 1908, the Presbyterians in Detroit recognized the need for a church to serve congregants located in what was then the "north" Woodward area. Meetings were held and the congregation was organized by the presbytery on March 17, 1908. The church had 163 members.

Rev. Sherman L. Divine was installed as the congregation's first minister, and he embarked on an ambitious building project, envisioning a sanctuary that would cost about $100,000 ($3,583,333 in 2025 dollars). The church enlisted new members and new funding. Tracy and Katherine McGregor donated a lot along Woodward, and the cornerstone for the church was laid on January 1, 1910. Construction began, based on a design by Sidney Rose Badgley. The church was dedicated on June 23 of the next year.

Membership surpassed 2200 by 1921. However, by the 1950s, many members were leaving Detroit for the northern suburbs. Woodward Avenue Presbyterian Church began to struggle, with fewer than 1000 members in 1961 and only 404 in 1971. In 1981, Woodward Avenue Presbyterian merged with Covenant Church. The combined churches still had fewer than 500 members, and by 1991 there were only 210. In 1993, the congregation split from the Presbyterian church, eventually becoming the Abyssinia Interdenominational Church under Pastor Gary Douglas. The church closed on the death of the pastor in 2005. Woodward Avenue Presbyterian was abandoned, and has fallen into disrepair.

Owners changed hands several times but none had the finances to keep up such a large property. The building then was bought at a foreclosure sale by an information technology company that had also purchased an adjacent building. In a 2018 television interview the company's executive outlined plans to restore the building for the community. As of January 2019 the company had replaced the roof and were in the process of interior cleanup and structural stabilization. However in July the technology company was debared from doing business with the city until 2026 after bribing a city official for business contracts. As of 2020 there was no update on any further repairs.

== Architecture ==
Woodward Avenue Presbyterian is an English Gothic-style church, faced with rough rock and trimmed with a contrasting limestone, and measuring 184 feet long by 104 feet wide. The Woodward Avenue façade boasts a massive carved-stone entrance with a traceried stained glass window set above; two square towers flank the center entrance. Along the side, gabled transepts contain full-height traceried windows. A two-story educational wing, built at the same time as the main church building, abuts the rear. A lantern dome, raised above the roofline, lights the auditorium.

=== Gallery ===
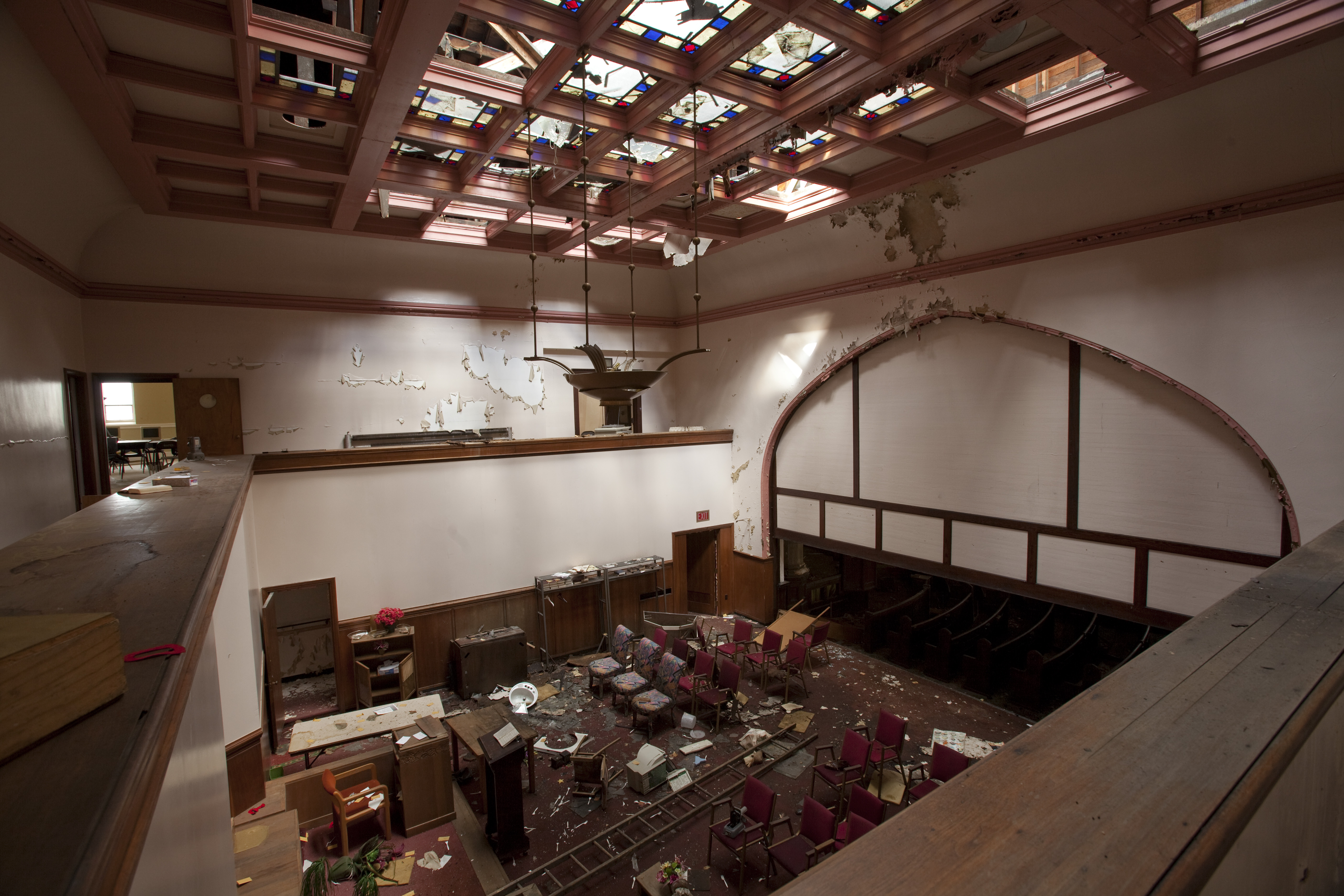
auxiliary seating, separated from the sanctuary by a sliding panel

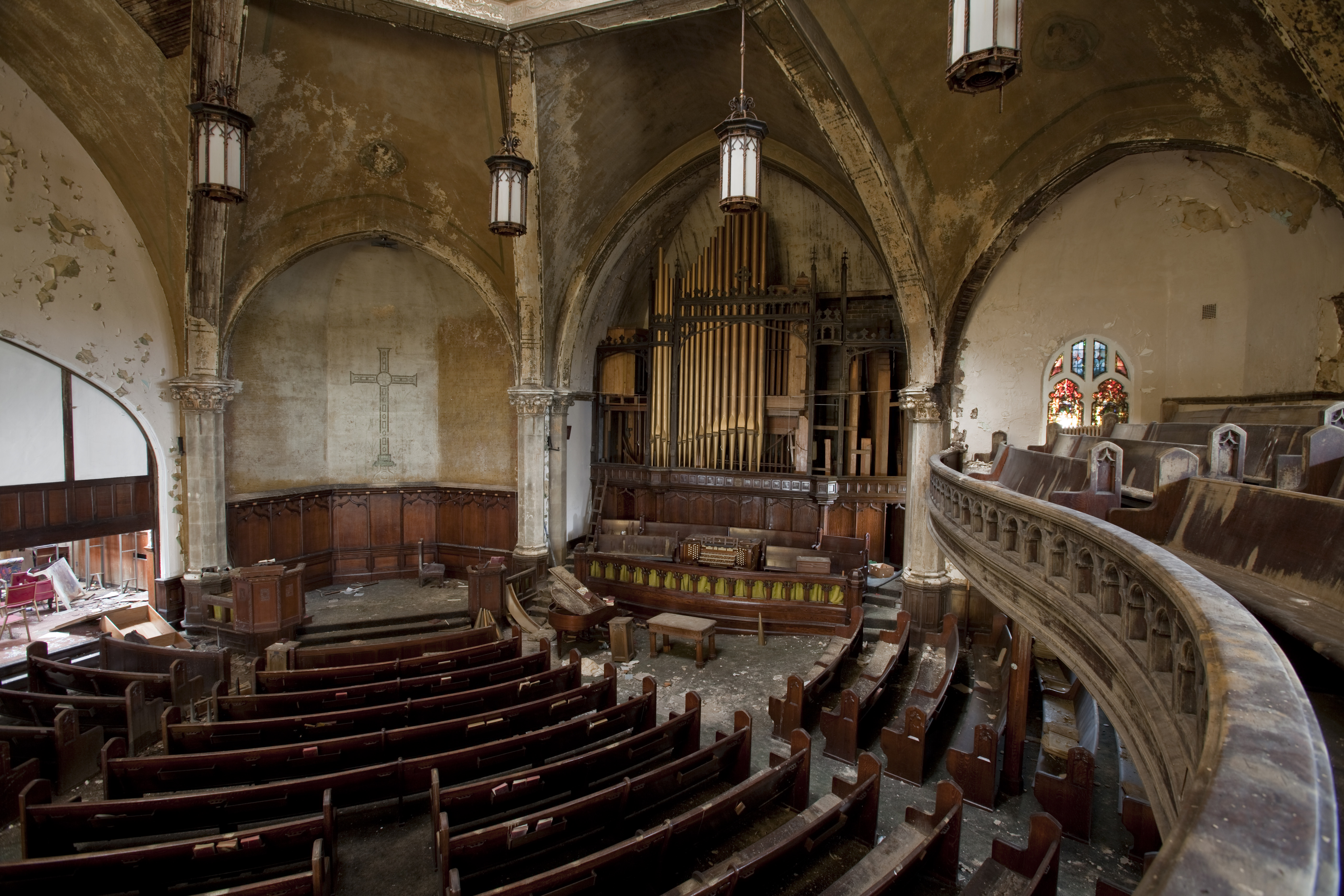

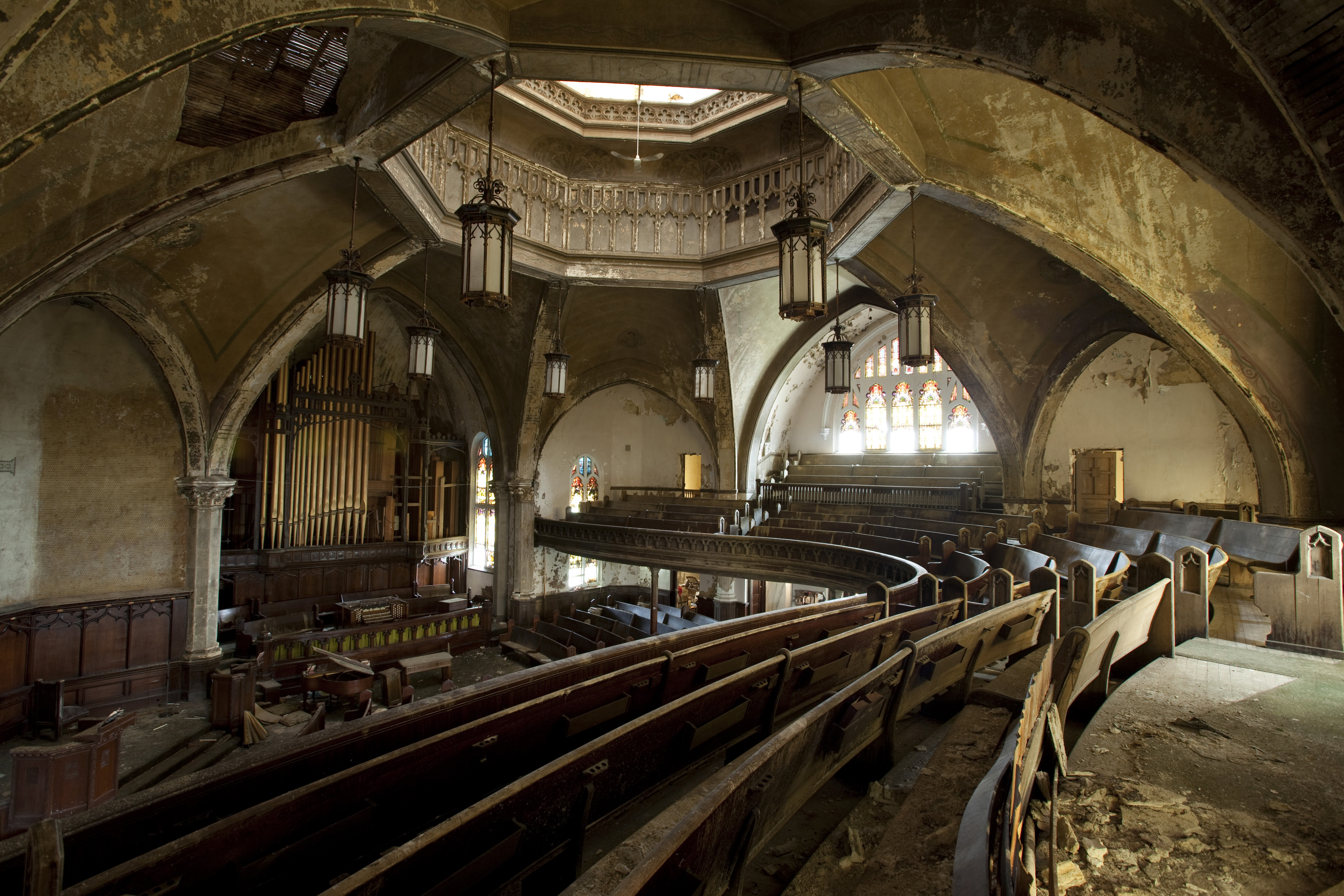

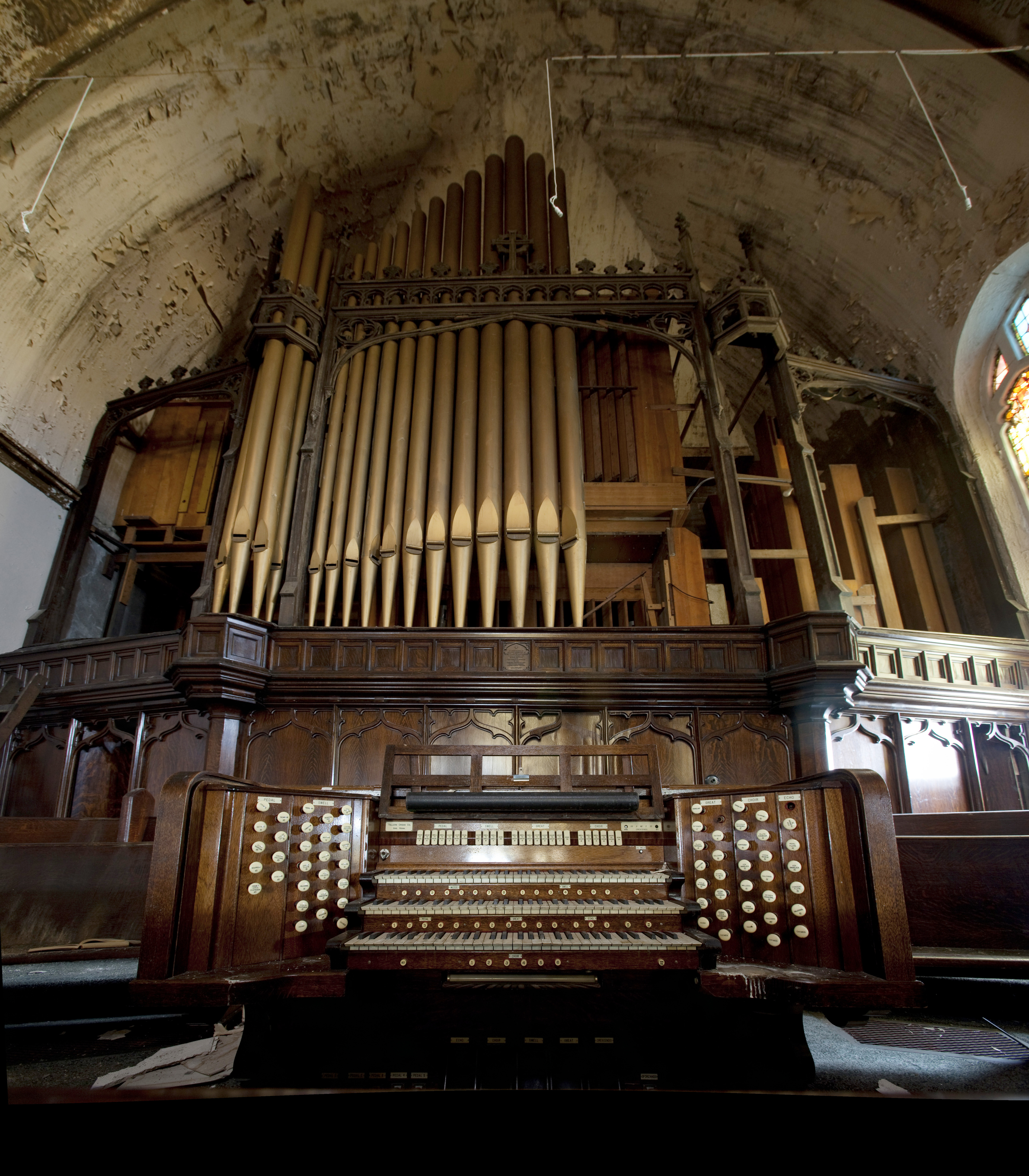
