= William Deering =

American businessman and philanthropist (1826-1913)

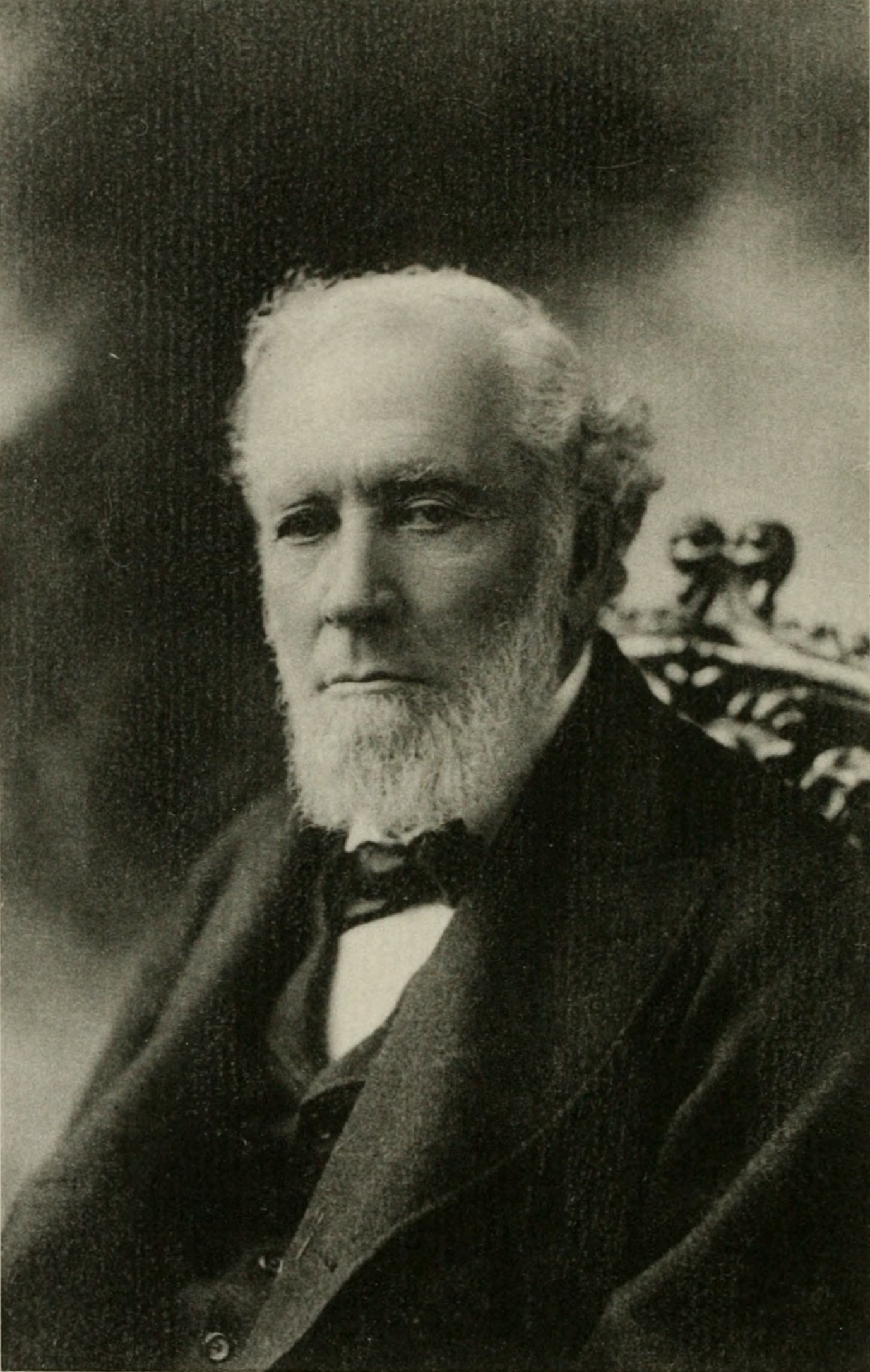
- Deering in 1899
- Born: April 25, 1826; South Paris, Maine, U.S.
- Died: December 9, 1913 (aged 87); Coconut Grove, Florida, U.S.
- Burial place: Graceland Cemetery
- Occupations: Businessman; philanthropist
- Known for: Founding the Deering Harvester Company which later merged with the McCormick Harvesting Machine Co. to form International Harvester
- Spouse(s): Abby Reed Barbour (? - c.1856 death); Clara Barbour Cummings Hamilton (1857- ?)
- Children: Charles Deering; James Deering; Abby Marion Deering

William Deering (April 25, 1826 – December 9, 1913) was an American businessman and philanthropist. He inherited a woolen mill in Maine, but made his fortune in later life with the Deering Harvester Company.

== Life ==
=== Early life ===
Deering was born April 25, 1826, in South Paris, Maine. In 1850, he moved to Plano, Illinois and Iowa and invested in the farmland of the area. In 1856 he returned to Portland, Maine, and in the early 1860s he secured a contract producing uniform coats and pants for the Union Army. This was apparently a successful venture, and after the war Deering opened a dry goods business called Deering, Milliken & Company.

=== Marriages ===
William Deering married Abby Reed Barbour who gave birth to Charles in 1852. Abby died when Charles was only four and Deering went on to marry Clara Barbour Cummings Hamilton in 1857. The couple had two children, James and Abby.

=== Deering Harvester Company ===
Around 1870, Deering left that business and partnered with Elijah Gammon, providing $40,000 in funding for the production of a horse-drawn grain harvester developed by brothers William and Charles Marsh. By 1872 the company showed $80,000 in profits, and in 1873 the name was changed to Gammon & Deering Co. to reflect Deering's management role. By 1879 Deering was the sole owner and the company's name had been changed to Deering Manufacturing Company.

Along with the Marsh harvester, the company pioneered a harvesting reaper incorporating an automatic twine binder invented by John Appleby of Beloit, Wisconsin. Deering Manufacturing Company produced and sold 3,000 of Appleby's twine-tie binder for the 1880 harvest, with profits above $400,000. In 1880, Deering moved the company to Chicago and established the Deering Harvester Works.

Deering was also responsible for building a modern twine factory to supply farmers with sufficient length and quality of twine to work with the binders, a move followed by most competitors. He conducted several experiments and determined that the ideal binder twine would be made of manila, spun to 700 feet per pound.

=== Reorganization and merger ===
The Deering Company and the reorganized Plano Harvester Company, which had moved to Pullman, competed aggressively with each other and the McCormick Harvesting Machine Company, but in 1902, under his son's direction, all three companies merged to form the International Harvester Company.

=== Philanthropy ===
William Deering financially supported several institutions of Chicago, the Northwestern University, the Garrett-Evangelical Theological Seminary, and the Wesley Hospital among them. He gave Northwestern over $1 million over the years, and served on the university's board for 38 years, including 10 years (1895–1905) as president of the board; he declined an offer to rename the school Deering University.

=== Later years ===
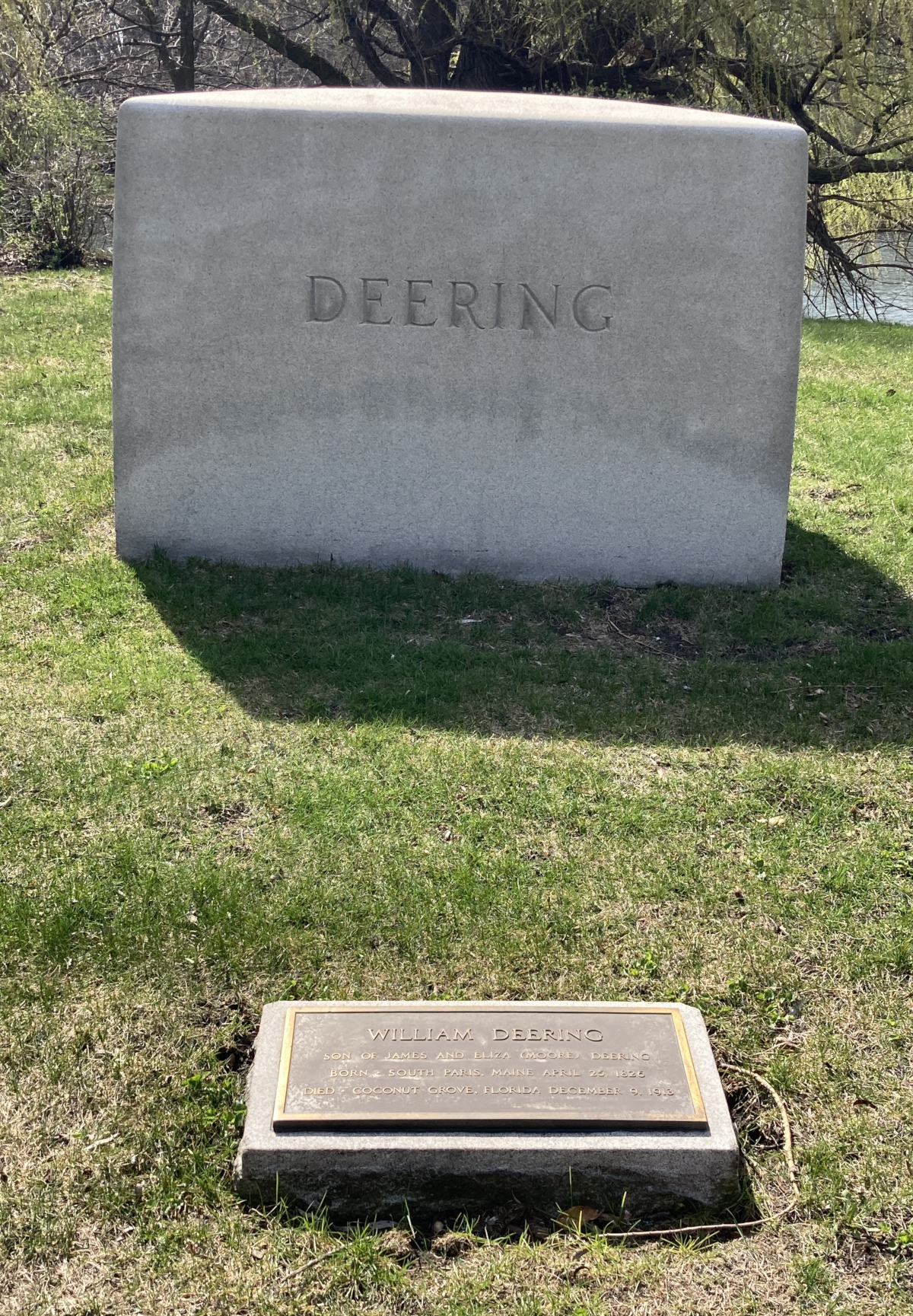
Deering's grave at Graceland Cemetery

After Deering retired in 1901 he spent a large part of each year at his winter home in Coconut Grove, Florida. He died on December 9, 1913, in Coconut Grove with his two sons in attendance. He was the father of Charles Deering (1852–1927) and James Deering (1859–1925). The Deering Library at Northwestern is named for the family. An 1899 portrait of him by Anders Zorn hangs in the library. He was buried at Graceland Cemetery in Chicago.

== Legacy ==
In the late 1890s, Deering scouted territory in Southeast Missouri for timber and purchased 60,000 acres of land in Pemiscot and Dunklin Counties. A lumber town, fifteen miles west of Caruthersville, is named after him.
