= South Paris, Maine =

- Census-designated place
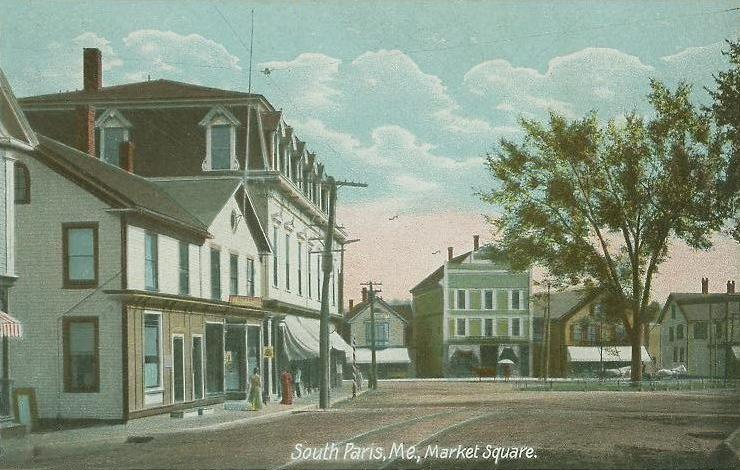
- Market Square in 1907

- Location within Maine Location within the United States
- Coordinates: 44°13′35″N 70°30′23″W
- Country: United States
- State: Maine
- County: Oxford

Area
  - Total: 3.95 sq mi (10.23 km^{2})
  - Land: 3.88 sq mi (10.04 km^{2})
  - Water: 0.073 sq mi (0.19 km^{2})
- Elevation: 331 ft (101 m)

Population (2020)
  - Total: 2,183
  - Density: 563.2/sq mi (217.46/km^{2})
- Demonym: South Parisian
- Time zone: UTC-5 (Eastern (EST))
  - Summer (DST): UTC-4 (EDT)
- ZIP code: 04281
- Area code: 207
- FIPS code: 23-71780
- GNIS feature ID: 2377958

South Paris is a census-designated place (CDP) located within the town of Paris in Oxford County, Maine, United States. As of the 2020 census, South Paris had a population of 2,183. South Paris is included in the Lewiston-Auburn, Maine metropolitan New England City and Town Area. While the CDP refers only to the densely settled area in the southern part of the town of Paris, the entire town, outside of Paris Hill, is located within the South Paris ZIP code, resulting in many residents referring to the entire town as South Paris.

== History ==
On November 4, 1773, when the Proprietors were lotting out the township, they held a meeting at Coolidge Tavern in Watertown, Massachusetts and they voted that there be reserved for the use of the proprietors their heirs and assigns forever two rods in width on the eastward side of every range line through the length of the township for the conveniency of ways if it shall be needed, establishing rangeways to prevent landlocking and segregation in the township of Paris and West Paris.

During the 19th-century, the Little Androscoggin River provided water power to operate mills in South Paris, and the village grew up around them. The opening of the Atlantic and St. Lawrence Railroad on June 8, 1850, further spurred development of the small mill town. In the 1890s, the Oxford County Courthouse moved from Paris Hill to be near the Grand Trunk Railway station. Much of the manufacturing and industry faded with the Great Depression, but South Paris remains the commercial section of Paris, and retains much of its Victorian era architecture. Oxford Hills Comprehensive High School, the regional high school, was founded in South Paris in 1961. Actress Reta Shaw was born in South Paris in 1912.

== Geography ==
According to the United States Census Bureau, the CDP has a total area of 4.0 square miles (10.2 km^{2}), of which 3.9 square miles (10.0 km^{2}) is land and 0.1 square mile (0.2 km^{2}) (2.03%) is water. South Paris is drained by the Little Androscoggin River.

The town is crossed by Maine State Route 26, 117, 118 and 119. The town has a small park, Moore Park, with a new, fenced in playground for children to play in. Moore Park no longer has a water fountain, but there is a monument in the center with a gazebo to one side for public events.

== Demographics ==
Historical population
Census	Pop.	Note	%±
2020	2,183		—
U.S. Decennial Census

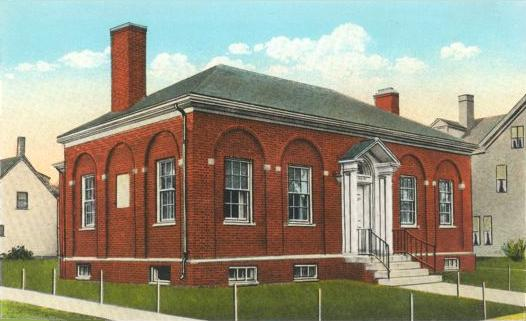
Paris Public Library, designed by John Calvin Stevens

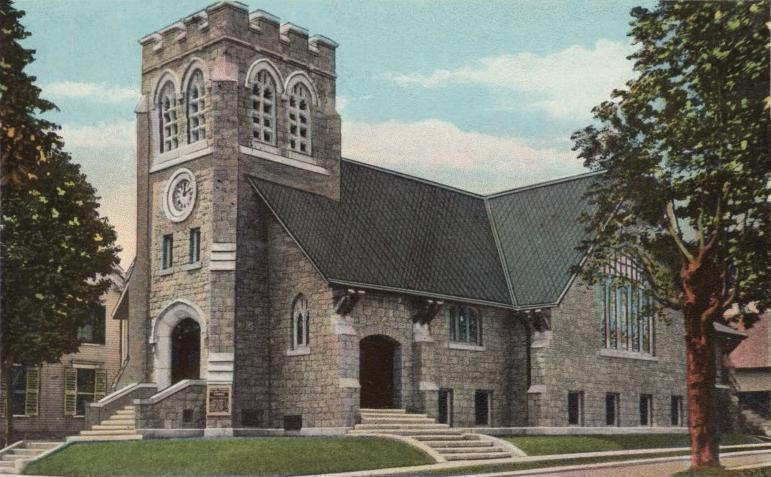
Deering Memorial Church, designed by Sidney Badgley

=== 2020 census ===
As of the 2020 census, South Paris had a population of 2,183. The median age was 47.8 years. 18.8% of residents were under the age of 18 and 25.6% of residents were 65 years of age or older. For every 100 females there were 84.7 males, and for every 100 females age 18 and over there were 89.1 males age 18 and over.

87.4% of residents lived in urban areas, while 12.6% lived in rural areas.

There were 1,024 households in South Paris, of which 24.1% had children under the age of 18 living in them. Of all households, 32.3% were married-couple households, 23.2% were households with a male householder and no spouse or partner present, and 33.1% were households with a female householder and no spouse or partner present. About 38.4% of all households were made up of individuals and 17.1% had someone living alone who was 65 years of age or older.

There were 1,111 housing units, of which 7.8% were vacant. The homeowner vacancy rate was 1.5% and the rental vacancy rate was 5.0%.

Racial composition as of the 2020 census
Race	Number	Percent
White	2,029	92.9%
Black or African American	10	0.5%
American Indian and Alaska Native	13	0.6%
Asian	6	0.3%
Native Hawaiian and Other Pacific Islander	0	0.0%
Some other race	14	0.6%
Two or more races	111	5.1%
Hispanic or Latino (of any race)	44	2.0%

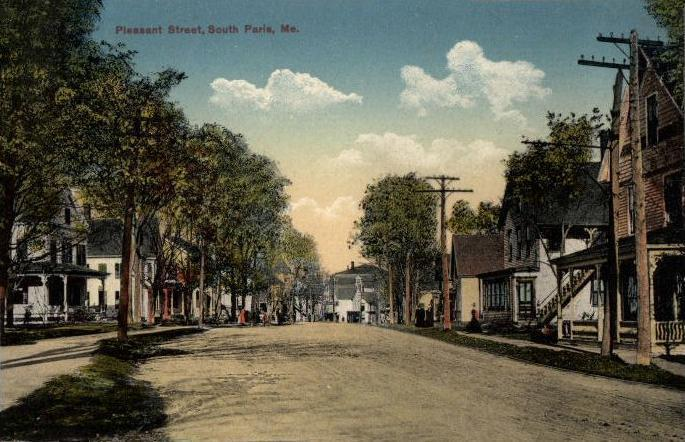
Pleasant Street in 1913

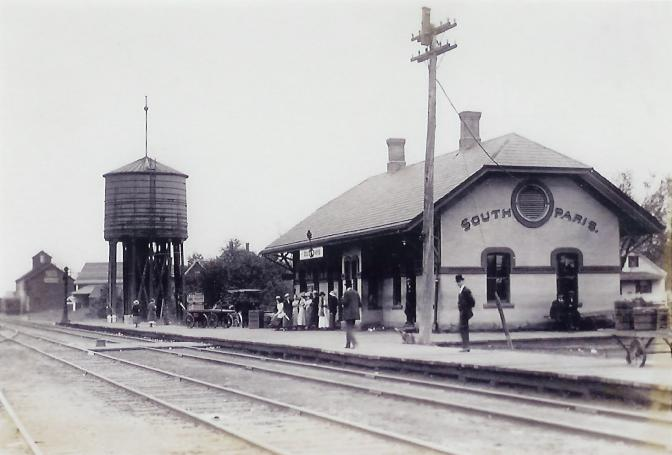
Railroad station c. 1915

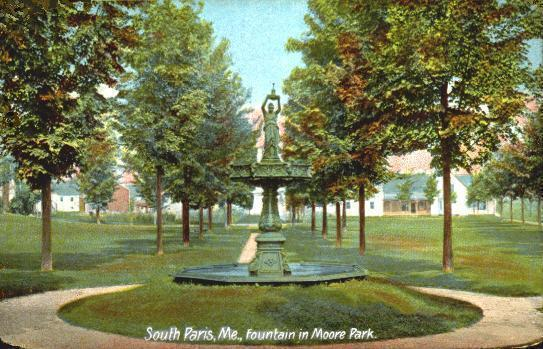
Moore Park in 1909

== Notable people ==
- Cora S. Briggs, organist and composer
- James Deering, industrial executive, socialite and antiquities collector
- Hannibal Hamlin, First vice president for Abraham Lincoln
- Reta Shaw, actress

== Sites of interest ==
- Celebration Barn Theater
- Paris Cape Historical Society
