= Whitman Memorial Library =

- U.S. National Register of Historic Places
- U.S. Historic district
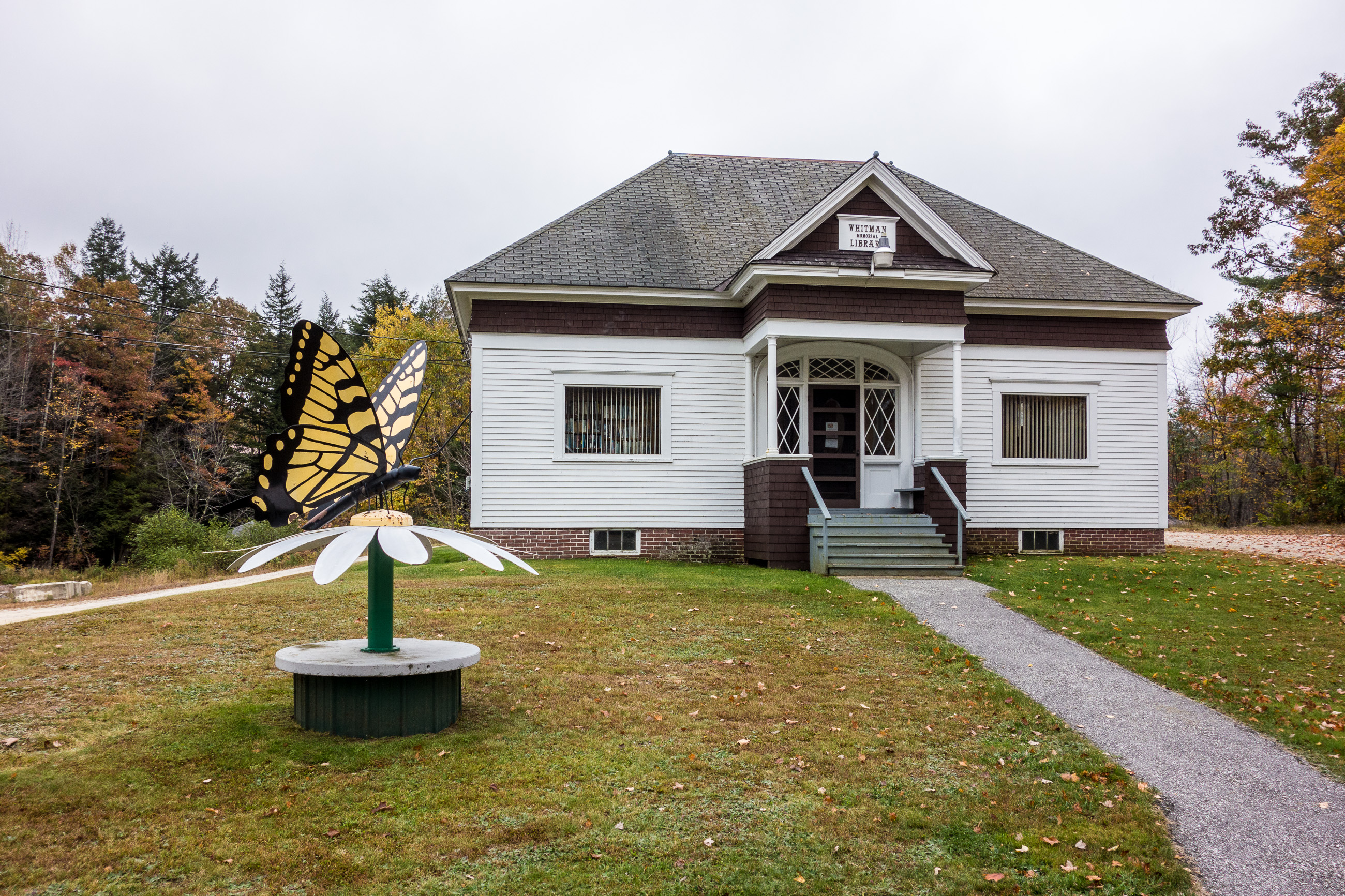
- Whitman Library in 2013

- Location within Maine Location within the United States
- Location: 1 mi. SW of jct. of ME 26 and ME 232, Bryant Pond, Maine
- Coordinates: 44°22′46″N 70°38′39″W
- Area: less than one acre
- Built: 1910
- Architect: Bacon, Alton H.
- Architectural style: Colonial Revival
- NRHP reference No.: 94001549
- Added to NRHP: January 12, 1995

The Whitman Memorial Library is the public library of Woodstock, Maine. It is located at 28 South Main Street (Maine State Route 26) in the village of Bryant Pond, in a small yet architecturally distinctive Colonial Revival building built at the library's founding in 1910. The building was listed on the National Register of Historic Places in 1995.

== Architecture and history ==
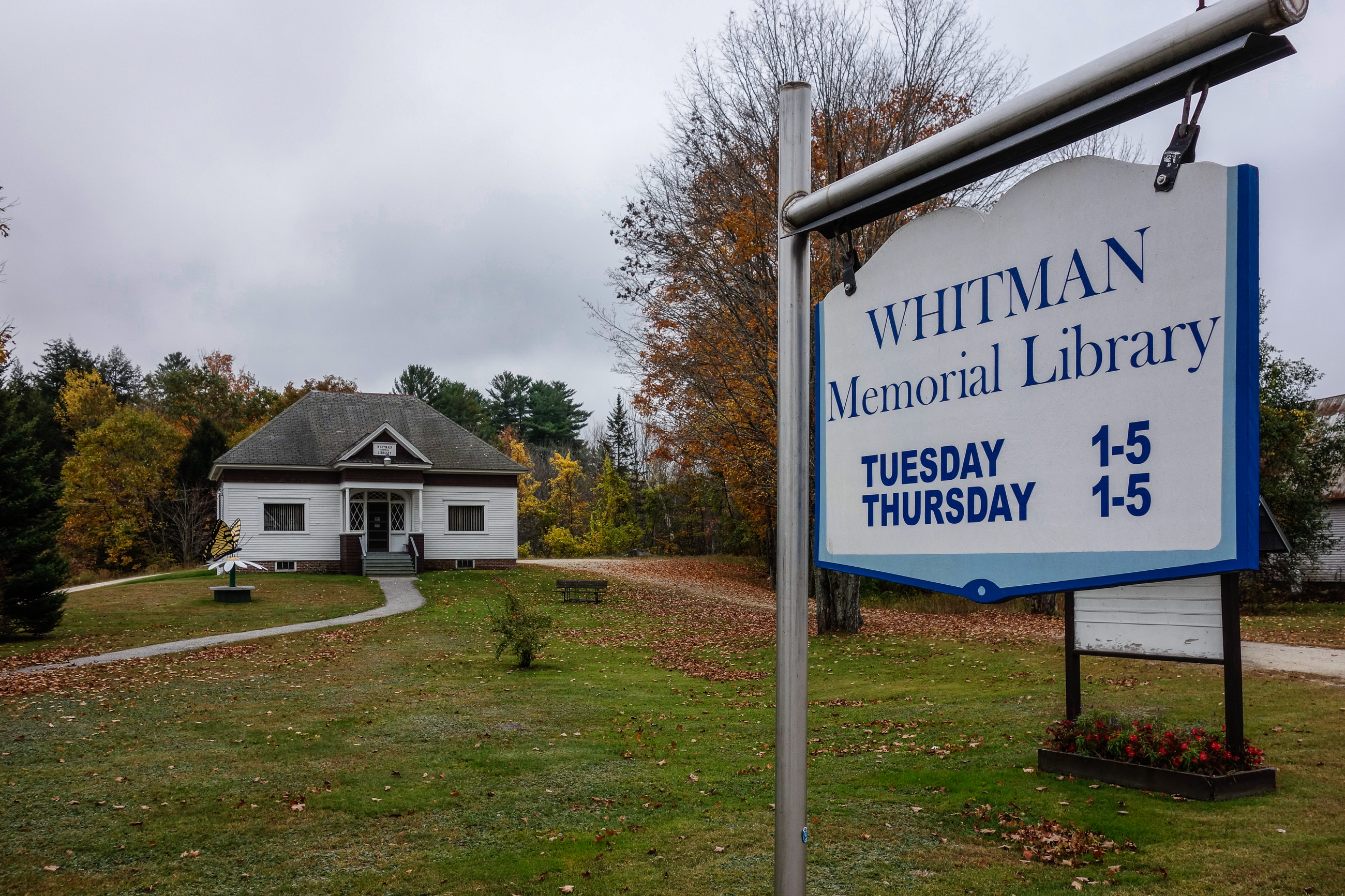
Library and sign in 2013

The library building is a T-shaped wood-frame building, set well back from the street on a grassy lot, with a stone wall (dating to the time of the building) and a memorial to the community's World War I soldiers. The building rests on a brick foundation, inside which a full concrete basement was later poured, and has a high-pitch hip roof. The building's main (north-facing) facade is three bays wide, with a central entrance flanked by large single-pane windows. The entrance is sheltered by a gable-roofed portico, supported by slender columns. It has diamond-pane sidelights and transom surrounding a panelled doorway. The interior of the building has retained all of its original woodwork and finish. It is organized in a typical early 20th-century plan, with a central librarian's desk with a reading room on one side and stacks on the other. A full basement was added in 1957.

The library was established by a bequest from longtime local residents Eleanor Bryant Whitman and Alanson M. Whitman, both descendants of early settlers of the area. The bequest required the town to provide land for the library, but provided funds for the construction and filling of the library's shelves.

== See also ==
- National Register of Historic Places listings in Oxford County, Maine
