= Former Fryeburg Town House =

- Fryeburg Town House, Former
- U.S. National Register of Historic Places
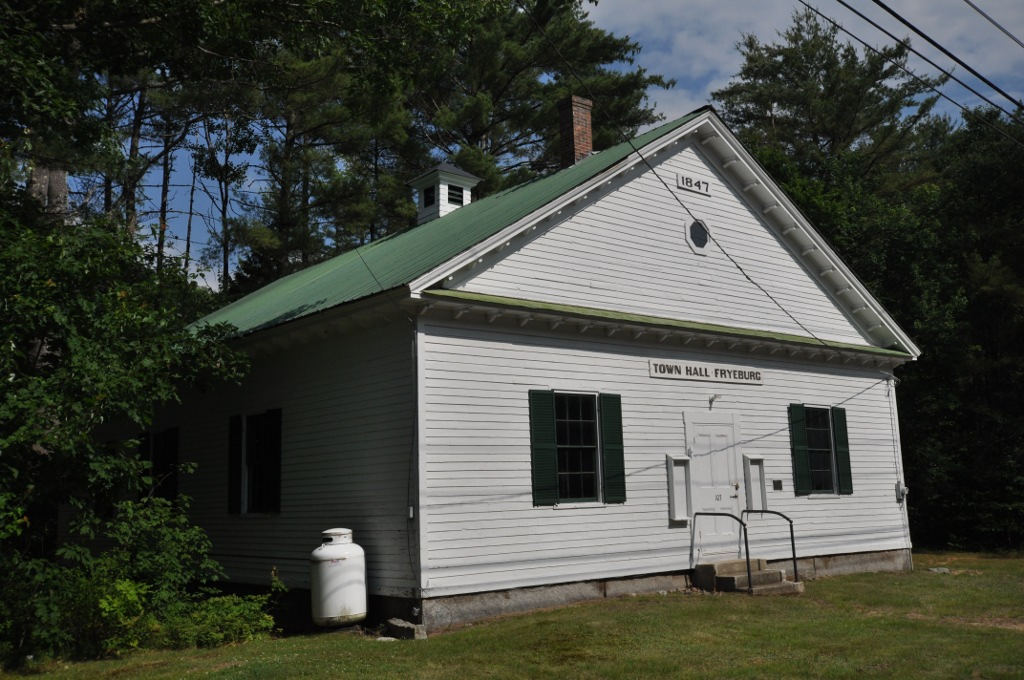

- Location within Maine Location within the United States
- Location: ME 5 E side, .1 mi. N of jct. with Corn Shop Rd., Fryeburg, Maine
- Coordinates: 44°4′14″N 70°56′43″W
- Area: less than one acre
- Built: 1847
- Architectural style: Greek Revival
- NRHP reference No.: 92001295
- Added to NRHP: October 2, 1992

The Former Fryeburg Town House is a historic municipal building in what is now a rural section of Fryeburg, Maine. Built in 1847, it served as Fryeburg's town hall for over 130 years, and is still used as a polling place. It was listed on the National Register of Historic Places in 1992.

== Description and history ==
The Town House is a single-story wood frame structure with a gable roof, resting on a granite foundation. The ridgeline of the roof is pierced by a corbelled brick chimney, and a small square ventilator with a hip roof. It is located on the east side of Maine State Route 5, just north of its junction with Corn Shop Road. The main facade, facing the street to the west, is three bays wide, with a center entrance flanked by sash windows. The gable end is fully enclosed, with narrow modillions both in the cornice and the gable rakes. The center of the tympanum has a small octagonal window, with a sign giving the building's construction date, 1847, above. A ramp on the south side of the building provides handicap access to the rear entrance, and there is a small projecting addition on the rear, which houses restroom facilities. The interior of the building is an open plan, with wide plank flooring and wainscoting on the walls, which are otherwise finished in original plaster.

Although the town of Fryeburg was settled in 1762 and incorporated in 1775, it remained an unfocused collection of rural properties for some time. Its earliest meeting houses were built in the geographic center of the town, near where this town house stands, but the area never developed as a significant economic center. The town appropriated $700 for the construction of the town house in 1847, and it was completed by an unknown builder later that year. The design, particularly of its braced roof framing, is reminiscent of that used in barns of the period, and the lath used in the plasterwork was created using an older technique. The building probably had only very modest Greek Revival styling when it was built; the modillions and the roof ventilator were probably added during renovations and alterations made in 1909.

The building was used as the town's principal meeting space from 1848 to 1983, and is still used as its polling place. Economic and civic activity in the town became focused in southern Fryeburg in the second half of the 19th century, leaving the Fryeburg Center area as a relatively rural area.

== See also ==
- National Register of Historic Places listings in Oxford County, Maine
