= Greenwood Cattle Pound =

- U.S. National Register of Historic Places
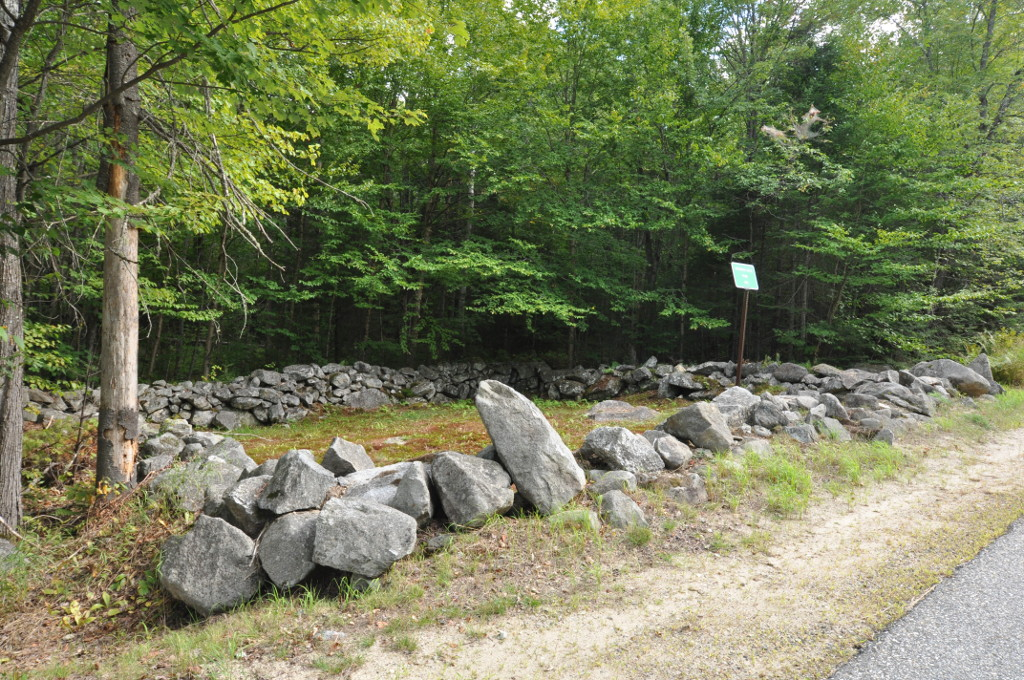

- Location within Maine Location within the United States
- Location: Greenwood Rd., 0.33 mi N of ME 219, Greenwood, Maine
- Coordinates: 44°19′21″N 70°39′18″W
- Area: 0.1 acres (0.040 ha)
- Built: 1836
- NRHP reference No.: 07000794
- Added to NRHP: August 7, 2007

The Greenwood Cattle Pound is an animal pound located on Greenwood Road, 0.3 miles (0.48 km) east of Maine State Route 219 in Greenwood, Maine. Completed in 1836, the roughly square stone structure is a reminder of the town's agrarian past. It was listed on the National Register of Historic Places in 2007.

== Description and history ==
The town of Greenwood was settled in the late 19th century and incorporated in 1816, roughly organized around three large land grants. It was an agricultural area, and like many of the period, the issue of stray livestock was a significant one. In 1835, the town voted to approve the construction of an animal pound "forty feet Square inside", with walls "five feet high with A Wooden Cap piece, [...] well hewed and well put on"; this structure was apparently complete the following year. The site selected was located just north of what was then the civic center of the town. Greenwood City, as that area was known, was almost completely destroyed by fire in 1862, and the economic and civic focus of the town shifted to Locke Mills, where textile mills and the railroad were located. The pound's importance declined after the invention of barbed wire made the fencing of pasturage economically feasible, and no pound masters are recorded after 1871. Greenwood's agrarian economy started to give way to recreational activities around the turn of the 20th century.

The pound as seen today consists of stone walls roughly in a square, set near the road and surrounded on the other three sides by woods. The northern and western walls are both 44 feet (13 m), while the eastern wall is 45 feet (14 m) and the southern one is 42 feet (13 m). The walls are constructed out of random fieldstone, mostly granite, and its interior walls were dressed. They were originally constructed to be 5 feet (1.5 m) wide at the base, tapering down to 2.5 feet (0.76 m) at a height of 5 feet. Slumping and collapse of some of the wall sections has lowered the wall height and increased its width. There are holes at intervals, indicating where posts were located to support the wooden cap. The entrance to the pound is at the south end of the west wall. There is no indication of a gate; a stone that probably served as a lintel over the opening rests against the wall nearby.

== See also ==
- National Register of Historic Places listings in Oxford County, Maine
