= Eastman Hill Rural Historic District =

Historic district in Maine, United States

- U.S. National Register of Historic Places
- U.S. Historic district
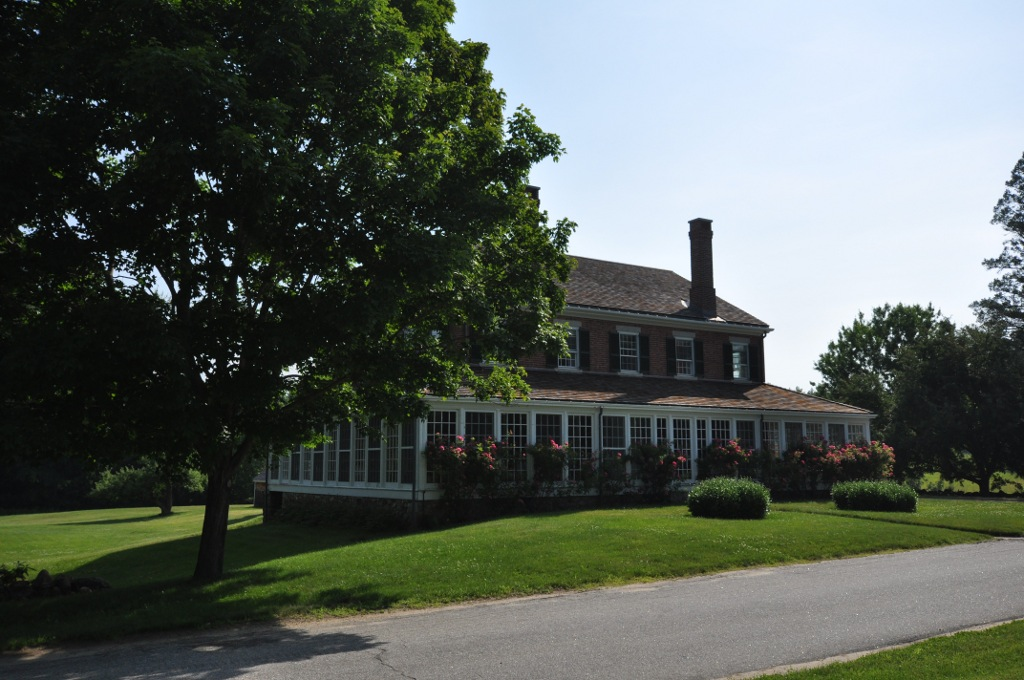
- Phineas Eastman House

- Location within Maine Location within the United States
- Nearest city: Center Lovell, Maine
- Coordinates: 44.16989°N 70.86813°W
- Area: 251 acres (102 ha)
- Built: 1830
- Architect: Fred Thorne
- Architectural style: Greek Revival, Federal
- NRHP reference No.: 93000477
- Added to NRHP: June 8, 1993

The Eastman Hill Rural Historic District is a historic district encompassing a rural landscape consisting of three 19th-century farmsteads near the village of Center Lovell, Maine. It covers 251 acres (102 ha) of the upper elevations of Eastman Hill, and is bisected by Eastman Hill Road. The area has been associated with the Eastman family since the early 19th century, and was one of the largest working farms in Lovell. Although the three properties were treated separately for some time, they were reunited in the early 20th century by Robert Eastman, a descendant of Phineas Eastman, the area's first settler. The district was listed on the National Register of Historic Places in 1993.

== Phineas Eastman House ==
The Phineas Eastman House is a connected farmstead, consisting of a main house built out of brick, a clapboarded wood-frame ell, and a shingled barn. The house is a 2 1/2-story structure that is located close to Eastman Hill Road, near the crest of the hill. Its gable roof is lined parallel to the road, and its front and side have a single-story sunporch which was added c. 1915, and which now obscures the Federal-style entrances to the house. The ell connecting the house to the barn appears to have been added about 1912. The barn is estimated to be mid-19th century, with later Colonial Revival and Tudor Revival alterations.

The main house was built by Phineas Eastman c. 1830, and was probably the second house he built on the land (purchased in 1816 and likely farmed soon thereafter). It was also very likely the first brick house in Lovell, an indication of Eastman's success.

== John Charles House ==
The John Charles House is located northwest of Eastman's house, and was also built c. 1830. Phineas Eastman sold land to John Charles, a nephew of his wife, in 1828. It is also a connected farmstead, with a 1 1/2-story Cape style wood-frame house, a 1 1/2-story connecting ell, and a barn. A veranda, again an early 20th century modification, wraps around two sides of the main block. Shed dormers, added about the same time, increase the second-floor space of the main house. Its interior woodwork appears to be a mix of original and Colonial Revival work. There are two outbuildings, an oat house and an orchard shed, both dating to c. 1850, on the property.

== Isaac Eastman House ==
This is a 2 1/2-story Greek Revival wood-frame house, built c. 1850 by Phineas Eastman's son. It has a typical side hall plan, two bays wide, with Doric pilasters at the corners and an entry framed by sidelight windows and pilasters, and topped by a transom window and scalloped frieze. An ell extends to the rear of the house, but does not connect to the barn, which dates to the same period as the house.

== See also ==
- National Register of Historic Places listings in Oxford County, Maine
