= First Universalist Society of West Sumner =

Historic church in Maine, United States

- U.S. National Register of Historic Places
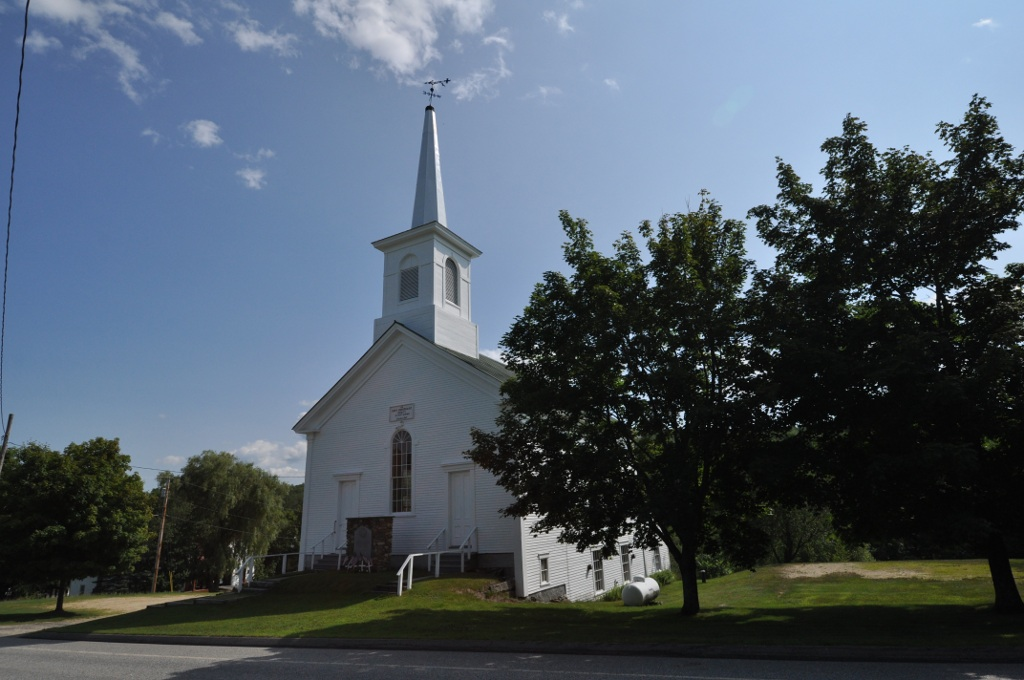

- Location within Maine Location within the United States
- Location: 1114 Main St., Sumner, Maine
- Coordinates: 44°21′58″N 70°27′40″W
- Area: 0.4 acres (0.16 ha)
- Built: 1867
- Architectural style: Greek Revival, Italianate
- NRHP reference No.: 02000850
- Added to NRHP: August 09, 2002

The First Universalist Society of West Sumner is a historic church at 1114 Main Street in Sumner, Maine. Built in 1867, this small Italianate church is one of the least-altered period churches of rural Maine. Notably, neither electricity nor modern heating have been added to the sanctuary, and the only major modification to the building was the 1913 addition of a kitchen space to the rear of its basement level. The building was listed on the National Register of Historic Places in 2002.

== Description and history ==
The Universalist Church in West Sumner is the second-oldest church building in the village, after the now-deconsecrated Baptist Church, which was built in 1858. It is a small 1 1/2-story wood-frame structure, built between June and October 1867. It rests on a granite foundation, and has a corrugated metal roof, which is topped by a squat square belfry with octagonal steeple. The main body of the church is clad in weatherboard, while the belfry section of the tower is flushboarded. The main facade, facing roughly northeast, has a pair of doorways symmetrically placed, with a tall round-arch window centered in between them at a raised level. The window arch has a keystone at the top, a motif repeated in the belfry, which also features round-arch louvered openings.

The church is set on a lot that slopes downhill from the road, exposing its full basement. Large windows on the main level illuminate the sanctuary, while smaller windows under some of those provide lighting into the basement space, which houses the vestry and meeting spaces. A small bumpout on the southeast side of the building houses a modern bathroom, and a shed-roof addition, built in 1913, extends the basement to the rear and houses a kitchen.

The main entrances provide access to vestibule areas, which are separated from the sanctuary by doors. The eastern vestibule has a hatch in the floor which provides access to the basement (which is otherwise only accessible from an outside doorway on the southeast side). The sanctuary is roughly square, with rows of bench pews divided by three aisles. At the northwest side of the sanctuary is a raised platform with a podium, settee, and chairs. Illumination is provided to the space by kerosene-fueled wall sconce fixtures, and by two ornate brass chandeliers with kerosene lamps covered by frosted globes. Heat is provided by a pair of wood stoves on the north side of the room.

In addition to the church building, a period horse shed also stands on the property, which appears to date to the period of the church building's construction. Located south of the main building, it has a saltbox shape, and is accessed by a single barn door in the northeast wall.

== See also ==
- National Register of Historic Places listings in Oxford County, Maine
