= Soldiers Memorial Library =

- U.S. National Register of Historic Places
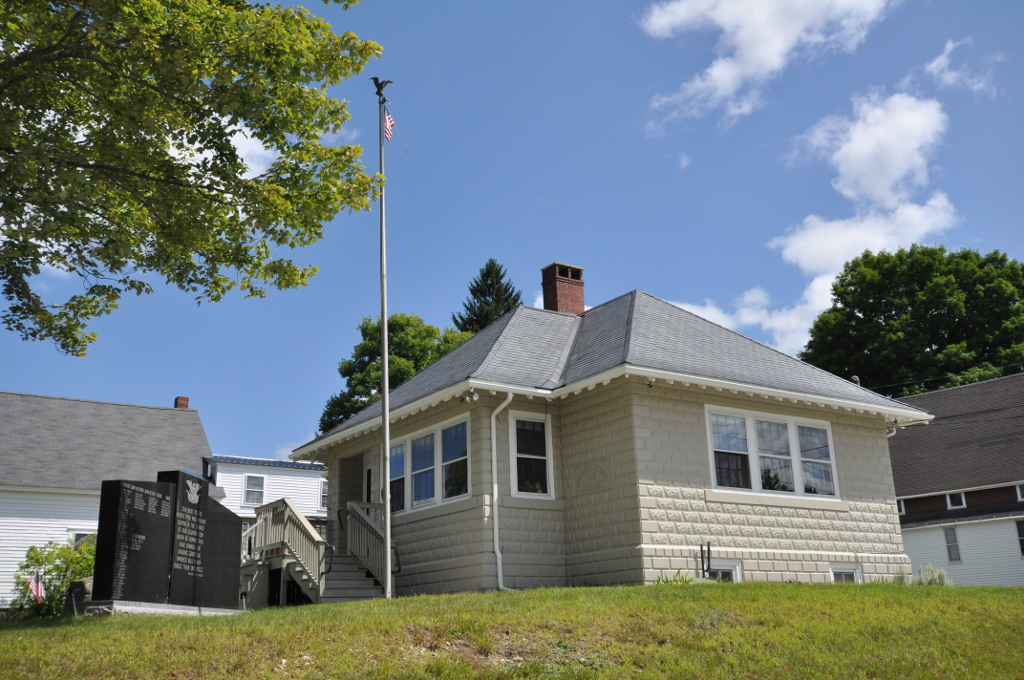

- Location within Maine Location within the United States
- Location: 85 Main St., Hiram, Maine
- Coordinates: 43°52′54″N 70°47′52″W
- Area: 0.2 acres (0.081 ha)
- Built: 1915
- Architect: Lawrence, Amos A.; Wambolt, Robert H.
- Architectural style: Bungalow/American craftsman
- MPS: Maine Public Libraries MPS
- NRHP reference No.: 08000992
- Added to NRHP: October 16, 2008

The Soldiers Memorial Library is the public library of Hiram, Maine. It is located at 85 Main Street in the center of the small town, in a small concrete-block building erected in 1915–16. It is architecturally significant as one only two library buildings in the state built using ornamental concrete blocks, and was for this reason listed on the National Register of Historic Places in 2008.

== Architecture ==
The library building was designed by Boston architects Robert Wambolt and Amos A. Lawrence, and is set on a small grassy lot with several small memorials to the community's soldiers in front. It is a small single-story structure, with a hip roof and a projecting hip-roof entry facing north. The walls are fashioned out of concrete blocks that are rusticated on the outside, except for corner quoins, basement courses, and a single belt-course just below the roof, which are smooth-faced. The entry section has two bays, the left one with the main entrance, which is slightly recessed, and the right one with a grouping of three sash windows. Window trios also appear on the side facades. The roof has typical Craftsman style, with extended eaves and exposed rafter tails.

The interior is divided into several small rooms. The circulation desk is immediately right of the entrance, with the main book collection in the southeast corner (later augmented by stacks added to the basement). Much of the remaining space is taken up by reading areas, one of which features a massive cobblestone fireplace. A plastered section of the chimney above the mantel has bronze plaques affixed, identifying all but one of the town's military service personnel who served in wars from the American Revolution to the Spanish–American War.

Construction of the library was made possible by a gift from Mrs. Virginia Gordon and other local residents, with the stipulation that it be in memory of the town's war participants. It is not known why or how Robert Wambolt was chosen as the principal architect; this library is his only known work in Maine.

== See also ==
- National Register of Historic Places listings in Oxford County, Maine
