= Elisha F. Stone House =

Historic house in Maine, United States

- U.S. National Register of Historic Places
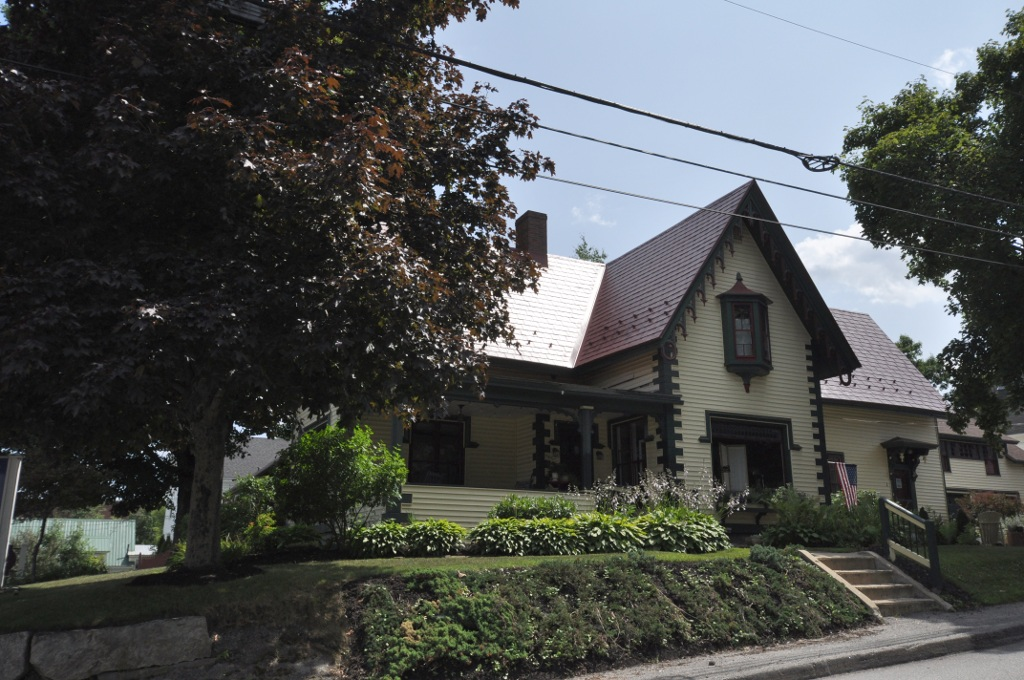

- Location within Maine Location within the United States
- Location: Gothic St., South Paris, Maine
- Coordinates: 44°13′29″N 70°30′54″W
- Area: 0.3 acres (0.12 ha)
- Built: 1854
- Architect: Henry Rowe
- Architectural style: Late Gothic Revival
- NRHP reference No.: 83000466
- Added to NRHP: April 28, 1983

The Elisha F. Stone House is a historic house at the corner of High and Gothic Streets in South Paris, Maine. Built in 1854, it is one of the finest Gothic Revival houses in Oxford County. The house was designed by Portland-based Henry Rowe, and built for Elisha F. Stone, a local merchant, tailor, and postmaster. It was listed on the National Register of Historic Places in 1983.

== Description and history ==
The Stone House is set on a rise overlooking both Gothic Street and the busy High Street. It is a 2 1/2-story T-shaped wood-frame structure, with a cross gable roof that has one wing of the T slightly longer than the other. The roof is steeply pitched, and all of the gables are decorated with icicle-shaped vergeboard. A porch, recently rebuilt, faithfully reproduces Gothic style woodwork, extending along the street-facing side of the T, to one of the wings. In the east-facing gable, an original first-floor oriel window has been replaced by a picture window, but it has been given a Gothic window surround matching those of other windows. The interior was extensively damaged by fire in the early 1980s, and has retained little original woodwork.

The Gothic Revival form is not commonly seen in rural Maine. Henry Rowe, an Irish immigrant based on Portland, was a specialist in the form, and designed a nearly identical house to this one Yarmouth, and another with similar styling in Portland. This house was built for Elisha Stone, who was a local merchant and tailor, and also served for a time as the local postmaster.

== See also ==
- National Register of Historic Places listings in Oxford County, Maine
