= Peabody Tavern =

- U.S. National Register of Historic Places
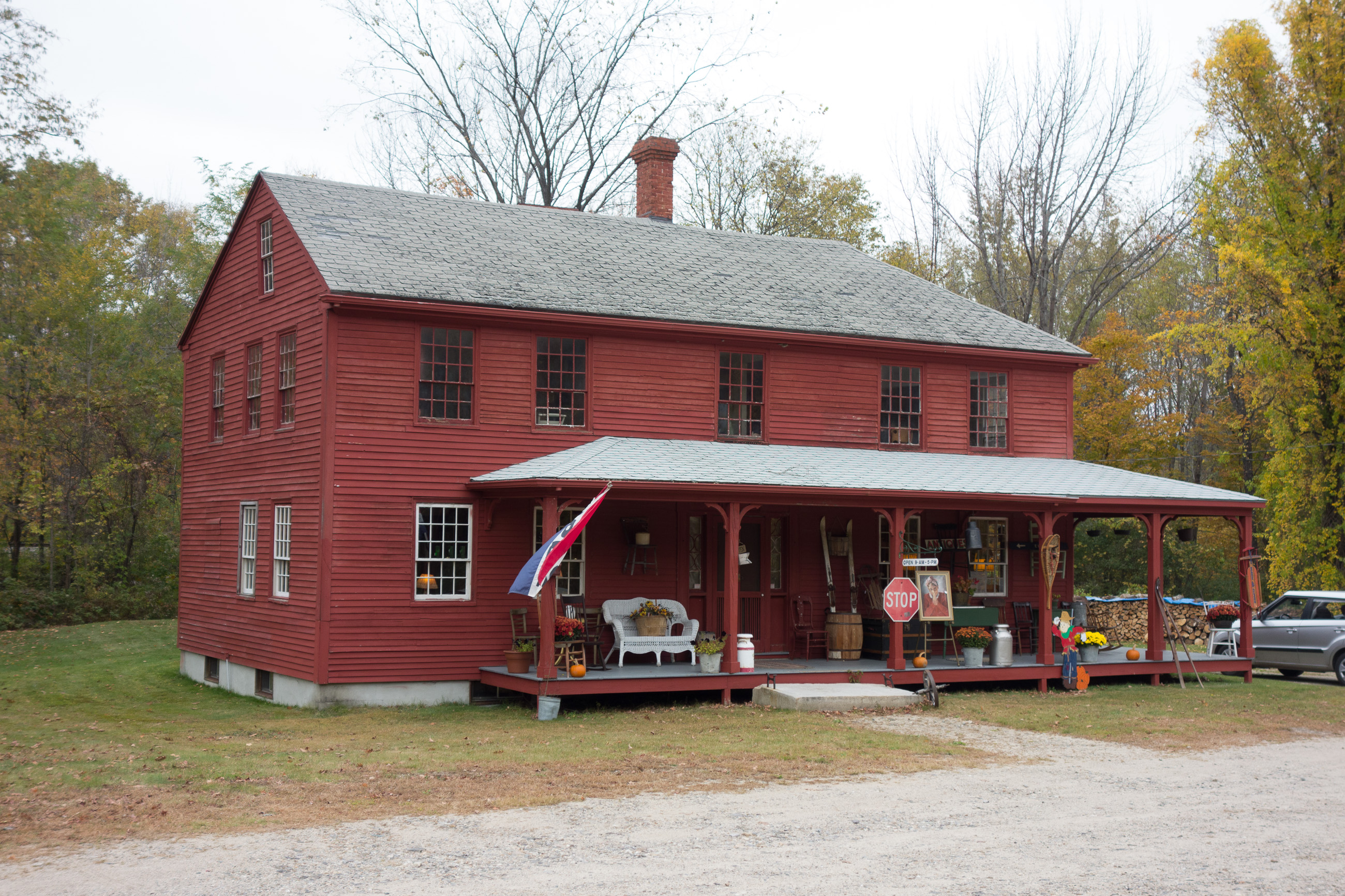
- Peabody Tavern in 2013

- Location within Maine Location within the United States
- Nearest city: Gilead, Maine
- Coordinates: 44°23′55″N 70°56′7″W
- Area: 1 acre (0.40 ha)
- Built: 1800
- Built by: Thomas Peabody
- NRHP reference No.: 76000107
- Added to NRHP: December 13, 1976

The Peabody Tavern is a historic traveler's accommodations on United States Route 2 in Gilead, Maine. Built c. 1800 by Thomas Peabody, nephew to one of the area's first white settlers, it served travelers as a stagecoach, and later railroad, stop until the early 20th century. It was listed on the National Register of Historic Places in 1976.

== Description and history ==
The tavern is a 2-1/2 story L-shaped wood frame structure, five bays wide, with an asymmetrically pitched gable roof. A massive brick foundation in the basement gives evidence that the tavern once had a large central chimney, but this has been removed and replaced by small chimneys elsewhere. A hip roofed single-story porch spans most of the front facade, and wraps around to the right side. Windows are replacement sash throughout. The main entrance, sheltered by the porch, has Federal style sidelight windows and woodwork. The interior retains a number of original period features, although the main chimney and associated fireplaces have been removed. Two of the rooms in the house have early period stencilwork on the walls, and many rooms still have wide plank flooring.

The tavern was built by Thomas Peabody, whose uncle Oliver was one of the first white settlers in the Gilead area. His father, Thomas, was a veteran of the French and Indian War, and was granted the land on which the tavern stands for his service. The property includes a small cemetery in which a number of Peabodys are interred. The structure has had many owners over the years. At one point it had a fairly large two-story ell, which was removed to make way for the railroad right-of-way which now passes between the building and the Androscoggin River; only traces of its foundation remain. In 2010 it was listed as housing an antique dealer.

== See also ==
- National Register of Historic Places listings in Oxford County, Maine
