= McLaughlin House and Garden =

Historic house in Maine, United States

- U.S. National Register of Historic Places
- U.S. Historic district
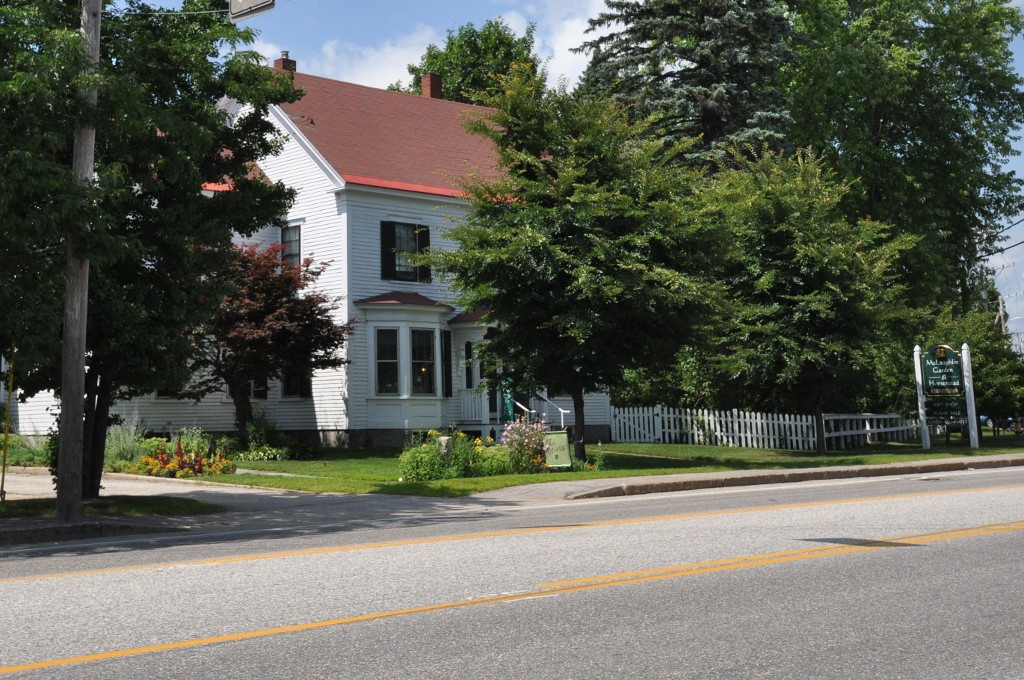

- Location within Maine Location within the United States
- Location: 97 Main St., South Paris, Maine
- Coordinates: 44°13′8″N 70°31′3″W
- Area: 3.5 acres (1.4 ha)
- Built: 1851
- Architect: Bernard McLaughlin
- Architectural style: Greek Revival, Italianate
- NRHP reference No.: 00001202
- Added to NRHP: October 27, 2000

The McLaughlin House and Garden are a historic house museum and associated specimen garden at 97 Main Street in South Paris, Maine. The property includes a traditional New England connected farmstead with house, ell, and barn, all of which date to the mid-19th century, and a landscaped garden area developed beginning in the 1930s by Bernard McLaughlin that now houses more than 500 varieties of flowers. It is one of a small number of such specimen gardens in the state, and was listed on the National Register of Historic Places in 2000. The property is now owned by a local nonprofit organization, and is open to the public free of charge between May and October.

== Description and history ==
The McLaughlin House is a 2 1/2-story wood-frame structure, three bays wide, which is set close to busy Main Street in South Paris. The main entrance is in the center bay, flanked by sidelight windows and topped by a fanlight, with a sheltering hood supported by heavy Italianate brackets. The bay to the left of the entry has a projecting polygonal bay. A two-story wing is recessed from the main block, and joins the house via a connecting ell to a period barn. The wing and ell have an enclosed porch extending along the south facade. The interior of the main block has woodwork that is transitional Greek Revival/Italianate in style.

The house is believed to have been built c. 1851 by John Holmes, who purchased the land in that year, and sold it at a markedly higher price the following year. It remained in the hands of members of the Holmes and Bicknell families until 1890, when it was acquired by Frederick Tribou. Tribou's daughter Rena married Bernard McLaughlin in 1936, and the couple lived there until their deaths (hers in 1986, his in 1995). The Tribous and McLaughlins did not farm the land, instead selling most of it off over time for development. Bernard McLaughlin was an amateur horticulturalist, and he used tracts of the former agricultural lands of the property to build a landscaped specimen garden over a period of six decades. A 1994 survey of the property identified more than 500 different species of plants, predominantly irises and lilacs, although other annual and perennial flowers and woodland plants are also represented in the collection. Although McLaughlin was an amateur, this collection has come to have some importance in Maine as one of only three such gardens statewide.

Although McLaughlin's will stipulated that the property be sold off, local preservationists banded together to preserve the property. The property is open to the public free of charge between May and October; guided tours are available for a fee, and its facilities are available for rental.

== See also ==
- National Register of Historic Places listings in Oxford County, Maine
