= J&O Irish Store =

- J. & O. Irish Store
- U.S. National Register of Historic Places
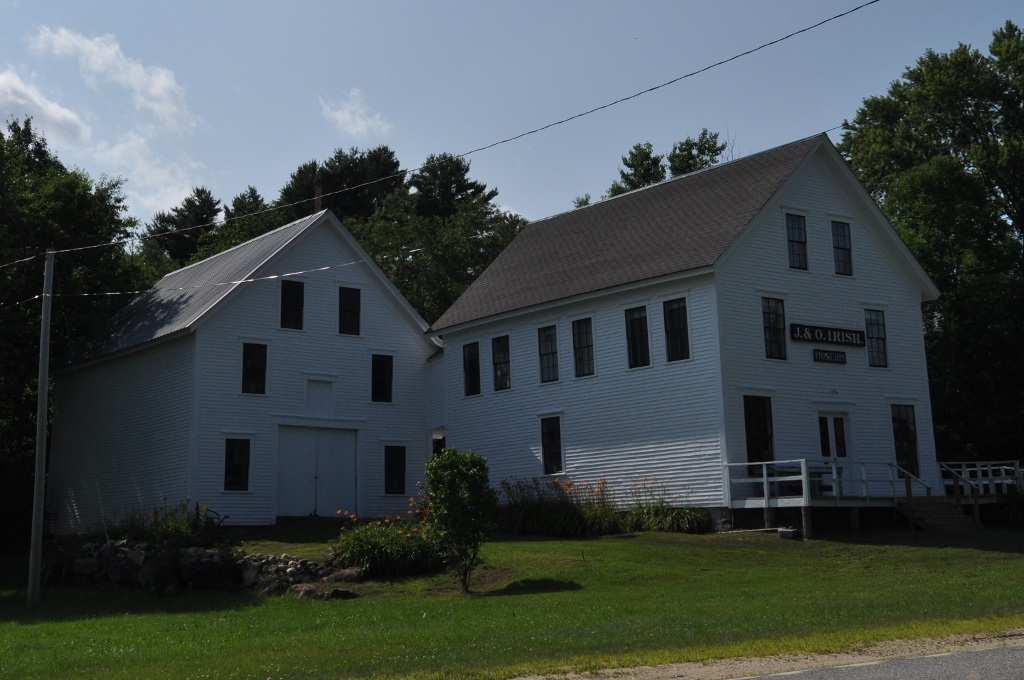

- Location within Maine Location within the United States
- Location: ME 140, Hartford, Maine
- Coordinates: 44°22′22″N 70°20′52″W
- Area: 0.5 acres (0.20 ha)
- Built: 1887
- Built by: Orlando Irish
- NRHP reference No.: 83003666
- Added to NRHP: December 29, 1983

The J. & O. Irish Store is a historic retail building, now used as a museum, on Maine State Route 140 in Hartford, Maine. Built in 1888 by Orlando Irish, it is virtually unaltered since that time, representing a time capsule of the period in rural Maine. The building was listed on the National Register of Historic Places in 1983.

== Description and history ==
The Irish Store is a 2-1/2 story wood frame structure with a gable roof, which is attached to a similar barn. The main facade of the store has its entrance centered on the main facade, flanked on each side by a single sash window. The second level also has two windows, stepped in from those on the first level, with a sign reading "J&O Store" in between. There are also two windows in the gable. The windows and door all have simple molded surrounds. The barn features a similar array of fenestration, with a wide two-leaf barn door that has an opening for a hay loft above.

The interior of the store building has the retail space on the first floor and a residential space above. Both spaces feature original wood flooring and simple trim lacking ornamentation. The store fixtures include wooden counters and shelves, a desk for sorting mail, and a wooden ice box.

The store was built by Orlando Irish, a prosperous local farmer, in 1887–88. The store was operated by members of the Irish family, and was given to the Hartford Historical Society by James Irish in 1976. The Society operates the property as a museum and storage facility for its collections.

== See also ==
- National Register of Historic Places listings in Oxford County, Maine
