= McWain-Hall House =

Historic house in Maine, United States

- U.S. National Register of Historic Places
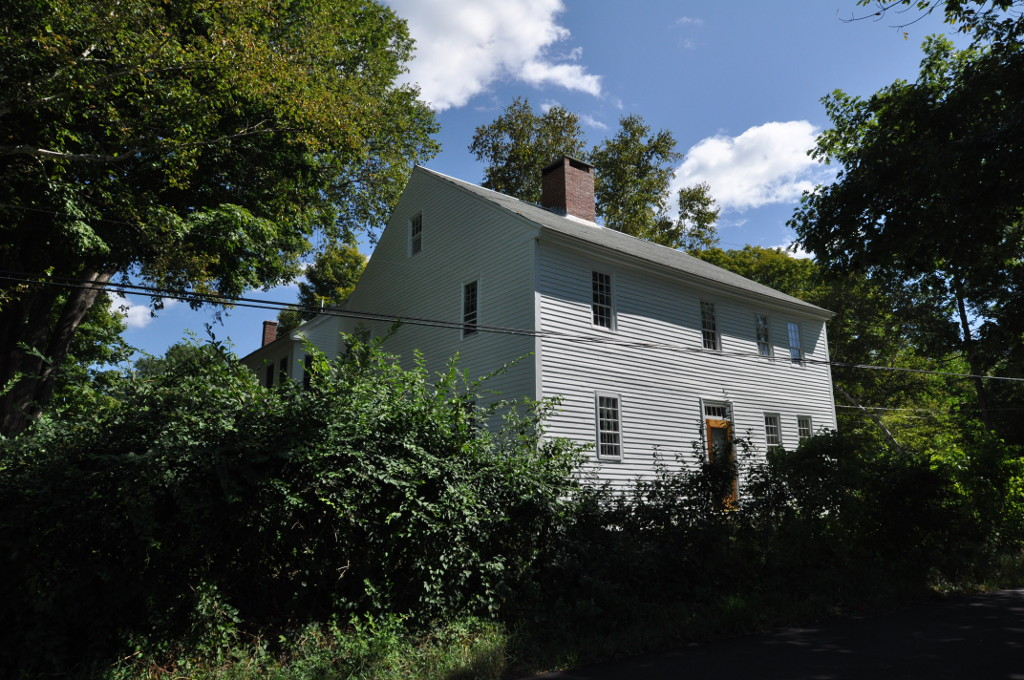

- Location within Maine Location within the United States
- Nearest city: Waterford, Maine
- Coordinates: 44°11′14″N 70°40′10″W
- Area: 1 acre (0.40 ha)
- Built: 1800
- Architectural style: Federal
- NRHP reference No.: 87000416
- Added to NRHP: March 25, 1987

The McWain-Hall House is a historic house on McWain Hill Road in Waterford, Maine. It is a typical vernacular Federal-style farmhouse, which is not only one of the oldest houses in the area, but is also locally significant as the home of David McWain (1752-1825), one of the town's first settlers. It was listed on the National Register of Historic Places in 1987

== Description ==
The house is a large 2 1/2-story wood-frame structure, whose main block is four bays wide and two rooms deep, with a large central chimney. The bays on the front facade are irregularly spaced: the main entrance is centered, with two sash windows on the south (right) side and one on the north, while the second level has four windows spaced above the first floor door and windows. A two-story ell extends to the rear of the main block which is said to be a late 19th-century replacement for an earlier ell. A shed-roof porch supported by square posts runs along the south facade of the ell. The ell is further connected to a barn whose construction suggests significant age.

The interior of the main block begins with a small vestibule area which has a narrow stair rising to the second floor. The main hall is to the right and the parlor to the left. The original kitchen occupies a space behind the central chimney, with smaller pantry rooms on either side. Decoration in the front rooms includes relatively modest vernacular paneling. The upstairs presently has three rooms, two in front and a single large one in the back, although there is evidence that the room configuration has changed over the years.

== History ==
The town of Waterford was surveyed in 1774 and incorporated in 1797. David McWain, a native of Bolton, Massachusetts, is said to have arrived in the area in 1775, having purchased a parcel of land. He established a permanent residence in 1777, and bought this property in 1796. He farmed the land, owned a dairy herd, and raised pigs. A bachelor, he willed the land to his nephew David, who took over the land in 1825. His heirs sold the property in 1874 to Soloman Hall, in whose family it remained until 1928.

== See also ==
- National Register of Historic Places listings in Oxford County, Maine
