= Marion Parsons House =

Historic house in Maine, United States

- U.S. National Register of Historic Places
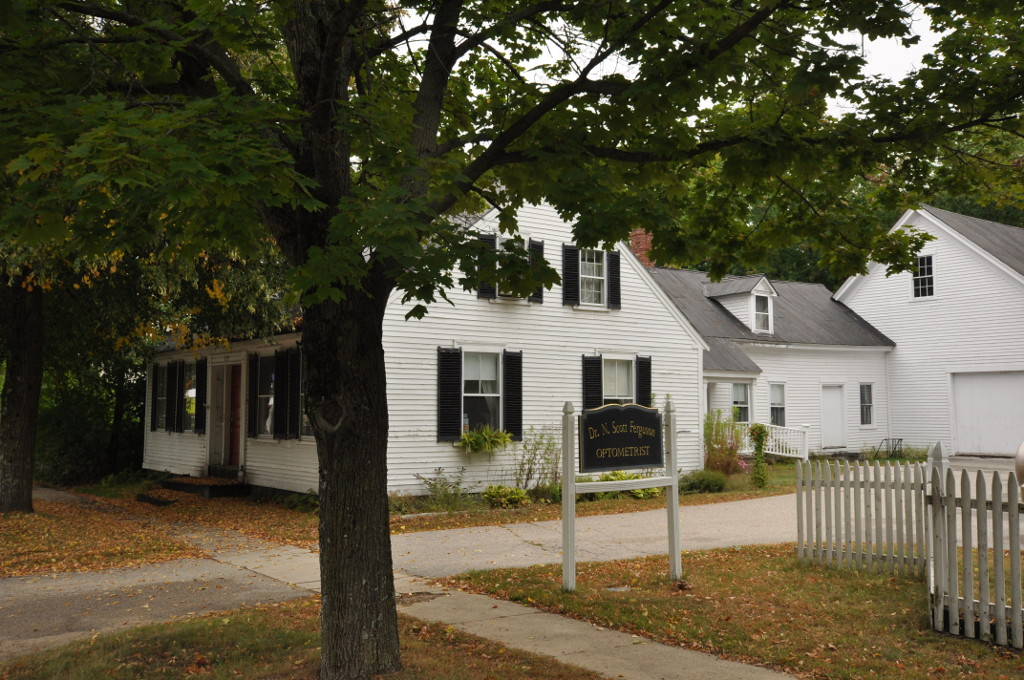

- Location within Maine Location within the United States
- Location: 179 Main St., Fryeburg, Maine
- Coordinates: 44°0′51″N 70°59′1″W
- Area: 0.3 acres (0.12 ha)
- Built: 1940
- NRHP reference No.: 86002432
- Added to NRHP: January 23, 1987

The Marion Parsons House is a historic house at 179 Main Street in Fryeburg, Maine. It is located on the southeast side of Main Street, opposite River Street and two doors west of Elm Street. The main block of the house, built c. 1838 by a tailor named Robert Tonge, is a modest 1 1/2-story Cape style wood-frame structure with a gable roof. The exterior is finished in clapboards, with chimneys at either end. It is five bays wide, with a recessed center entry that is framed by sidelights and a molded architrave. A 1 1/2-story ell, an 1870s replacement for an earlier one, extends to the rear of the main block. This ell is attached to a 1 1/2-story barn which has Greek Revival styling.

The house is most significant for its association with Marion Parsons (1876-1968), a pioneering nurse and nursing educator active in the early 20th century. Miss Parsons had a distinguished career, first as a nurse in hospitals in Boston and San Francisco, and was for two years a nursing instructor at New York City Hospital. During World War I she volunteered her services to the military, serving several tours of duty at military medical facilities in France. In 1919 she was dispatched by the American Red Cross to Czechoslovakia, where she established a nurse's training school. She is one of a small number of women to receive the Czech Order of the White Lion. She was also decorated with the British Royal Red Cross for her World War I service. She returned to a teaching position in Boston, and retired in 1940 to this house, which she had purchased in 1937; it was her only permanent home.

The house was listed on the National Register of Historic Places in 1987.

== See also ==
- National Register of Historic Places listings in Oxford County, Maine
