= Maine Archaeological Survey site 21.26 =

- U.S. National Register of Historic Places
- Nearest city: Lovell, Maine
- Area: 2 acres (0.81 ha)
- MPS: Native American Petroglyphs and Pictographs of Maine MPS
- NRHP reference No.: 97000915
- Added to NRHP: September 5, 1997

Maine Archaeological Survey site 21.26 is a Native American rock art site in Lovell, Maine. The site is on a rock formation that overlooks a lake in an area known to be frequented in historical times by bands of Abenaki. It has depictions of human figures, including two stick-like figures with raised arms, as well as a third image that has apparently been partially destroyed. These images were creating by pecking or dinting, probably with a stone tool. The artwork also included the use red ochre, and was generally overlaid by carbonaceous material dated by radiocarbon dating methods to about 1,000 BCE. The site was visited by state archaeologists in 1991, who mapped, photographed, and took surface plaster prints of the images.

The images found at the site are stylistically consistent with others found further north, on the Canadian Shield, and are not obviously related stylistically to petroglyphs found elsewhere in Maine. They are among a small number of examples in Maine of what are believed to be non-mortuary shamanistic practices. Variations in the artwork that have survived the weathering process suggest that sites like this were repeatedly visited, possibly by different individuals, over unknown periods of time. The site was listed on the National Register of Historic Places in 1997.

== See also ==
- National Register of Historic Places listings in Oxford County, Maine
