= Hubbard–Cotton Store =

- U.S. National Register of Historic Places
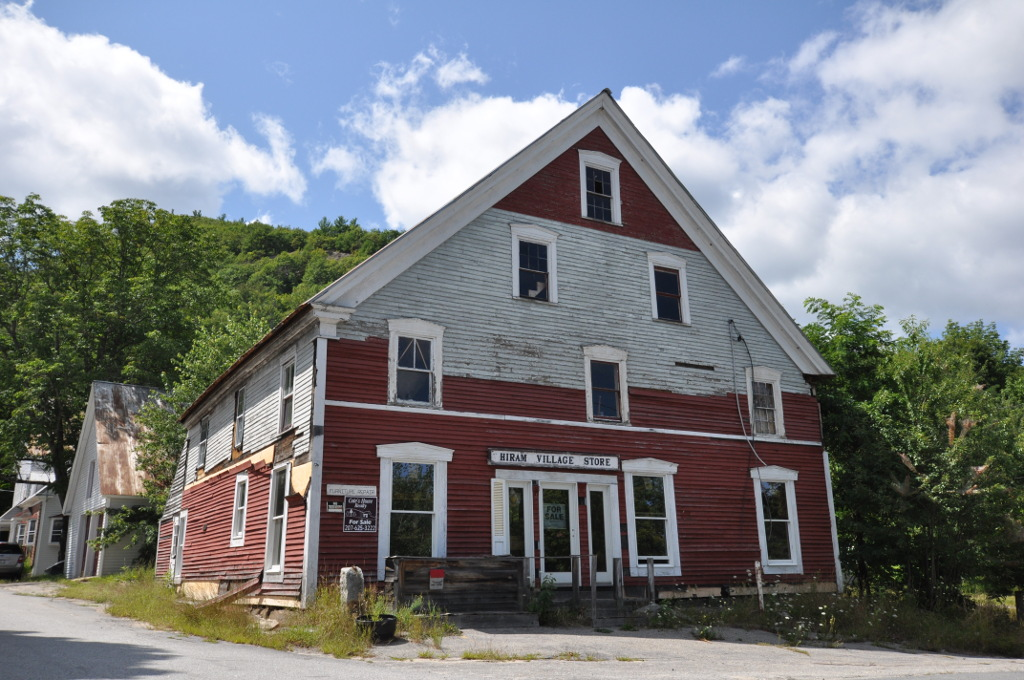
- The partially restored building in 2014

- Location within Maine Location within the United States
- Location: SR 5/113 across Saco R. from jct. with SR 117, Hiram, Maine
- Coordinates: 43°52′28″N 70°48′19″W
- Area: less than one acre
- Built: 1850
- Architectural style: Greek Revival, Italianate
- NRHP reference No.: 90000923
- Added to NRHP: June 14, 1990

The Hubbard–Cotton Store is a historic commercial building on the corner of River Rd and Mountain View Ave, near its junction with 113 in the center of Hiram, Maine. Built c. 1850, it is locally notable as one of the only non-residential historic structures in the small town, and was operated for about 100 years by the Cotton family. It was listed on the National Register of Historic Places in 1990.

== Description and history ==
The store is a 2 1/2-story wood-frame structure with a front-gable roof, which is clad in wooden clapboards and rests on a granite foundation. The main facade, roughly facing east, has an asymmetrical four-bay first level, with the main entrance in the bay left of center. The other bays on that level are occupied by sash windows with shallow triangular pediments. The second level has three evenly spaced windows, and within the gable there are two more levels, having two and one window respectively. A series of three additions, two of which appear to be 19th-century, extend the building to the rear.

The interior of the store has retained a significant number of original features, including exposed beams in the first-level store area.

The site of the store is known to have been used for commercial purposes since at least 1816. The property was acquired by John Hubbard in 1842, and the building's Greek Revival form suggests it was built by him, although it may have older elements. The Hubbard family operated the store until 1886, when it was sold to Lemuel Cotton. Members of the Cotton family ran the store until 1987. It was rescued from condemnation and demolition by a new owner in 2005, who began restoration of the property. That owner died before the restoration was completed.

== See also ==
- National Register of Historic Places listings in Oxford County, Maine
