= Levi Sargent House =

Historic house in Maine, United States

- U.S. National Register of Historic Places
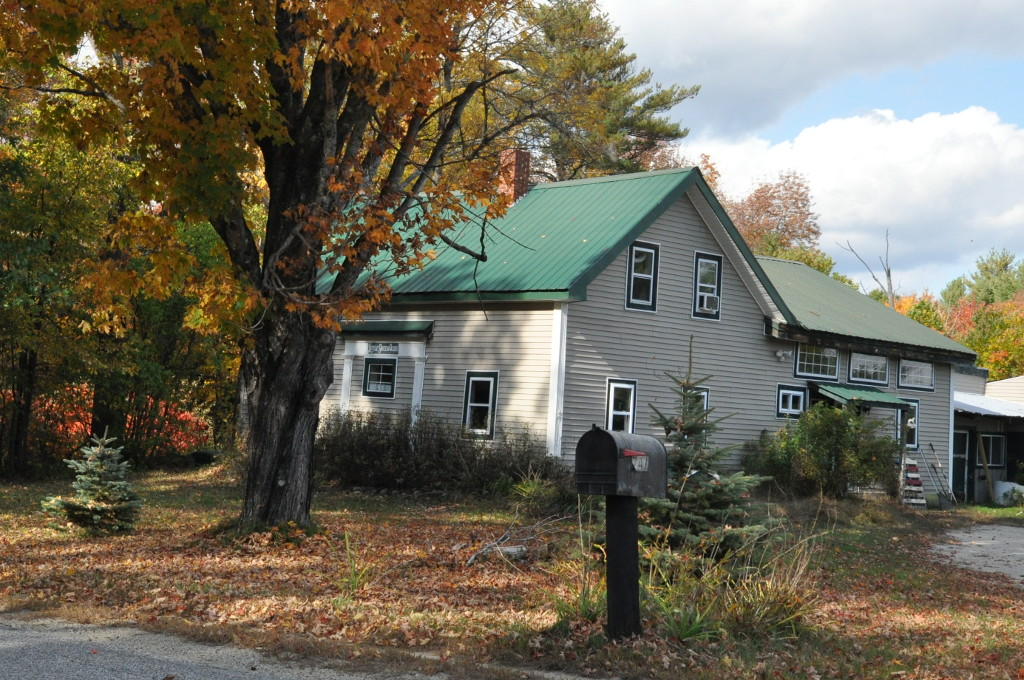

- Location within Maine Location within the United States
- Location: 747 Otisfield Gore Road, Otisfield, Maine
- Coordinates: 44°8′58″N 70°33′50″W
- Area: 1 acre (0.40 ha)
- Built: c. 1812
- Architect: Sargent, Levi
- Architectural style: Unknown
- NRHP reference No.: 87000419
- Added to NRHP: March 13, 1987

The Levi Sargent House is a historic house at 747 Otisfield Gore Road in Otisfield, Maine. Built c. 1812, It is one of a small number of log structures to survive in Maine from the 19th century. It was listed on the National Register of Historic Places in 1987.

== Description and history ==
The Sargent house consists of a 1 1/2-story main block, three bays wide, with a long ell. The main block is oriented to the southwest, with its centered entry framed by sidelight windows and pilasters, and topped by a simple entablature. The flanking windows are replacement sash windows, as are those on the other elevations. The house is finished in clapboards, completely obscuring the log structure. The logs are roughly hewn, with limestone mortar filling the gaps. In places where the log beams are too short, two logs were simply butted together. The corners are formed by the use of square corner notches. The logs show evidence of having been covered in sheathing from an early period.

The house's ell has more traditional frame construction, and was probably built during the Greek Revival period, around the same time the front door surround was added. Its interior consists of three rooms. The interior of the main block has a central hall with large chambers on either side. The western chamber has a narrow staircase leading upstairs, where there are four small chambers accessed off a narrow hallway.

The house is thought to have been built by Levi Sargent (1786-1861), a Methodist minister who moved to the area in the 1790s and married in 1811. That same year he purchased the land on which this house sits (then 109 acres (44 ha)).

== See also ==
- National Register of Historic Places listings in Oxford County, Maine
