= Fryeburg Registry of Deeds =

- U.S. National Register of Historic Places
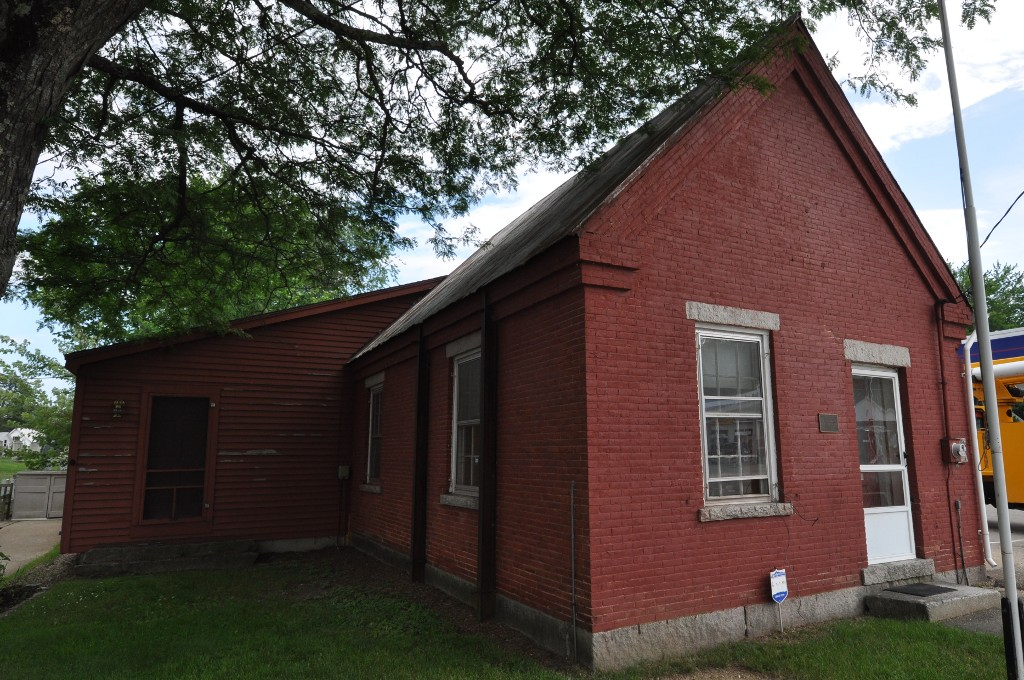

- Location within Maine Location within the United States
- Location: 96 Main St., Fryeburg, Maine
- Coordinates: 44°0′53″N 70°58′59″W
- Area: less than one acre
- Built: 1845
- Architectural style: Greek Revival
- NRHP reference No.: 87002196
- Added to NRHP: December 30, 1987

The Fryeburg Registry of Deeds is a historic former government building on Main Street in Fryeburg, Maine. Built in the early 18th century, it was the only building of the Oxford County government in the western part of the county, and a rare regional example of Greek Revival styling executed in brick. It was listed on the National Register of Historic Places in 1987.

== Description and history ==
The registry is a small brick single-story structure, two bays wide, resting on a granite foundation. It has a gable roof, with a simple corbelled cornice giving it a Greek Revival flavor. The windows have granite sills and lintels, as does the main entrance, which is in the right bay of the facade. The eastern (right) facade has two sash windows, while the western side has only one. A frame addition, added in 1975, extends along the rear of the building, projecting on the west side. The exterior walls have been reinforced with steel, and a brick flue rises from the building's metal roof. The building's interior has modern finish, and there is a large vault inside.

The town of Fryeburg was established in 1762 by Joseph Frye and several other proprietors, and was the first non-Native community in what is now Oxford County. In 1800 Fryeburg was chosen by York County as the place for a registry of deeds covering the northern part of the county. Oxford County was separated from York County and Cumberland County in 1805, with its seat at Paris Hill. The county opted to continue maintaining a registry in Fryeburg, and in 1821 ordered the construction of a fireproof registry building, which was completed the following year. The present building, if it was built at this time, is stylistically anomalous, as the Greek Revival period did not begin until later in the 1820s. However, no documentary evidence exists for a replacement in the county records. The building is stylistically similar to a small number of regional buildings built between 1840 and 1850. This building housed the registry until 1918, and was used thereafter for town offices and the local historical society museum. It is presently (2014) vacant.

== See also ==
- National Register of Historic Places listings in Oxford County, Maine
