= West Paris Lodge No. 15, I.O.O.F. =

- U.S. National Register of Historic Places
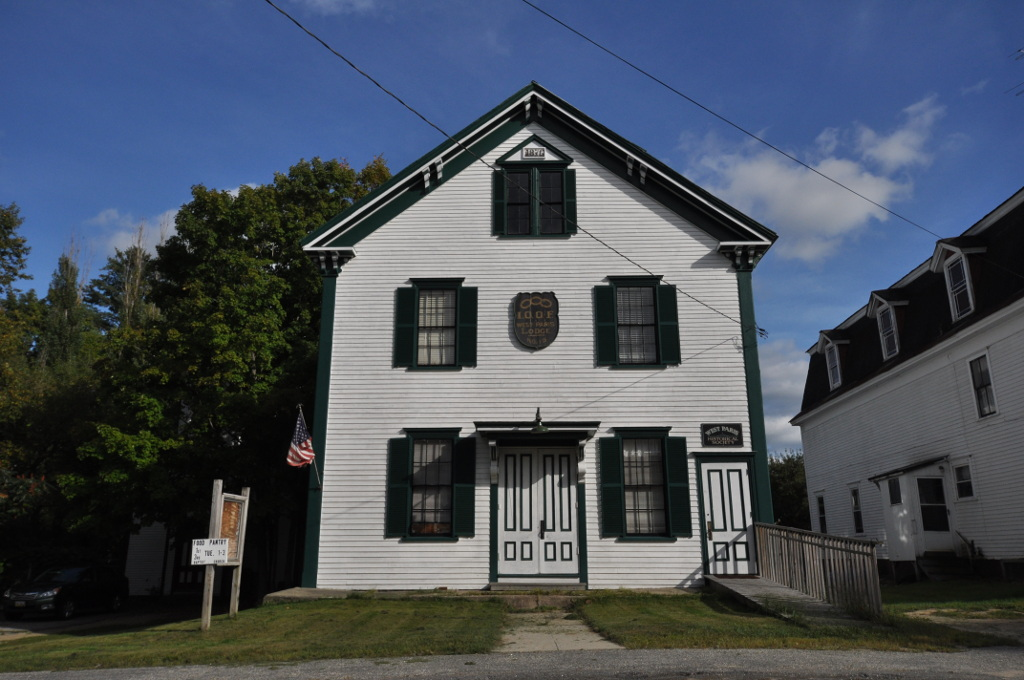

- Location within Maine Location within the United States
- Location: 221 Main Street, West Paris, Maine
- Coordinates: 44°19′33″N 70°34′21″W
- Area: less than one acre
- Built: 1876-80
- Architectural style: Italianate
- NRHP reference No.: 11001058
- Added to NRHP: January 27, 2012

The West Paris Lodge No. 15, I.O.O.F. is a historic fraternal clubhouse at 221 Main Street in West Paris, Maine. It was built during 1876-80 by the local chapter of the International Order of Odd Fellows (IOOF), and served as the meeting place for the fraternal organization into the 1980s. It is also a significant meeting space for social events in the wider community. The building, now owned by the local historical society, was listed on the National Register of Historic Places in 2012.

== Description and history ==
The West Paris IOOF Lodge hall is a two-story wood frame structure, with a gable roof, clapboard siding, and a foundation that is partly granite and partly brick. A shed-roof addition extends to the rear of the building. The building has vernacular Italianate styling, with paired scroll brackets in the eaves and along the rake and gable edge, and pilasters at the corners. The main facade, facing northwest, has two windows, symmetrically placed on each of the two main levels, and a fifth window in the gable; the latter is topped by a triangular moulding in which a panel contains a plaque inscribed "1876". Between the windows on the first level is the main entrance, a double door sheltered by a hood supported by scrolled brackets. A second, more modest entrance, is sandwiched between the rightmost window and the building corner; this entry provides access to the lodge facilities on the second floor.

The first floor interior houses a vestibule area, and then a kitchen, with a large hall serving as a dining area that also has a stage. A stairway area off the vestibule serves to provide access to both the basement and the upper level, which is also accessible via the outside door. The stairs from each lead to a landing, from which a door with a peephole provides access to a vestibule flanked by storage areas. This configuration was arranged to limit entry to the upper level lodge facilities to authorized individuals. This area includes trappings of the IOOF, including portraits of its leaders as well as ceremonial regalia. The lodge auditorium, which takes up most of the floor, has been converted into a museum exhibit space by the historical society.

The hall was built c. 1880 by Silas Maxim, a local builder, and is one of West Paris' largest civic buildings. It was originally built to house facilities for both the local chapter of the International Order of Odd Fellows (IOOF), and of the local Masonic chapter. The Masons built their own hall next door to this building in 1893. This building was enlarged in length by about 15 feet (4.6 m) in 1889, visible in part by the use of brick for the foundation of the addition. This addition included the stage, and made possible the staging of theatrical and musical events in the hall. The building was sold to the West Paris Historical Society in 1986, which uses the hall as an office space and museum.

== See also ==
- National Register of Historic Places listings in Oxford County, Maine
