= Lower Meeting House and East Bethel Cemetery =

Historic site in Oxford County, Maine, US

- U.S. National Register of Historic Places
- U.S. Historic district
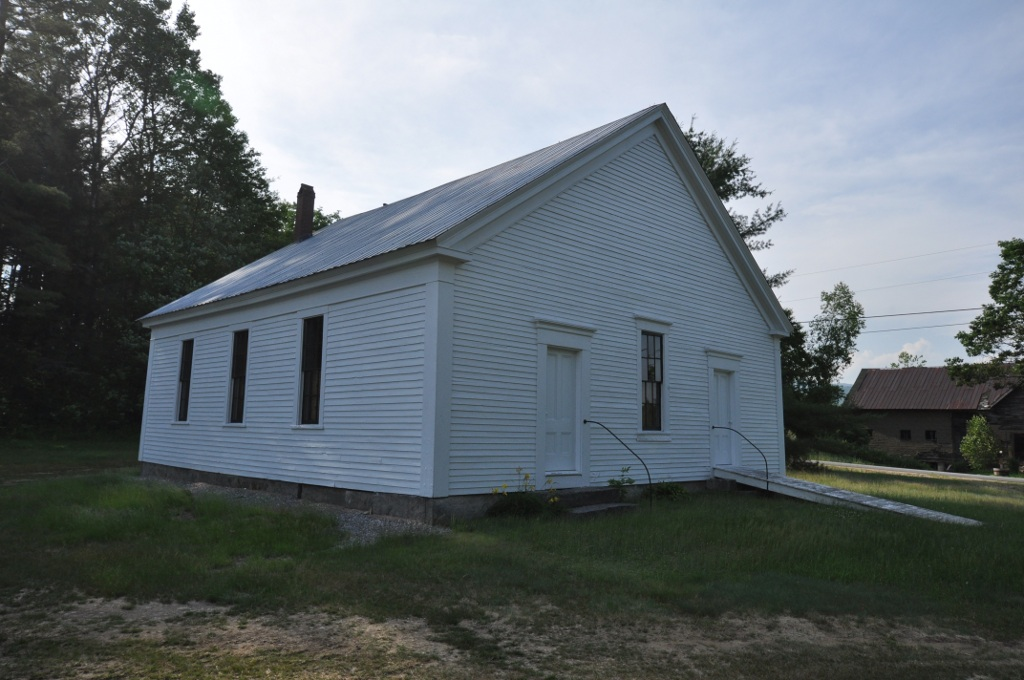

- Location within Maine Location within the United States
- Nearest city: Bethel, Maine
- Coordinates: 44°27′53″N 70°43′17″W
- Area: 2 acres (0.81 ha)
- Built: 1831
- Architectural style: Federal
- NRHP reference No.: 13000440
- Added to NRHP: June 25, 2013

The Lower Meeting House and East Bethel Cemetery are a historic religious property at 1797 Intervale Road in Bethel, Maine. The meeting house, built in 1831 and only modestly modified since, is a good local example of a typical rural church of the period in Maine; the cemetery has been in use for a longer period, with its oldest dated burial occurring in 1817. The property was listed on the National Register of Historic Places in 2013.

== Church ==
The church building is a single-story wood frame structure resting on a granite foundation. It is finished in wooden clapboards and a metal roof, with a pair of brick chimneys rising from its west end. Its main facade has two doors flanking a central sash window. Each doorway has modest Federal styling, with a molded entablature and a large frieze. The sides of the building have three sash windows, and the rear has a single window between the two chimneys.

The doorways lead into separate vestibules, each with a closet, which then lead into the main sanctuary. The walls are plaster over lath, with wainscoting in the sanctuary. The sanctuary has rows of pews, a pedestal pulpit ornamented with wood paneling, and a two pump organs in the rear, behind which area a raised platform area traditionally used as a choir loft.

The church was built in 1831 as a "union church", serving the East Bethel community's Baptist and Methodist congregations. Because the church's records were destroyed in 1891, its alteration history is not fully known. Architectural evidence indicates that the side walls once had additional windows, and that the wall partitioning the vestibules from the sanctuary has been moved.

== Cemetery ==
The East Bethel Cemetery is located just south of the church, and continues to be actively used. It is a roughly rectangular plot, laid out parallel to a former roadway that originally passed in front of the church. The northernmost portion of the cemetery is its oldest section, and is set off from the churchyard by a fence of wrought iron, pipe, and wire. This historic section is laid out in five rows of 22 plots. Burials include Lou Ann Gleason, the first burial, in 1817, and Deacon Asa Kimball, Jr. in 1823, who founded the Baptist congregation in Bethel. There is also a section of the cemetery which was historically dedicated to the burial of the town's poor, which is presumed to contain unmarked graves.

== See also ==
- National Register of Historic Places listings in Oxford County, Maine
