= Lower Sunday River School =

- U.S. National Register of Historic Places
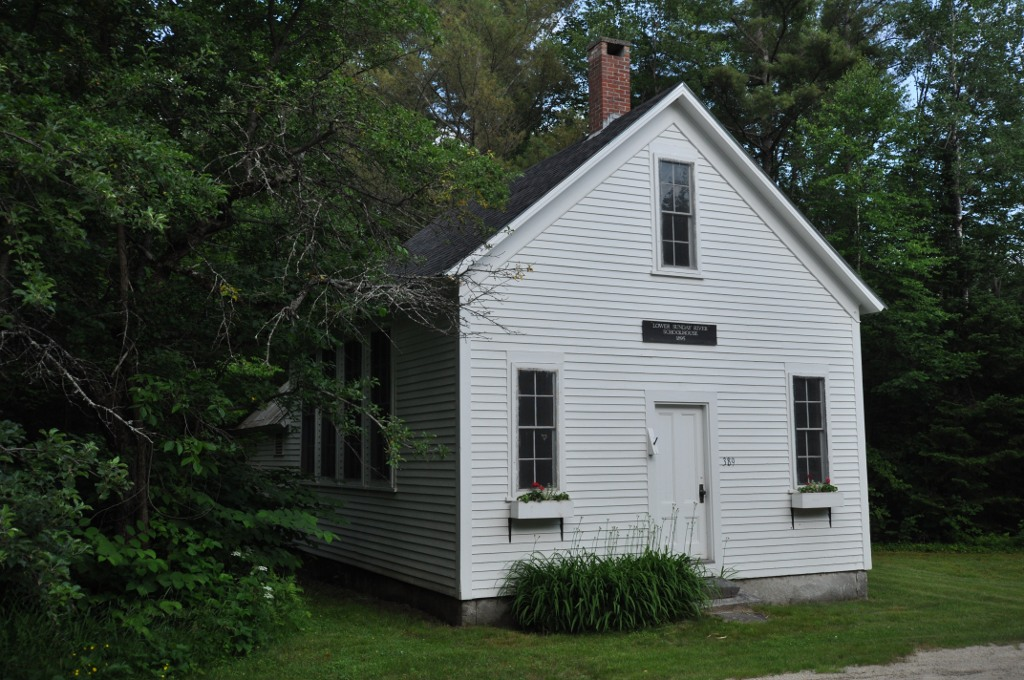

- Location within Maine Location within the United States
- Nearest city: Sunday River Road, Newry, Maine
- Coordinates: 44°28′21″N 70°49′56″W
- Area: 0.5 acres (0.20 ha)
- Built: 1895
- NRHP reference No.: 78000189
- Added to NRHP: May 23, 1978

The Lower Sunday River School is an historic school on Sunday River Road, just north of its junction with Skiway Road, in Newry, Maine. Built in 1895 by the town, this is one of the best-preserved one-room schoolhouses in northern Oxford County. The school was listed on the National Register of Historic Places in 1978.

== Description and history ==
The school is a 1 1/2-story wood-frame structure, with a clapboarded exterior and a gable roof, and rests on a granite foundation. A single brick chimney pierces the roof, and a small ell, containing a passage and two privies, extends to the northeast. There are no windows in the south and east walls, and a bank of four sash windows in the north wall. The west wall has the main entrance, which is flanked on each side by sash windows, with a third window in the gable.

The interior is divided into three sections. The entrance opens into a vestibule area which extends across much of the western facade, with a small storage room on the northwest corner. Most of the building is taken up by the classroom. The classroom has a form of wainscoting using floorboards to a height of about 4 feet (1.2 m); the rest of the walls are plastered. A slate blackboard occupies most of the south wall. The room is filled with original desks made of wood and cast iron, with glass ink wells. Other furniture includes the original desk and teacher's chair, a wooden table, bookcases which hold most of the library collection of the former town of Grafton, and a stove. Maps of Maine dating to the 1860s adorn the walls.

The school was built by the town of Newry in 1895 to serve its district number 1 student population. It was used by the town until the 1940s, when its schools were consolidated into a larger district. It has since been used as a community center and Sunday school.

== See also ==
- National Register of Historic Places listings in Oxford County, Maine
