= Bell Hill School =

- U.S. National Register of Historic Places
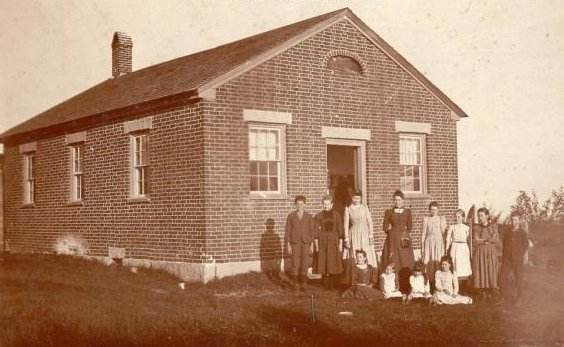
- Bell Hill School, c. 1899

- Location within Maine Location within the United States
- Nearest city: 185 Bell Hill Road, Otisfield, Maine
- Coordinates: 44°5′15″N 70°33′35″W
- Area: 0.1 acres (0.040 ha)
- NRHP reference No.: 03000619
- Added to NRHP: July 10, 2003

The Bell Hill School or District Number One School is an historic school in Otisfield, Maine. The one-room brick schoolhouse was one of three completed in 1839 for the town, and is the only one to survive. It served the town as a district school until 1940. It was acquired in 1950 by the Bell Hill Meetinghouse Association (which also owns the adjacent Bell Hill Meetinghouse), and has been converted into a local history museum. The building was listed on the National Register of Historic Places in 2003.

== Description ==
The Bell Hill School is a single-story brick structure, measuring about 18 feet (5.5 m) by 30 feet (9.1 m), resting on a granite foundation. It has a front-facing gable roof with low pitch, covered in asphalt shingles. The cornices are simple wooden boxes, with a piece of ogee moulding on the eave wall. The main (southern) facade has three bays, with a centered doorway flanked by sash windows. The north and west facades have three sash windows each, while the east facade has two windows flanking a chimney. The brick is laid in Flemish bond on two facades and American bond on the other two; it is not clear if the walls were originally built this way or if it was the result of later restoration work.

The interior of the school is divided into a foyer area and a single classroom. The foyer contains a small washbasin, shelf, and towel rack. The walls are finished in plaster above irregularly-sized wainscoting. The western wall of the classroom is covered in fiberboard painted black, which was used as a blackboard.

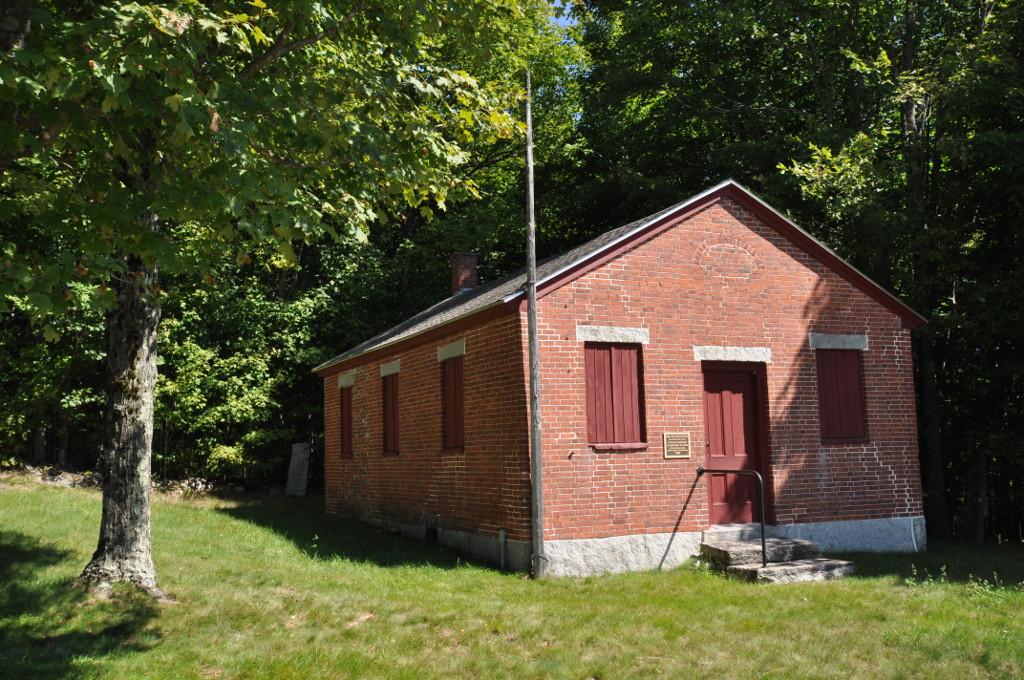
The school in 2014

The building has had only modest alterations. An opening in the western gable is filled with brick; its original decoration is unknown. In 1902 a woodshed and outhouse were attached to the school's north facade; these were removed after the school was closed in 1940, including the restoration of brick in a doorway space that had been opened between the school and that structure.

== History ==
The Bell Hill School was one of three brick schoolhouses built in Otisfield in 1839. Their designer and builder are unknown. The town reached its height of population in 1840, and declined from 1307 in that year to 488 in 1940. Its other schools were eventually consolidated and adapted for residential use, while the Bell Hill School remained open until 1940. The building was sold by the town to the Bell Hill Meeting House Association in 1955, which oversaw its restoration, and opens it to the public.

== See also ==
- National Register of Historic Places listings in Oxford County, Maine
