= Former Greenwood Town Hall =

- Greenwood Town Hall, Former
- U.S. National Register of Historic Places
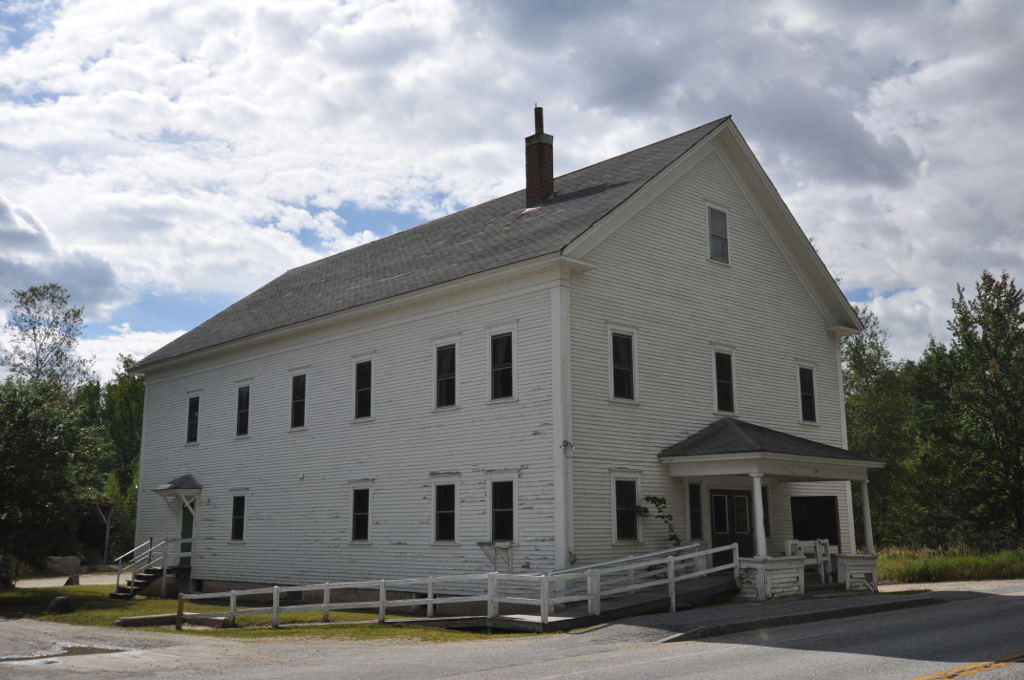

- Location within Maine Location within the United States
- Location: 270 Main St., Locke Mills, Maine
- Coordinates: 44°24′4″N 70°42′22″W
- Area: less than one acre
- Built: 1930
- Architectural style: Late Victorian
- NRHP reference No.: 00001634
- Added to NRHP: January 11, 2001

The Former Greenwood Town Hall is located at 270 Main Street (Maine State Route 26) in Locke Mills, the main village of Greenwood, Maine. Completed in 1931, the building has been a center of civic and social activities since, hosting town meetings, elections, school graduations, dances, and private functions. It was replaced as town hall by the present facilities in 1988, and is now maintained by a local non-profit. It was listed on the National Register of Historic Places in 2001.

== Description and history ==
The former Greenwood Town Hall is a large two story wood-frame structure, three bays wide and six deep, with a front gable roof. The main entrance is centered on the front (north-facing) facade, and is sheltered by a hip-roof portico supported by Tuscan columns. The entry is flanked by sash windows on either side, with three matching windows on the second level, and a slightly smaller window set in the gable end above. The west elevation has a secondary entrance in the last bay, and four of the remaining five bays on the first floor have windows, while all do so on the second floor. The rear elevation has a small shed-roof addition with pit toilets.

The main entrance opens into a full-width vestibule area with a broad stairway leading to the second floor. Behind the vestibule is a space originally used to house town offices. The upstairs contains a large auditorium space, with a stage at the southern end. The vestibule and auditorium feature varnished wainscoting, the remainder of the walls being finished in fiberboard, which has retained original color in the vestibule.

Despite contradictory information in town histories placing the hall's construction in 1932 or 1933, the town's records indicate funds were appropriate for its construction in 1929 and 1930, and that the first town meeting held in the hall took place in 1931. Construction of the hall appears to have been a community effort, which included significant donations of materials and labor. The total cost paid by the town for the building was $8,000.

The hall immediately became a social and civic center for the town. It hosted school graduation ceremonies, town meetings, musical performances, theatrical events, and dances (which continue to be held periodically now). During the Second World War, members of the National Guard drilled in the auditorium. In 1988 the town offices were moved to a new facility; the building is now cared for by a local non-profit organization. It was listed on the National Register of Historic Places in 2001.

== See also ==
- National Register of Historic Places listings in Oxford County, Maine
