= Vail site =

- Vail Site
- U.S. National Register of Historic Places
- Location: Parkertown Township, Maine
- Area: 7.5 acres (3.0 ha)
- NRHP reference No.: 80000246 (original); 84001474 (increase)

Significant dates
- Added to NRHP: January 23, 1980
- Boundary increase: January 11, 1984

The Vail Site is a prehistoric Native American archaeological site in the remote north of Oxford County, Maine. It is located along an ancient course of the Magalloway River in an area that is occasionally under the waters of the man-made Aziscohos Lake. The site was discovered in 1979, and has been the subject of several archaeological excavations since then. The site includes at least eight encampment areas (tent sites) and a significant kill zone where the Native Americans killed a large number of caribou. A 1-acre (0.40 ha) section of the site was listed on the National Register of Historic Places in 1980; this listing was enlarged to 7.5 acres (3.0 ha) in 1984.

== Description ==
Six of the eight tent sites excavated in 1980 exhibited significant evidence of tool work and a number of well-shaped stone projectile points. The other two tent sites were located closer to the ancient river channel, and may have been subject to flooding. These sites are estimated to have supported a population of 36 to 60 individuals, and are believed to have been occupied for only 8 to 10 years. They were laid out in an arc measuring about 110 metres (120 yd) in length. Finds at these tent sites are closely correlated to finds at the kill site, which was located on the opposite shore of the ancient channel. The site is believed to have been occupied by Paleo-Indians about 13,000 years ago. The ten-year occupation period is consistent with the practices of Alaskan Natives in historic times, who would occupy camps for a similar time period, abandoning them when the caribou herd that traversed the area was depleted.

== See also ==
- National Register of Historic Places listings in Oxford County, Maine
