= Osgood Family House =

Historic house in Maine, United States

- U.S. National Register of Historic Places
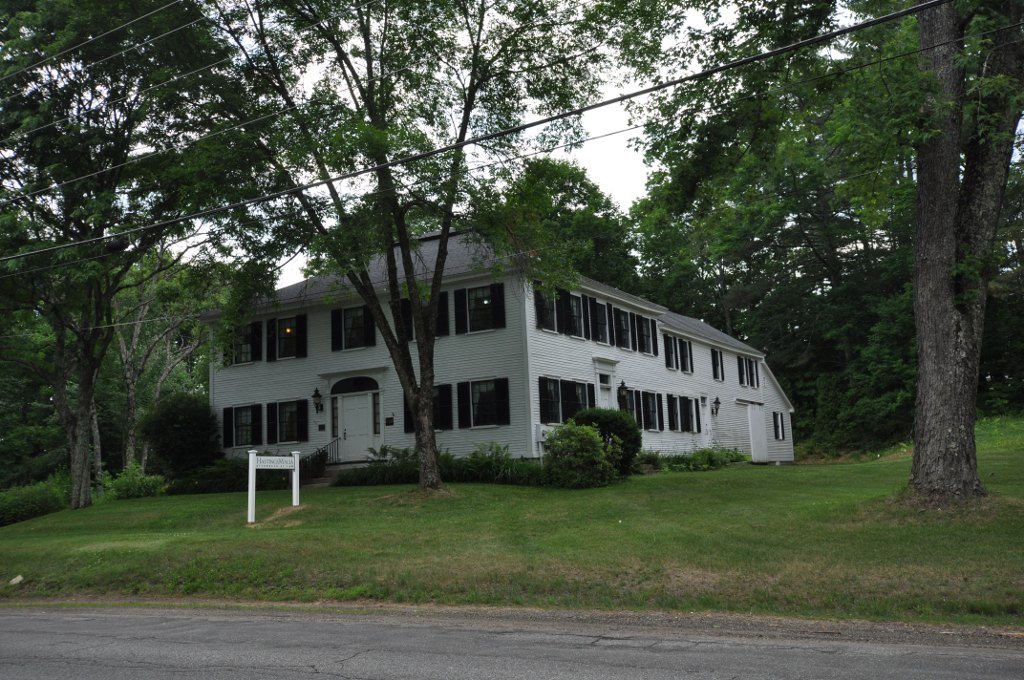

- Location within Maine Location within the United States
- Location: Main St., Fryeburg, Maine
- Coordinates: 44°0′42″N 70°59′15″W
- Area: 1 acre (0.40 ha)
- Built: 1810
- Architectural style: Federal
- NRHP reference No.: 90000576
- Added to NRHP: April 5, 1990

The Osgood Family House is a historic house on Main Street in Fryeburg, Maine. Built c. 1810, this two-story structure is one of the least-altered and best-preserved Federal style houses in town. It was probably built by Henry Young Brown Osgood, and remained in the Osgood family until 1940. It was listed on the National Register of Historic Places in 1990. It later housed a law office.

== Description and history ==
The main block of the Osgood House is a two-story wood-frame structure, five bays in width and depth, with a hip roof and a granite foundation. A two-story gable-roofed ell extends to the west, ending in a small shed which replicates an earlier, similar structure. The main entrance, facing east, is flanked by sidelight windows and topped by a louvered fan. A secondary entrance is centered on the south facade, framed by pilasters and a transom window and entablature. The interior follows a fairly typical Federal period central hall plan, with turned newel post and balusters, and applied sawn ornamentation. Federal style paneling, door and window molding, and chair rails decorate the public rooms.

The house was probably built by Henry Young Brown Osgood, who was named for one Fryeburg's early proprietors, although the land was bought, and may have been settled by, his father before him. The house remained in the Osgood family until 1940. Unlike other late-18th and early-19th century houses in Fryeburg, the Osgood House has not had later stylistic alterations made. It underwent a restoration around the time of its listing on the National Register of Historic Places in 1990.

== See also ==
- National Register of Historic Places listings in Oxford County, Maine
