= Former Otisfield Town House =

- Otisfield Town House (Former)
- U.S. National Register of Historic Places
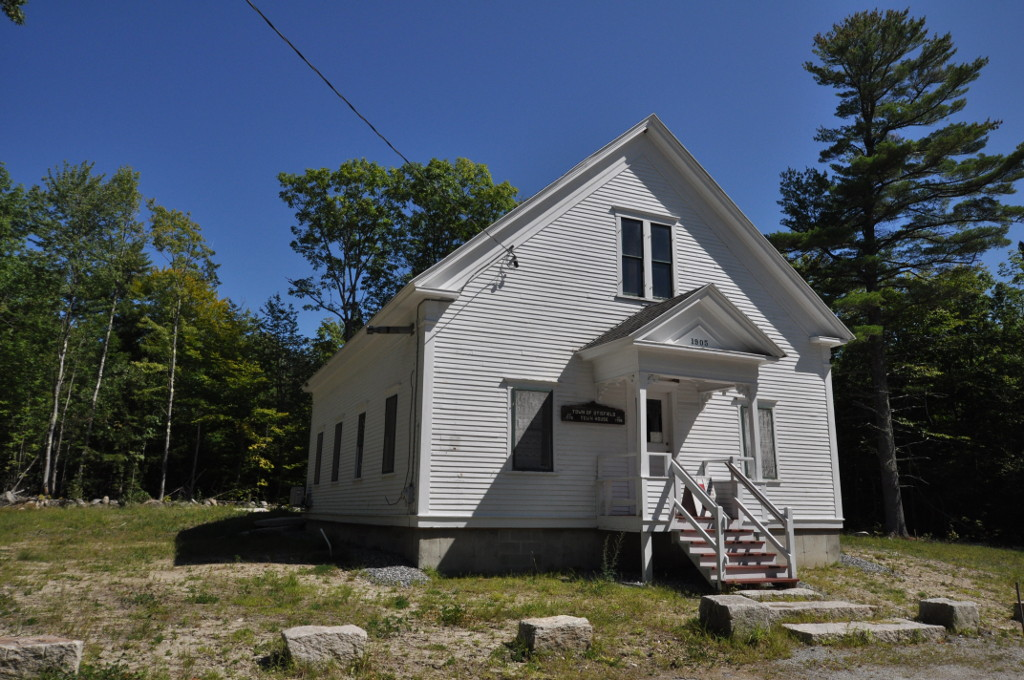

- Location within Maine Location within the United States
- Location: 53 Bell Hill Rd., Otisfield, Maine
- Coordinates: 44°4′54″N 70°33′14″W
- Area: 0.2 acres (0.081 ha)
- Built: 1905
- Architectural style: Greek Revival, Late Victorian
- NRHP reference No.: 05000055
- Added to NRHP: February 15, 2005

The Former Otisfield Town House is a former town hall building at 53 Bell Hill Road in Otisfield, Maine. Built in 1905 to replace a structure dating to the 1790s, it is architecturally reminiscent of mid-19th century rural Maine town halls. It was used as town hall until 1985, and as a polling place until 2002. It was listed on the National Register of Historic Places in 2005.

== Description and history ==
The town house is a single-story wood-frame structure, with a front-gable roof and a small entrance portico. The main (west-facing) facade is three bays wide, with a center entrance flanked by sash windows. The entrance portico has a fully pedimented gable front on a simple entablature, and is supported by square posts decorated with sawn brackets. Above the entry in the main gable end are a pair of narrower sash windows. The building is four bays deep, and has two small additions in the rear. One houses a pair of primitive toilets, and the other, a rectangular brick structure, houses a vault.

The interior of the town house's main block consists of a single large chamber, with doors at the east end leading to the toilets and vault. The interior finish is varnished pine on the walls and ceiling, and fir flooring. The wall finish is vertically laid wainscoting below the windows, and horizontal above the chair rail. A simple, low rail-and-style fence separates a holding area for voting booths, and there is a raised platform for the selectmen's table near the doorway to the vault. The building was electrified in 1937, retaining its original fixtures, and the vault was provided in 1935 by the Herring-Hall-Marvin Safe Company of Cincinnati, Ohio.

Otisfield's first town hall was in the style of a colonial meeting house, used for both religious and civic purposes, and was built c. 1795. In 1838 the local congregation built a new meetinghouse for its use, and the town, rather than constructing a new building for civic use, moved the old structure a short way down the hill. By the early 20th century, that building was failing, and the town built this structure on the old one's site. It was used not just for town functions, but was also rented out for private events. It housed Otisfield's town meetings until 1985, and was used as a polling place until 2002.

== See also ==
- National Register of Historic Places listings in Oxford County, Maine
