= Hersey Plow Company Building =

- U.S. National Register of Historic Places
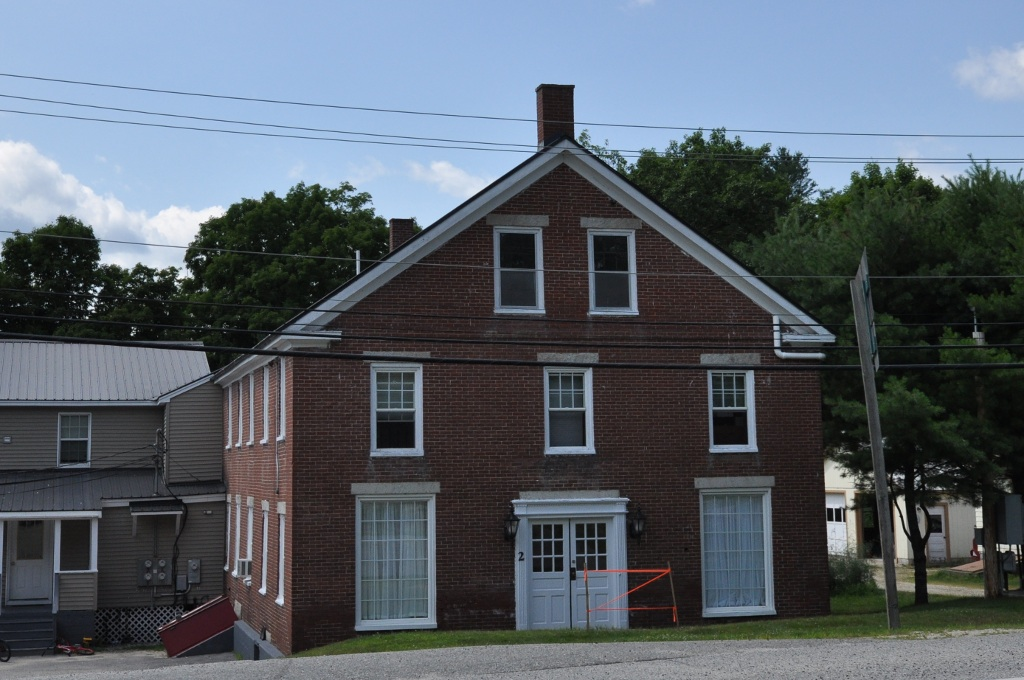

- Location within Maine Location within the United States
- Location: Hill St. near Stony Brook, South Paris, Maine
- Coordinates: 44°13′21″N 70°30′25″W
- Area: less than one acre
- Built: 1848
- Architectural style: Greek Revival
- NRHP reference No.: 90000922
- Added to NRHP: June 14, 1990

The Hersey Plow Company Building is a historic industrial building on Hill Street in South Paris, Maine. Believed to have been built about 1848, this brick structure is a rare small industrial building in the interior of Maine. It originally served as a warehouse and sales facility of the Hersey Plow Company, operated by various members of the Hersey family between 1835 and 1862. The building was listed on the National Register of Historic Places in 1990 (where the name is misspelled "Hershey".

== Description and history ==
The brick building is two stories high, and three bays wide, with a gable roof. Its modest Greek Revival styling includes granite sills and lintels on the windows, and narrow cornice boards and gable returns. The main entrance is centered in the front facade, flanked by long sash windows. The second level has smaller sash windows, and there are a pair of sash windows in the gable end. The windows on the sides are similar to those on the front, although those on the second level were shortened at some point. A two-story wood frame addition, of uncertain construction date but before about 1880, extends to the rear.

The interior of the building, when built, was apparently an unadorned open space on both levels, and has seen a degree of partition over the years. The rear addition has seen more significant alterations, including changes to its fenestration.

The Hersey Plow Company was established by Simeon Hersey and two partners in 1835. Within a few years, it had grown, and was located to the site of the present building, on the banks of Stony Brook. Here the company built a large works, and dammed the river to harness its power. This plant was completely destroyed by fire in 1842. New facilities were then built on the site, including this building, which served as the sales room and warehouse. No other elements of the Hersey plant survive. Herseys continued to operate the company until 1862, when it was sold to F. C. Merrill. Merrill continued the business, but apparently stopped using this building around 1880.

== See also ==
- National Register of Historic Places listings in Oxford County, Maine
