= National Register of Historic Places listings in Oxford County, Maine =

Location of Oxford County in Maine

This is a list of the National Register of Historic Places listings in Oxford County, Maine.

This is intended to be a complete list of the properties and districts on the National Register of Historic Places in Oxford County, Maine, United States. Latitude and longitude coordinates are provided for many National Register properties and districts; these locations may be seen together in a map.

There are 103 properties and districts listed on the National Register in the county. One property was once listed, but as since been delisted.

This National Park Service list is complete through NPS recent listings posted September 11, 2026.

Contents: Counties and municipalities in Maine
Androscoggin - Aroostook - Cumberland (City of Portland) - Franklin - Hancock - Kennebec - Knox - Lincoln - Oxford - Penobscot - Piscataquis - Sagadahoc - Somerset - Waldo - Washington - York

== Current listings ==
	Name on the Register	Image	Date listed	Location	City or town	Description
1	Albany Town House	Albany Town House	August 7, 2007 (#07000793)	Junction of State Routes 5 and 35; 44°19′27″N 70°46′10″W	Albany Township	
2	Andover Hook and Ladder Company Building	Andover Hook and Ladder Company Building	January 11, 2001 (#00001631)	39 Elm St. 44°38′10″N 70°44′59″W	Andover	
3	Andover Public Library	Andover Public Library	January 27, 1981 (#81000103)	Church St. 44°37′54″N 70°45′07″W	Andover	
4	Barrows-Steadman Homestead	Barrows-Steadman Homestead	April 12, 1982 (#82000771)	NE corner of Main and Stuart St. 44°01′04″N 70°58′47″W	Fryeburg	
5	Bell Hill Meetinghouse	Bell Hill Meetinghouse	July 10, 2003 (#03000620)	191 Bell Hill Rd. 44°05′17″N 70°33′36″W	Otisfield	
6	Bell Hill School	Bell Hill School	July 10, 2003 (#03000619)	185 Bell Hill Rd. 44°05′15″N 70°33′35″W	Otisfield	
7	Bennett Bridge	Bennett Bridge	February 16, 1970 (#70000055)	1.5 miles (2.4 km) south of Wilsons Mills off State Route 16, over the Magalloway River; 44°55′04″N 71°02′21″W	Wilsons Mills	
8	Nathaniel and Elizabeth Bennett House	Nathaniel and Elizabeth Bennett House	June 7, 1996 (#96000652)	Western side of Crockett Ridge Rd., 1.4 miles (2.3 km) north of its junction with State Route 117; 44°13′57″N 70°34′31″W	Norway	
9	Brick School	Brick School	June 26, 2017 (#100001241)	3 E. Main St. 44°13′23″N 70°30′42″W	Paris	
10	Brickett Place	Brickett Place	July 28, 1982 (#82000772)	State Route 113; 44°16′03″N 71°00′18″W	Stow	
11	Broad Street Historic District	Broad Street Historic District	December 28, 1977 (#77000078)	Broad St. and the Common; also along Church and Park Sts. 44°24′07″N 70°47′23″W	Bethel	Second set of addresses represents a boundary increase
12	Camp Cinnamon	Camp Cinnamon	September 30, 2019 (#100004470)	37 Camp Cinnamon Rd. 44°13′28″N 70°39′37″W	Norway	
13	Center Meeting House and Common	Center Meeting House and Common	June 20, 1997 (#97000606)	476 Main St. 44°08′18″N 70°28′18″W	Oxford	
14	Squire Chase House	Squire Chase House	May 7, 1979 (#79000158)	Main St., SW of junction with Bridgton Rd. 44°01′15″N 70°58′34″W	Fryeburg	
15	Church of the New Jerusalem	Church of the New Jerusalem	June 13, 1986 (#86001274)	4 Oxford St. 44°00′56″N 70°58′51″W	Fryeburg	
16	Churchill Bridge	Churchill Bridge	March 17, 1994 (#94000180)	Mountain Rd. across Bicknell Brook, 1 mile (1.6 km) west of its junction with Sodom Rd. 44°14′44″N 70°23′10″W	Buckfield	
17	Cole Block	Cole Block	April 1, 1998 (#98000310)	19 Main St. 44°24′26″N 70°47′33″W	Bethel	
18	Deering Memorial United Methodist Church	Deering Memorial United Methodist Church	January 24, 2008 (#07001444)	39 Main St. 44°13′23″N 70°30′55″W	Paris	Sidney Badgley and William H. Nicklas, architects (1911).
19	District No. 1 Schoolhouse	District No. 1 Schoolhouse	July 19, 1984 (#84001466)	515 Main St. 44°00′54″N 70°58′57″W	Fryeburg	Now the library.
20	Dreamhome	Dreamhome	September 27, 1996 (#96001037)	Western side of Lake Christopher, 0.45 miles (0.72 km) north of Hill Rd. 44°22′16″N 70°39′10″W	Bryant Pond	
21	Eastman Hill Rural Historic District	Eastman Hill Rural Historic District	June 8, 1993 (#93000477)	Eastman Hill Rd. east of Center Lovell; 44°10′17″N 70°52′17″W	Center Lovell	
22	First Universalist Society of West Sumner	First Universalist Society of West Sumner	August 9, 2002 (#02000850)	1114 Main St. 44°21′58″N 70°27′40″W	Sumner	
23	Fives Court	Fives Court	October 5, 2017 (#16000676)	55 Fairburn Way, Westways; 44°12′54″N 70°53′14″W	Lovell	An early 20th-century fives court.
24	Forest Lodge	Forest Lodge	December 30, 2008 (#08001257)	Carry Rd., about 1.9 miles (3.1 km) west of Middle Dam; 44°46′00″N 70°57′01″W	Upton	
25	Foster Family Home	Foster Family Home	November 9, 1994 (#94001247)	Western side of Sunday River Rd., 1.5 miles (2.4 km) northwest of its junction with Skiway Rd. 44°29′28″N 70°50′35″W	Newry	
26	Fryeburg Registry of Deeds	Fryeburg Registry of Deeds	December 30, 1987 (#87002196)	Main St., next to the library 44°00′53″N 70°58′59″W	Fryeburg	
27	Fryeburg Town House, Former	Fryeburg Town House, Former	October 2, 1992 (#92001295)	Eastern side of State Route 5, 0.1 miles (0.16 km) north of its junction with Woodlawn Ave. (now Corn Shop Rd.); 44°04′14″N 70°56′43″W	Fryeburg Center	
28	Gehring Clinic	Gehring Clinic	August 2, 1976 (#76000105)	Off State Route 5; 44°23′58″N 70°47′16″W	Bethel	
29	Gilead Railroad Station	Gilead Railroad Station	June 24, 2024 (#100010457)	8 Depot Street; 44°23′40″N 70°58′21″W	Gilead	Previously listed when it was located in Auburn.
30	Greenwood Cattle Pound	Greenwood Cattle Pound	August 7, 2007 (#07000794)	Greenwood Rd., 0.33 miles (0.53 km) north of State Route 219; 44°19′21″N 70°39′18″W	Greenwood	
31	Greenwood Town Hall, Former	Greenwood Town Hall, Former	January 11, 2001 (#00001634)	270 Main St. 44°24′04″N 70°42′22″W	Locke Mills	
32	Hall House	Hall House	October 31, 2002 (#02001271)	10 Kilborn St. 44°24′25″N 70°47′09″W	Bethel	
33	Enoch Hall House	Enoch Hall House	December 23, 1993 (#93001431)	Western side of Bean Rd., 0.5 miles (0.80 km) southeast of its junction with State Route 117; 44°16′57″N 70°20′38″W	Buckfield	
34	Hemlock Bridge	Hemlock Bridge	February 16, 1970 (#70000056)	Northeast of Fryeburg Center, over the Old Course Saco River; 44°04′46″N 70°54′13″W	Fryeburg Center	
35	Hershey Plow Company Building	Hershey Plow Company Building	June 14, 1990 (#90000922)	Hill St. near Stony Brook; 44°13′21″N 70°30′25″W	South Paris	
36	Hubbard-Cotton Store	Hubbard-Cotton Store	June 14, 1990 (#90000923)	State Routes 5/113 across the Saco River from their junction with State Route 117; 43°52′28″N 70°48′19″W	Hiram	
37	Deacon Hutchins House	Deacon Hutchins House	July 10, 1979 (#79000159)	Northwest of Rumford on State Route 5; 44°32′47″N 70°41′42″W	Rumford	
38	Moses Hutchins House	Moses Hutchins House	April 22, 2003 (#03000290)	Junction of State Route 6 and Old Stage Rd. 44°08′51″N 70°53′02″W	Lovell	
39	J&O Irish Store	J&O Irish Store	December 29, 1983 (#83003666)	State Route 140; 44°22′22″N 70°20′52″W	Hartford	Now a local history museum.
40	Zadoc Long Free Library	Zadoc Long Free Library	June 24, 1994 (#94000636)	Southern side of State Route 117 at its junction with State Route 140; 44°17′22″N 70°21′55″W	Buckfield	John Calvin Stevens, architect (1900-01).
41	Lovejoy Bridge	Lovejoy Bridge	February 16, 1970 (#70000057)	Over the Ellis River; 44°35′37″N 70°44′02″W	South Andover	
42	Lovell Meeting House	Lovell Meeting House	June 27, 2014 (#14000360)	1133 Main St. 44°11′03″N 70°53′25″W	Lovell	
43	Lovell Village Church	Lovell Village Church	June 20, 1986 (#86001337)	Church St. 44°07′40″N 70°53′36″W	Lovell	Ammi Cutter, architect (1851).
44	Lower Meeting House and East Bethel Cemetery	Lower Meeting House and East Bethel Cemetery	June 25, 2013 (#13000440)	1797 Intervale Road; 44°27′53″N 70°43′17″W	Bethel	
45	Lower Sunday River School	Lower Sunday River School	May 23, 1978 (#78000189)	Southwest of Newry on Sunday River Rd. 44°28′20″N 70°49′57″W	Newry	
46	Main Street Historic District	Main Street Historic District	March 22, 1991 (#91000324)	Main Street from Portland St. to about Swans Falls Rd. 44°01′15″N 70°58′35″W	Fryeburg	
47	Maine Archaeological Survey site 21.26		September 5, 1997 (#97000915)	Address restricted	Lovell	
48	Arthur L. Mann Memorial Library	Arthur L. Mann Memorial Library	January 5, 1989 (#88003016)	Main St. 44°19′30″N 70°34′27″W	West Paris	
49	Dr. Moses Mason House	Dr. Moses Mason House	October 17, 1972 (#72000110)	Broad St. 44°24′18″N 70°47′32″W	Bethel	Bethel Historical Society property.
50	McLaughlin House and Garden	McLaughlin House and Garden	October 27, 2000 (#00001202)	97 Main St. 44°13′08″N 70°31′03″W	South Paris	
51	McWain-Hall House	McWain-Hall House	March 25, 1987 (#87000416)	McWain Hill Rd. 44°11′14″N 70°40′10″W	Waterford	
52	Mechanic Institute	Mechanic Institute	May 13, 1980 (#80000241)	44-56 Congress St. 44°32′46″N 70°32′45″W	Rumford	
53	Merrill-Poor House	Merrill-Poor House	May 17, 1976 (#76000106)	Northeast of Andover on State Route 120; 44°38′09″N 70°44′19″W	Andover	
54	Middle Intervale Meeting House and Common	Middle Intervale Meeting House and Common	June 26, 1998 (#98000721)	757 Intervale Rd. 44°27′51″N 70°47′11″W	Bethel	
55	Municipal Building	Municipal Building	May 13, 1980 (#80000242)	Congress St. 44°32′48″N 70°32′47″W	Rumford	
56	North Waterford Congregational Church	North Waterford Congregational Church	June 13, 1986 (#86001275)	Off State Route 35; 44°16′57″N 70°46′24″W	North Waterford	
57	Norway Historic District	Norway Historic District	July 21, 1988 (#88000391)	Roughly bounded by Pearl St., Danforth St. and Greenleaf Ave., Pennesseewassee Stream, and Main and Whitman Sts. 44°12′49″N 70°32′31″W	Norway	
58	The Nutting Homestead	The Nutting Homestead	December 3, 1974 (#74000163)	South of Otisfield off State Route 121; 44°04′14″N 70°32′37″W	Otisfield	
59	Osgood Family House	Osgood Family House	April 5, 1990 (#90000576)	Main St. 44°00′42″N 70°59′15″W	Fryeburg	
60	Otisfield Town House (Former)	Otisfield Town House (Former)	February 15, 2005 (#05000055)	53 Bell Hill Rd. 44°04′54″N 70°33′14″W	Otisfield	
61	Otisfield Town Pound		December 30, 2019 (#100004826)	Near 322 Bell Hill Rd. 44°05′43″N 70°34′00″W	Otisfield	
62	Oxford Congregational Church and Cemetery	Oxford Congregational Church and Cemetery	June 24, 1994 (#94000637)	Eastern side of King St., 0.2 miles (0.32 km) north of its junction with State Route 121; 44°08′02″N 70°29′30″W	Oxford	
63	Paris Hill Historic District	Paris Hill Historic District	June 19, 1973 (#73000243)	Main St. and Hannibal Hamlin Dr., east to Mt. Mica and Christian Ridge Rds. 44°15′44″N 70°30′07″W	Paris Hill	
64	Paris Public Library	Paris Public Library	January 5, 1989 (#88003015)	3 Main St. 44°13′24″N 70°30′53″W	South Paris	John Calvin Stevens, architect.
65	Marion Parsons House	Marion Parsons House	January 23, 1987 (#86002432)	179 Main St. 44°00′51″N 70°59′01″W	Fryeburg	
66	Peabody Tavern	Peabody Tavern	December 13, 1976 (#76000107)	East of Gilead on U.S. Route 2; 44°23′55″N 70°56′07″W	Gilead	
67	John M. Philbrook House	John M. Philbrook House	December 14, 1995 (#95001465)	32 Main St. 44°24′20″N 70°47′27″W	Bethel	Now the Victoria Inn
68	Samuel D. Philbrook House	Samuel D. Philbrook House	March 10, 1995 (#95000216)	162 Main St. 44°24′35″N 70°47′21″W	Bethel	
69	Pleasant Valley Grange No. 136		September 11, 2026 (#100013374)	721 West Bethel Road; 44°24′10″N 70°51′36″W	Bethel	
70	Porter Old Meetinghouse	Porter Old Meetinghouse	April 2, 1973 (#73000267)	North of Porter off State Route 25; 43°49′05″N 70°56′50″W	Porter	
71	Porter-Parsonfield Bridge	Porter-Parsonfield Bridge	February 16, 1970 (#70000058)	0.5 miles (0.80 km) south of Porter over the Ossipee River; 43°47′30″N 70°56′18″W	Porter	Extends into York County
72	E.C. and M.I. Record Homestead	E.C. and M.I. Record Homestead	August 24, 2011 (#11000582)	8 Bean Rd. 44°17′11″N 70°20′49″W	Buckfield	
73	Rivercroft Farm	Rivercroft Farm	July 16, 2008 (#08000668)	55, 59, and 60 River St. 44°01′05″N 70°59′32″W	Fryeburg	
74	Robinson-Parsons Farm	Robinson-Parsons Farm	February 4, 1982 (#82000773)	Town Farm Brook Rd. 44°11′28″N 70°29′59″W	Paris	
75	Rumford Center Meeting House		September 6, 2024 (#100010822)	1352 US Route 2; 44°30′46″N 70°36′47″W	Rumford	
76	Rumford Commercial Historic District	Rumford Commercial Historic District	March 27, 2017 (#100000808)	49-150 Congress, 65-91 Canal, 60-94 River & 23 Hartford Sts. 44°32′43″N 70°32′44″W	Rumford	
77	Rumford Falls I-IV Site		November 14, 1992 (#92001513)	Address Restricted	South Rumford	
78	Rumford Falls Paper Company Historic District	Rumford Falls Paper Company Historic District	December 4, 2024 (#100011132)	60 Lowell and 35 Hartford Streets; 44°32′48″N 70°32′37″W	Rumford	
79	Rumford Falls Power Company Building	Rumford Falls Power Company Building	May 13, 1980 (#80000243)	59 Congress St. 44°32′41″N 70°32′47″W	Rumford	
80	Rumford Falls V Site		November 14, 1992 (#92001509)	Address Restricted	South Rumford	
81	Rumford Point Congregational Church	Rumford Point Congregational Church	June 20, 1985 (#85001259)	Junction of U.S. Route 2 and State Route 5; 44°30′03″N 70°40′18″W	Rumford	Jonathan Adams Bartlett, architect (1865).
82	Rumford Public Library	Rumford Public Library	January 5, 1989 (#88003023)	Rumford Ave. 44°32′49″N 70°32′58″W	Rumford	John Calvin Stevens, architect (1903).
83	Ryefield Bridge	Ryefield Bridge	September 24, 1999 (#99001193)	West Andrew Hill Road over the Crooked River; 44°08′34″N 70°35′43″W	Otisfield	Extends into Harrison in Cumberland County
84	Levi Sargent House	Levi Sargent House	March 13, 1987 (#87000419)	Otisfield Gore Rd. 44°08′58″N 70°33′52″W	Otisfield	
85	Soldiers Memorial Library	Soldiers Memorial Library	October 16, 2008 (#08000992)	85 Main St. 43°52′56″N 70°47′52″W	Hiram	
86	Stearns Hill Farm	Stearns Hill Farm	February 11, 2009 (#09000014)	90 Stearns Hill Rd. 44°18′17″N 70°31′14″W	West Paris	
87	Elisha F. Stone House	Elisha F. Stone House	April 28, 1983 (#83000466)	Gothic St. 44°13′29″N 70°30′54″W	South Paris	
88	Strathglass Building	Strathglass Building	May 13, 1980 (#80000244)	33 Hartford St. 44°32′46″N 70°32′45″W	Rumford	
89	Strathglass Park District	Strathglass Park District	October 18, 1974 (#74000181)	Bounded by Lincoln Ave., Hancock St., Maine Ave., and York St. 44°33′03″N 70°33′06″W	Rumford	
90	Sturtevant Hall	Sturtevant Hall	September 19, 1977 (#77000079)	State Route 119; 44°12′02″N 70°24′34″W	Hebron	John Calvin Stevens, architect (1891).
91	Sunday River Bridge	Sunday River Bridge	February 16, 1970 (#70000059)	West of Newry, over the Sunday River; 44°29′31″N 70°50′36″W	Newry	Also known locally as the Artist's Bridge.
92	Town of Rumford Site		November 14, 1992 (#92001507)	Address Restricted	Rumford	
93	Union Church	Union Church	June 22, 1980 (#80000245)	Off State Route 140; 44°17′40″N 70°22′13″W	Buckfield	
94	Union School		June 20, 2018 (#100002593)	392 Church St. 44°23′25″N 70°18′44″W	Hartford	
95	Upton Grange No. 404 (Former)	Upton Grange No. 404 (Former)	October 12, 2000 (#00001206)	Junction of State Route 26 and Mill Rd. 44°41′40″N 71°00′43″W	Upton	
96	Vail Site		January 23, 1980 (#80000246)	Address Restricted	Parkertown Township	
97	Wadsworth Hall	Wadsworth Hall	January 21, 1974 (#74000182)	South of Hiram; 43°51′48″N 70°48′47″W	Hiram	
98	David Warren House	David Warren House	April 28, 1983 (#83000467)	Off State Route 140; 44°19′26″N 70°21′04″W	Hartford	
99	Waterford Historic District	Waterford Historic District	April 24, 1980 (#80000247)	State Routes 35 and 37; Boundary increase (listed August 23, 2011, refnum 11000583): 30 Valley Rd; 44°10′54″N 70°43′01″W	Waterford	
100	John Watson House	John Watson House	December 31, 1974 (#74000183)	1 mile (1.6 km) northwest of Hiram on Benny Babb Hill Road; 43°53′51″N 70°48′53″W	Hiram	
101	West Paris Lodge No. 15, I.O.O.F.	West Paris Lodge No. 15, I.O.O.F.	January 27, 2012 (#11001058)	221 Main St. 44°19′33″N 70°34′21″W	West Paris	
102	Whitman Memorial Library	Whitman Memorial Library	January 12, 1995 (#94001549)	1 mile (1.6 km) southwest of the junction of State Routes 26 and 232; 44°22′46″N 70°38′39″W	Bryant Pond	
103	Benjamin Wiley House	Benjamin Wiley House	November 10, 1980 (#80000248)	Southeast of North Fryeburg on Fish St. 44°06′18″N 70°57′44″W	North Fryeburg	

== Former listing ==
	Name on the Register	Image	Date listed	Date removed	Location	City or town	Description
1	Knight's Country Store		April 14, 1978 (#78000328)	August 5, 1987	ME 5A	Lovell vicinity	

== See also ==
- List of National Historic Landmarks in Maine
- National Register of Historic Places listings in Maine
