= Former Upton Grange No. 404 =

- Upton Grange No. 404 (Former)
- U.S. National Register of Historic Places
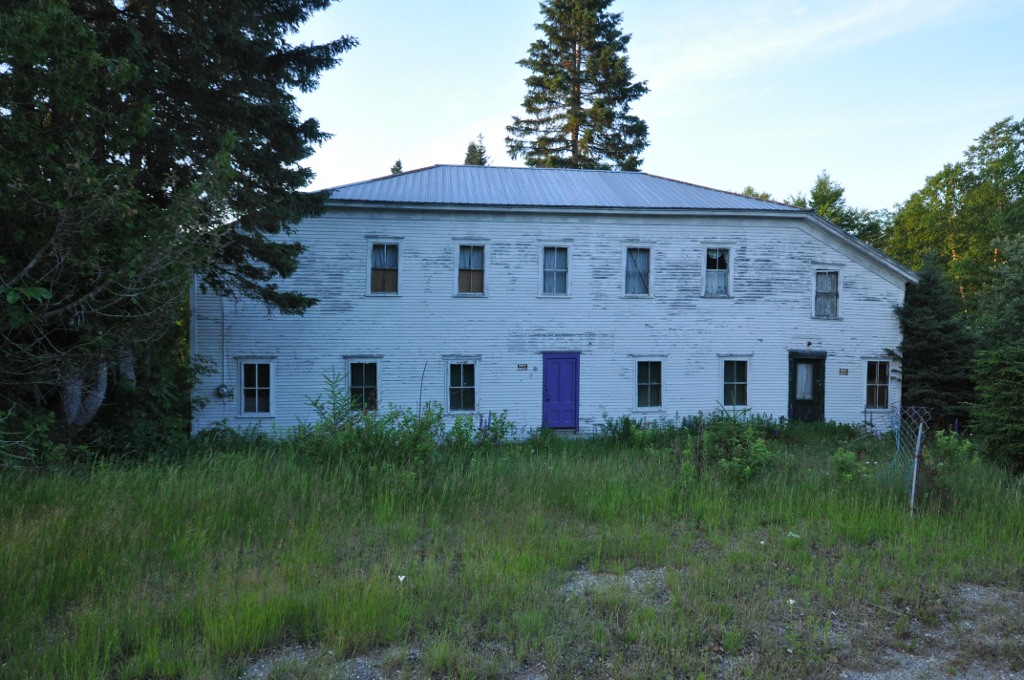

- Location within Maine Location within the United States
- Location: Jct. of ME 26 and Mill Rd., Upton, Maine
- Coordinates: 44°41′40″N 71°0′43″W
- Area: less than one acre
- Built: 1899
- NRHP reference No.: 00001206
- Added to NRHP: October 12, 2000

The Former Upton Grange No. 404 is a historic former Grange hall on Maine State Route 26 in rural Upton, Maine. Built in 1899, this now privately owned wood-frame building has seen a variety of commercial, civic and social uses. It was first used as a factory for the manufacture of spruce gum before being acquired by the local Grange chapter in 1911, and was used for social events as well as town meetings. It was listed on the National Register of Historic Places in 2000.

== Description and history ==
The Grange hall is a large rectangular clapboarded wood-frame structure with a central hip-roofed block flanked by shed-roofed additions. The main block is five bays wide, with a centered entrance; the left addition has a single window on the first floor, while the right addition has a second entry and window on the first floor, and another window on the second. The interior of the first floor consists of a large open space, with a raised platform at one end, and a storage area behind. At the east end of the building is another storage area, and stairs leading to the second floor, which is similar to the first, except there is no raised platform, and the storage area is larger.

The main block of the building was constructed in 1899 by Frank W. Bragg, a local resident who set up a spruce gum manufacturing operation on the premises. This business declined with the advent of new forms of chewing gum, so Bragg sold the building to the local Grange organization in 1911. The Grange converted the lower floor into a social and meeting venue, and it was used by the community for social events (dances and parties) as well as town meetings. This use continued until the Grange chapter dissolved in the 1970s, and the building was sold into private hands.

As of September 2024, the building is barely visible from Route 26, and is currently being restored by its new owners.

== See also ==
- National Register of Historic Places listings in Oxford County, Maine
