= Stearns Hill Farm =

- U.S. National Register of Historic Places
- U.S. Historic district
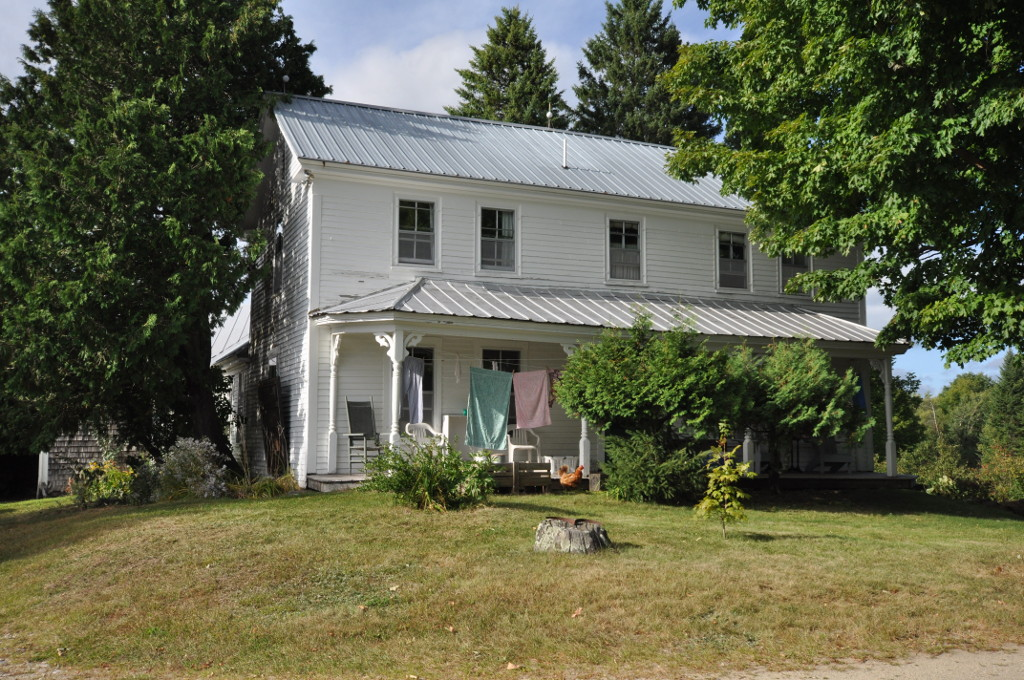

- Location within Maine Location within the United States
- Location: 90 Stearns Hill Rd., West Paris, Maine
- Coordinates: 44°18′46″N 70°31′25″W
- Area: 131 acres (53 ha)
- Built: 1818
- Architectural style: Queen Anne
- NRHP reference No.: 09000014
- Added to NRHP: February 11, 2009

Stearns Hill Farm is a historic farm at 90 Stearns Hill Road in West Paris, Maine. The farm is a well-preserved property which has been in continuous agricultural use since the late 18th century, most of that time in ownership by a single family. The property includes 131 acres (53 ha), which only deviate modestly from the farm's original boundaries, and it includes a traditional New England connected farmstead, and a "high-drive bank" barn, a type not normally seen in Maine. The property was listed on the National Register of Historic Places in 2009.

== Description ==
The farm is set on the crest of Stearns Hill, providing excellent views of the hills of southern Oxford County. The main farm complex is located on the north side of Stearns Hill Road, which executes a hairpin turn in woods below the ridge before rising to the farm property. The main complex includes the house as well as a historic barn, carriage house, and blacksmith's shop. A modern barn stands on the south side of the road. The farm's fields range around this cluster, and there are forested wood lots on both sides of the road. The fields are lined with stone walls. A sugar house for processing the sap of maple trees into maple syrup stands down the hill adjacent to the road.

The main house is an architecturally diverse structure, reflecting its evolution over time. Its oldest portion dates to the establishment of the farm c. 1797, and began as a single-story Cape. This modest origin is obscured by later alterations, which by the end of the 19th century transformed the house into a two-story main block with a single-story addition extending to its northeast (rear). It has a generally symmetrical appearance, with a full-width porch across its front which has modest Queen Anne styling.

The carriage house is a single-story timber-frame structure which joins the house (via the ell) to the barn. Its construction date is uncertain, but it was built before 1890, and is probably the most recently built part of the connected complex. The barn is a massive structure with four levels, which was developed in stages between about 1818 and 1915. The sugar house's construction date is unknown, but is believed by the family to have been built between 1856 and 1890. The blacksmith shop, which stands a short way east of the main complex, is of great age, and appears to predate the Stearns family ownership.

== History ==
The farm was purchased in 1818 by William Stearns, Jr. It is unclear from extant records exactly what buildings were standing at the time, but it appears that it included the blacksmith shop, and it may have included the ell of the present house. Stearns built what is now the front portion of the main house, as well as the early phases of the barn, between 1818 and 1830. The property was the subject of a foreclosure sale in 1844, but it was purchased by Stearns' brother and later sold to his son. It continues to be owned by Stearns descendants.

== See also ==
- National Register of Historic Places listings in Oxford County, Maine
