= Hall House (Bethel, Maine) =

Historic house in Maine, United States

- U.S. National Register of Historic Places
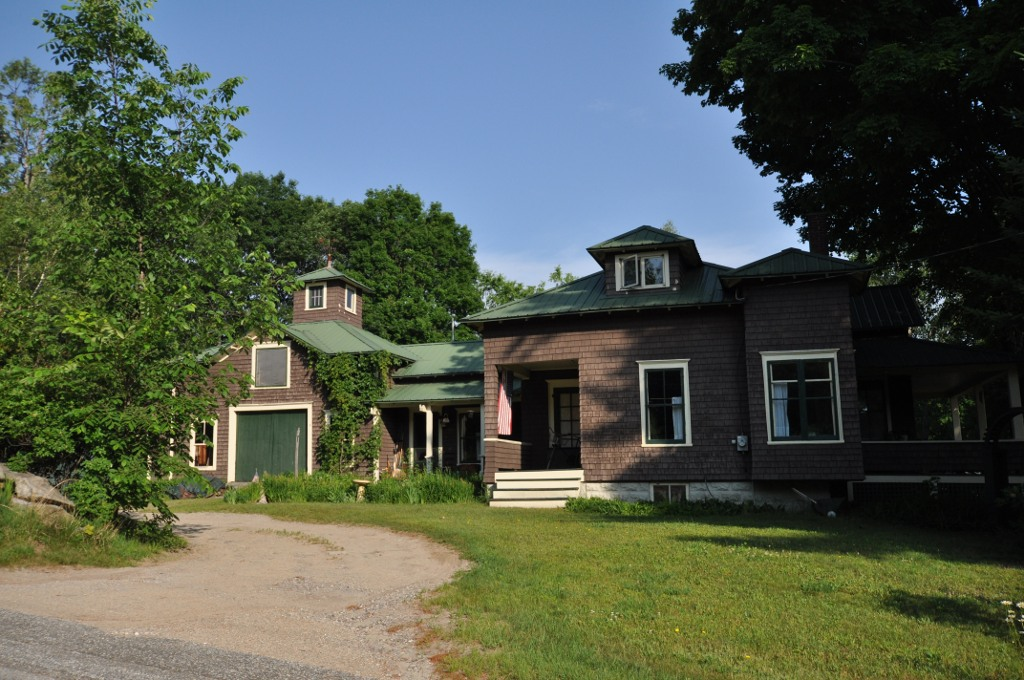

- Location within Maine Location within the United States
- Location: 10 Kilborn St., Bethel, Maine
- Coordinates: 44°24′25″N 70°47′9″W
- Area: 0.7 acres (0.28 ha)
- Built: 1910
- Architectural style: Bungalow/craftsman
- NRHP reference No.: 02001271
- Added to NRHP: October 31, 2002

The Hall House is a historic house at 10 Kilborn Street in Bethel, Maine. Built in 1910 by Dana and Alfaretta Hall, this house is a rare and distinctive local example of Craftsman style, especially in consideration of its setting in a small Maine town. Although it is predominantly Craftsman in style, it structurally harkens to the traditional connected farmsteads of rural New England. The house was listed on the National Register of Historic Places in 2002.

== Description and history ==
Little is known about the Hall family and their reasons for building this house. Apparently it was built to serve as either a retirement home or as an "in-town" house for the Halls, who were known to farm elsewhere in the county. The house was built over a three-month period in the summer of 1910.

The house is a wood-frame structure 1 1/2 stories in height, clad in shingles, with a hipped standing seam metal roof, and resting on a foundation of stone and stone-faced concrete. The main block of the house is connected to a similarly styled carriage house via a single-story hyphen which is fronted by a porch, reminiscent of typical New England connected farmsteads. Its main (south-facing) facade is three bays wide, with a slightly projecting tower-like section in the right bay, which has its own low-pitch pyramidal roof, The center section has a sash window, and the left bay has a recessed porch providing access to the entrance. A hip-roof dormer projects from the roof above the main facade. A porch on the east side wraps around to the north side of the house, separated from the tower projection by a fieldstone chimney. A rectangular projection intrudes on the porch, topped by a gable dormer.

The carriage house has a similar low-pitch hip roof to that found on the main house, with a gable end above the barn-style door that is centered on the southern facade. The roof is topped by a square cupola with small windows on each side, and its own pyramidal roof. The front gable provides space for a hay door above the main entrance.

The interior of the house is finished in plaster and trimmed in varnished pine. The kitchen has original cabinetry, and there is a builtin buffet in the dining room and a bookcase in the living room. The interior of the tower projection provides a small light-filled sitting area.

== See also ==
- National Register of Historic Places listings in Oxford County, Maine
