= Benjamin Wiley House =

Historic house in Maine, United States

- U.S. National Register of Historic Places
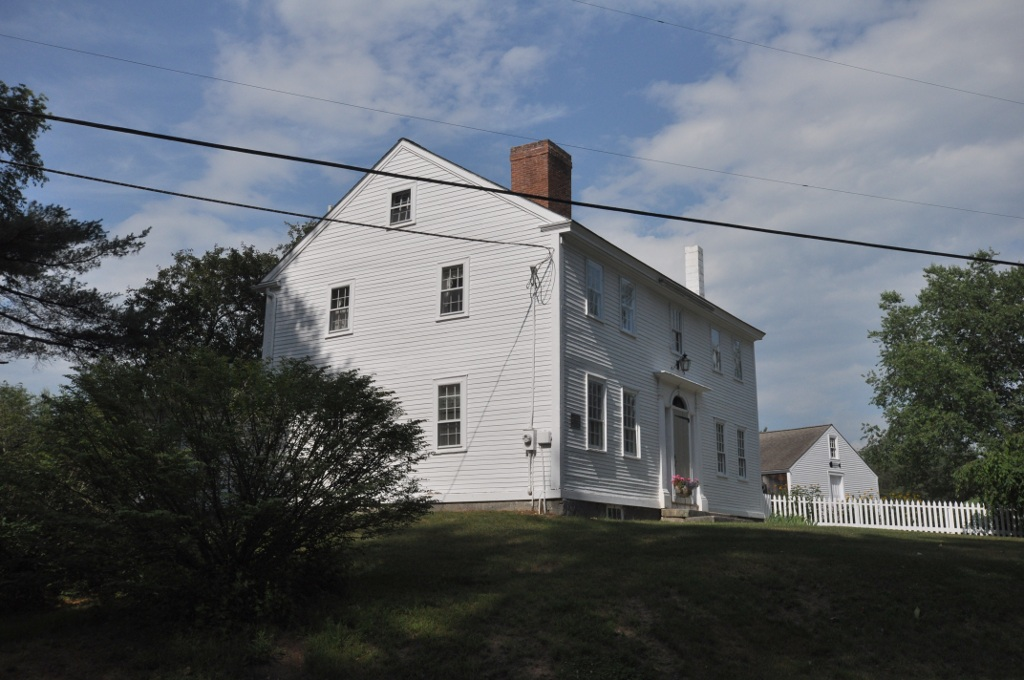

- Location within Maine Location within the United States
- Nearest city: Fryeburg, Maine
- Coordinates: 44°6′18″N 70°57′44″W
- Area: 1 acre (0.40 ha)
- Built: 1772
- Built by: Benjamin Wiley
- Architectural style: Federal
- NRHP reference No.: 80000248
- Added to NRHP: November 10, 1980

The Benjamin Wiley House is a historic house on Fish Street in a rural part of northern Fryeburg, Maine. Its oldest part dating to 1772, it is one of oldest buildings in the town. The portion, now the ell of a larger Federal-style structure built 1790–92, was built by Benjamin Wiley, one of Fryeburg's early settlers. The house, which demonstrates the organic growth of old houses in rural Maine, was listed on the National Register of Historic Places in 1980.

== Description and history ==
The main block of the Wiley House is a 2 1/2-story wood-frame structure, five bays wide, with a large central chimney, side-gable roof, and a cut granite foundation. The main entrance is centered on the front (southeast-facing) facade, and is flanked by sidelight windows and pilasters, which support an entablature that includes a fan in a keyed arch. A two-story ell extends to the east of the main block, fronted by a single-story porch, and a single-story shed extension connects the house to a barn.

The oldest portion of the house is the two-story ell, whose first floor was built in 1772 by Benjamin Wiley, one of Fryeburg's first proprietors and early settlers. The present Federal-style main block was built in 1790–92, and the remaining additions and alterations were made over the course of the 19th century. In addition to Wiley, other prominent occupants and owners of the house include Joseph Colby, a veteran of the War of 1812, Samuel Chandler, a state representative, and Enoch Barker, a stonemason noted for his work on the canals of Lowell, Massachusetts.

== See also ==
- National Register of Historic Places listings in Oxford County, Maine
