= Marilyn R. N. Mollicone =

American mycologist, botanist, and naturalist

- Born: Marilyn Rose Noyes; June 5, 1928; Bethel, Maine, USA
- Died: May 26, 2023 (aged 94); Augusta, Maine, USA
- Education: University of Maine
- Spouse: Phillip Mollicone (m. 1950; died 1978)
- Children: 2
- Scientific career
- Fields: Botany
- Doctoral advisor: Joyce Longcore

Marilyn Rose Noyes Mollicone (born Marilyn Rose Noyes June 5, 1928 – May 26, 2023) was an American botanist advancing mycology in Maine and advocating for naturalist education.

== Early and family life ==
Mollicone graduated from Gould Academy in 1946. She earned a bachelor's degree in botany from University of Maine and began graduate work upon her graduation in 1950. Marilyn married Phillip Mollicone later that year. They raised their two children in Winthrop, Maine. After a move to Augusta in 1975, Phillip died in 1978.

== Naturalist avocation ==
Mollicone participated in the Kennebec Rocks and Mineral Club, the Maine Iris Society, the New England Iris Society, the Kennebec Valley Garden Club, and the State Federation of Garden Clubs. She was an accredited Master Judge for the American Iris Society. She was the longest recorded member of the Josselyn Botanical Society. She help found Viles Arboretum. She directed the summer camp at the Augusta Nature Center for 19 years; she won the Augusta Mayor's Recognition of Excellence for this.

== Return to academia ==
Mollicone re-started her post-graduate education at the University of Maine in 1986. She finished her master's degree in botany and continued her studies towards a doctorate, studying under Joyce Longcore. Longcore's focus on chytrids supported Mollicone's own studies, as did Mollicone's connection to the Augusta Nature Center. Her focus began after she collected specimens from a pond in a quarry at the center of the Order Monoblepharidales (class Monoblepharidomycetes).

Her focuses in mycology led her to create detailed fungal stage description of Monoblepharidalean fungal cultures, freely accessible as a resource for teachers.

== Publications ==
- "Zoospore ultrastructure of Monoblepharis polymorpha", Journal Mycologia, 1994
- “Zoospore ultrastructure of Gonapodya polymorpha”, Journal Mycologia, 1999
- "Cytology and molecular phylogenetics of Monoblepharidomycetes provide evidence for multiple independent origins of the hyphal habit in the Fungi", Journal Mycologia, 2015

== Contributions ==
Mollicone provided photos for the paper "A molecular phylogeny of the flagellated fungi (Chytridiomycota) and description of a new phylum (Blastocladiomycota)"
