= Broad Street Historic District (Bethel, Maine) =

Historic district in Maine, United States

- U.S. National Register of Historic Places
- U.S. Historic district
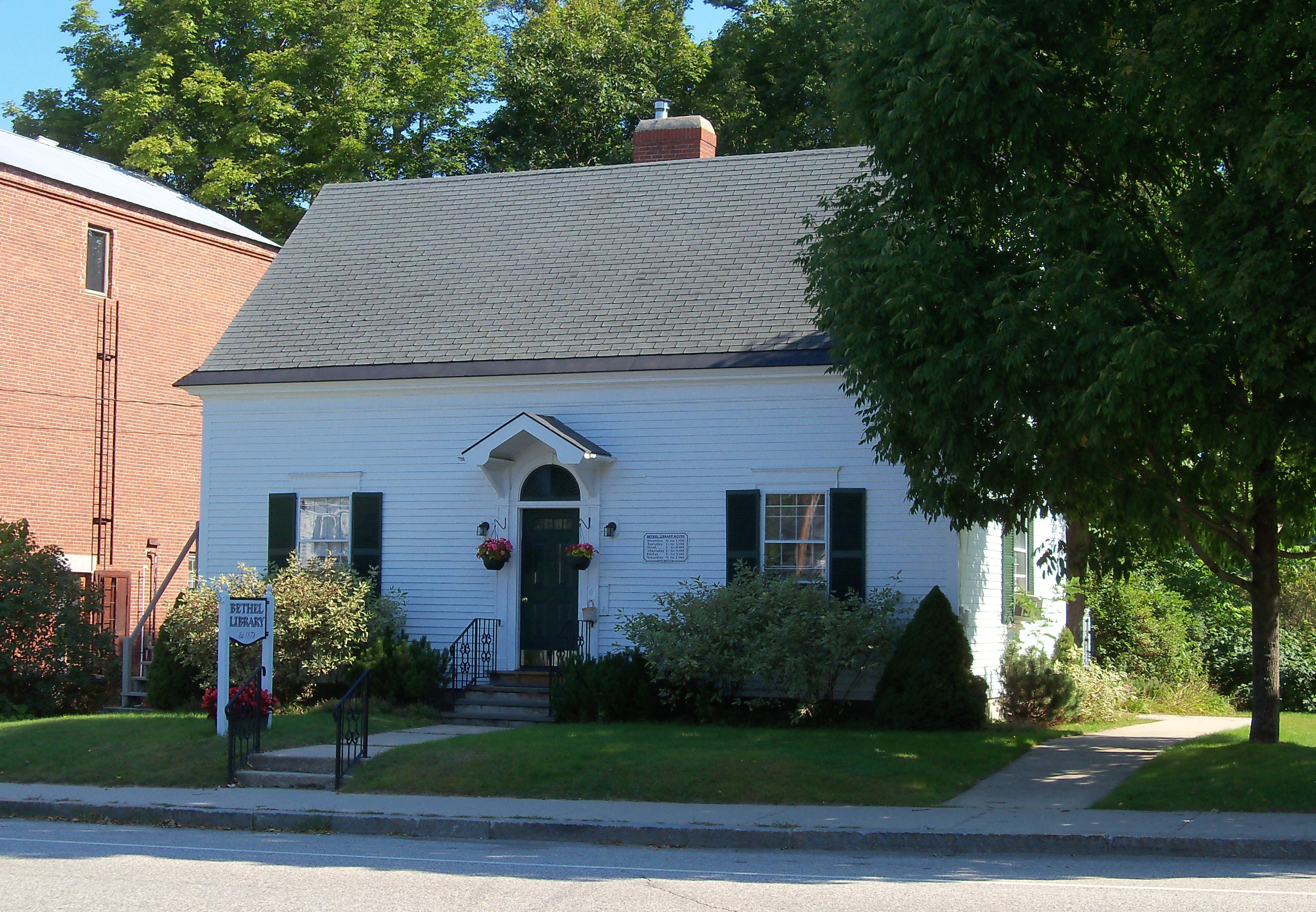
- The Bethel Public Library

- Location within Maine Location within the United States
- Location: Broad St. and the Common, Bethel, Maine
- Coordinates: 44.4044°N 70.79089°W
- Area: 37 acres (15 ha)
- Built: 1813
- Architectural style: Greek Revival, Late Victorian, Federal
- NRHP reference No.: 77000078 (original); 89002346 (increase)

Significant dates
- Added to NRHP: December 28, 1977
- Boundary increase: February 9, 1990

The Broad Street Historic District encompasses a significant portion of the historic center of Bethel, Maine. Broad Street dates to the early days of Bethel's settlement in the early 19th century, and its town common was a gift from the first settler of the area. As originally listed on the National Register of Historic Places in 1977, the district included the common and a section of Broad Street between Main Street and Paradise Hill Road. This was expanded in 1990 along Church Street to encompass historic homes and a portion of the Gould Academy campus.

== History ==
Bethel Hill was a small community in the early 19th century, numbering only four houses in 1814 (one of which, the Dr. Moses Mason House, still stands and is operated as a historic house museum by the Museums of the Bethel Historical Society). Broad Street was accepted by the town in 1807, and the town common, located on its northwest side, was supposedly given by Eleazer Twitchell, one of the area's first residents. Most of the buildings now lining the common date from the middle of the 19th century, with Greek Revival and Italianate styles predominating. Notable among these are Rowe's Store and Ideal Hall, a c. 1880 Italianate structure with an ornate front porch, the 1912 Colonial Revival Bethel Inn, and the Bethel Library, an 1865 Greek Revival building. The Mason House is now owned by the Bethel Historical Society.

Extending south from the common on Broad Street are a series of houses, most of which date to the same time period, along with a few that were built between 1880 and 1906. Most of these are Greek Revival, although there are a number of Italianate houses, as well as individual instances of Queen Anne, Stick, and Second Empire styling. Notable among these is the large Gehring Clinic, a 2-1/2 story Queen Anne house built in 1896, which marks the southern end of the district.

North of the common, Broad Street changes name to Church Street, and is lined by 19th-century houses up to the campus of the Gould Academy. While some of the houses in this stretch are Greek Revival, most of them are of the later Italianate and Gothic Revival styles. Two of the academy's main buildings, Gehring Hall and Hanscom Hall, are excellent Colonial Revival brick buildings built in the 1930s.

== See also ==
- National Register of Historic Places listings in Oxford County, Maine
