= Dr. Moses Mason House =

Historic house in Maine, United States

- Dr. Moses and Agnes Straw Mason House
- U.S. National Register of Historic Places
- U.S. Historic district – Contributing property
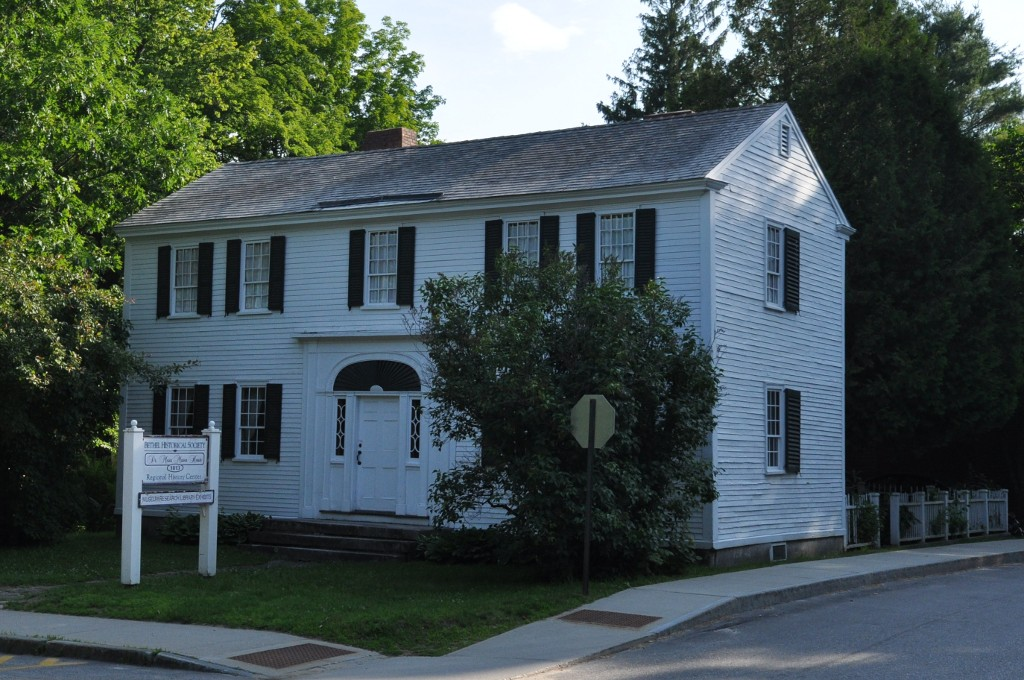

- Location within Maine Location within the United States
- Location: Broad St., Bethel, Maine
- Coordinates: 44°24′18″N 70°47′32″W
- Area: less than one acre
- Built: 1813
- Architectural style: Federal
- Part of: Broad Street Historic District (ID77000078)
- NRHP reference No.: 72000110

Significant dates
- Added to NRHP: October 17, 1972
- Designated CP: December 28, 1977

The Dr. Moses and Agnes Straw Mason House is a historic house museum at the northeast corner of Broad Street and Mason Street in Bethel, Maine. Built c. 1813–15, it is notable as the home of one of Bethel's early doctors and first postmaster, Moses Mason (1789-1866), and for the murals drawn on some of its walls by the itinerant artist (among other professions he engaged) Rufus Porter. The building was listed on the National Register of Historic Places in 1972; it is now owned by the Museums of the Bethel Historical Society, and is open year-round for tours (by appointment only in the colder months).

== Description ==
The Mason House is a 2 1/2-story wood-frame structure, five bays wide and one deep, with two interior chimneys. It stands facing the Bethel Green as one of a number of graceful Federal period houses. The house is finished in white clapboards and rests on a granite foundation. A rear leanto addition extends the house to the rear. The main entrance is centered on the front (west-facing) facade; it features sidelight windows and a broad elliptical fanlight, framed by pilasters and topped by a cornice.

The interior of house has been modernized, but its principal showcase, murals in the central hall and stairwell, have been preserved, as has some of its woodwork. These were painted, probably c. 1830, by the itinerant artist Rufus Porter, and show harbor and woodland scenes typical of his work.

Dr. Moses Mason, for whom the house was built c. 1813, was apprenticed to a local doctor before beginning his practice. He served as Bethel's first postmaster, and as a town selectman, trustee of the Gould Academy, and as a two-term representative in the United States Congress. After his death the house passed to Ada Durrell, a daughter of cousins, who the Masons had raised. Her descendants gave the house to the Museums of the Bethel Historical Society in 1971.

The society now maintains the property as a historic house museum, open for regular tours in the summer and by appointment at other times.

== See also ==
- National Register of Historic Places listings in Oxford County, Maine
