= Thomas Holt (American architect) =

American architect

- Born: 1835; Bethel, Maine, U.S.
- Died: November 9, 1889 (aged 53 or 54); San Francisco, California, U.S.
- Resting place: Woodland Cemetery, Bethel, Maine
- Occupation: Architect

Thomas Holt (1835–1889) was an American architect active in the second half of the 19th century.

== Life and career ==
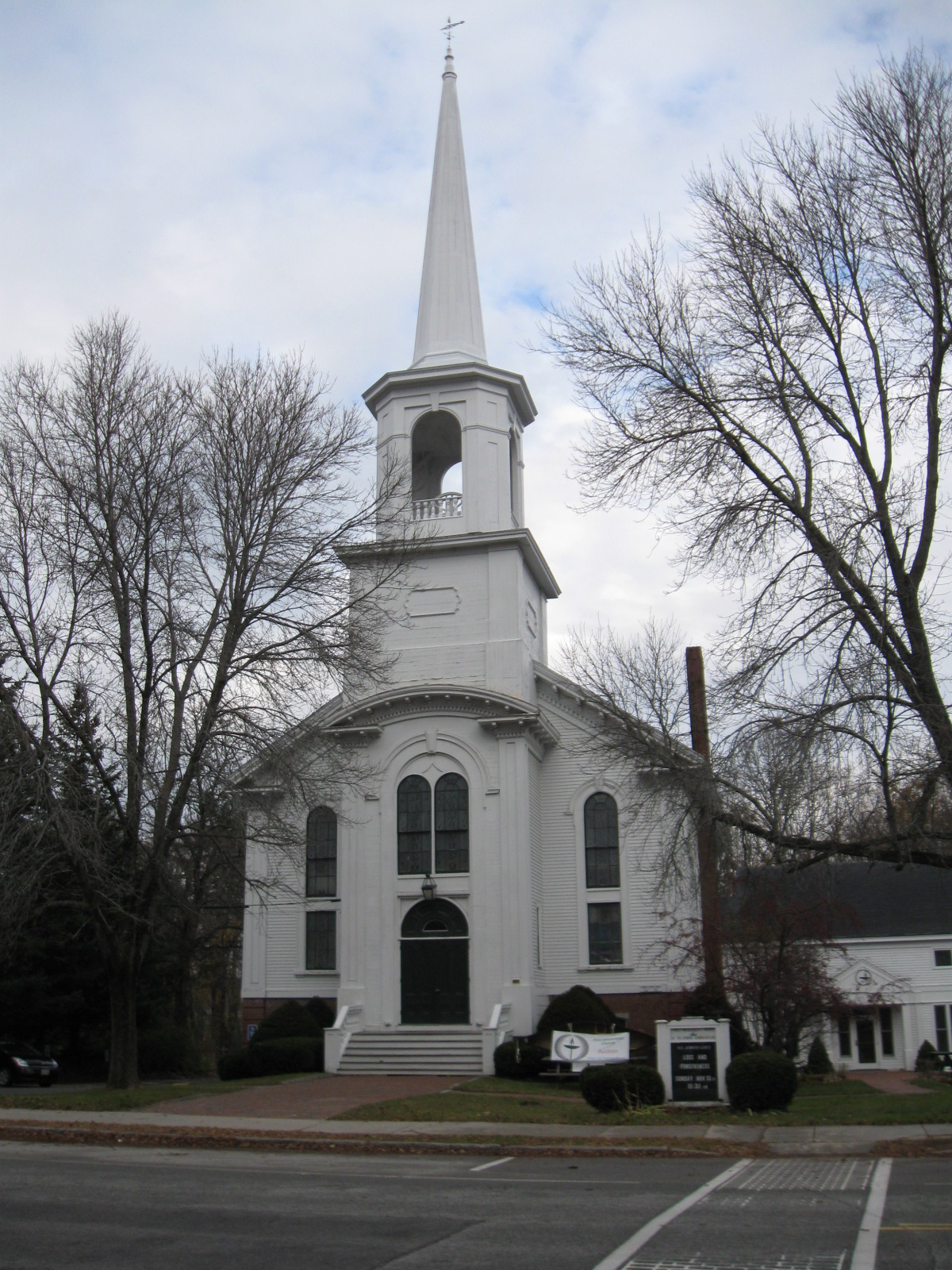
Central Parish Church in Yarmouth, Maine, one of Holt's designs

Holt was born in Bethel, Maine, in 1835, to carpenter Jacob D. Holt (1807–1865) and Hannah White (1794–1892). He graduated from Gould Academy in Bethel.

It is believed that Holt established a firm with contractors Moses C. Foster and Cyrus Buck, but had started out on his own by 1857, for he was advertising his services in the Bethel Courier. Buck died in the Civil War in 1865, aged 24 or 25, while fighting for the Union Army.

In 1860, Holt designed the Central Parish Church in Yarmouth, Maine, which still stands on the town's Main Street, at the head of Portland Street, and is now on the National Register of Historic Places. It is one of only four surviving examples of his work on churches in Maine.

Between 1871 and 1876, he served as chief engineer of the Maine Central Railroad, for whom he designed bridges and buildings, in addition to undertaking surveys for potential new lines.

In 1876, he moved to California, where he continued in architecture but also branched into mining and lumbering.

=== Death ===
Holt died while in the western United States on November 9, 1889, with sources saying it was either after catching pneumonia in a blizzard in Nevada or while in San Francisco, California.

== Selected notable works ==
- Central Parish Church, Yarmouth, Maine (1860)
- Portland and Kennebec railway station, Augusta, Maine (1865)
