= Gehring Clinic =

Historic building in Maine, United States

- U.S. National Register of Historic Places
- U.S. Historic district – Contributing property
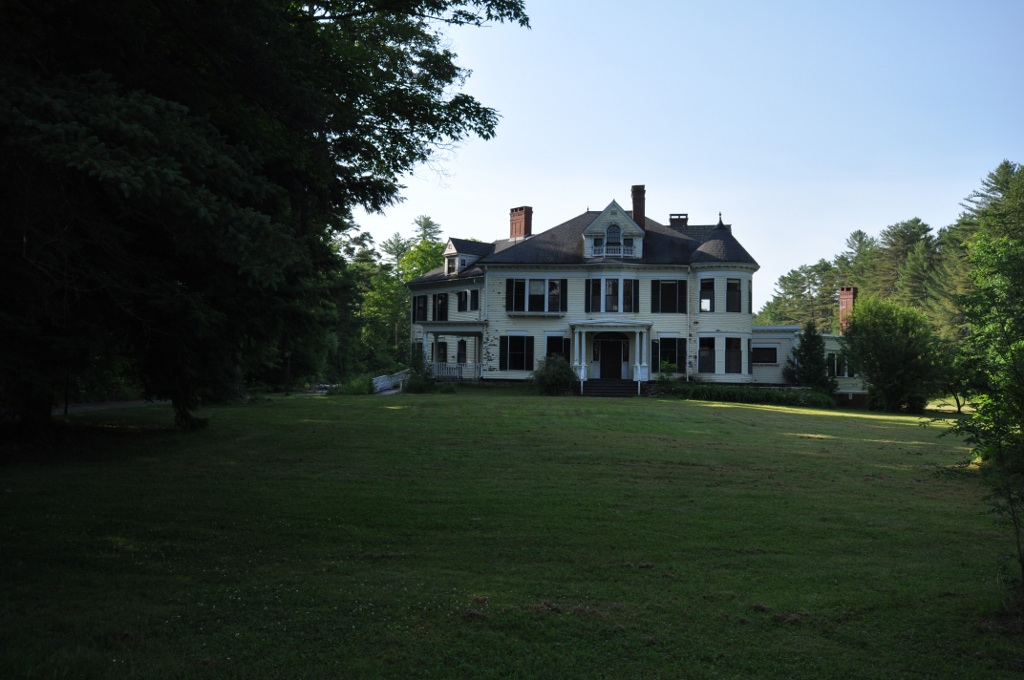

- Location within Maine Location within the United States
- Location: At the south end of Broad Street, Bethel, Maine
- Coordinates: 44°23′58″N 70°47′16″W
- Area: 2 acres (0.81 ha)
- Built: 1896
- Architectural style: Colonial Revival, Queen Anne
- Part of: Broad Street Historic District (ID77000078)
- NRHP reference No.: 76000105

Significant dates
- Added to NRHP: August 2, 1976
- Designated CP: December 28, 1977

The Gehring Clinic is a historic house and medical facility at the south end of Broad Street Historic District in Bethel, Maine. Built in 1896 for Doctor John George Gehring, it is a fine local example of Queen Anne architecture. It is recognized, however, for its association with Gehring, a nationally known psychotherapist who was an early proponent of the use of hypnosis to treat nervous disorders. Gehring opened his large home as a rest home for those who traveled to Bethel to receive his treatment. The property was listed on the National Register of Historic Places in 1976.

== Description and history ==
The Gehring House is a 2 1/2-story wood-frame house with a rambling structure. Its main block is rectangular, with two large ells extending from its rear at angles. The main (northern) facade is divided into three bays, with a centered entrance sheltered by a portico supported by Ionic columns. The entry is flanked by sidelight windows and topped by a wide fanlight of frosted glass. The facade is asymmetrically fenestrated, with two windows in the left bay and one in the right on the first level, and rounded bay windows in the center and left bays on the second level, with a single sash window in the right bay. A round turreted projecting section is attached to the house at the northwest corner, two stories in height and topped by a conical roof.

The eastern of the two rear wings served as a service ell, while that on the west side was where Doctor Gehring had his office and saw his patients. The two wings frame a lawn area that the doctor landscaped, and where, along with much of the rest of the property and parts of Broad Street, he engaged in his hobby of gardening.

The Gehrings moved to Bethel in 1887. Gehring, a medical doctor by training, had had to abandon a career as a surgeon due to a nervous disorder. He learned of the activities of Dr. Frederick Gerrish, based at Bowdoin College, who advocated the use of hypnosis in the treatment of such problems. After studying the methods with Gerrish in Portland, Gehring received the treatment himself, and was cured. He returned to Bethel and began offering the treatment from the clinic in his home. He and his wife opened their home to patients, housing as many as fourteen at a time while they received treatment. The Bethel Inn Resort was built in 1913 with funding from his patients and dedicated to him. Dr. Gehring retired from practice in 1925 and died in 1932. The property has since seen use as a medical facility, but is presently (2014) vacant. Construction vehicles and a construction fence were on the property July 4, 2024. It appeared that deferred maintenance was being tended to on the building.

== See also ==
- National Register of Historic Places listings in Oxford County, Maine
