= List of Gould Academy buildings =

This is a list of buildings at Gould Academy.

== List of Buildings ==
Building	Image	Constructed	Notes	Reference
Bingham Hall		1921	Originally constructed as a gym, and renovated in 1963 as an auditorium.	
Davidson Hall		1971	Boys Dormitory	??
Gehring Hall		1927	Extensively renovated in 1998 to house the Girls Dormitory and Faculty Apartments	
Ordway Hall		1998	Dining hall and other conference rooms	
Farnsworth Fieldhouse		1941	The Farnsworth Field House is a multi-purpose complex with a basketball court, a fitness and weight-training center, an athletic training room, a trampoline room, an indoor skate park, two tennis courts, and a team room.	
Owen Art Gallery		??	Exhibit and workspace	?
Hanscom Hall		1933	Sanborn Family Library, classrooms, Office of the President	
Holden Hall		1939	Boys Dormitory, named in memory of Liberty Emery Holden, class of 1853 and offices of the On-Snow Competition Programs.	
McLaughlin Science Center		2002	The McLaughlin Science Center features a 56-seat auditorium, five lab classrooms, an on-site ground water testing system, two computer labs, a network systems center, a seminar room, and a greenhouse.	
Walters Infirmary		1955	Student Health Center	
Carolyn Wight Admissions Office			Admissions Offices	?
Headmaster's House		??	Home of the Headmaster, renovated in 2012	??
Park-Mason Alumni House		??	Development Office, Business Office, and Alumni Relations	??
Maintenance and Bike Barn		??	Maintenance and Physical Plant, as well as the headquarters of the renowned Gould Academy Cycling Team	??
John V. Smith Working Farm Facility		??	Student and faculty operated barn.	??
