= John George Gehring =

American physician and entomologist

- Born: 4 July 1857; Cleveland, Ohio, U.S.
- Died: 13 September 1932 (aged 75); Bethel, Maine, U.S.
- Education: Case Western Reserve University (MD 1885), Humboldt University of Berlin (Doctor of Science 1891)
- Medical career
- Profession: Physician, neurologist
- Institutions: Gehring Clinic
- Sub-specialties: Neurology, Psychotherapy, Hypnotherapy

John George Gehring (4 July 1857 - 1 September 1932) was an American medical doctor who specialised in neurology.

Gehring was educated at Western Reserve University [now Case Western Reserve University] and earned his M.D. in 1885. He later gained a Doctorate of Science from Berlin University, while living and travelling in Europe after his marriage to Marian True Farnsworth in 1888.

Upon returning to the United States, Gehring ran a clinic from his home town in Bethel, Maine, where he treated patients suffering from Psychiatric disorders.

Gehring's clinic provided treatment regimens including outdoor activities like gardening and swimming. Gehring attracted patients from upper-class New York Society and Harvard University.

In 1976 as an individual house, and in 1977 as part of a broader historic district in Bethel, the Gehring Clinic was nominated to the US National Register of Historic places.

== Other pursuits ==
Gehring was a naturalist, with a particular interest in Coleoptera (beetles) and published one paper, a note in The Canadian Entomologist XIV (1881) describing how he had uncovered a habitat of the water penny beetle species Psephenus lecontei at Niagara. Gehring is listed in the Naturalist's Directory of the United States and Canada for 1895, in the Entomologists section.

The beetle genus name Gehringia (Carabidae) was named in honour of Gehring by Philip Jackson Darlington Jr. in 1933. In his paper describing the new Genus and its only species, Gehringia olympica, Darlington named Gehring as an entomological correspondent and friend.

The botanist Henri François Pittier (1857-1950) dedicated his 1885 book The Flora of Pays d'Enhaut, (Switzerland) to his friend Gehring in memory of 'the happy time we once spent together on the wide sea.'

== Select publications ==
- Gehring, J. Geo.: Psephenus lecontei, The Canadian Entomologist, volume XIV, number 1, pages 72-73 (1882)
- Gehring, J.G. (communicated by): Elephantiasis arabum cured by ligature of the femoral artery by G.C.E. Weber, M.D. of Cleveland, O. (reported by J.G.Gehring), The American Journal of the Medical Sciences, pages 164-170 (January 1884)
