= Ronan Donovan =

American conservation photographer

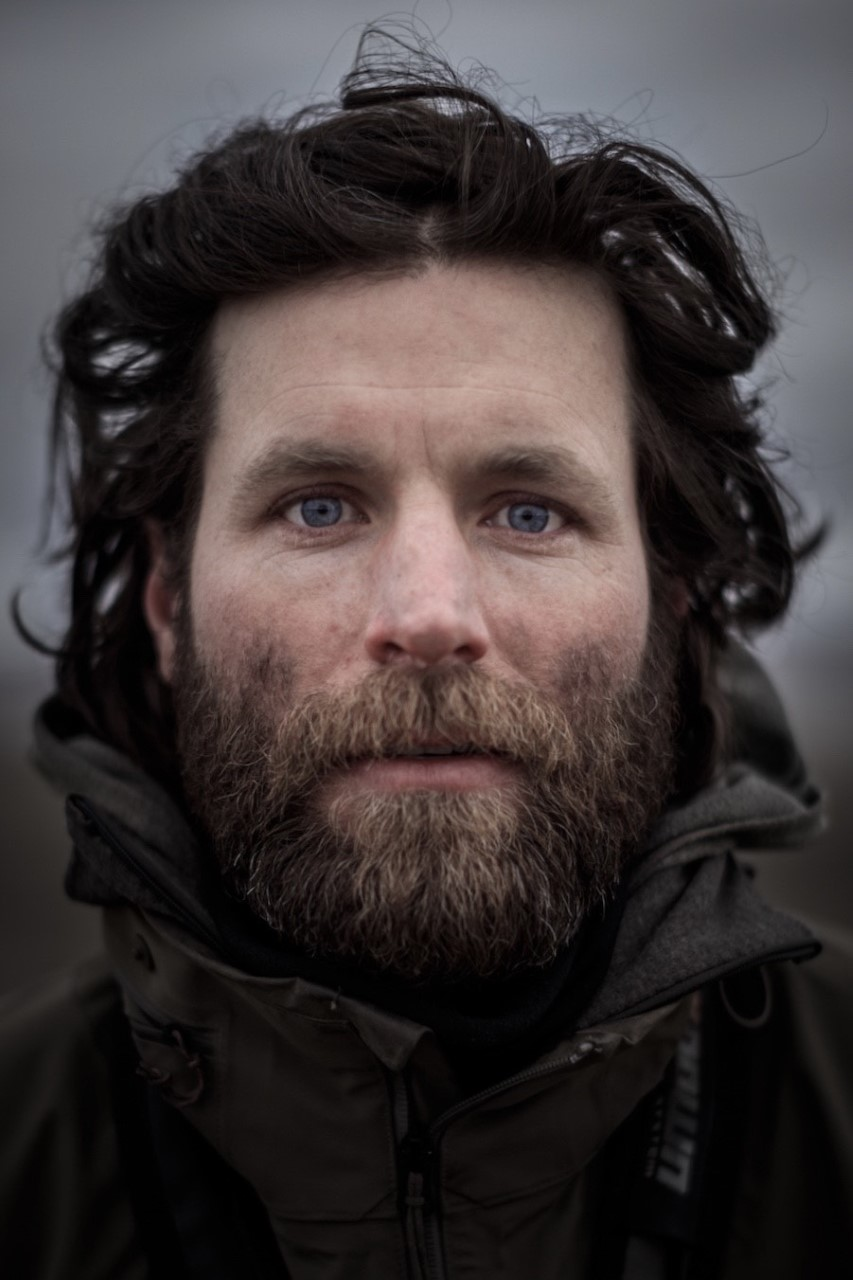
- Born: Vermont
- Education: University of New Hampshire at Durham
- Occupation: Conservation photographer
- Known for: Kingdom of the White Wolf, National Geographic Magazine.
- Website: https://ronandonovan.com/

Ronan Donovan is a conservation photographer, filmmaker, wildlife biologist, and National Geographic Explorer and Storytelling Fellow.

== Early life ==
Ronan Donovan was born in rural Vermont in a cabin built by his parents. He attended Gould Academy, a boarding school in Bethel, Maine for grades 10–12, and went on to earn a Bachelor's of Science in International Business and Economics with a minor in Environmental Conservation from the University of New Hampshire at Durham.

After graduating college, Ronan interviewed with a Boston finance firm. The firm offered him a job but Ronan turned the position down opting instead to accept a wildlife biology position in Yosemite National Park. He would spend 2006 in the national park catching, banding, and monitoring spotted owls. Prior to leaving the east coast for his job in Yosemite, Ronan purchased his first camera. During his season working in the park, he shot film and kept a journal of each frame with their corresponding camera settings.

After his work in Yosemite, Ronan took a job on an oil exploration ship that mapped the ocean floor for potential oil and gas reserves. His job, while on board, was to monitor and document marine mammals and sea turtles that could have been negatively affected by oil extraction activities and to call for a shutdown of the seismic survey if marine mammals or turtles came too close.

Ronan continued to teach himself photography throughout his early assignments as a wildlife biologist. It was his camera, alongside his work experience in and with nature, that would lead Ronan to dedicate himself to visual storytelling.

== Career ==
The foundation for Ronan's career as a conservation photographer was solidified in 2011 when he had the opportunity to study and document the lives of wild chimpanzees for Harvard University professor Dr. Richard Wrangham. It was during this assignment in Kibale National Park that Ronan began to think differently about the photographs he was taking. He recognized the importance of capturing landscape, setting, interaction, and relationship alongside the individual subjects of his photographs. It was context, Ronan recognized, that allowed an image tell a story.

The research images he collected in Uganda eventually caught the attention of Kathy Moran, a senior natural history editor for National Geographic Magazine. In 2014, Moran met with Ronan in Washington D.C. and asked him to assist career photojournalist Michael ‘Nick’ Nichols on a major National Geographic project commemorating the 100th anniversary of the National Park Service in the United States that focused on the first US National Park - Yellowstone National Park.

Ronan would spend the next year-and-a-half working inside of Yellowstone National Park, collaborating with Michael Nichols and the Yellowstone Wolf Project, documenting the lives of Yellowstone gray wolves. Several of Ronan’s images, taken during the course of this project, were selected for publishing in the May 2016 issue of National Geographic—a special issue dedicated to the park, titled “Yellowstone: America’s Wild Idea.” His image, depicting three gray wolves feeding on a bison carcass in a snowstorm, went on to be selected for National Geographic's 52 Best Images of 2016—a contest, “curated from 91 photographers, 107 stories, and 2,290,225 photographs.” Another of Ronan's wolf images, a photo of a lone wolf standing in the Yellowstone River over a bison carcass, was selected as part of a photo exhibit by National Geographic titled Greatest Wildlife Photographs.

After documenting the wolves of Yellowstone National Park, Ronan went on to study the arctic wolves on Ellesmere Island in north-eastern Canada. His work there earned him another National Geographic feature titled “Alone With Wolves” that was published in the magazine's September 2019 issue.

Donovan's work in the arctic expanded his medium to include filmmaking. In August 2019, his first documentary series, Kingdom Of The White Wolf, documenting his time living amongst wolves on Ellesmere Island released. His film work has since gone on to be published by National Geographic, PBS's Nature and BBC.

== Awards ==
- 2020 - POYi Science & Natural History - Picture Story | Award of Excellence
- 2017 - Accepted into The Photo Society of National Geographic
- 2017 - PDN's 30 New and Emerging Photographers to Watch
- 2016 - National Geographic's 52 best images of the year
- 2016 - 2 x Finalist - Wildlife Photographer of the Year
- 2014 - Became a full-time professional photographer
- 2014 - Finalist - Big Picture Competition
- 2013 - Highly Honored - Nature's Best Photography

== Photography ==
- Wolves: Photography by Ronan Donovan. National Museum of Wildlife Art. 2022–23.
- Alone With Wolves. National Geographic. September, 2019.
- Black Rosy Finch: As the Rockies Melt, This Rare Nesting Bird Will Have Nowhere to Go. Audubon Magazine. Summer 2019.
- The Gorillas Dian Fossey Saved. National Geographic. September, 2017.
- Yellowstone Wolves. National Geographic. May, 2016. Volume 229, No. 5.

== Documentary ==
Kingdom Of The White Wolf. National Geographic. Market Road Films. August 25, 2019.

== Speaking ==
Documenting and Living with Arctic Wolves. Story Tellers Summit. National Geographic Society. 2020.

Communicating Empathy Through Visual Storytelling. WWF Fuller Symposium. 2017.
