= Central Parish Church =

Historic church in Maine, United States

- U.S. National Register of Historic Places
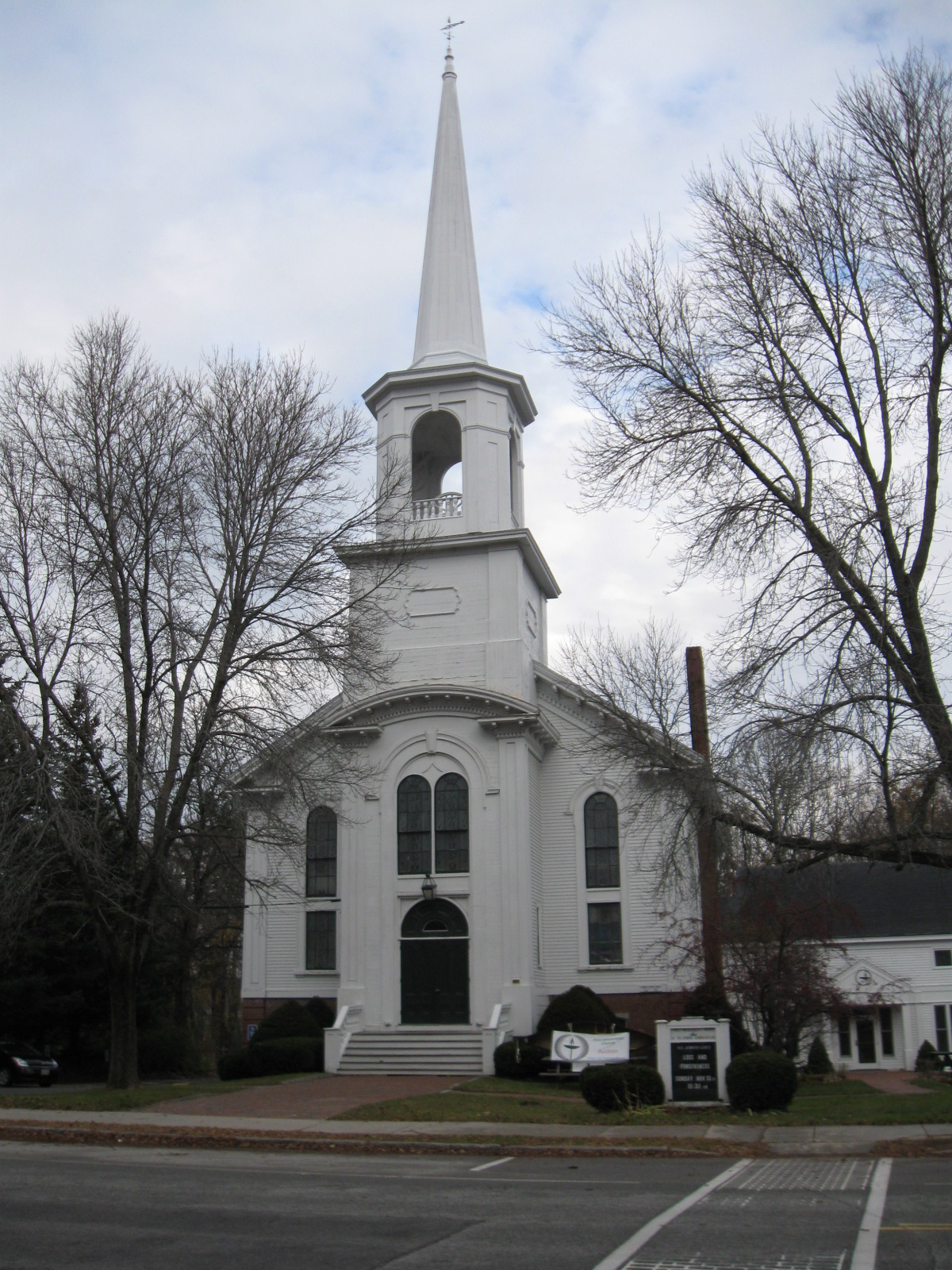

- Location within Maine Location within the United States
- Location: 97 Main St., Yarmouth, Maine
- Coordinates: 43°47′57″N 70°10′58″W
- Area: less than one acre
- Built: 1859
- Architect: Thomas Holt
- Architectural style: Italianate
- NRHP reference No.: 88000892
- Added to NRHP: June 23, 1988

The First Universalist Church, also once known as the Central Parish Church, is a historic church at 97 Main Street in Yarmouth, Maine. Built in 1859–60, it is an excellent local example of religious Italianate architecture, and one of the state's few surviving churches designed by architect Thomas Holt. It was listed on the National Register of Historic Places in 1988. The congregation was founded in 1859, and is affiliated with the Unitarian Universalist Association; its current minister is Rev. Hillary Collins-Gilpatrick.

== Description and history ==
The First Universalist Church is set in the center of Yarmouth, on the north side of Main Street, east of the North Yarmouth Academy and opposite Portland Street. It is a rectangular wood-frame structure, with a front-facing gable roof, clapboard and flushboard exterior, and a high brick foundation. A square section projects from the front facade, supporting a multistage tower and housing the main entrance. The entrance is set in a tall pilastered arch that also includes a pair of round-arch windows above. This stage of the tower has a rounded gable with modillioned eave, the latter detail also extended to the main roof. A plainly-pilastered square section tops this, with an eight-sided belfry above that has four round-arch openings. The tower is capped by an octagonal steeple. Windows on either side of the projecting section are two-port narrow windows, the upper section with a rounded arch top. Round-arch windows are also found on the building sides.

The church was built in 1859–60, and is one of four known surviving church designs in the state of Thomas Holt, an architect from Bethel, Maine. The congregation was established in 1859 by a split from the local Universalist congregation. After 1885 the congregation declined, most of its members returning to the mother congregation. The two congregations merged soon afterward, at which time the name "Central Parish Church" was adopted. In 1920 it took the name "First Universalist Church", which it retained after merging with the Unitarian congregation in 1962.

== See also ==
- National Register of Historic Places listings in Cumberland County, Maine
