= West Bethel, Maine =

- Village
- Location within Maine
- Coordinates: 44°24′07″N 70°51′40″W
- Country: United States
- State: Maine
- County: Oxford
- Elevation: 682 ft (208 m)
- Time zone: UTC-5 (Eastern (EST))
  - Summer (DST): UTC-4 (EDT)
- ZIP code: 04286
- Area code: State: 207 . Local: 836.
- GNIS feature ID: 581258

West Bethel is an unincorporated village in the town of Bethel, Oxford County, Maine, United States. The community is located along U.S. Route 2 and the Androscoggin River, 21 miles (34 km) northwest of Paris. West Bethel has an active post office, which was opened January 12, 1837. The post office was originally located in the store on the corner of Flat Road. West Bethel has its own ZIP code, 04286.
