= Museums of the Bethel Historical Society =

Museums of the Bethel Historical Society, Bethel, Maine
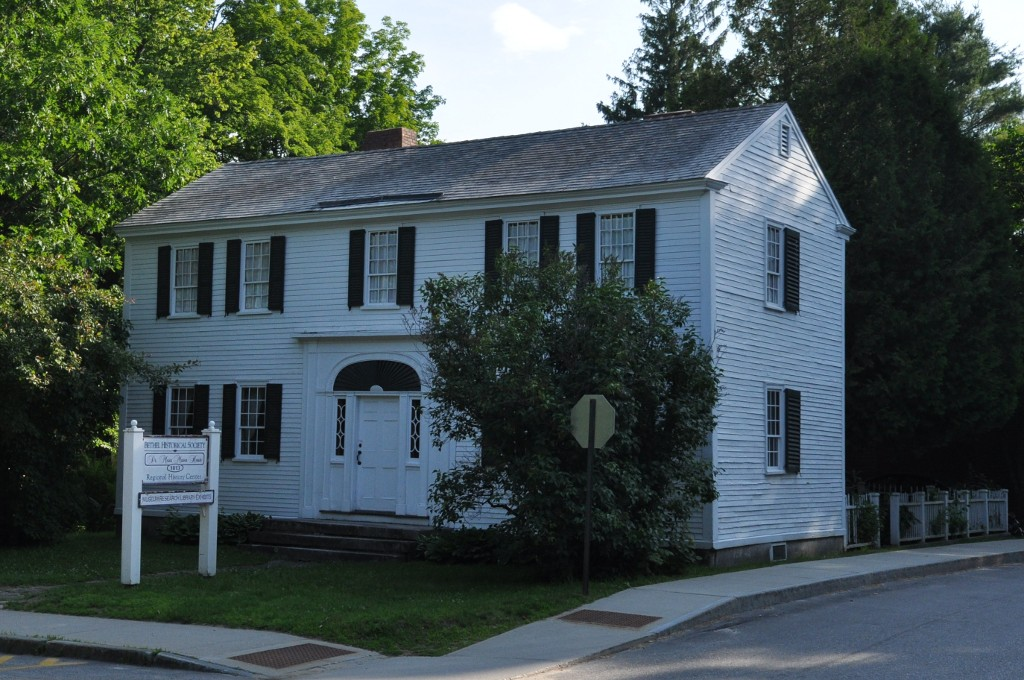
- The Society's Dr. Moses Mason House museum
- Established: 1966
- Location: 10 Broad Street, Bethel, Maine 04217
- Founder: Eva Bean
- Director: William F. Chapman
- Website: www.bethelhistorical.org

The Museums of the Bethel Historical Society is a regional historical society and historical museum located in Bethel, Maine. The museum occupies two buildings in Bethel's Broad Street Historic District, the 1821 O'Neil and Betsey Straw Robinson House and the 1813 Dr. Moses and Agnes Straw Mason House. The museum focuses on preserving and interpreting the history of western Maine and the White Mountain region of Maine and New Hampshire.

== History ==
The society was founded as the Bethel Historical Society on May 31, 1966 at a meeting at the Bethel Library Association. Eighteen individuals gathered for that first meeting, including Eva Bean, the author of East Bethel Road, who became the secretary and is considered by the society to be its founder. One of the earliest presidents of the society was Margaret Joy Tibbetts, the United States Ambassador to Norway from 1964 to 1969. Early financial support for the society was provided by the William Bingham II Trust for Charity, which funded the restoration of the Dr. Moses Mason House and awarded it to the society in 1974. With support from the Bingham Trustees and others, the society was able to hire its first paid staff member, curator Dr. Stanley R. Howe Phd. Continued support over the years have enabled the society's gradual transition from a small, single-town historical society to a regionally-focused history museum.

== Collections ==
As a regional historical museum, the Museums of the Bethel Historical Society collect for the broader Bethel area, including all of western Maine and the White Mountain region of Maine and New Hampshire. In addition to the museum's artifact collections, the society maintains a research library collection featuring books, pamphlets, diaries, letters, photographs, maps, atlases, gazetteers, scrapbooks, periodicals, audio/video recordings, microforms, and ephemera. Since 2014, the Society has also been responsible for the preservation and care of the archives of nearby Gould Academy. A large grant received in 2015 allowed the society to undertake a major expansion to its research library and collection storage space, and in the same year the society hired its first librarian and archivist.

== Programs and exhibitions ==
The museum hosts a wide variety of programs for all ages and interests. Past exhibitions have documented the life of Molly Ockett, a local Native American woman; the history of the Grange in Maine; and Maine's skiing heritage. The museum frequently features exhibitions of White Mountain art, which have included works by prominent masters of the school including Benjamin Champney, Aaron Draper Shattuck, and others, as well as the works of contemporary artists. Among the most popular programs is the annual community picnic and concert, a free concert by the Portland Brass quartet held outside on the society's lawn every Fourth of July.
