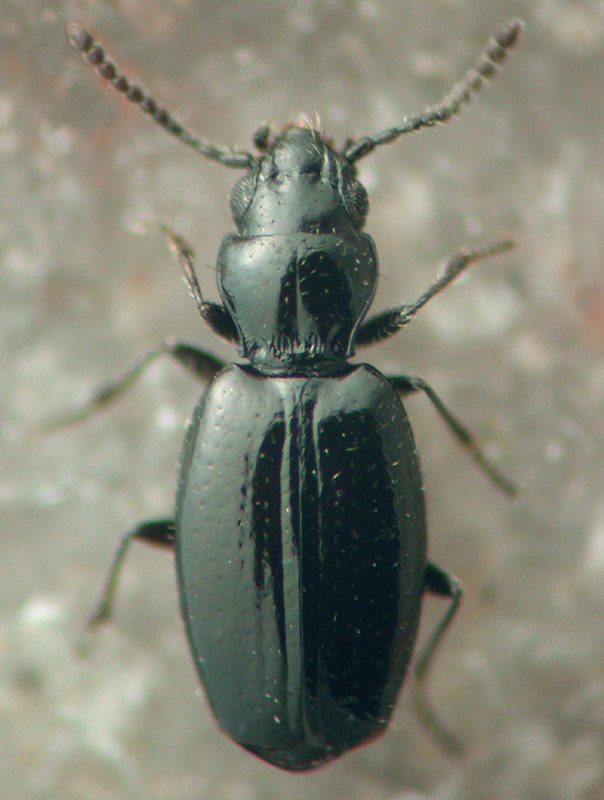

Scientific classification
- Kingdom: Animalia
- Phylum: Arthropoda
- Clade: Pancrustacea
- Class: Insecta
- Order: Coleoptera
- Suborder: Adephaga
- Family: Carabidae
- Subfamily: Psydrinae
- Tribe: Gehringiini
- Genus: Gehringia; Darlington, 1933
- Species: G. olympica

Binomial name
- Gehringia olympica Darlington, 1933

= Gehringia =

Genus of beetles

Gehringia olympica is a species of ground beetle of the (family Carabidae), and the only species in the genus Gehringia.

It is a rather unusual member of its family, a tiny shiny-black beetle with a few stout bristles, and is not found anywhere outside the Pacific Northwest of North America, from Montana and Oregon in the United States northwards to the North West Territories and Yukon in Canada. It inhabits mountain stream gravel banks and can locally be very common. The relationships of this distinct montane endemic have been long debated; variously, it was assigned to subfamily Psydrinae or Trechinae and here it is treated in the former.

The generic name of this species was coined by Philip Jackson Darlington, Jr. (1904–1983), in honour of his friend the physician John George Gehring (1857–1932).
