= Middle Intervale Meeting House and Common =

Historic church in Maine, United States

- U.S. National Register of Historic Places
- U.S. Historic district
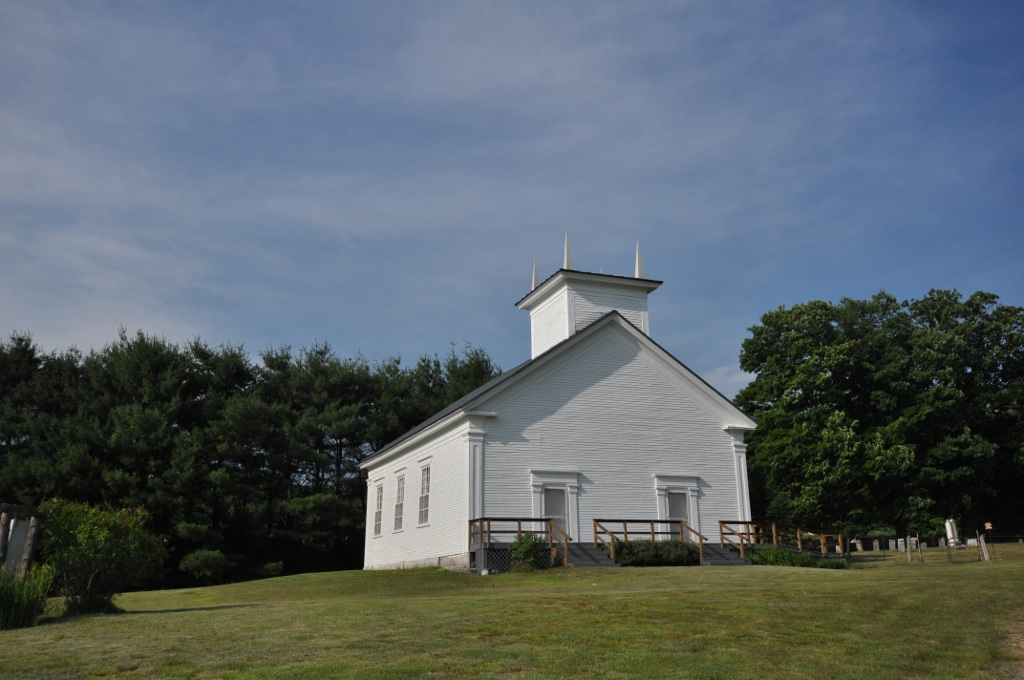

- Location within Maine Location within the United States
- Nearest city: Bethel, Maine
- Coordinates: 44°27′51″N 70°47′11″W
- Area: 2 acres (0.81 ha)
- Built: 1816
- Architectural style: Greek Revival
- NRHP reference No.: 98000721
- Added to NRHP: June 26, 1998

The Middle Intervale Meeting House and Common (Center Meeting House) is a historic church at 757 Intervale Road in Bethel, Maine. Built in 1816, this simple wood-frame structure served as a meeting house for both religious and civic purposes, and has been little-altered since 1857, when it was given its present Greek Revival features. It was listed on the National Register of Historic Places in 1998.

== Description and history ==
The meeting house is a rectangular wood-frame structure, sheathed in clapboards, and resting in a granite foundation. It has a low single-stage square tower with a shallow pyramidal roof, with spirelets at its corners. The main facade is unadorned, the gable ends only having short returns. It lacks windows, and has two symmetrically placed identical entrances, which are flanked by pilasters and topped by entablatures. The building corners have paneled pilasters, with an entablature running below the roofline along the sides of the building. Each side elevation has three large windows, which are evenly spaced but set toward the rear of the building. The rear elevation, like the front, has no windows. The building is located at the northeast corner of the common, a 2-acre (0.81 ha) grassy area.

The front entrances lead into a vestibule area, from which doorways lead into the nave, and a stairway leads to a now-closed gallery. The nave is populated with box pews that have Federal style woodwork. The pulpit is located in the southeast corner, framed by a monumental Greek Revival entablature and pilasters. Window and other trim is modest, and the walls and cove ceiling are plastered.

The building was built in 1816 to house Baptist and Congregationalist congregations, and to provide a location for town meetings. When built, it apparently had a tall tower with spire, two rows of windows, and the gallery was accessed by an outside staircase located between the two entrances. In 1825 the windows were altered to their present configuration, and the box pews were installed. The building was given its Greek Revival features in 1857, along with the inside gallery staircase and the tower. The building was used by both congregations and the town until about 1857, after which it was used exclusively by the Baptist congregation.

== See also ==
- National Register of Historic Places listings in Oxford County, Maine
