= Joyce E. Longcore =

Mycologist

Joyce E. Longcore is a mycologist and an associate research professor at the University of Maine. She is most well known for first culturing and describing Batrachochytrium dendrobatidis which is a species of Chytridiomycota fungi that was the first to be known to attack vertebrates. She continues to collect and isolate Chytridiomycota cultures for other researches to use for their own studies.

== Education ==
In 1960, Longcore received her B.S. in Biology from the University of Michigan. and then worked under Dr. Frederick K. Sparrow for a year as a postgraduate. Advised by Dr. Robert Johns, former PhD student of Sparrow, she then earned a M.A. from Indiana University in 1963. Longcore then went back to the University of Michigan to work for Sparrow before marrying and becoming a full-time mother to her two sons. Nearly 20 years later in 1984, Longcore entered graduate school at the University of Maine with Dr. Richard Homola, a basidiomycetes expert, and received her PhD in 1991.

== Research ==
Throughout 1996 and into 1997, the National Zoological Park in Washington, DC was tracking large scale die offs of poison dart frogs due to an unknown skin disease. The Zoo sent Longcore electron micrographs that had been taken of the diseased frogs' skin and she recognised them to be Chytridiomycota. Up until that point Chytridiomycota had only ever been observed as saprotrophs or parasites of microscopic organisms, not vertebrates. This discovery led to the research that Longcore and her colleges would publish in 1999 describing this species of chytrid, Batrachochytrium dendrobatidis.

== Awards & honors ==
In 2012, Longcore was elected as a fellow to the American Association for the Advancement of Science. In 2017, Longcore, along with colleagues Elaine Lamirande, Don Nichols, and Allan Pessier, received The Golden Goose Award for isolating and describing Batrachochytrium dendrobatidis. In 2022, Longcore received the honor of Distinguished Mycologist from the Mycological Society of America.
