= Gould Academy =

Private prep school in Bethel, Maine, US

Location
- 39 Church Street; Bethel, Maine 04217; United States
- 44.40684°N 70.79254°W

Information
- School type: Private, boarding
- Established: 1836; 190 years ago
- Head of school: Tao Smith ’90, P’23, ’28
- Grades: Grades 9-12, Postgraduate and Winter Term for Grades 7-8
- Enrollment: 210
- Student to teacher ratio: 6:1
- Campus size: 436 acres
- Campus type: Rural
- Colors: Blue; White
- Athletics conference: NEPSAC
- Mascot: Husky
- Nickname: Huskies
- Yearbook: Academy Herald
- Tuition: "Tuition and Financial Aid". = Boarding Students: $75,324; Day Students: $54,848
- Website: www.gouldacademy.org

Gould Academy is a private, co-ed, college preparatory boarding and day school founded in 1836 and located in the small town of Bethel, Maine, United States.

== History ==
In 1835 citizens of Bethel, Maine, formed an organization as trustees of the Bethel High School. A hall was fitted up for a schoolroom, and N. T. True was employed as principal. Encouraged by their success, the trustees reorganized and obtained a charter for an Academy, which by act of the Legislature on January 27, 1836, was incorporated as Bethel Academy. A building was erected, Isaac Randall was the first instructor, and the school opened for its first term on the second Wednesday of September, 1836.

Bethel Academy also accepted its first tuition-paying students in 1836, both locals and boarders. Reverend Daniel Gould left his $842 fortune to the school when he died in 1843. Gould stipulated that the school be named for him; from then on it was known as Gould's Academy and eventually Gould Academy.

In 1921, plans to build the Bingham Gymnasium were announced by then president Frank E. Hanscom. In 1933, construction began on Hanscom Hall. In 1936, the Academy earned accreditation by the New England Association of Schools and Colleges.

William Bingham II, who came to Bethel from Cleveland for John George Gehring's medical care, was a major school benefactor from the 1930s to his death in 1955 and thereafter via the Bingham Betterment Fund. Since the town of Bethel lacked a public high school, all local children were educated at Gould until 1969, when Telstar High School opened.

Much of the school's history is preserved by the Museums of the Bethel Historical Society, which has had stewardship of the Gould Academy Archives since 2014.

The Original Gould Hall c. 1890; Hanscom Hall now stands where this building did.

== Academics ==
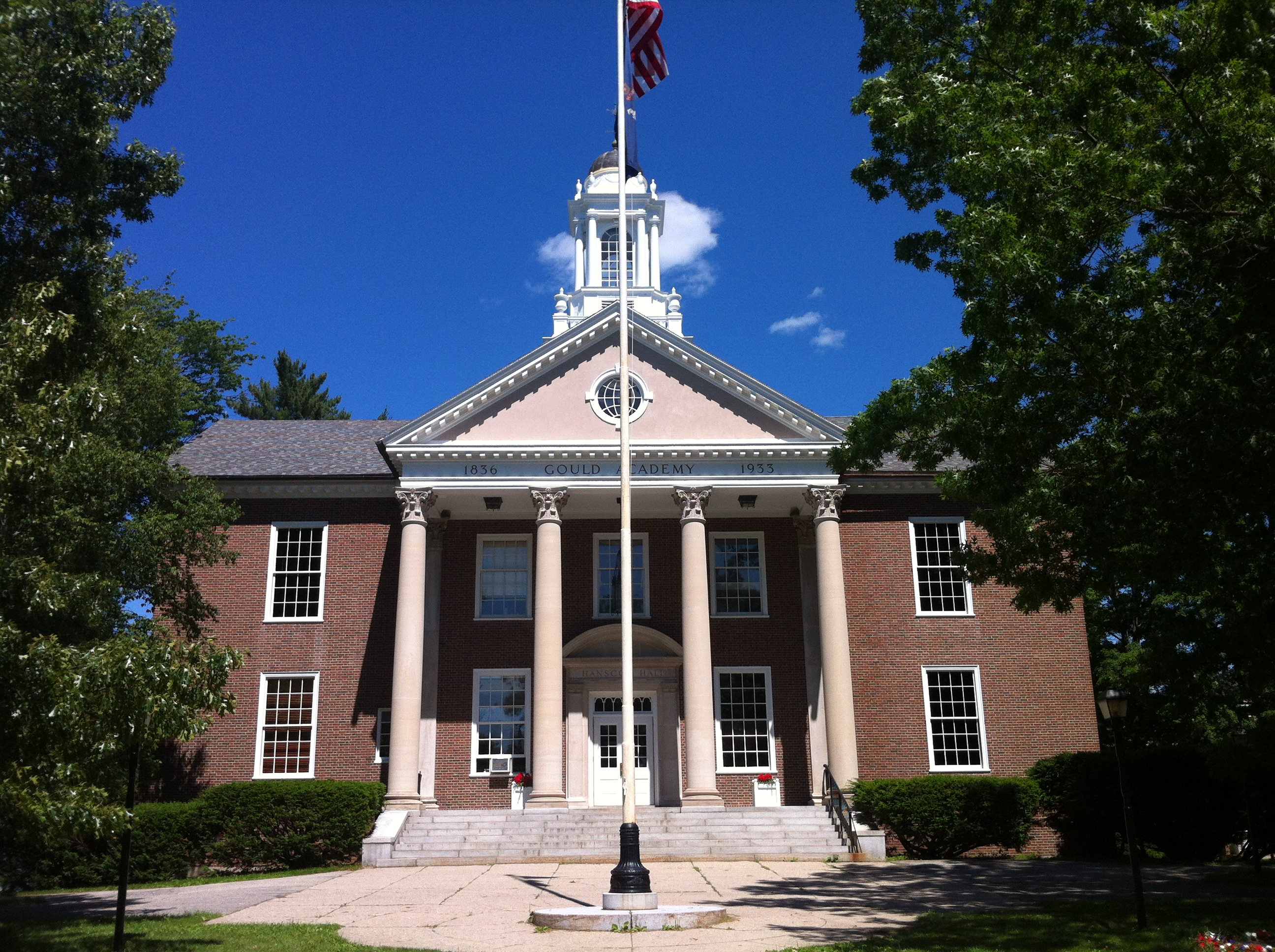
Hanscom Hall contains the library, classrooms, and administrative offices

Gould operates on a semester system, and students typically enroll in five to six courses per semester. Class periods are affectionately known as "dots" (periods), and have a fixed schedule changing between five and four classes a day. The fall and spring term schedules include a half day every week on Wednesday and a late start every Thursday. The Winter term schedule is based on half days Tuesday through Friday to make time for athletics, mainly the On-Snow Competition programs.

== Programming ==
=== Athletics ===
Gould Academy is known for a whole-of-student approach that builds mentally and physically resilient athletes. In 2026, Gould sent three alumni to the Olympics. Additionally, two former US ski team coaches are Gould alumni, several Olympians previously competed in the Olympics, and are highly decorated XGames athletes.

Gould's high school teams compete in the MAISAD league of the New England Preparatory School Athletic Council. Most sports also branch outside of the league and conference. Fall Sports include Cross Country Running, Equestrian, Field Hockey, Golf, Mountain Biking, Soccer, and the Outing Club. Winter Sports include Snowboarding (competitive and varsity level), Alpine Skiing (competitive and varsity level), Freestyle Skiing, Nordic Skiing, All-Mountain Non-Competitive Skiing and Snowboarding, Learn to Ski, Ski Instructor Program, and Ski Patrol. Spring sports are Baseball, Equestrian, Lacrosse, Softball, Tennis, Mountain Biking, and the Outing Club.

=== Competitive Snow Sports ===
Winter class schedules get flipped so athletes spend their mornings at Sunday River and take academic classes after lunch. Flexible academic support for students traveling and competing in the program. There is a winter term option for seventh and eighth grade competitive athletes in alpine and freestyle.

=== Four Point ===
Gould’s Four Point Program is a 40-year-old tradition that starts in ninth grade and ends upon graduation. Every year, just before spring break, students in each class embark on a journey of self-discovery.

== Campus ==
Sanborn Family Library inside Hanscom Hall, renovated in 2011.

Gould's 456 acre campus is located in the town of Bethel, Maine, just on the Western edge of "Bethel Village".

=== Athletic facilities ===
Ordway Hall, Dining Hall at Gould Academy, built in 1998.

Farnsworth Field House: Farnsworth is a multi-purpose complex that is home to Lombard Basketball Court, a fitness and weight-training center, an athletic training room, a trampoline room, an indoor skate park, two tennis courts, and a team room. Outdoors, there are four tennis courts, four full-sized athletic fields, an artificial turf field, baseball and softball diamonds, and an 18-hole golf course at the Bethel Inn Resort.

In the lower level of Ordway Hall is The Lieblein Performance Center and Coaches Offices where students store their equipment for skiing, snowboarding, and mountain biking. The Lieblein performance center is also home to a ski building classroom.

== Gould people ==
=== Headmasters ===
Order	Name	Years	Reference
1	Nathaniel T. True	1835-36	
	William Rogers Chapman		
	Moses Bartlett		
	Abernathy Grover		
	David Hastings		
	Moses Soule	1841-43	
	Nathaniel Tuckerman True	1848-1881	
	David True Timberlake	1881	
	Henry Johnson		
	Frank E. Hanscom	1897–1936	
	Philip Sayles	1936-40	
	Elwood F. Ireland	1940–1947	
	Sidney W. Davidson	1947–1959	
	Edmond Vachon	1959–1967	
	Edward Scheibler	1967	
	Richard Dolven (acting)	1968	
	William P. Clough III	1983–2001	
	Daniel Kunkle	2001–2012	
	Matthew Ruby	2012–2018	
	Chris Gorycki (Interim)	2018–2020	
	Tao Smith	2020–	

=== Notable alumni ===
- Hanna Percy (2025), Olympic snowboarder
- Brianna Schnorrbusch (2024), Olympic snowboarder
- Nathan Pare (2023), Olympic snowboarder
- Troy Murphy (2010), Olympic freestyle skier
- Amelia Brodka (2008), professional skateboarder
- Geo Soctomah Neptune (2006), Passamaquoddy basket maker
- Park Bom (2001), South Korean singer
- Lucas St. Clair (1995), Community Leader
- Matt Bevin (1985), 62nd governor of Kentucky
- Arn Chorn-Pond (1985), Cambodian musician and activist
- Ronan Donovan (2001) National Geographic Explorer
- Richard Dysart (1948), actor
- Edward S. Morse, zoologist
- La Fayette Grover (1838), politician from Oregon
- Robin McKinley (1970), fantasy writer
- Marilyn R. N. Mollicone, botanist
- Margaret Joy Tibbetts (1937), United States Ambassador to Norway
- James S. Wiley (1832), politician

== See also ==
- Education in Maine
