= Bethel, Maine =

Town in Maine, United States

- Town
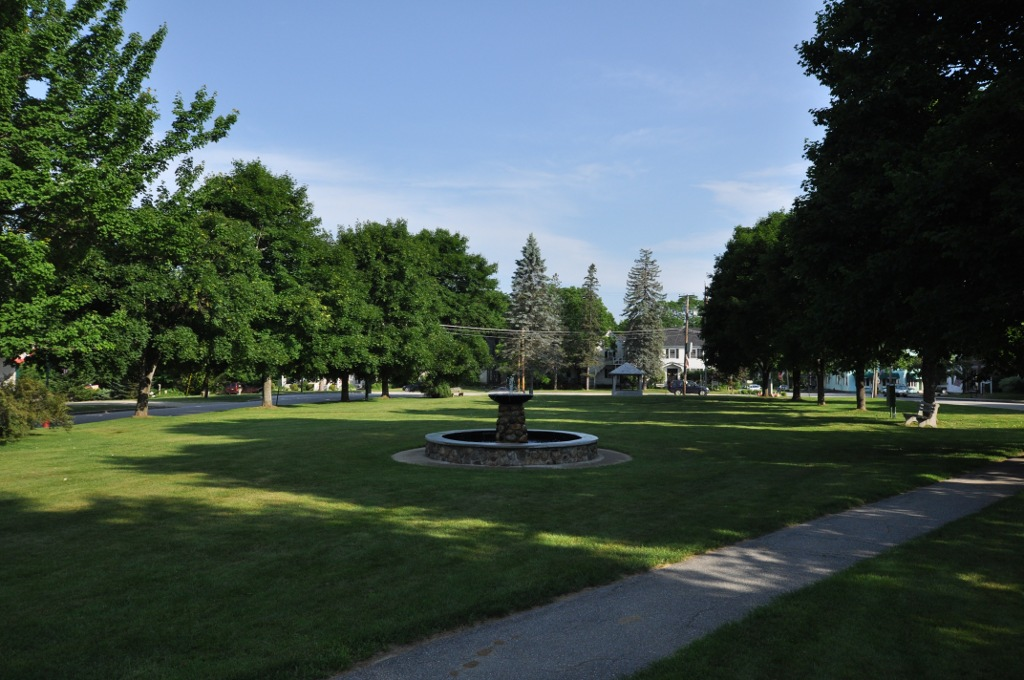
- Bethel Common

- Seal
- Motto: "Maine's Most Beautiful Mountain Village"
- Location within Maine Location within the United States
- Coordinates: 44°24′50″N 70°47′24″W
- Country: United States
- State: Maine
- County: Oxford
- Incorporated: 1796
- Villages: Bethel; East Bethel; Mayville; West Bethel

Area
  - Total: 65.91 sq mi (170.71 km^{2})
  - Land: 64.60 sq mi (167.31 km^{2})
  - Water: 1.31 sq mi (3.39 km^{2})
- Elevation: 817 ft (249 m)

Population (2020)
  - Total: 2,504
  - Density: 39/sq mi (15/km^{2})
- Time zone: UTC-5 (Eastern (EST))
  - Summer (DST): UTC-4 (EDT)
- ZIP Codes: 04217 (Bethel); 04286 (West Bethel); 04219 (Bryant Pond)
- Area code: 207
- FIPS code: 23-04825
- GNIS feature ID: 582352
- Website: www.bethelmaine.org

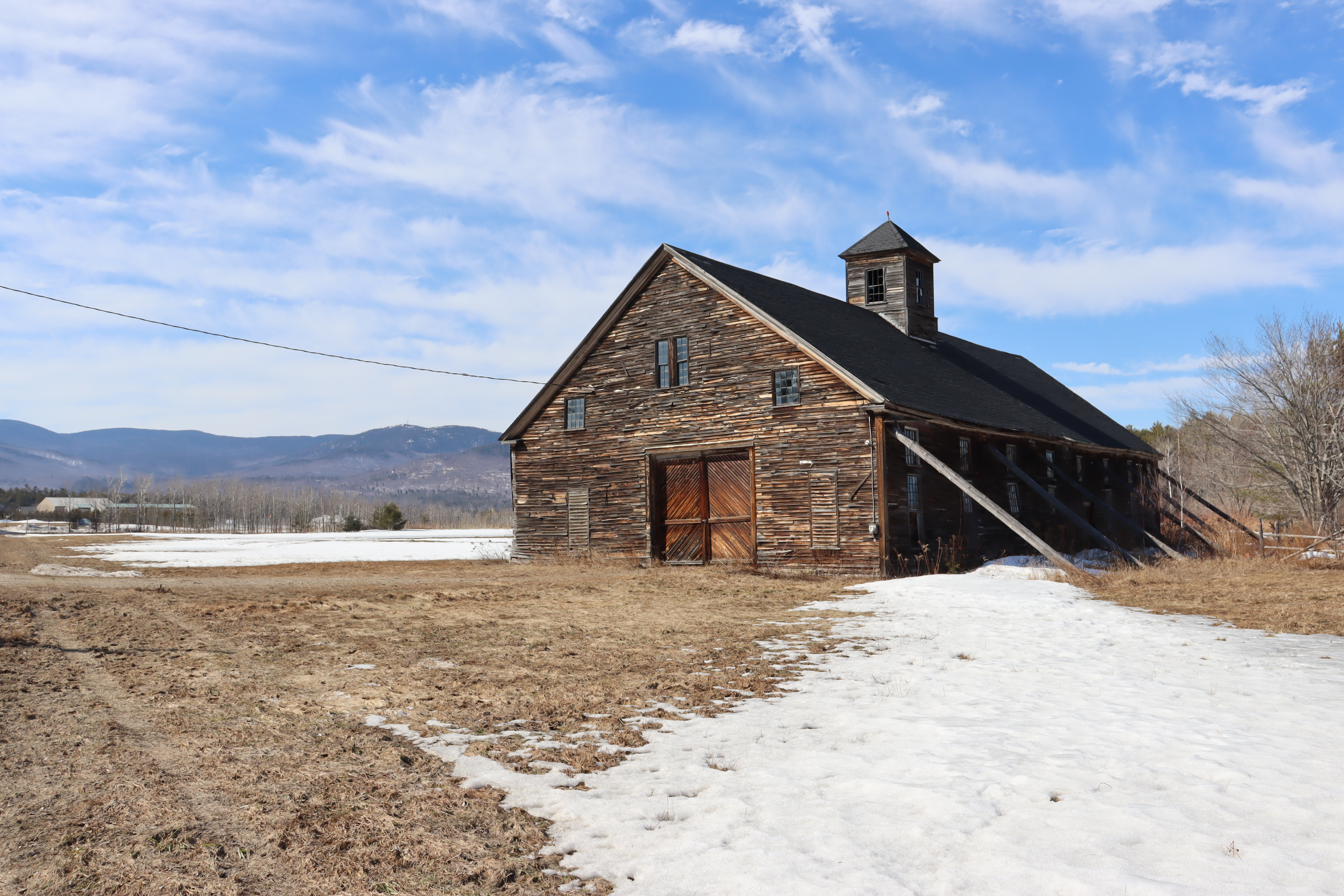
Barn, Bethel, Maine

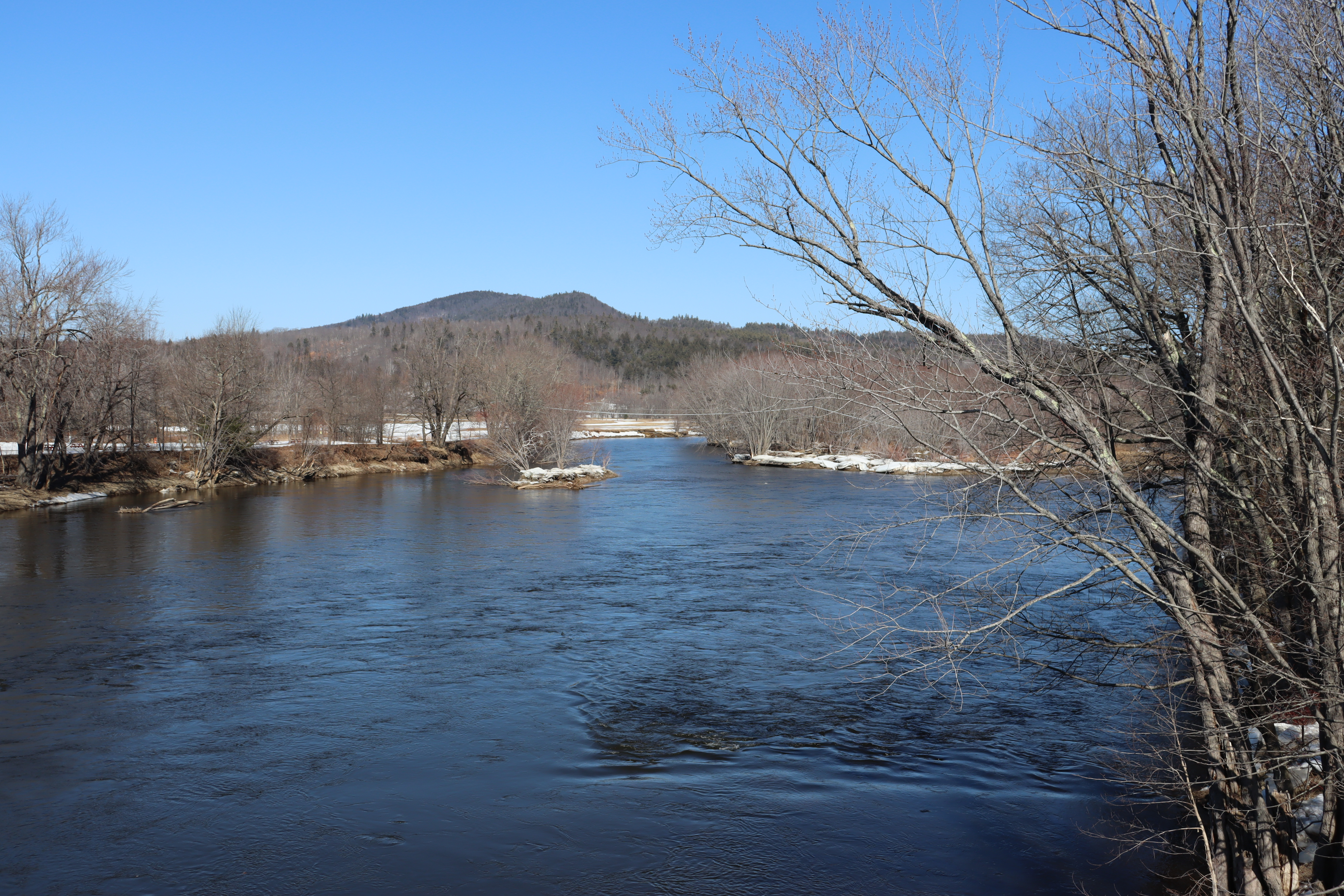
Androscoggin River, late March, Bethel, Maine

Bethel is a town in Oxford County, Maine, United States. The population was 2,504 at the 2020 census. It includes the villages of Bethel and West Bethel. The town is home to Gould Academy, a private preparatory school, and is near the Sunday River ski resort.

== History ==
An Abenaki Indian village was once located on the north side of the Androscoggin River, but had been abandoned before its subsequent English settlement. In 1769, the township was granted as Sudbury-Canada by the Massachusetts General Court to Josiah Richardson of Sudbury, Massachusetts and others (or their heirs) for services at the Battle of Quebec in 1690. It was first settled in 1774 when Nathaniel Segar of Newton, Massachusetts started clearing the land.

The Revolutionary War, however, delayed many grantees from taking up their claims. Only 10 families resided at Sudbury-Canada when it was plundered on August 3, 1781, during the last Indian attack in Maine. Two inhabitants, Benjamin Clark and Nathaniel Segar, were abducted and held captive in Quebec until the war's conclusion, after which the community grew rapidly. On June 10, 1796, Sudbury-Canada Plantation was incorporated as Bethel, the name taken from the Book of Genesis and meaning "House of God."

In 1802, a trade road (now Route 26) was completed from Portland to Errol, New Hampshire, passing through Bethel and bringing growth. More settlers and businesses arrived. Crops were planted on fertile intervales and meadows formerly cultivated by Indians. Bethel became one of the best farming towns in the state, especially for hay and potatoes. In winter, farmers found work logging, with the lumber cut at sawmills operated by water power from streams. Other manufacturers produced flour, leather and harnesses, furniture, boots and shoes, carriages, and marble and granite work. The Bethel House, a large hotel, was built in 1833.

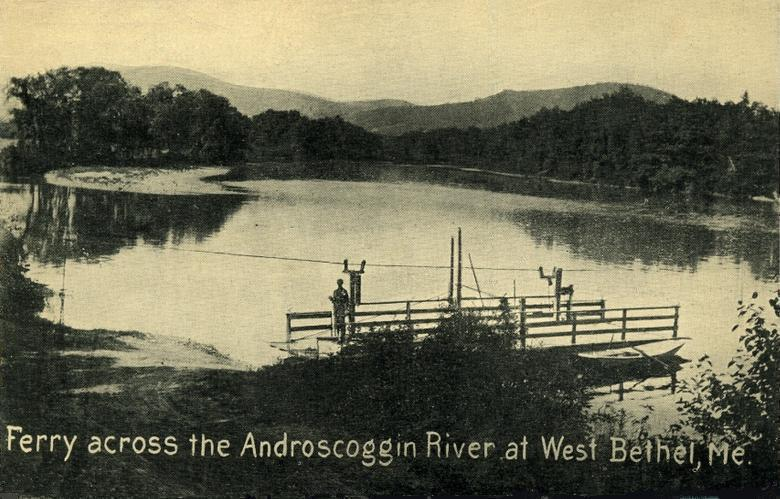
Ferry across the Androscoggin River at West Bethel in 1909

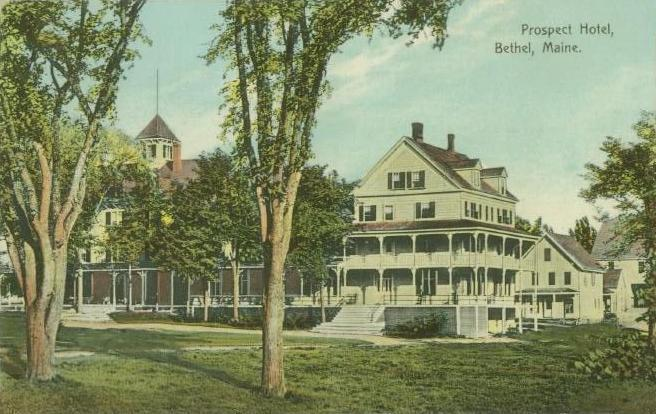
The Prospect Hotel, largest in Bethel, as it appeared in 1909

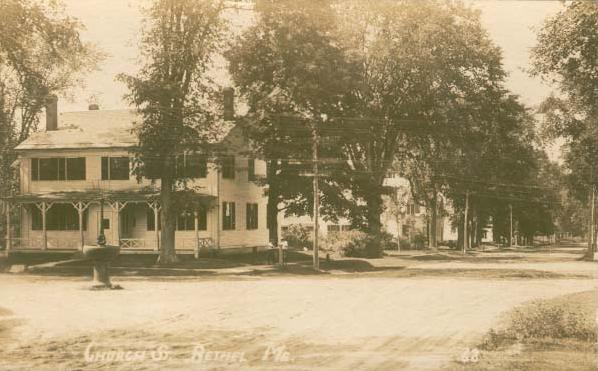
Church Street in c. 1912

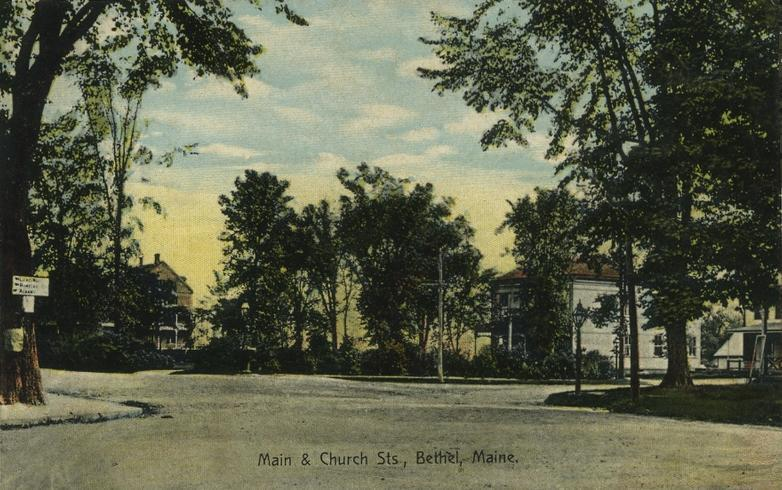
Main and Church streets in 1913

On March 10, 1851, the Atlantic and St. Lawrence Railroad opened to Bethel, carrying freight and summer tourists eager to escape the noise, heat and pollution of cities. Between the Civil War and World War I, Bethel was a fashionable summer resort. Several hotels were built facing the common or on Bethel Hill. Begun in 1863, The Prospect Hotel was the largest, with a cupola from which guests could observe the mountains. Tally-ho coaches provided tours through wilderness landscapes of the White Mountains and Maine. Dr. John G. Gehring's famed clinic for nervous disorders attracted many wealthy patients. Between 1897 and 1926, a number of figures in the music world performed at the Maine Music Festivals organized by William Rogers Chapman. But with the advent of the automobile, tourists were no longer restricted by the limits of train service, but were free to explore. Consequently, many big hotels built near the tracks lost patrons, declined and were eventually torn down. The Prospect Hotel was largely destroyed by fire in 1911. Although transportation patterns and preferences in vacation accommodations have changed, Bethel remains a tourist destination for its natural setting, history and recreation resources.

== Organizational development ==
Beginning in 1947 Bethel became the site of "pioneering work" in organizational development. Led by psychologist Kurt Lewin and, eventually, colleagues like Ken Benne and Ron Lippitt, research was conducted that helped lay the foundation for organizational development's theory and practice. T-groups and sensitivity training were refined to apply behavioral science to individual self-awareness and group functioning, in the service of organizational efficiency and productivity. The National Training Laboratories (NTL) was organized by Lewin to lead this work, with much or it conducted during summer seasons at Gould Academy. These seasonal research and training sessions were well attended, attracting participants from across the country and around the world. Increasingly, NTL became an important part of Bethel's economy, especially as the traditional wood product mill industries went into decline. Although NTL moved its headquarters to Alexandria, Virginia in 2008, it continues to maintain a small summer legacy presence in Bethel.

== Geography ==
Bethel is located on the western edge of the Oxford Hills and on the southern rim of the rugged Mahoosuc Range. Nearby Locke and Barker Mountains lie within the Mahoosuc Range, which is a subrange of the White Mountains, a part of the Northern Appalachian Mountains. Bethel and the surrounding area is drained by the Androscoggin River and its tributaries: the Alder, Pleasant and Sunday Rivers. The north edge of Songo Pond lies within Bethel's boundary. Just south of the boundary are located South Pond, North Pond and Bryant Ponds. According to the United States Census Bureau, the town has a total area of 65.91 square miles (170.71 km^{2}), of which 64.60 square miles (167.31 km^{2}) is land and 1.31 square miles (3.39 km^{2}) is water.

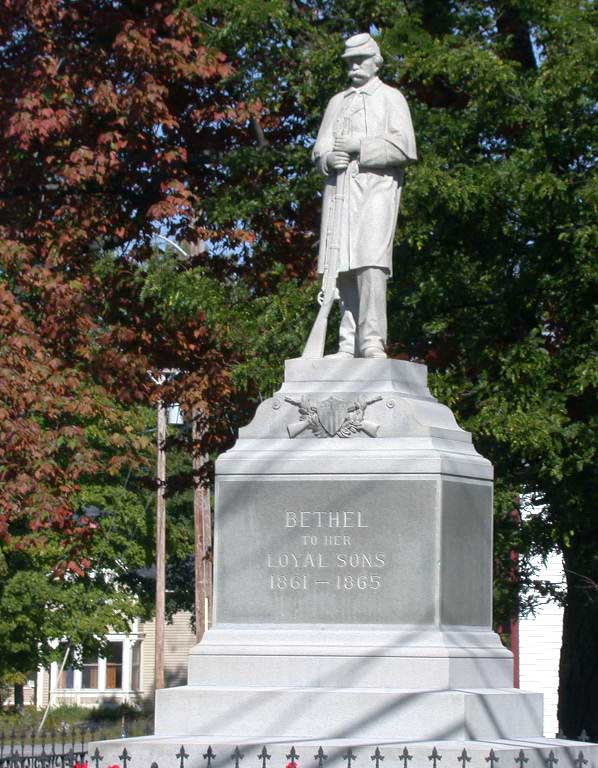
Memorial to American Civil War veterans

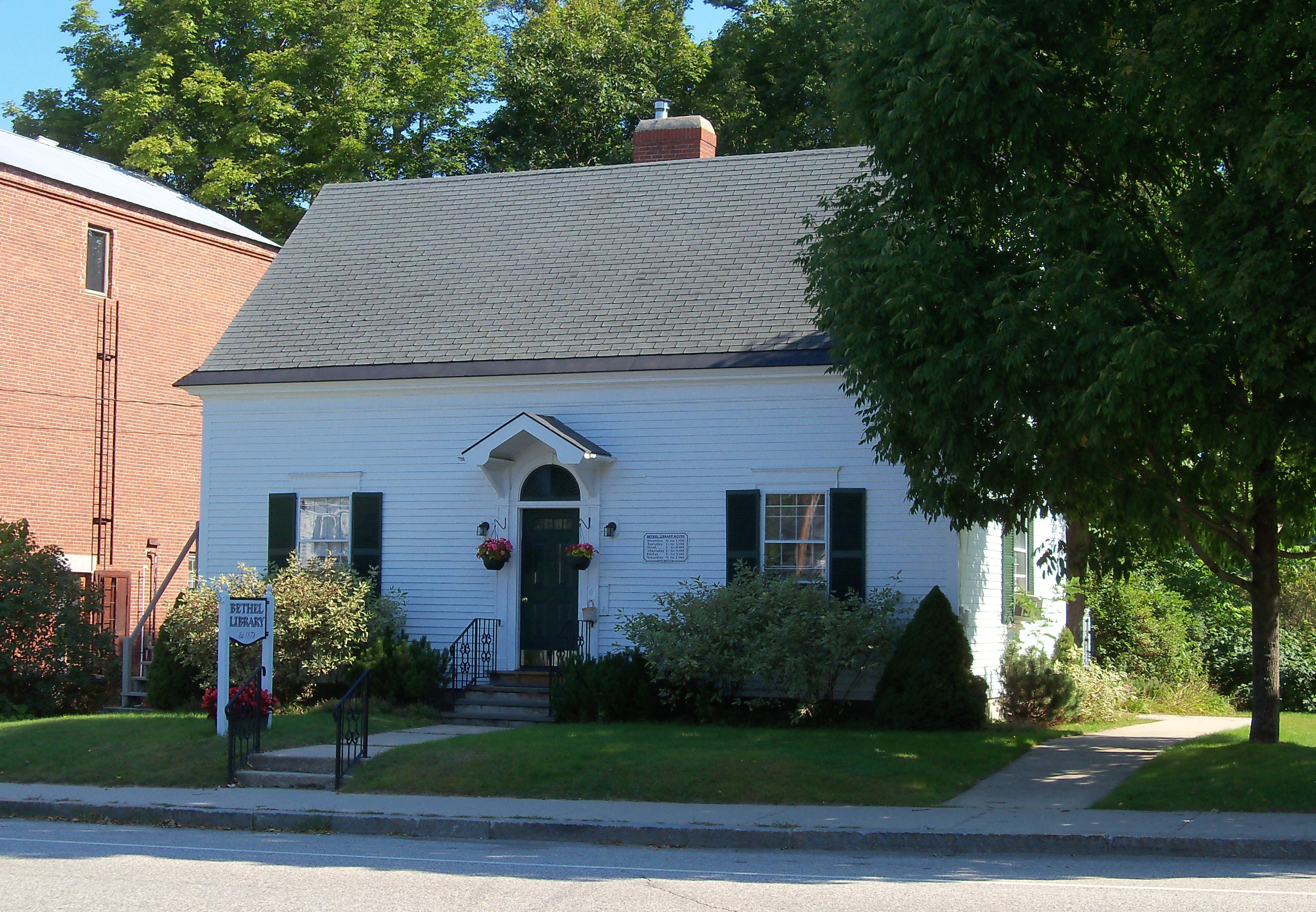
Bethel Public Library

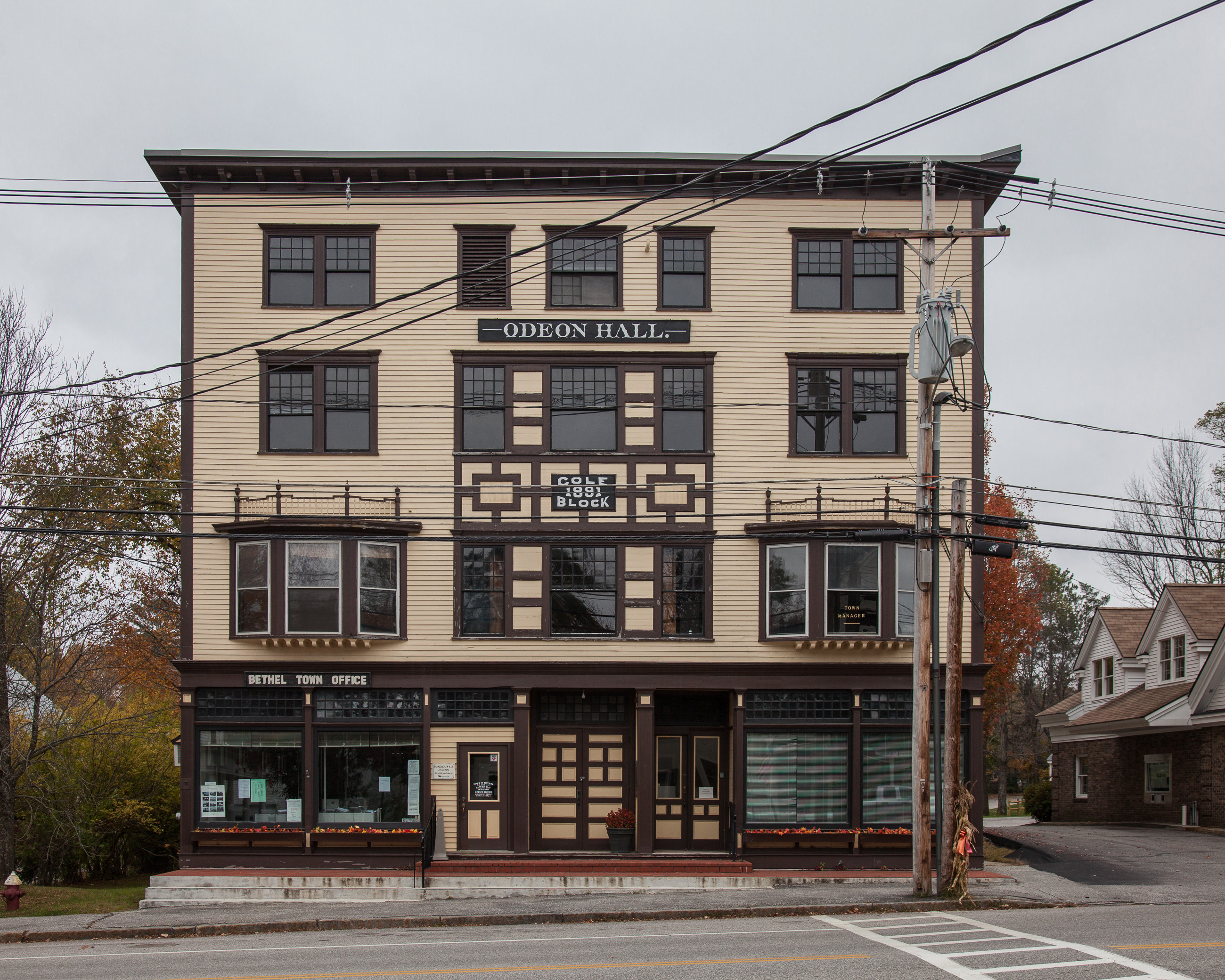
Cole Block Bethel Maine

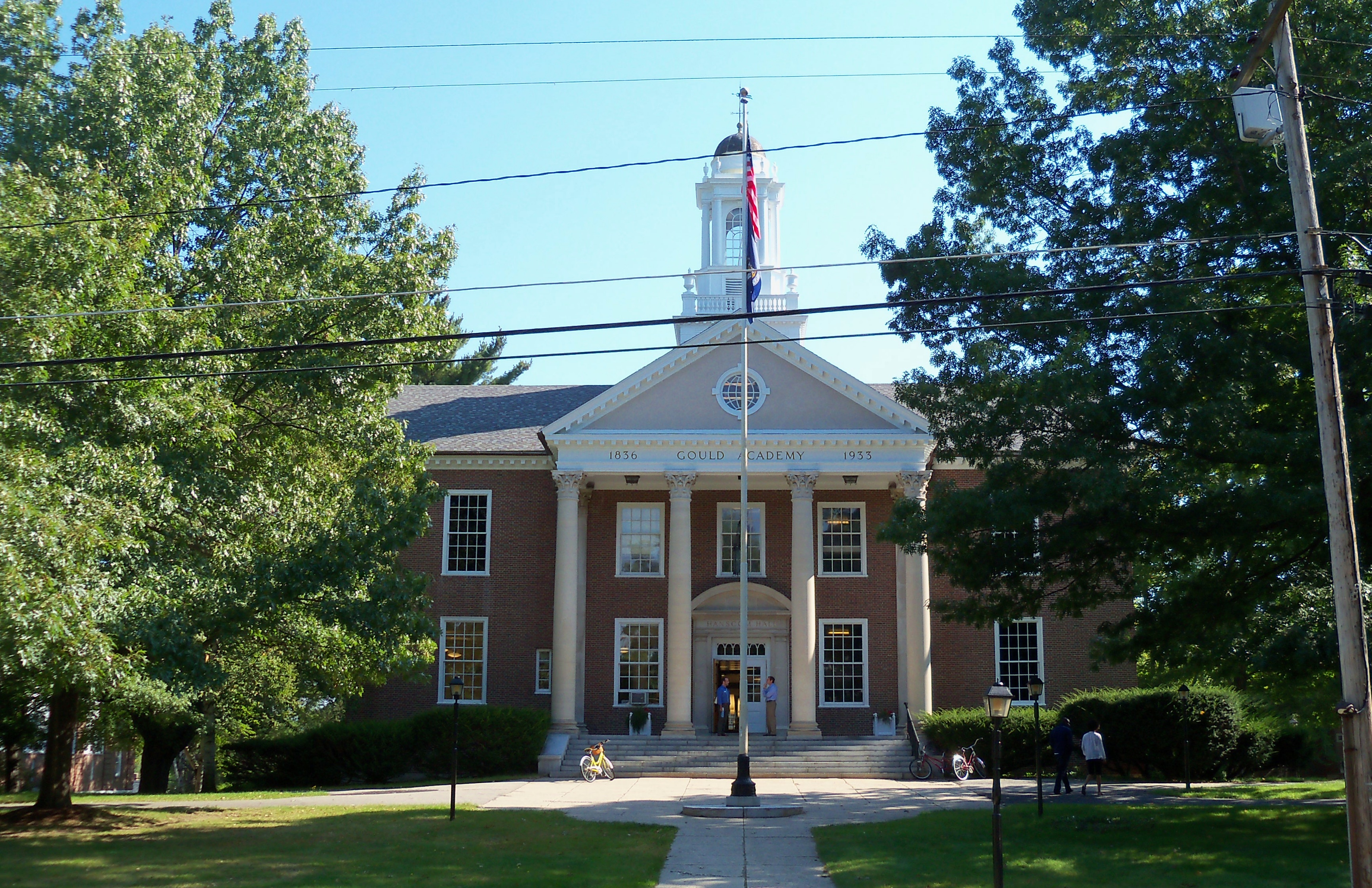
Gould Academy

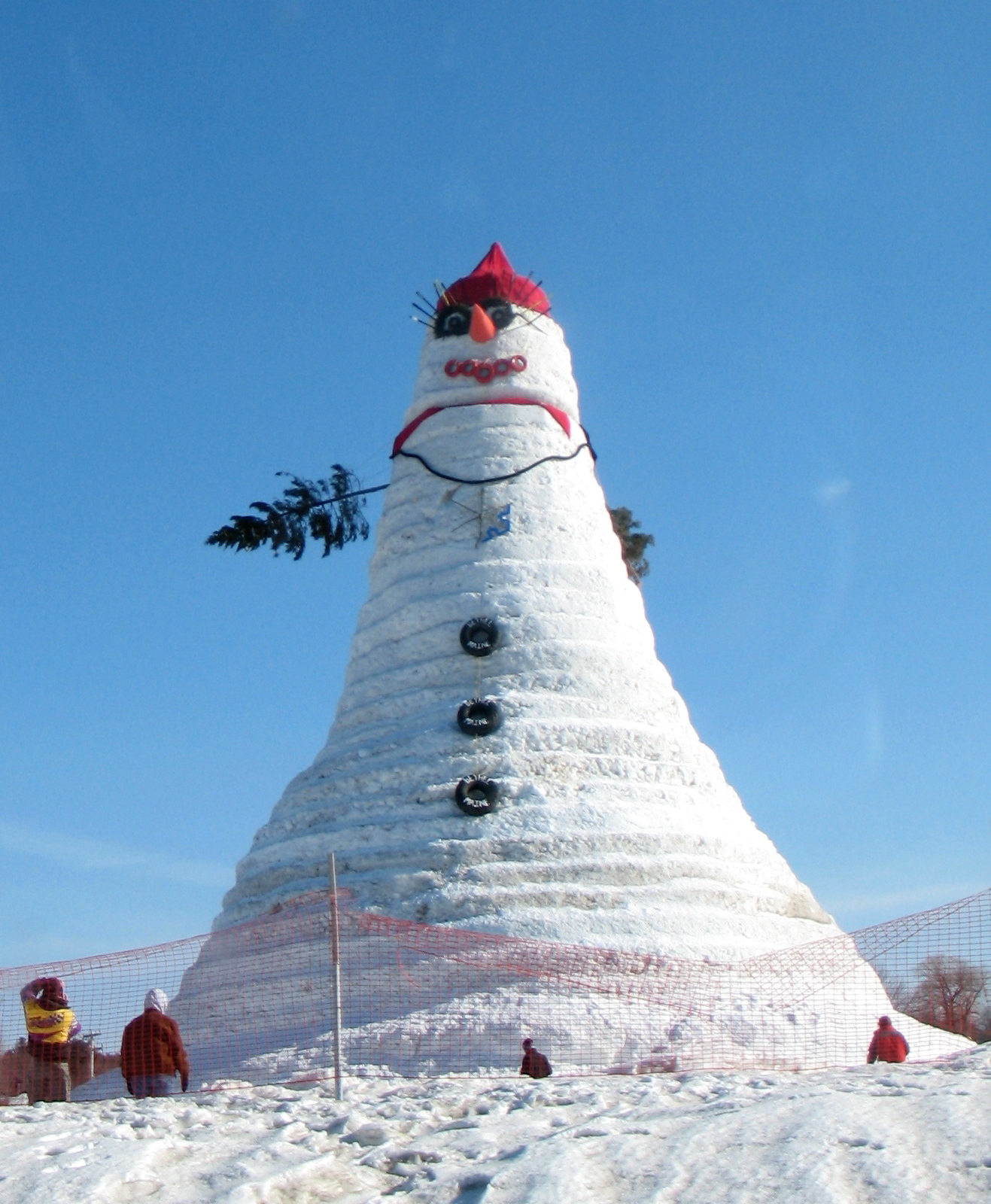
Bethel's Olympia Snow Woman (122 ft, 2008), named for Senator Olympia Snowe

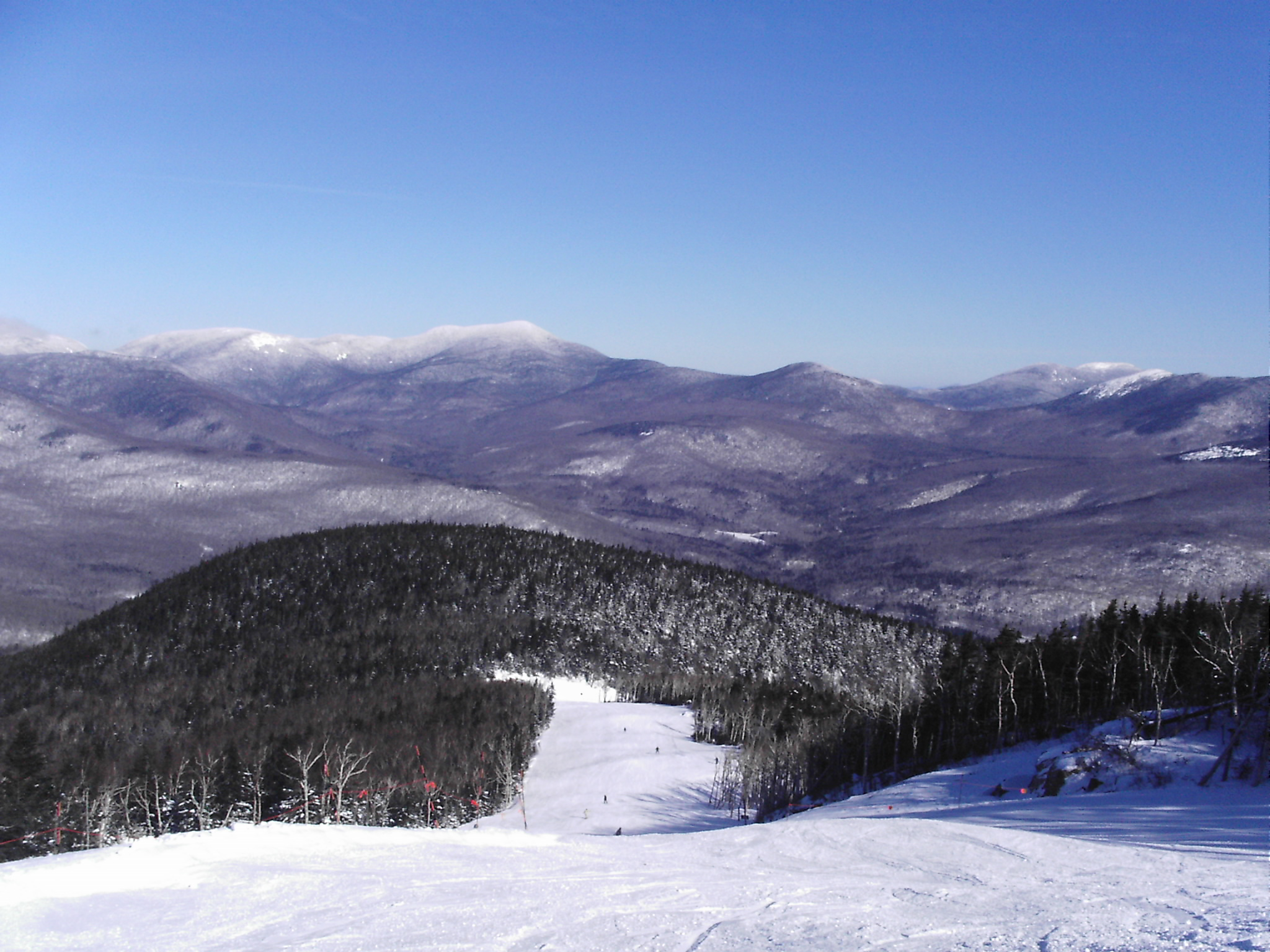
Sunday River Ski Resort near Bethel

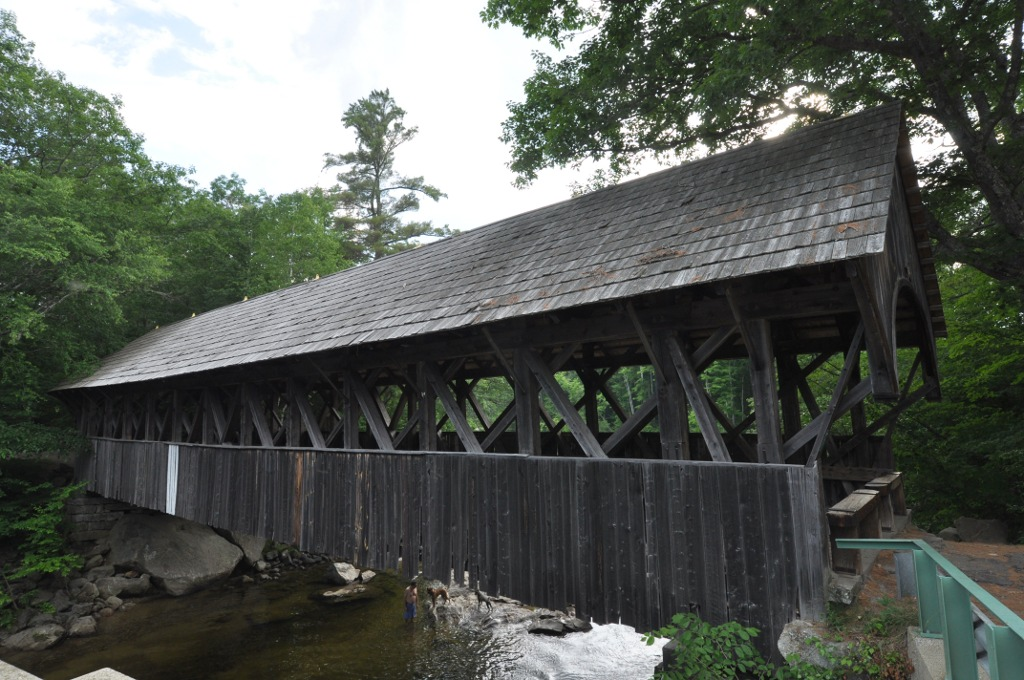
Sunday River Covered Bridge near Bethel

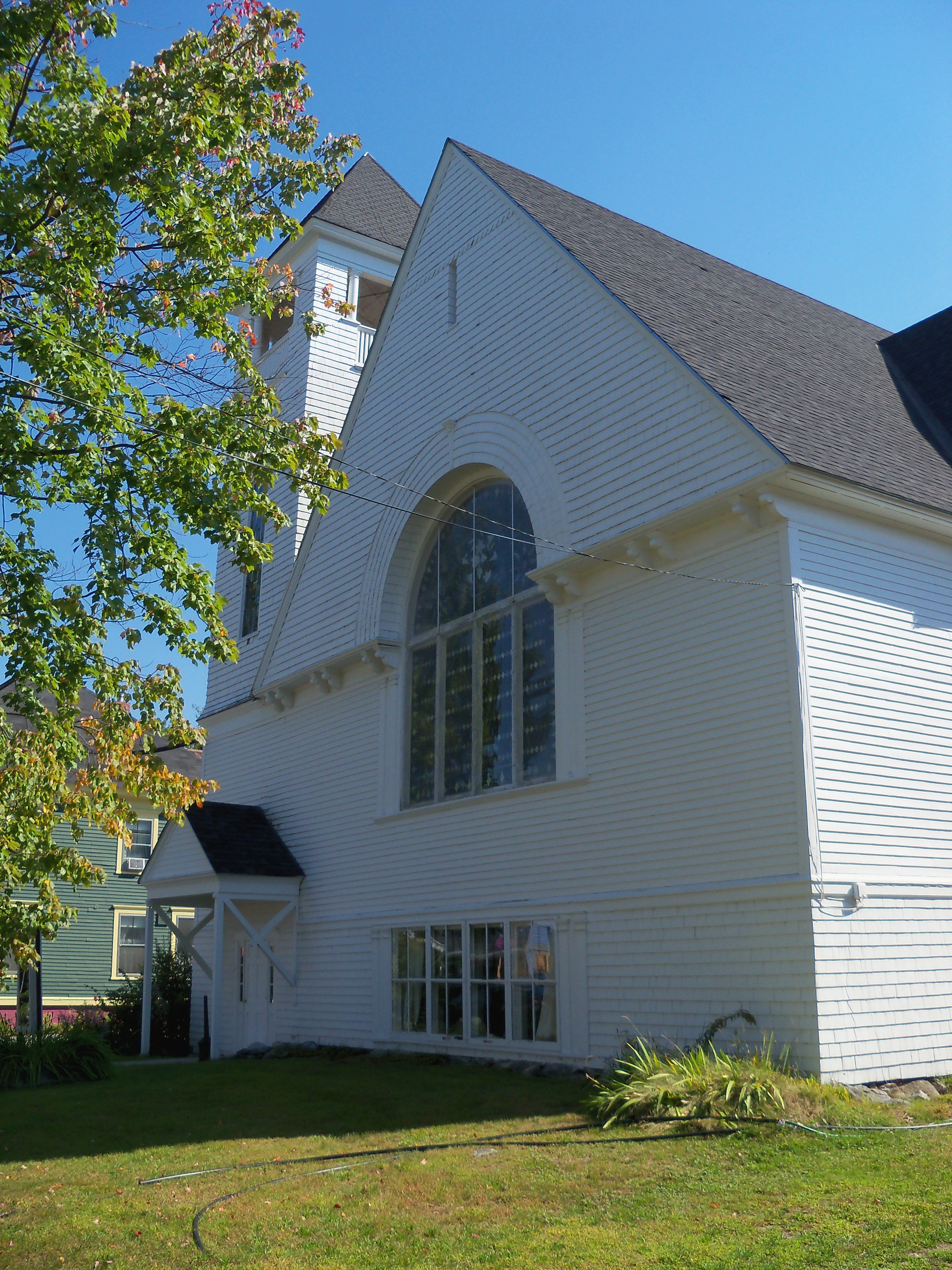
Methodist Church

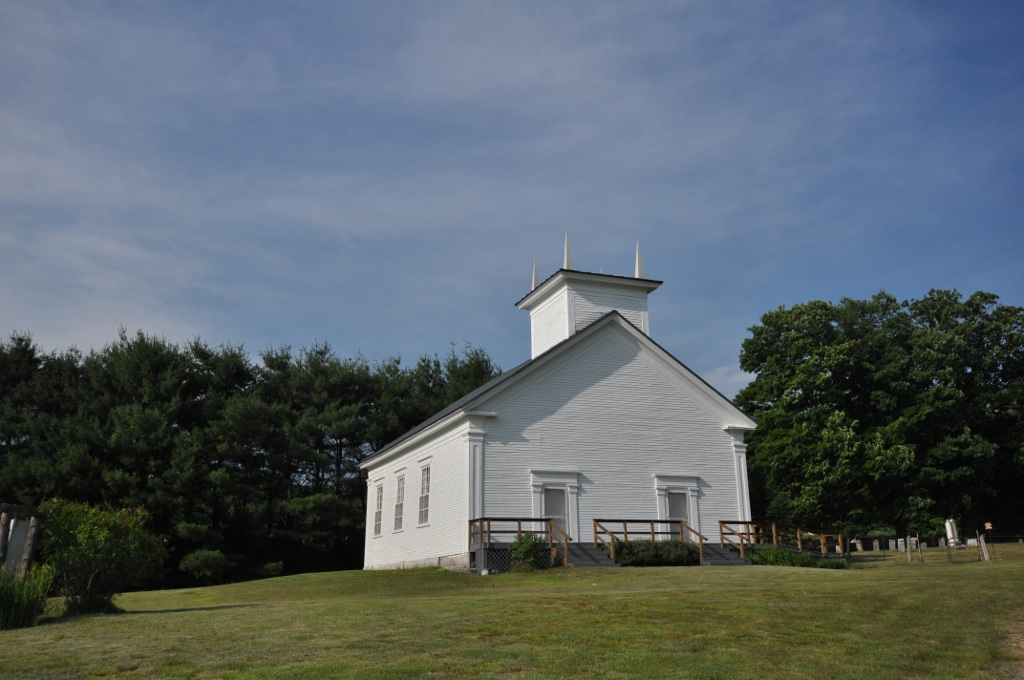
Middle Intervale Meeting House and Common

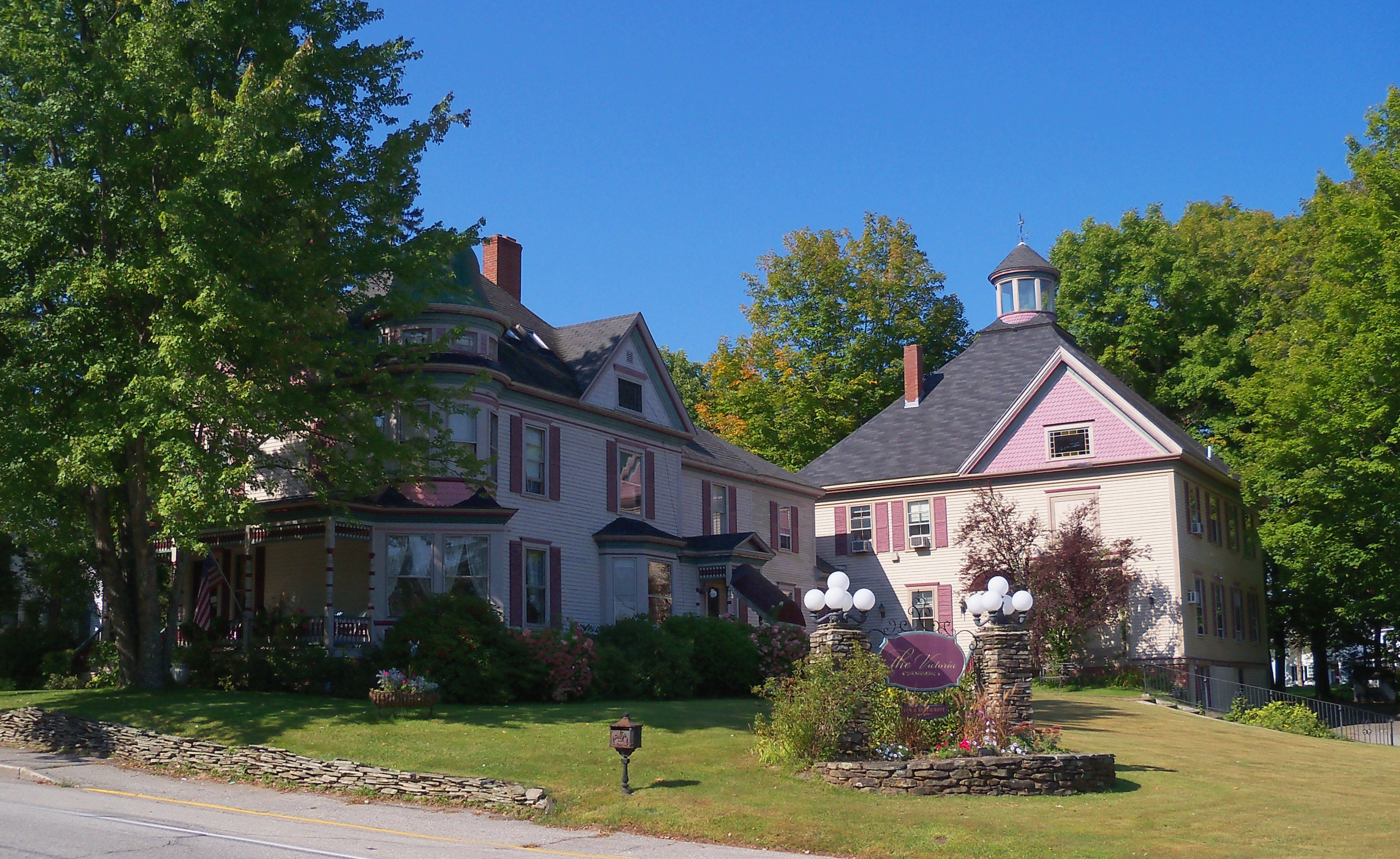
Victoria Inn

== Demographics ==
Historical population
Census	Pop.	Note	%±
1800	616		—
1810	975		58.3%
1820	1,267		29.9%
1830	1,620		27.9%
1840	1,994		23.1%
1850	2,253		13.0%
1860	2,523		12.0%
1870	2,286		−9.4%
1880	2,077		−9.1%
1890	2,209		6.4%
1900	1,835		−16.9%
1910	1,930		5.2%
1920	1,792		−7.2%
1930	2,025		13.0%
1940	2,034		0.4%
1950	2,367		16.4%
1960	2,408		1.7%
1970	2,220		−7.8%
1980	2,340		5.4%
1990	2,329		−0.5%
2000	2,411		3.5%
2010	2,607		8.1%
2020	2,504		−4.0%
U.S. Decennial Census

=== 2010 census ===
As of the census of 2010, there were 2,607 people, 1,121 households, and 707 families living in the town. The population density was 40.4 inhabitants per square mile (15.6/km^{2}). There were 1,861 housing units at an average density of 28.8 per square mile (11.1/km^{2}). The racial makeup of the town was 97.2% White, 0.5% African American, 0.2% Native American, 0.5% Asian, 0.5% from other races, and 1.0% from two or more races. Hispanic or Latino of any race were 1.2% of the population.

There were 1,121 households, of which 29.7% had children under the age of 18 living with them, 47.6% were married couples living together, 9.5% had a female householder with no husband present, 5.9% had a male householder with no wife present, and 36.9% were non-families. 29.1% of all households were made up of individuals, and 13.2% had someone living alone who was 65 years of age or older. The average household size was 2.33 and the average family size was 2.83.

The median age in the town was 42.9 years. 23.3% of residents were under the age of 18; 6.1% were between the ages of 18 and 24; 23.6% were from 25 to 44; 31.1% were from 45 to 64; and 15.9% were 65 years of age or older. The gender makeup of the town was 48.0% male and 52.0% female.

=== 2000 census ===
As of the census of 2000, there were 2,411 people, 1,034 households, and 677 families living in the town. The population density was 37.2 inhabitants per square mile (14.4/km^{2}). There were 1,448 housing units at an average density of 22.3 per square mile (8.6/km^{2}). The racial makeup of the town was 98.09% White, 0.21% African American, 0.37% Native American, 0.50% Asian, 0.12% from other races, and 0.71% from two or more races. Hispanic or Latino of any race were 0.79% of the population.

There were 1,034 households, out of which 27.3% had children under the age of 18 living with them, 52.5% were married couples living together, 9.4% had a female householder with no husband present, and 34.5% were non-families. 26.9% of all households were made up of individuals, and 10.0% had someone living alone who was 65 years of age or older. The average household size was 2.33 and the average family size was 2.77.

In the town, the population was spread out, with 22.4% under the age of 18, 6.8% from 18 to 24, 27.4% from 25 to 44, 27.6% from 45 to 64, and 15.8% who were 65 years of age or older. The median age was 41 years. For every 100 females, there were 96.0 males. For every 100 females age 18 and over, there were 94.6 males.

The median income for a household in the town was $33,803, and the median income for a family was $38,669. Males had a median income of $31,569 versus $18,859 for females. The per capita income for the town was $17,458. About 8.0% of families and 10.2% of the population were below the poverty line, including 11.2% of those under age 18 and 5.7% of those age 65 or over.

== Arts, culture and recreation ==
=== Sites of interest ===
- Museums of the Bethel Historical Society
- Middle Intervale Meeting House and Common
- Bethel Inn Resort
- Sunday River Ski Resort
- Maine Mineral and Gem Museum

== Education ==
- Maine School Administrative District 44 (MSAD 44)
  - Crescent Park Elementary School
  - Telstar Regional Middle/High School
- Gould Academy, a private coeducational preparatory school

== Notable people ==
- Henry J. Bean, judge and state representative in Oregon
- Matt Bevin (born 1967), Gould Academy student, businessman and Governor of Kentucky (2015–2019)
- Richard Blanco, 2013 U.S. presidential inaugural poet
- Timothy J. Carter, ME Representative for the 25th Congress and Luther C. Carter, NY Representative for the 36th Congress, both sons of Dr. Timothy Carter, the first physician to settle in the town
- Simon Dumont, Freeskier
- Cuvier Grover, Civil War era general
- Edwin Osgood Grover, Professor of Books at Rollins College
- Frederick Grover, Professor of Botany at Oberlin College
- La Fayette Grover, fourth governor of Oregon, member of the United States House of Representatives and member of the United States Senate
- Thomas Holt, architect
- Chandler Leighton, singer/ songwriter
- Moses Mason, physician, congressman
- Edward Sylvester Morse (1838–1925), Gould Academy student and director of a predecessor to the Peabody Essex Museum in Salem, Massachusetts
- Mary Ann Frost Stearns Pratt, wife of Mormon leader Parley Pratt
- Patty Bartlett Sessions, midwife and plural wife of Joseph Smith
- Marshall Stedman, actor/director, playwright, author and drama teacher
- Philip Hunter Timberlake, entomologist
- James S. Wiley, congressman
