= List of census-designated places in Maine =

Map of the United States with Maine highlighted

This article lists incorporated places and census-designated places (CDPs) in the U.S. state of Maine. As of 2020, there were a total of 23 incorporated places in Maine, and 132 census-designated places.

== Incorporated Places ==
No.	City	Population	County
1	Auburn	24,061	Androscoggin
2	Augusta	18,899	Kennebec
3	Bangor	31,753	Penobscot
4	Bath	8,766	Sagadahoc
5	Belfast	6,938	Waldo
6	Brewer	9,672	Penobscot
7	Biddeford	22,552	York
8	Calais	3,079	Washington
9	Caribou	7,396	Aroostook
10	Eastport	1,288	Washington
11	Ellsworth	8,399	Hancock
12	Gardiner	5,961	Kennebec
13	Hallowell	2,570	Kennebec
14	Lewiston	37,121	Androscoggin
15	Old Town	7,431	Penobscot
16	Portland	68,408	Cumberland
17	Presque Isle	8,797	Aroostook
18	Rockland	6,936	Knox
19	Saco	20,381	York
20	Sanford	21,982	York
21	South Portland	26,498	Cumberland
22	Waterville	15,828	Kennebec
23	Westbrook	20,400	Cumberland

== Census-designated places ==
No.	CDP	Population	Town	Town Population	County
1	Alfred	874	Alfred	3,073	York
2	Anson	680	Anson	2,291	Somerset
3	North Anson	420	Anson	2,291	Somerset
4	Ashland	639	Ashland	1,202	Aroostook
5	Woodland	1,059	Baileyville	1,217	Washington
6	Bar Harbor	2,260	Bar Harbor	5,089	Hancock
7	Berwick	2,277	Berwick	7,950	York
8	Bethel	658	Bethel	2,504	Oxford
9	Bingham	716	Bingham	866	Somerset
10	Blaine	250	Blaine	667	Aroostook
11	Blue Hill	963	Blue Hill	2,792	Hancock
12	Boothbay Harbor	872	Boothbay Harbor	5,030 (Note: Population includes Boothbay)	Lincoln
13	Bowdoinham	734	Bowdoinham	3,047	Sagadahoc
14	Bradley	765	Bradley	1,532	Penobscot
15	Bridgton	2,118	Bridgton	5,418	Cumberland
16	Brownville Junction	506	Brownville	1,139	Piscataquis
17	Brunswick	17,033	Brunswick	21,756	Cumberland
18	Bucksport	2,832	Bucksport	4,944	Hancock
19	Camden	3,850	Camden	5,232	Knox
20	Casco	582	Casco	3,646	Cumberland
21	Castine	1,014	Castine	1,320	Hancock
22	Clinton	1,386	Clinton	3,370	Kennebec
23	Corinna	729	Corinna	2,221	Penobscot
24	Cornish	764	Cornish	1,508	York
25	Cumberland Center	2,739	Cumberland	8,473	Cumberland
26	Damariscotta	1,193	Damariscotta	2,297	Lincoln
27	Danforth	331	Danforth	587	Washington
28	Dexter	2,093	Dexter	3,803	Penobscot
29	Dixfield	1,323	Dixfield	2,253	Oxford
30	Dover-Foxcroft	2,776	Dover-Foxcroft	4,422	Piscataquis
31	Eagle Lake	553	Eagle Lake	772	Aroostook
32	East Millinocket	1,560	East Millinocket	1,572	Penobscot
33	South Eliot	3,719	Eliot	6,717	York
34	Fairfield	2,616	Fairfield	6,484	Somerset
35	Falmouth	1,988	Falmouth	12,444	Cumberland
36	Falmouth Foreside	1,554	Falmouth	12,444	Cumberland
37	Farmingdale	2,000	Farmingdale	2,995	Kennebec
38	Farmington	4,168	Farmington	7,592	Franklin
39	Fort Fairfield	1,666	Fort Fairfield	3,332	Aroostook
40	Fort Kent	2,413	Fort Kent	4,067	Aroostook
41	Freeport	1,700	Freeport	8,737	Cumberland
42	Fryeburg	1,444	Fryeburg	3,369	Oxford
43	Gorham	7,469	Gorham	18,336	Cumberland
44	Little Falls	863	Gorham	18,336	Cumberland
45	Grand Isle	184	Grand Isle	366	Aroostook
46	Gray	887	Gray	8,269	Cumberland
47	Greene	750	Greene	4,376	Androscoggin
48	Greenville	1,010	Greenville	1,437	Piscataquis
49	Guilford	740	Guilford	1,267	Piscataquis
50	Hampden	4,516	Hampden	7,709	Penobscot
51	Hartland	813	Hartland	1,705	Somerset
52	Houlton	4,743	Houlton	6,055	Aroostook
53	Howland	947	Howland	1,094	Penobscot
54	Island Falls	309	Island Falls	758	Aroostook
55	Chisholm	1,343	Jay	4,620	Franklin
56	Jonesport	608	Jonesport	1,245	Washington
57	Kennebunk	5,776	Kennebunk	11,536	York
58	West Kennebunk	1,191	Kennebunk	11,536	York
59	Kennebunkport	1,264	Kennebunkport	3,629	York
60	Kingfield	640	Kingfield	960	Franklin
61	Kittery	4,973	Kittery	10,070	York
62	Kittery Point	1,009	Kittery	10,070	York
63	Lake Arrowhead	3,192	Waterboro	7,936	York
63	Lake Arrowhead	3,192	Limerick	3,188	York
64	Limestone	874	Limestone	1,526	Aroostook
65	Lincoln	2,667	Lincoln	4,853	Penobscot
66	Lisbon	3,217	Lisbon	9,711	Androscoggin
67	Lisbon Falls	4,182	Lisbon	9,711	Androscoggin
68	Livermore Falls	1,540	Livermore Falls	5,187 (Note: Population includes Livermore)	Androscoggin
69	Lubec	1,237	Lubec	1,237	Washington
70	Machias	1,457	Machias	2,060	Washington
71	Madawaska	2,797	Madawaska	3,867	Aroostook
72	Madison	2,533	Madison	4,726	Somerset
73	Mapleton	623	Mapleton	1,886	Aroostook
74	Mars Hill	818	Mars Hill	1,360	Aroostook
75	Mattawamkeag	422	Mattawamkeag	596	Penobscot
76	Mechanic Falls	2,257	Mechanic Falls	3,107	Androscoggin
77	Mexico	2,234	Mexico	2,756	Oxford
78	Milbridge	435	Milbridge	1,375	Washington
79	Milford	2,211	Milford	3,069	Penobscot
80	Millinocket	4,104	Millinocket	4,114	Penobscot
81	Milo	1,751	Milo	2,251	Piscataquis
82	Northeast Harbor	410	Mount Desert	2,146	Hancock
83	Naples	415	Naples	3,925	Cumberland
84	Newcastle	660	Newcastle	1,848	Lincoln
85	Newport	1,690	Newport	3,133	Penobscot
86	Norridgewock	1,351	Norridgewock	3,278	Somerset
87	North Berwick	1,721	North Berwick	4,978	York
88	North Windham	5,274	Windham	5,274	Cumberland
89	Norway	2,696	Norway	5,077	Oxford
90	Oakfield	378	Oakfield	661	Aroostook
91	Oakland	2,536	Oakland	6,230	Kennebec
92	Old Orchard Beach	8,624	Old Orchard Beach	8,960	York
93	Orono	10,185	Orono	11,183	Penobscot
94	Oxford	1,294	Oxford	4,229	Oxford
95	South Paris	2,183	Paris	6,945 (Note: Population includes West Paris)	Oxford
96	Patten	539	Patten	881	Penobscot
97	Pittsfield	2,822	Pittsfield	3,908	Somerset
98	Kezar Falls	834	Porter	1,600	Oxford
99	Randolph		Randolph	1,743	Kennebec
100	Rangeley	590	Rangeley	1,222	Franklin
101	Richmond	1,810	Richmond	3,522	Sagadahoc
102	Rumford	4,298	Rumford	5,858	Oxford
103	Sabattus	787	Sabattus	5,044	Androscoggin
104	Searsport	999	Searsport	2,663	Waldo
105	Skowhegan	6,404	Skowhegan	8,620	Somerset
106	South Berwick	3,825	South Berwick	7,467	York
107	Dunstan	2,083	Scarborough	22,135	Cumberland
108	Oak Hill	5,846	Scarborough	22,135	Cumberland
109	Southwest Harbor	740	Southwest Harbor	1,756	Hancock
110	Standish	480	Standish	10,244	Cumberland
111	Steep Falls	1,223	Standish	10,244	Cumberland
112	Thomaston	1,836	Thomaston	4,250 (Note: Population includes South Thomaston)	Knox
113	Topsham	6,623	Topsham	9,560	Sagadahoc
114	Turner	544	Turner	5,817	Androscoggin
115	Unity	448	Unity	2,292	Waldo
116	Van Buren	1,809	Van Buren	2,038	Aroostook
117	Vanceboro	94	Vanceboro	102	Washington
118	Veazie		Veazie	1,814	Penobscot
119	Waldoboro	1,300	Waldoboro	5,154	Lincoln
120	Washburn	937	Washburn	1,527	Aroostook
121	Wilton	2,071	Wilton	3,835	Franklin
122	South Windham	1,215	Windham	1,215	Cumberland
123	Winslow	5,318	Winslow	7,948	Kennebec
124	Winter Harbor	385	Winter Harbor	461	Hancock
125	Winterport	1,355	Winterport	3,817	Waldo
126	Winthrop	2,666	Winthrop	6,121	Kennebec
127	Wiscasset	1,232	Wiscasset	3,742	Lincoln
128	Cousins Island	528	Yarmouth	8,965	Cumberland
129	Littlejohn Island	116	Yarmouth	8,965	Cumberland
130	Yarmouth	6,125	Yarmouth	8,965	Cumberland
131	Cape Neddick	3,073	York	13,723	York
132	York Harbor	3,132	York	13,723	York

== See also ==
- List of municipalities in Maine
- List of places in Maine
