= U.S. Route 1 in Maine =

State highway in eastern Maine, US

U.S. Route 1
- US 1 highlighted in red

Route information
- Maintained by MaineDOT
- Length: 526.05 mi (846.60 km)
- Existed: 1926–present

Major junctions
- South end: US 1 at the New Hampshire state line in Kittery
- I-195 in Saco; I-295 at the Portland-Yarmouth line; US 302 / SR 100 in Portland; I-495 in Falmouth; US 201 in Brunswick; SR 9 in Calais; US 2 in Houlton; I-95 in Houlton; SR 161 in Caribou; SR 11 in Fort Kent
- North end: Route 161 / Route 205 at the Canadian border in Fort Kent

Location
- Country: United States
- State: Maine
- Counties: York, Cumberland, Sagadahoc, Lincoln, Knox, Waldo, Hancock, Washington, Aroostook

Highway system
- United States Numbered Highway System; List; Special; Divided; Maine State Highway System; Interstate; US; State; Auto trails; Lettered highways
← I-495	→ US 1A
← Route 20	N.E.	→ Route 25

U.S. Route 1 (US 1) in the U.S. state of Maine is a major north–south section of the United States Numbered Highway System, serving the eastern part of the state. It parallels the Atlantic Ocean from New Hampshire north through Portland, Brunswick, and Belfast to Calais, and then the St. Croix River and the rest of the Canada–United States border via Houlton to Fort Kent. The portion along the ocean, known as the Coastal Route, provides a scenic alternate to Interstate 95 (I-95).

== Route description ==
US 1 enters Maine from New Hampshire by bridging the Piscataqua River at Kittery on the Memorial Bridge. Following the sandy southern Maine coast, the highway bridges the Cape Neddick River in Cape Neddick; the Josias and Ogunquit rivers in Ogunquit; the Webhannet River in Wells; and the Merriland, Mousam, and Kennebunk rivers in Kennebunk. After bridging the Saco River between Biddeford and Saco, the highway bridges the Nonesuch River in Scarborough.

In South Portland, US 1 merges with I-295 at exit 4 and continues north through downtown Portland to Tukey's Bridge, now on I-295, before separating at exit 9. The Charles Loring Highway is part of US 1 in Portland. Like Loring Air Force Base, it is named for Charles J. Loring Jr.

North of Portland, the highway bridges the Presumpscot River (via the Martin's Point Bridge) in Falmouth, the Royal River in Yarmouth, and the Cousins River in Freeport before following the Androscoggin River through Brunswick and crossing the Kennebec River on the Sagadahoc Bridge between Bath and Woolwich. The section between Brunswick (at its junction with US 201) and Bath is a four-lane freeway, and the route continues as a four-lane expressway through most of Bath, then crosses on a two-lane viaduct before becoming four lanes again on the bridge over the Kennebec River. It then becomes a three-lane road (with center turning lane) through Woolwich and then reverts to two lanes after that as it continues north toward Wiscasset.

The highway bridges the Sheepscot River in Wiscasset, the Damariscotta River in Damariscotta, the Medomak River in Waldoboro, and the St. George River in Thomaston, before reaching Rockland.

In Rockland, there is a bypass of downtown (US 1A) which travels along Broadway and Maverick streets, while US 1 itself has a one-way pair with Main and Union streets in the downtown Rockland area (Main Street traffic goes north with two lanes, while Union Street traffic is southbound).

The highway follows the coast of Penobscot Bay bridging the Goose River in Rockport, the Ducktrap River in Lincolnville, the Little River in Northport, and the Passagassawakeag River in Belfast, before bridging the Penobscot River at Bucksport. The Atlantic coast is less frequently visible as the highway bridges the Orland River in Orland, the Union River in Ellsworth, Sullivan Harbor in Sullivan, the Narraguagus River in Cherryfield, the Harrington River in Harrington, the Pleasant River at Columbia Falls, the Indian River in Addison, and the Chandler River in Jonesboro.

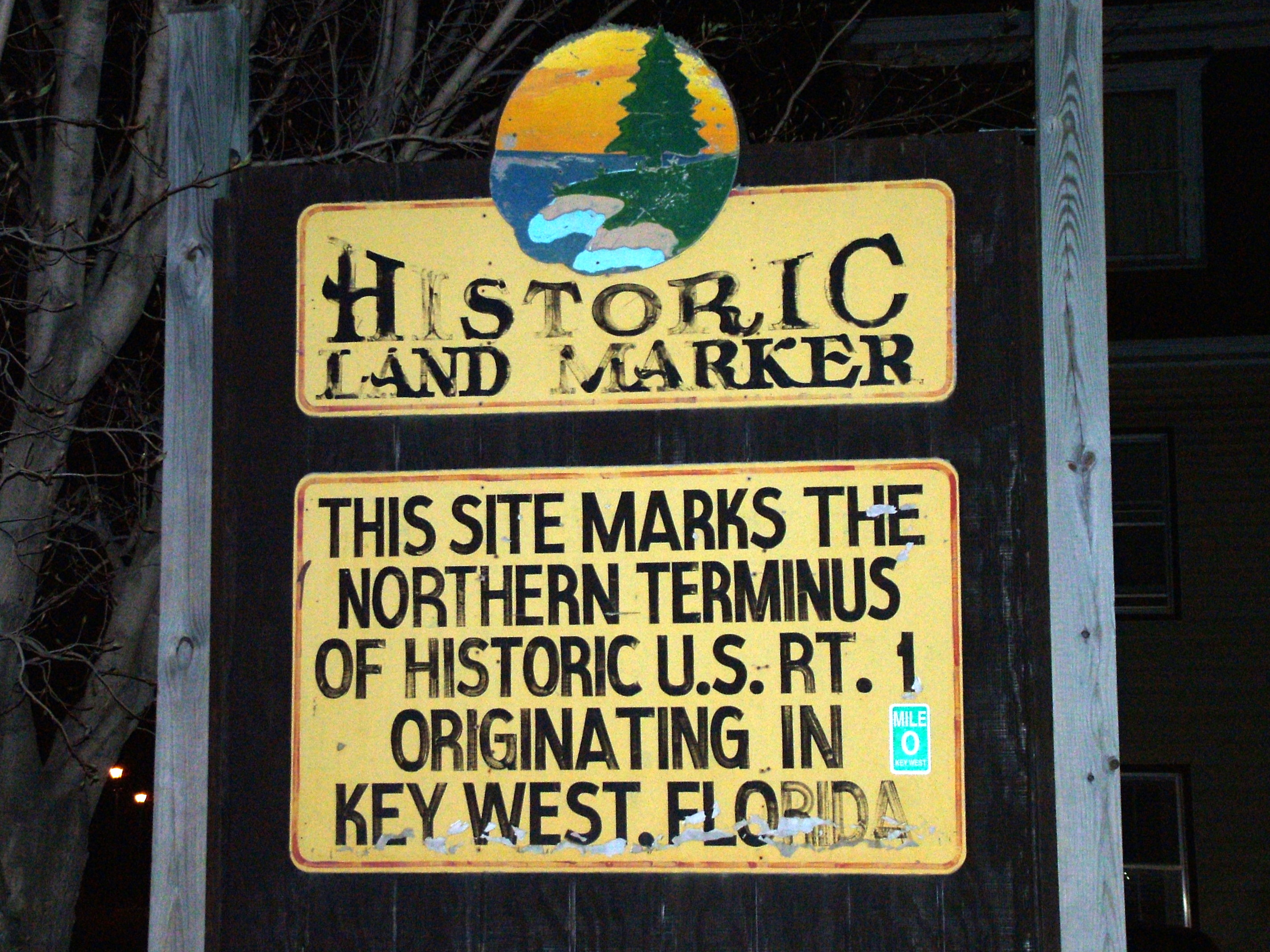
The monument marking the northern terminus in Fort Kent

After bridging the East Machias and Machias rivers in Machias, the highway turns inland along Passamaquoddy Bay to bridge the Orange River in Whiting, the Dennys River in Dennysville, and the Pennamaquan River in Pembroke. The highway then follows the St. Croix River through Calais and turns inland at Woodland. The interior route bridges Grand Falls Flowage at Princeton, the Meduxnekeag River in Houlton, the North Branch Meduxnekeag River in Monticello, and the Aroostook River in Presque Isle, before following the Saint John River upstream from Van Buren to Fort Kent.

From Madawaska to its "northern" terminus at the Clair–Fort Kent Bridge in Fort Kent, US 1 north actually travels geographically south. The route's most northerly geographic point is at its intersection with the Edmundston–Madawaska Bridge in Madawaska, across the Saint John River from Edmundston, New Brunswick, Canada.

== History ==
US 1 south of Calais was initially part of the Atlantic Highway and became Route 1 when the New England road marking system was established in 1922. The northward continuation from Calais was later designated as part of Route 24. In the original plan, Route 24 was to run from Brunswick to Moosehead Lake in Greenville. By 1925, however, Maine had transferred the Route 24 designation to a completely new alignment on the eastern edge of the state, running from Calais to Madawaska at a border crossing with Edmundston, New Brunswick.

The initial 1925 plan for the U.S. Route system took US 1 along the better-quality inland route (then Route 15) between Bangor and Houlton, and placed US 2 on the coastal route. This changed in the final 1926 plan, when the inland shortcut—now generally followed by I-95—became part of US 2.

The Waldo–Hancock Bridge opened in 1931, allowing US 1 to bypass Bangor; the old route became US 1A.

The portion between Portland and Brunswick was rebuilt, mainly as a four-lane divided highway, in the 1950s, and later absorbed into I-95 (now I-295). A freeway from Brunswick east to Bath was built in the 1960s.

== Major junctions ==
County	Location	mi	km	Destinations	Notes
York	Kittery	0.00	0.00	US 1 south – Portsmouth	Continuation from New Hampshire over the Piscataqua River
York	Kittery	0.58	0.93	SR 103 – Eliot, Navy Yard, Kittery Foreside	
York	Kittery	1.51	2.43	SR 236 to I-95 south (Maine Turnpike) / US 1 Byp. south – Kittery Point, New Hampshire, Massachusetts	Rotary; southern end of southbound concurrency with SR 236
York	Kittery	1.70	2.74	SR 236 north – South Berwick, Eliot	Northern end of southbound concurrency with SR 236
York	Kittery	1.79	2.88	US 1 Byp. south – New Hampshire, Massachusetts	Southbound left exit and northbound left entrance; northern terminus of US 1 Byp.
York	Kittery	2.07	3.33	I-95 / Maine Turnpike – Portland, Augusta, Portsmouth, Boston	Exit 3 on I-95 / Turnpike
York	Kittery	2.39	3.85	SR 101 north – Eliot	Southern terminus of SR 101
York	York	6.72	10.81	SR 91 north – South Berwick	Southern terminus of SR 91
York	York	7.09	11.41	US 1A north – York Village, York Harbor, York Beach	Southern terminus of US 1A
York	York	7.43	11.96	I-95 / Maine Turnpike	Exit 7 on I-95 / Turnpike; access via Spur Road
York	York	10.69	17.20	US 1A south	Northern terminus of US 1A
York	Wells	18.28	29.42	SR 9B west – North Berwick, Berwick	Eastern terminus of SR 9B
York	Wells	20.27	32.62	SR 9 west / SR 109 north to I-95 / Maine Turnpike – Sanford	Southern end of concurrency with SR 9; southern terminus of SR 109
York	Wells	22.12	35.60	SR 9 east – Kennebunkport, Kennebunk	Northern end of concurrency with SR 9
York	Kennebunk	25.10	40.39	SR 9A west / SR 99 west – Sanford	Southern end of concurrency with SR 9A; eastern terminus of SR 99
York	Kennebunk	25.46	40.97	SR 35 north to I-95 / Maine Turnpike	Southern end of wrong-way concurrency with SR 35
York	Kennebunk	25.50	41.04	SR 9A east / SR 35 south – Kennebunkport	Northern end of concurrency with SR 9 / SR 35
York	Biddeford	31.79	51.16	To I-95 / Maine Turnpike / SR 111	Biddeford Connector
York	Biddeford	32.94– 33.01	53.01– 53.12	SR 111 to I-95 / Maine Turnpike – Biddeford Pool, Alfred	Brief concurrency with SR 111
York	Saco	34.93	56.21	SR 5 north / SR 112 to SR 9 – Bar Mills, Buxton	Southern end of wrong-way concurrency with SR 5
York	Saco	35.82	57.65	SR 5 south – Old Orchard Beach	Northern end of wrong-way concurrency with SR 5
York	Saco	35.91	57.79	I-195 to I-95 / Maine Turnpike	No exit to I-195 east; Exit 2 on I-195
York	Saco	38.54	62.02	SR 98 east – Old Orchard Beach	Western terminus of SR 98
Cumberland	Scarborough	40.64	65.40	SR 9 west (Pine Point Road) – Old Orchard Beach	Southern end of concurrency with SR 9
Cumberland	Scarborough	43.73	70.38	SR 207 south – Prouts Neck SR 114 north – Gorham	Northern terminus of SR 207; Southern terminus of SR 114
Cumberland	Scarborough	44.89	72.24	To I-95 / Maine Turnpike / I-295 north – Portland	Interchange; eastbound exit and westbound entrance; access via SR 701
Cumberland	South Portland	46.26	74.45	To I-95 / Maine Turnpike / I-295 north	Access via SR 703
Cumberland	South Portland	46.39	74.66	SR 9 east – South Portland	Northern end of concurrency with SR 9
Cumberland	South Portland	47.97	77.20	Veterans Memorial Bridge to US 1A – Portland Waterfront	Interchange; northbound exit and southbound entrance
Cumberland	South Portland	48.40	77.89	I-295 south – South Portland, Scarborough	Southbound exit and northbound entrance; southern end of concurrency with I-295; Exit 4 on I-295 south
Cumberland	South Portland–Portland line	48.56	78.15	Fore River	
Cumberland	Portland	49.32	79.37	SR 22 / US 1A (Congress Street)	I-295 Exit 5; signed as Exits 5A (east) and 5B (west) southbound
Cumberland	Portland	50.21	80.81	SR 100 south (Forest Avenue)	I-295 Exit 6A; US 1 removed from Forest Avenue in May 2007
Cumberland	Portland	50.21	80.81	SR 100 north (Forest Avenue) / US 302 west	I-295 Exit 6B
Cumberland	Portland	50.75	81.67	US 1A (Franklin Street)	I-295 Exit 7
Cumberland	Portland	51.43	82.77	SR 26 south (Washington Avenue)	I-295 Exit 8; southbound signage; southbound exit and northbound entrance; southern end of concurrency with SR 26
Cumberland	Portland	51.59	83.03	SR 26 north (Washington Avenue)	I-295 Exit 8; northbound signage; northbound exit and southbound entrance; northern end of concurrency with SR 26
Cumberland	Portland	51.83	83.41	US 1 south / SR 26 north (Washington Avenue) / Baxter Boulevard	I-295 Exit 9; southbound signage; southbound exit and northbound entrance; US 1 removed from Baxter Boulevard in May 2007
Cumberland	Portland	51.99	83.67	I-295 north – Falmouth, Brunswick	Northbound exit and southbound entrance; northern end of concurrency with I-295; Exit 9 on I-295 north
Cumberland	Portland–Falmouth line	52.65	84.73	Martin Point Bridge over the Presumpscot River	
Cumberland	Falmouth	54.03	86.95	SR 88 north	Southern terminus of SR 88
Cumberland	Falmouth	55.22	88.87	Bucknam Road to I-295	
Cumberland	Falmouth	55.54	89.38	I-495 west (Falmouth Spur) to I-95 / Maine Turnpike – Lewiston, Kittery	
Cumberland	Cumberland	58.63	94.36	Tuttle Road to SR 88 – Cumberland Center, Cumberland Foreside	Grade-separated intersection
Cumberland	Yarmouth	59.78– 59.95	96.21– 96.48	I-295 – Freeport, Portland	Exit 15 on I-295
Cumberland	Yarmouth	61.04	98.23	SR 115	Interchange
Cumberland	Yarmouth	61.98	99.75	SR 88 south – Falmouth	Northern terminus of SR 88
Cumberland	Yarmouth	62.07– 62.25	99.89– 100.18	I-295 – Brunswick, Portland	Exit 17 on I-295
Cumberland	Freeport	65.63	105.62	Desert Road to I-295 – Brunswick, Augusta, Portland	Exit 20 on I-295
Cumberland	Freeport	67.17	108.10	SR 125 north / SR 136 north to I-295 – Durham	
Cumberland	Freeport	68.70	110.56	I-295 north	Exit 24 on I-295
Cumberland	Brunswick	73.93	118.98	I-295 – Freeport, Portland, Topsham, Augusta	Rotary
Cumberland	Brunswick	75.74	121.89	SR 24 south (Maine Street) / SR 123 south – Harpswell	Northbound signage; southern end of limited-access segment
Cumberland	Brunswick	75.74	121.89	US 201 north / SR 24 north – Topsham	Southbound signage
Cumberland	Brunswick	76.42	122.99	SR 196 west to SR 24 / I-295 – Topsham, Lewiston	Eastern terminus of SR 196, Southern end of wrong-way concurrency with SR 24
Cumberland	Brunswick	78.50	126.33	SR 24 – Cook's Corner, Brunswick Executive Airport, Orr's-Bailey Islands	Northern end of wrong-way concurrency with SR 24
Cumberland–Sagadahoc county line	Brunswick–West Bath line	81.16	130.61	New Meadows River	
Sagadahoc	West Bath	81.32	130.87	New Meadows Road – West Bath	
Sagadahoc	Bath	82.98	133.54	Congress Avenue / Richardson Street – Bath	Richardson street only appears on northbound signage; Bath only appears on southbound signage
Sagadahoc	Bath	83.57	134.49	SR 209 south – Phippsburg	Northbound signage; northern terminus of SR 209
Sagadahoc	Bath	84.15	135.43	To SR 209 south – Phippsburg, Bath	Southbound signage; access to Visitor Center
Sagadahoc	Bath–Woolwich line	84.29	135.65	Sagadahoc Bridge over the Kennebec River	
Sagadahoc	Woolwich	84.64	136.21	SR 127 south – Georgetown, Reid State Park, Arrowsic	Southern end of concurrency with SR 127; northern end of limited-access segment
Sagadahoc	Woolwich	84.93	136.68	SR 127 north	Northern end of concurrency with SR 127
Lincoln	Wiscasset	90.73	146.02	SR 144 – Westport	
Lincoln	Wiscasset	94.03	151.33	SR 27 north – Augusta, Gardiner	Southern end of wrong-way concurrency with SR 27
Lincoln	Wiscasset	94.31	151.78	SR 218	
Lincoln	Wiscasset–Edgecomb line	94.73	152.45	Sheepscot Bridge over the Sheepscot River	
Lincoln	Edgecomb	95.92	154.37	SR 27 south – Boothbay, Boothbay Harbor	Northern end of wrong-way concurrency with SR 27
Lincoln	Newcastle	101.12	162.74	US 1 Bus. to SR 129 / SR 130 / SR 215 – Pemaquid Point, Pemaquid Beach, Damariscotta, Bristol	Interchange; northbound exit and southbound entrance; southern terminus of US 1 Bus
Lincoln	Newcastle	102.11	164.33	SR 215 – Newcastle, Damariscotta, Damariscotta Mills	Interchange; southbound exit and northbound entrance
Lincoln	Damariscotta	104.03	167.42	US 1 Bus. – Bristol, South Bristol, Pemaquid, Pemaquid Point, Pemaquid Beach, Damariscotta	Northern terminus of US 1 Bus
Lincoln	Waldoboro	111.58	179.57	SR 32 – Waldoboro, Bremen, Jefferson	
Lincoln	Waldoboro	112.42	180.92	SR 220 – Friendship, Washington	
Lincoln	Waldoboro	113.34	182.40	SR 235 – Union, Hope	
Knox	Warren	118.01	189.92	SR 90 east – Camden, Rockport	Western terminus of SR 90
Knox	Warren	121.21	195.07	SR 97 (Cushing Road) – Friendship	
Knox	Thomaston	122.36	196.92	SR 131 north – Union	Southern end of wrong-way concurrency with SR 131
Knox	Thomaston	124.13	199.77	SR 131 south – St. George	Northern end of wrong-way concurrency with SR 131
Knox	Rockland	127.15	204.63	US 1A (Broadway)	Southern terminus of US 1A
Knox	Rockland	127.60	205.35	SR 73 south	Northern terminus of SR 73
Knox	Rockland	128.66	207.06	US 1A / SR 17 (Maverick Street) – Thomaston, Union	Northern terminus of US 1A
Knox	Rockport	133.83	215.38	SR 90 west – Warren	Eastern terminus of SR 90
Knox	Camden	135.77	218.50	SR 105 – Hope, Appleton	
Knox	Camden	135.98	218.84	SR 52 – Lincolnville Center	
Waldo	Lincolnville	141.59	227.87	SR 173 (Beach Road / McKay Road)	
Waldo	Belfast	153.89	247.66	SR 52 – Lincolnville Center	
Waldo	Belfast	154.30	248.32	SR 3 west – Belfast, Augusta	Interchange; southern end of concurrency with SR 3
Waldo	Belfast	154.80– 155.11	249.13– 249.63	SR 7 / SR 137 – Belfast, Brooks, Freedom	Interchange; southbound exit and northbound entrance via High Street
Waldo	Belfast	155.32	249.96	Passagassawakeag River	
Waldo	Belfast	155.60	250.41	SR 141 – Swanville	
Waldo	Stockton Springs	165.03	265.59	US 1A – Winterport, Bangor	Southern terminus of US 1A
Waldo	Prospect	171.14	275.42	SR 174 – Fort Knox	
Waldo–Hancock county line	Prospect–Verona Island line	171.33	275.73	Penobscot Narrows Bridge over the Penobscot River	
Hancock	Bucksport	172.71	277.95	SR 15 north – Bucksport, Bangor	Southern end of wrong-way concurrency with SR 15
Hancock	Orland	173.86	279.80	SR 46 – Dedham, East Holden	
Hancock	Orland	174.48	280.80	SR 166 – Orland, Castine	
Hancock	Orland	177.11	285.03	SR 15 south – Penobscot, Blue Hill, Deer Isle	Northern end of wrong-way concurrency with SR 15
Hancock	Orland	181.29	291.76	SR 176 – Surry	
Hancock	Ellsworth	191.65	308.43	SR 172 – Blue Hill, Surry	
Hancock	Ellsworth	191.85	308.75	SR 230 (Water Street)	
Hancock	Ellsworth	192.13	309.20	US 1A – Bangor	Northern terminus of US 1A
Hancock	Ellsworth	193.16	310.86	SR 3 east – Bar Harbor, Acadia National Park	Northern end of concurrency with SR 3
Hancock	Ellsworth	194.03	312.26	SR 184 – Lamoine	
Hancock	Hancock	197.86	318.42	SR 182 – Cherryfield	
Hancock	Sullivan	204.32	328.82	SR 200 – Franklin	
Hancock	Sullivan	205.31	330.41	SR 185 – Sorrento	
Hancock	Sullivan	206.90	332.97	SR 183 – Tunk Lake	
Hancock	Gouldsboro	210.35	338.53	SR 186 – Winter Harbor, Birch Harbor	
Hancock	Gouldsboro	211.60	340.54	SR 195 – Prospect Harbor, Corea	
Hancock	Gouldsboro	213.51	343.61	SR 186 – Prospect Harbor, Winter Harbor, Birch Harbor	
Washington	Milbridge	223.81	360.19	US 1A – Calais, Machias, Harrington	Southern terminus of US 1A
Washington	Cherryfield	228.78	368.19	SR 182 – Franklin, Ellsworth	
Washington	Cherryfield	228.95	368.46	SR 193 – Deblois	
Washington	Harrington	235.54	379.06	US 1A – Milbridge, Ellsworth	Northern terminus of US 1A
Washington	Columbia Falls	241.13	388.06	SR 187 – Addison, Jonesport, Beals	
Washington	Jonesboro	246.97	397.46	SR 187 – Jonesport, Beals Island	
Washington	Jonesboro	250.08	402.46	US 1A – Whitneyville	Southern terminus of US 1A
Washington	Machias	255.77	411.62	SR 92 – Machiasport	
Washington	Machias	255.92	411.86	SR 192 (Colonial Way) – Wesley	
Washington	Machias	256.34	412.54	US 1A – Whitneyville	Northern terminus of US 1A
Washington	East Machias	260.15	418.67	SR 191 north – Baring Plantation	Southern end of wrong-way concurrency with SR 191
Washington	East Machias	260.24	418.82	SR 191 south – Cutler	Northern end of wrong-way concurrency with SR 191
Washington	Whiting	272.87	439.14	SR 189 – Lubec	
Washington	Dennysville	282.27	454.27	SR 86 – Dennysville	
Washington	Pembroke	286.72	461.43	SR 214 – Meddybemps	
Washington	Perry	293.32	472.05	SR 190 – Pleasant Point, Eastport	
Washington	Calais	313.82	505.04	SR 9 east – St. Stephen NB, International Bridge	Southern end of concurrency with SR 9
Washington	Calais	316.00	508.55	International Avenue to Route 1 – St. Stephen, St. John	
Washington	Baring	319.48	514.15	SR 191 – Machias	
Washington	Baileyville	320.73	516.16	SR 9 west – Bangor	Northern end of concurrency with SR 9
Washington	Topsfield	350.08	563.40	SR 6 – Lincoln, Vanceboro, St. Croix NB, Springfield	
Washington	Danforth	370.51	596.28	SR 169 – Prentiss, Springfield	
Aroostook	Houlton	404.43	650.87	US 2 east – Woodstock NB	Southern end of concurrency with US 2
Aroostook	Houlton	404.50	650.98	US 2A – Bangor	
Aroostook	Houlton	404.79	651.45	US 2 west – Island Falls	Northern end of concurrency with US 2
Aroostook	Houlton	405.54– 405.68	652.65– 652.88	I-95 – New Brunswick, Canada, Bangor	Exit 302 on I-95; the northernmost interchange between US 1 and I-95
Aroostook	Mars Hill	432.00	695.24	US 1A – Fort Fairfield	Southern terminus of US 1A
Aroostook	Presque Isle	446.24	718.15	SR 10 – Easton	
Aroostook	Presque Isle	446.87	719.17	SR 167 – Fort Fairfield	
Aroostook	Presque Isle	447.73	720.55	SR 163 to SR 167 / SR 227 – Fort Fairfield, Ashland	
Aroostook	Presque Isle	448.07	721.10	SR 164 – Washburn	
Aroostook	Caribou	455.76	733.47	SR 164 to SR 228 – Caribou	
Aroostook	Caribou	458.63	738.09	SR 161 south / SR 161B (Fort Street) – Fort Fairfield	Southern end of concurrency with SR 161
Aroostook	Caribou	459.20	739.01	SR 89 west to SR 164 / SR 228 / SR 161B – Caribou	Southern end of concurrency with SR 89
Aroostook	Caribou	459.67	739.77	SR 161 north – Van Buren	Northern end of concurrency with SR 161
Aroostook	Caribou	459.89	740.12	SR 89 east – Limestone	Northern end of concurrency with SR 89
Aroostook	Caribou	461.34	742.45	SR 161	Grade-separated intersection
Aroostook	Van Buren	481.06	774.19	US 1A – Limestone	Northern terminus of US 1A
Aroostook	Frenchville	513.06	825.69	SR 162 – St. Agatha	
Aroostook	Fort Kent	524.97	844.86	SR 161 south – Caribou	Southern end of concurrency with SR 161
Aroostook	Fort Kent	525.48	845.68	SR 11 (Pleasant Street)	
Aroostook	Fort Kent	525.92	846.39	SR 161 north – Allagash	Northern end of concurrency with SR 161
Aroostook	Fort Kent	526.05	846.60	Route 161 north – Clair; Route 205 west – Saint-François-de-Madawaska	Continuation beyond Fort Kent–Clair Border Crossing on the Clair–Fort Kent Bridge over Saint John River into New Brunswick; northern terminus of US 1
1.000 mi = 1.609 km; 1.000 km = 0.621 mi: Concurrency terminus; Incomplete access; Tolled

U.S. Route 1
Previous state: New Hampshire	Maine	Next state: Terminus
