= Maine State Route 195 =

State highway in Hancock County, Maine, US

State Route 195

Route information
- Maintained by MaineDOT
- Length: 8.09 mi (13.02 km)
- Existed: 1925–present

Major junctions
- South end: Crowley Island Road in Gouldsboro
- SR 186 in Gouldsboro
- North end: US 1 in Gouldsboro

Location
- Country: United States
- State: Maine
- Counties: Hancock

Highway system
- Maine State Highway System; Interstate; US; State; Auto trails; Lettered highways
← I-195	→ SR 196

State Route 195 (SR 195) is part of Maine's system of numbered state highways. It runs entirely in the town of Gouldsboro for a length of 8.09 miles (13.02 km). It travels from an intersection with Corea Road and Crowley Island Road in Corea to an intersection with U.S. Route 1 (US 1).

The route is notable due to not being renumbered or decommissioned after the Interstate Highway System was installed, as was the case with State Route 95.

== Major junctions ==
The entire route is in Gouldsboro, Hancock County.

mi	km	Destinations	Notes
0.00	0.00	Corea Road / Crowley Island Road	
3.06	4.92	SR 186 north (West Bay Road)	Southern end of SR 186 concurrency
3.20	5.15	SR 186 south (Main Street) – Birch Harbor, Winter Harbor, Acadia National Park, Schoodic	Northern end of SR 186 concurrency
8.09	13.02	US 1 – Ellsworth, Machias	
1.000 mi = 1.609 km; 1.000 km = 0.621 mi: Concurrency terminus
