= Maine State Route 184 =

State highway in Hancock County, Maine, US

State Route 184

Route information
- Maintained by MaineDOT
- Length: 8.54 mi (13.74 km)
- Existed: 1925–present

Major junctions
- South end: Dead end in Lamoine
- SR 204 in Lamoine
- North end: US 1 in Ellsworth

Location
- Country: United States
- State: Maine
- Counties: Hancock

Highway system
- Maine State Highway System; Interstate; US; State; Auto trails; Lettered highways
← SR 183	→ SR 185

State Route 184 (SR 184) is part of Maine's system of numbered state highways, located in Hancock County. It runs from a dead end in Lamoine to U.S. Route 1 (US 1) in Ellsworth. It also has a short concurrency with SR 204 in Lamoine. The route is 8.5 miles (13.7 km) long.

== Route description ==
The southern end of SR 184 is at a beach along the Eastern Bay (a subset of Frenchman Bay). The state highway heads west along Lamoine Beach Road passing numerous houses and access roads to beachside houses. It also passes the entrance to Lamoine Beach State Park. The road starts to head in a more northwesterly direction until it reaches Lamoine Center where the road heads due west past a school, a fire department, and a church. At Shore Road, the state route curves sharply to the north and its name changes to Douglas Highway. It now parallels the Jordan River where the road passes many small businesses and sand pits. SR 184 shares a 300-foot-long (91 m) concurrency with SR 204 in this area. After the concurrency, the road passes the town offices of Lamoine and begins to start curving to the northeast. SR 184 enters the city of Ellsworth but ends shortly thereafter at US 1 about two miles (3.2 km) southeast of the downtown area.

== Junction list ==
The entire route is in Hancock County.

Location	mi	km	Destinations	Notes
Lamoine	0.00	0.00	Dead end	
Lamoine	5.61	9.03	SR 204 west (Jordan River Road) to SR 3 – Bar Harbor	Southern end of SR 204 concurrency
Lamoine	5.67	9.12	SR 204 east (Pinkhams Flats Road) – Marlboro	Northern end of SR 204 concurrency
Ellsworth	8.54	13.74	US 1 (Downeast Highway) – Ellsworth, Machias	
1.000 mi = 1.609 km; 1.000 km = 0.621 mi: Concurrency terminus
