= Maine State Route 223 =

State highway in Aroostook County, Maine, US

State Route 223
- Noyes Road

Route information
- Maintained by MaineDOT
- Length: 6.44 mi (10.36 km)
- Existed: 1931–present

Major junctions
- West end: SR 89 in Caribou
- East end: US 1A in Limestone

Location
- Country: United States
- State: Maine
- Counties: Aroostook

Highway system
- Maine State Highway System; Interstate; US; State; Auto trails; Lettered highways
| ← SR 222 | → SR 224 |

State Route 223 (SR 223) is a state highway located in Aroostook County in extreme northeastern Maine. It begins at SR 89 in Caribou and runs east to U.S. Route 1A (US 1A) in Limestone. SR 223 parallels SR 89 running east into the town of Limestone, but bypasses the downtown area to the south. For the entire 6.44-mile (10.36 km) length, the route is known as Noyes Road.

== Route description ==
SR 223 begins at SR 89 in the Caribou settlement of Madawaska. It first heads northeast but curves to the south to cross the Little Madawaska River. It passes a few houses before curving to the east where it passes more houses. After exiting the city of Caribou towards the town of Limestone, SR 223 curves to the southeast before returning to an easterly heading. The highway passes through a mix of farmland and wooded areas; some houses are found along this stretch of the highway, more so as it enters the settlement of Four Corners. Just east of Four Corners, SR 223 ends at US 1A, 1.5 miles (2.4 km) west of the Canadian border.

The road continues east as unnumbered Blake Road, which bypasses downtown Limestone to the east, connecting to SR 229 near the Gillespie Portage Border Crossing.

== History ==
When first designated in 1931, the western terminus of SR 223 was at US 1 (modern SR 164) in downtown Caribou at the intersection of High Street and Main Street. The highway followed entirely new routing from downtown to the current terminus at US 1A (then SR 165). In 1953, SR 89 was extended west to downtown Caribou along existing SR 223. The latter highway was truncated to its current terminus and its alignment has not changed since.

== Junction list ==
The entire route is in Aroostook County.

| Location | mi | km | Destinations | Notes |
|---|---|---|---|---|
| Caribou | 0.00 | 0.00 | SR 89 (Access Highway) – Caribou, Limestone | Western terminus |
| Limestone | 6.44 | 10.36 | US 1A (Main Street) / Blake Road | Eastern terminus |
1.000 mi = 1.609 km; 1.000 km = 0.621 mi
