= Maine State Route 10 =

State highway in Aroostook County, Maine, US

State Route 10

Route information
- Maintained by MaineDOT
- Length: 9.28 mi (14.93 km)
- Existed: 1940–present

Major junctions
- West end: US 1 in Presque Isle
- East end: US 1A in Easton

Location
- Country: United States
- State: Maine
- Counties: Aroostook

Highway system
- Maine State Highway System; Interstate; US; State; Auto trails; Lettered highways
← SR 9	→ SR 11

State Route 10 (abbreviated SR 10) is a part of Maine's system of numbered state highways, located in the extreme northern part of the state near the Canada–US border. It is a secondary highway which runs for 9.3 miles (15.0 km) between U.S. Route 1 (US 1) in Presque Isle and US 1A in Easton. Along with US 1A between Easton and Mars Hill, it comprises a former route of US 1.

SR 10 is signed as an east-west highway but follows an odd staircase-shaped alignment.

== Route description ==
SR 10 begins in Presque Isle at the corner of Main and Academy Streets and heads southeast through the town. At its intersection with Conant Road, the highway curves south and becomes Center Line Road. After heading south, the route curves east once more and becomes Easton Road. SR 10 continues east, south, then east again before entering Easton. The highway continues eastward to meet its eastern terminus at US 1A, just two miles (3.2 km) west of the Canada–US border.

The roadway continues east as Ladner Road, which runs to the Easton/River de Chute border crossing and ultimately connects with New Brunswick Route 560.

SR 10 is known as Academy Street and Center Line Road in Presque Isle and Center Road in Easton.

== History ==
SR 10 is a former alignment of US 1 through Presque Isle and Easton Center.

In 1940, US 1 was moved onto its current routing (which was US 1A from 1936–40). The US 1A designation was then applied to most of the old US 1 routing, effectively swapping the two routes. An orphaned section of old US 1 through Easton Center was left, however, and was designated SR 10.

== Junction list ==
The entire route is in Aroostook County.

Location	mi	km	Destinations	Notes
Presque Isle	0.00	0.00	US 1 to SR 167 (Main Street)	Western terminus
Easton	9.28	14.93	US 1A (Houlton Road) – Fort Fairfield, Mars Hill	Eastern terminus
1.000 mi = 1.609 km; 1.000 km = 0.621 mi
