= Maine State Route 183 =

State highway in Hancock County, Maine, US

State Route 183
- Tunk Lake Road

Route information
- Maintained by MaineDOT
- Length: 4.33 mi (6.97 km)

Major junctions
- South end: US 1 in Sullivan
- North end: Schoodic Beach Road in Sullivan

Location
- Country: United States
- State: Maine
- Counties: Hancock

Highway system
- Maine State Highway System; Interstate; US; State; Auto trails; Lettered highways
← SR 182	→ SR 184

State Route 183 (SR 183) is a state highway in the U.S. state of Maine. It runs from U.S. Route 1 (US 1) to Schoodic Beach Road entirely within the town of Sullivan, Hancock County. The total length is 4 1/3 miles (7.0 km).

== Route description ==
SR 183 begins at US 1 within the community of East Sullivan. The route, known as Tunk Lake Road for its entire length, heads northeast through a mostly forested area with numerous houses lining the road. It makes a turn to the east at an unpaved fire road but eventually curves back to the northeast. It intersects Flanders Pond Road which provides access to the water body of the same name. Before ending, SR 183 crosses the Down East Sunrise Trail, formerly a railroad line, within the community of Tunk Lake. The highway ends at Schoodic Beach Road which heads to the west and Tunk Lake Road continues north as a locally maintained road to Tunk Lake.

== Junction list ==
The entire route is in Sullivan, Hancock County.

mi	km	Destinations	Notes
0.00	0.00	US 1 / Town Landing Road – Gouldsboro, Milbridge, Sullivan, Ellsworth	
4.33	6.97	Schoodic Beach Road / Tunk Lake Road	
1.000 mi = 1.609 km; 1.000 km = 0.621 mi
