= Maine State Route 204 =

State highway in Hancock County, Maine, US

State Route 204

Route information
- Maintained by MaineDOT
- Length: 6.47 mi (10.41 km)
- Existed: 1936 (current routing)–present

Major junctions
- West end: SR 3 in Trenton
- SR 184 in Lamoine
- East end: Seal Point Road / Marlboro Beach Road in Lamoine

Location
- Country: United States
- State: Maine
- Counties: Hancock

Highway system
- Maine State Highway System; Interstate; US; State; Auto trails; Lettered highways
← US 202	→ SR 205

State Route 204 (SR 204) is part of Maine's system of numbered state highways, located in Hancock County. It runs from SR 3 in Trenton, passing SR 184 in Lamoine, and ending at the intersection with Seal Point and Marlboro Beach roads. The route is 6.5 miles (10.5 km) long.

== Route description ==
SR 204 begins at SR 3 in Trenton. It heads northeast, crossing into Lamoine. Then the route has a 300-foot-long (91 m) concurrency with SR 184 in Lamoine. After the concurrency, SR 204 is heading southeast towards Seal Point Road and Marlboro Beach Road, where the SR 204 designation ends.

== Junction list ==
The entire route is in Hancock County.

Location	mi	km	Destinations	Notes
Trenton	0.00	0.00	SR 3 (Bar Harbor Road)	
Lamoine	1.73	2.78	SR 184 south (Douglas Highway) – Lamoine Beach, Lamoine State Park	Western end of SR 184 concurrency
Lamoine	1.79	2.88	SR 184 north (Douglas Highway) to US 1 – Ellsworth	Eastern end of SR 184 concurrency
Lamoine	6.47	10.41	Seal Point Road / Marlboro Beach Road	
1.000 mi = 1.609 km; 1.000 km = 0.621 mi: Concurrency terminus
