= Maine State Route 89 =

State highway in Aroostook County, Maine, US

State Route 89

Route information
- Maintained by MaineDOT
- Length: 10.87 mi (17.49 km)
- Existed: 1946–present

Major junctions
- West end: SR 161B / SR 164 in Caribou
- US 1 / SR 161 in Caribou; SR 223 in Caribou
- East end: US 1A in Limestone

Location
- Country: United States
- State: Maine
- Counties: Aroostook

Highway system
- Maine State Highway System; Interstate; US; State; Auto trails; Lettered highways
← SR 88	→ SR 90

State Route 89 (SR 89) is part of Maine's system of numbered state highways. It runs 10.87 miles (17.49 km) from an intersection with SR 161B and SR 164 in Caribou to an intersection with U.S. Route 1A (US 1A) in Limestone. The route is also known as Access Highway (in Caribou) and Foster Avenue (in Limestone).

The road was designated as a service route for the now defunct Loring Air Force Base.

== Route description ==
SR 89 begins at a right-in/right-out intersection with Main Street in downtown Caribou. Main Street in this area carries the northbound lanes of SR 161B and the southbound lanes of SR 164. SR 89 heads east along the two-lane High Street passing numerous businesses and residences. At the intersection with US 1 and SR 161, SR 89 turns north onto the divided four-lane highway. First SR 161 exits the road onto a bypass of the city while US 1 exits the highway later on. Now named Access Highway, the road becomes undivided and two-lanes wide. It first passes businesses on its north side and small houses on the south side. After passing under the SR 161 expressway and a recreational trail paralleling the bypass, SR 89 heads northeast through a more rural area. At the settlement of Madawaska, the highway reaches the western terminus of SR 223 and crosses the Little Madawaska River.

At Sawyer Road, one of two main roads leading to the Loring Commerce Centre and Loring International Airport (formerly part of the Loring Air Force Base), SR 89 enters Limestone and curves to the east through a rural area. At Grass Corner, the highway passes the eastern access road to the former base. The road passes a small residential cluster at Albert Road before descending a hill with a second lane provided for westbound travelers. It slightly curves to the southeast and becoming Foster Avenue. Now entering the town center of Limestone, SR 89 passes a mix of houses and businesses before ending at US 1A which carries Main Street (to the south) and Van Buren Road (to the north). The intersection is located one block north of the western terminus of SR 229 which provides access to New Brunswick, Canada.

== Major junctions ==
The entire route is in Aroostook County.

Location	mi	km	Destinations	Notes
Caribou	0.00	0.00	SR 164 south / SR 161B north (Main Street) to SR 228 – New Sweden, Washburn	
Caribou	0.46	0.74	US 1 south / SR 161 south – Presque Isle	Western end of US 1 / SR 161 concurrencies
Caribou	0.93	1.50	SR 161 north – Van Buren	Eastern end of SR 161 concurrency
Caribou	1.15	1.85	US 1 north (Van Buren Road) – Van Buren	Eastern end of US 1 concurrency
Caribou	3.73	6.00	SR 223 east (Noyes Road)	Western terminus of SR 223
Limestone	10.87	17.49	US 1A (Van Buren Road / Main Street) – Van Buren, Fort Fairfield	
1.000 mi = 1.609 km; 1.000 km = 0.621 mi: Concurrency terminus
