= Jonesport (CDP), Maine =

Jonesport, Maine
- Census-designated place
- Location within Maine Location within the United States
- Coordinates: 44°31′49″N 67°36′35″W
- Country: United States
- State: Maine
- County: Washington
- Town: Jonesport

Area
  - Total: 2.22 sq mi (5.76 km^{2})
  - Land: 1.59 sq mi (4.13 km^{2})
  - Water: 0.63 sq mi (1.63 km^{2})
- Elevation: 52 ft (16 m)

Population (2020)
  - Total: 608
  - Density: 381.3/sq mi (147.24/km^{2})
- Time zone: UTC-5 (Eastern (EST))
  - Summer (DST): UTC-4 (EDT)
- ZIP Code: 04649
- Area code: 207
- FIPS code: 23-35975
- GNIS feature ID: 2806292

Jonesport is a census-designated place (CDP) comprising the villages of Jonesport and West Jonesport in the town of Jonesport, Washington County, Maine, United States. It is in southern Washington County, on the north shore of Moosabec Reach, a tidal channel separating the mainland from Beals Island. The town of Beals is to the south across the channel, connected to Jonesport by a road bridge.

Maine State Route 187 is Jonesport's Main Street. The highway leads northwest 11 miles (18 km) to U.S. Route 1 near Columbia Falls and northeast the same distance to Route 1 near Jonesboro.

Jonesport was first listed as a CDP prior to the 2020 census.

== Demographics ==
Historical population
Census	Pop.	Note	%±
2020	608		—
U.S. Decennial Census
