= Maine State Route 187 =

State highway in Washington County, Maine, US

State Route 187

Route information
- Maintained by MaineDOT
- Length: 22.87 mi (36.81 km)

Major junctions
- West end: US 1 in Columbia Falls
- East end: US 1 in Jonesboro

Location
- Country: United States
- State: Maine
- Counties: Washington

Highway system
- Maine State Highway System; Interstate; US; State; Auto trails; Lettered highways
← SR 186	→ SR 188

State Route 187 (SR 187) is a 22.83-mile-long (36.74 km) V-shaped state highway in Maine that connects to U.S. Route 1 (US 1) at both ends; in Columbia Falls (western) and Jonesboro (eastern). SR 187 serves as the thorough route to Jonesport.

== Major junctions ==
The entire route is in Washington County.

Location	mi	km	Destinations	Notes
Columbia Falls	0.00	0.00	US 1 (Harrington Road) – Harrington, Machias	
Jonesboro	22.87	36.81	US 1 (Harrington Road) – Ellsworth, Calais	
1.000 mi = 1.609 km; 1.000 km = 0.621 mi
