= Winter Harbor (CDP), Maine =

Winter Harbor, Maine
- Census-designated place
- Location within Maine Location within the United States
- Coordinates: 44°23′03″N 68°05′30″W
- Country: United States
- State: Maine
- County: Hancock
- Town: Winter Harbor

Area
  - Total: 2.17 sq mi (5.62 km^{2})
  - Land: 2.17 sq mi (5.62 km^{2})
  - Water: 0 sq mi (0.00 km^{2})
- Elevation: 39 ft (12 m)

Population (2020)
  - Total: 385
  - Density: 177.5/sq mi (68.54/km^{2})
- Time zone: UTC-5 (Eastern (EST))
  - Summer (DST): UTC-4 (EDT)
- ZIP code: 04693
- Area code: 207
- FIPS code: 23-86620
- GNIS feature ID: 2630702

Winter Harbor is a census-designated place (CDP) in the town of Winter Harbor in Hancock County, Maine, United States. The CDP population was 426 at the 2010 census, out of 516 people in the town as a whole.

== Geography ==
The Winter Harbor CDP serves as the principal village within the town of Winter Harbor, located on Mount Desert Island.It is situated at the northern end of the harbor of the same name, an arm on the east side of Frenchman Bay. Maine State Route 186 is the primary road through the community. The CDP extends east along Route 186 to Moore Road, the western entrance to the loop road around the Schoodic Peninsula. To the north, the CDP includes the small community of Gerrishville. The CDP is bordered to the west by Frenchman Bay and extends south to include all of Grindstone Neck between Frenchman Bay and the Winter Harbor inlet. Route 186 leads north 6 miles (10 km) to U.S. Route 1 at West Gouldsboro and east 4 miles (6 km) to Prospect Harbor.

According to the United States Census Bureau, the Winter Harbor CDP has an area of 2.2 square miles (5.6 km^{2}), all land.

== Demographics ==
Historical population
| Census | Pop. | Note | %± |
|---|---|---|---|
| 2020 | 385 | | — |
U.S. Decennial Census
