= Lobster Institute =

Research and outreach center

- Established: 1987
- Founder: Dr. Robert Bayer
- Type: Research and outreach center
- Purpose: Sustainability of American lobster fisheries
- Location: Darling Marine Center, University of Maine
- Website: Lobster Institute website

The Lobster Institute is a research and outreach center in the College of Earth, Life and Health Sciences at the University of Maine that focuses on research and promoting the sustainability of American lobster (Homarus americanus) fisheries in the United States and Canada. The center is currently led by executive director Chris Cash, a former commercial lobster fisherman with extensive experience in non-profit management. From 2018 - 2023 the center was led by Richard Wahle, PhD, a research professor in the School of Marine Sciences. Prior to Wahle the Lobster Institute was founded and led by Dr. Bob Bayer with support from assistant director, Cathy Billings. The Lobster Institute’s office is based in Darling Marine Center in the University of Maine.

== Overview ==
The center has been in operations since 1987. According to the center, the state of Maine is responsible for contributing around 80% of American lobster exports from the United States since 2015. It has focused on research on American lobsters pertaining to topics such as environmental effects of lobster fisheries, lobster immune systems, species resilience in the face of climate change. Their board of advisors tends to be composed of representatives from fishermen's and lobstermen’s associations, lobster companies, and lobster researchers.

Since 2018, Lobster Institute has outlined three strategic goals that govern how it operates.:

1. To be the University of Maine’s center for information and opportunities in lobster research, through engaging with stakeholders to determine the type of lobster research that needs to be prioritized based on the current needs of all parties involved.
2. To enhance faculty and student incentives to engage with stakeholders, through increasing access to research funding and facilitating researchers with access to industry and fisheries.
3. To increase outreach and visibility to stakeholders through traditional and new media, through providing workshops and forums to educate the public about research and information regarding the American lobster.

== Lobster College ==
The Lobster College is a four-day-long educational program held in Prospect Harbor, Maine. The college has been held every year since 2001. It was founded by Dr. Robert Bayer via the Lobster Institute, and a local innkeeper, to help educate tourists and the general public about lobsters, lobstering, and the effects of the lobster industry on the state economy. Lecturers include academics, lobster fishermen, and others involved in the seafood industry such as restaurant owners.
