= Maine State Route 205 =

State highway in Aroostook County, Maine, US

State Route 205

Route information
- Maintained by MaineDOT
- Length: 10.69 mi (17.20 km)

Major junctions
- South end: SR 167 in Presque Isle
- North end: SR 161 in Caribou

Location
- Country: United States
- State: Maine
- Counties: Aroostook

Highway system
- Maine State Highway System; Interstate; US; State; Auto trails; Lettered highways
| ← SR 204 | → SR 206 |

State Route 205 (SR 205) is part of Maine's system of numbered state highways, located in Aroostook County. It runs from SR 167 in Presque Isle to SR 161 in Caribou, running parallel with and to the east of Aroostook River.

== Junction list ==
The entire route is in Aroostook County.

| Location | mi | km | Destinations | Notes |
|---|---|---|---|---|
| Presque Isle | 0.00 | 0.00 | SR 167 (Fort Fairfield Road) – Fort Fairfield, Presque Isle | |
| Caribou | 10.69 | 17.20 | SR 161 (Fort Fairfield Road) / River Road – Caribou, Fort Fairfield | |
1.000 mi = 1.609 km; 1.000 km = 0.621 mi
