= Lobster Fishermen (Marsden Hartley) =

Painting by Marsden Hartley

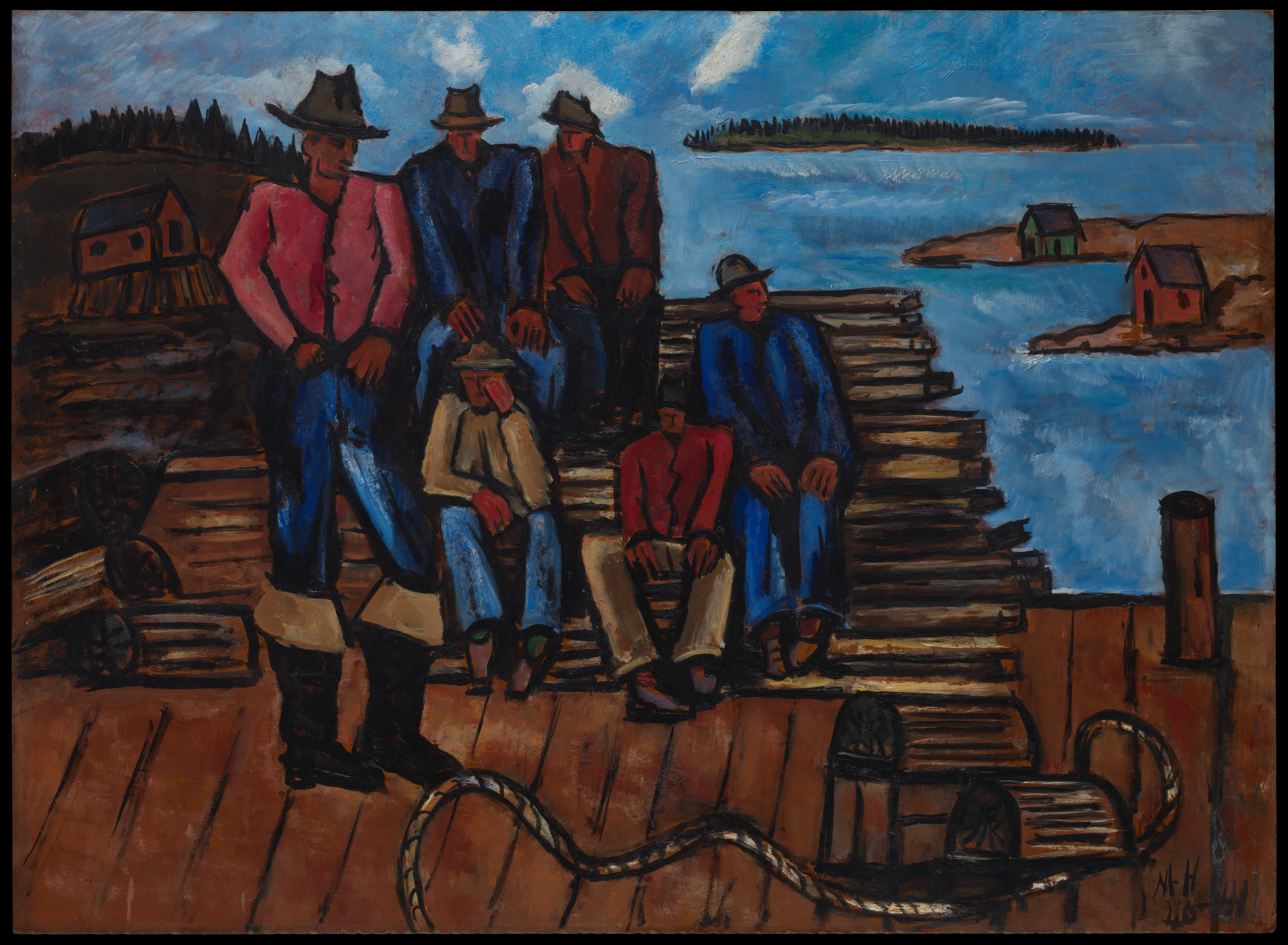
- Artist: Marsden Hartley
- Year: 1940-1941
- Medium: Oil on hardboard (masonite)
- Dimensions: 75.6 cm × 103.8 cm (29.8 in × 40.9 in)
- Location: Metropolitan Museum of Art, New York

Lobster Fishermen is an early 20th century painting by American artist Marsden Hartley. Done in oil on masonite, it depicts a group of lobster fishermen in Hartley's native state of Maine. Considered part of Hartley's 'Maine Series', it is in the collection of the Metropolitan Museum of Art.

== Description ==
=== Background ===
Born in Lewiston, Maine, Hartley left his home state in the early 20th century to start his career as an artist. After some successes and failures, he returned to his native Maine in 1937, and quickly established himself as one of the foremost painters in and of the state. Having lived in cities for much of his life, he was comforted by the relative isolation that his residence in Maine provided him; this respect came to be represented in much of his work, many of which depict Maine's rugged landscapes and people.

Marsden's return to Maine coincided with the rise of the Folk Art movement. Marsden developed a self-consciously "primitive" style of painting that is present in his Maine paintings, including Lobster Fishermen.

=== Painting ===
Lobster Fishermen itself depicts a group of lobster fishermen (participants in Maine's iconic lobster industry) posed on a dock. The painting was rendered by Hartley in 1940-41 while the artist was occupying an abandoned church in the fishing village of Corea, Maine. The Metropolitan Museum of Art's profile of the piece notes that Lobster Fishermen is similar to Paul Cézanne's painting series The Card Players.

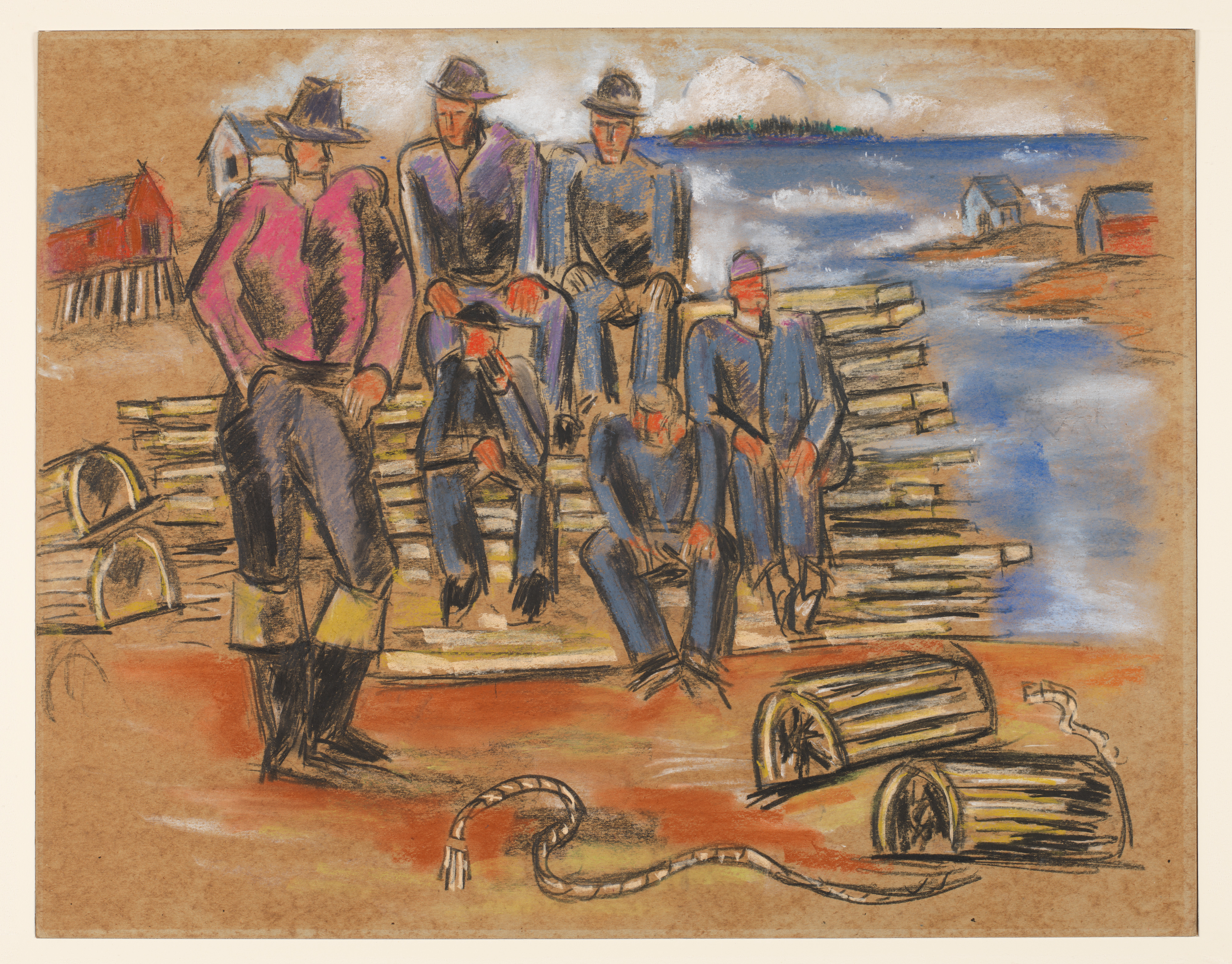
Study for Lobster Fishermen, painted by Hartley in 1940

A study (produced in 1940) for Lobster Fishermen is also in the Met's collection.
