= Maine State Route 186 =

State highway in Hancock County, Maine, US

State Route 186

Route information
- Maintained by MaineDOT
- Length: 16.00 mi (25.75 km)
- Existed: 1925–present

Major junctions
- West end: US 1 in Gouldsboro
- SR 195 in Gouldsboro
- East end: US 1 in Gouldsboro

Location
- Country: United States
- State: Maine
- Counties: Hancock

Highway system
- Maine State Highway System; Interstate; US; State; Auto trails; Lettered highways
← SR 185	→ SR 187

State Route 186 (SR 186) is a sixteen-mile-long (26 km) state highway in south central Maine. The highway serves the town of Gouldsboro, running in a half-loop from U.S. Route 1 (US 1), south and east along the southern coast to Winter Harbor near Frenchman Bay, and then returning to US 1.

== Major junctions ==
The entire route is in Hancock County.

Location	mi	km	Destinations	Notes
Gouldsboro	0.00	0.00	US 1	
Gouldsboro	10.82	17.41	SR 195 north (Pond Road)	Western end of SR 195 concurrency
Gouldsboro	10.98	17.67	SR 195 south (Corea Road) – Corea	Eastern end of SR 195 concurrency
Gouldsboro	16.00	25.75	US 1 / Old Route One – Ellsworth, Milbridge	
1.000 mi = 1.609 km; 1.000 km = 0.621 mi: Concurrency terminus
