= List of places in Maine =

Lists of places in Maine may be found:

- List of municipalities in Maine – cities, towns, plantations
- List of census-designated places in Maine
- List of unorganized territories in Maine
- List of counties in Maine
- American Indian reservations:
  - Houlton Band of Maliseet Indians
  - Mi'kmaq Nation
  - Passamaquoddy Indian Township Reservation
  - Passamaquoddy Pleasant Point Reservation
  - Penobscot Nation
