= Maine State Route 190 =

State highway in Washington County, Maine, US

State Route 190

Route information
- Maintained by MaineDOT
- Length: 7.10 mi (11.43 km)

Major junctions
- South end: Water Street in Eastport
- North end: US 1 in Perry

Location
- Country: United States
- State: Maine
- Counties: Washington

Highway system
- Maine State Highway System; Interstate; US; State; Auto trails; Lettered highways
| ← SR 189 | → SR 191 |

State Route 190 (SR 190) is a 7.1-mile (11.4 km) state highway that travels from Water Street in Eastport to U.S. Route 1 (US 1) in Perry. It serves as the connector route to Eastport from the mainland. Though the road travels in a southeast–northwesterly direction, the road is signed as north–south.

== Route descriptions ==
The state highway begins at the intersection of Water Street and Washington Street in downtown Eastport. Immediately around this intersection are businesses and the city's post office. SR 190 heads west along Washington Street where it passes numerous houses, churches, and other community buildings. At County Road and Deep Cove Road (the latter of which provides access to Eastport Municipal Airport), SR 190 curves to the north and travels along County Road. The setting becomes more rural and heads in a more northwesterly direction at Clark Street. The road skirts around the east side of Quoddy, a settlement within the city of Eastport. It exits Moose Island on a causeway to briefly travel on Carlow Island before exiting Eastport on another causeway. At this point, the road travels through Passamaquoddy Pleasant Point Reservation and the community of Pleasant Point. SR 190 is now on the mainland and heads northeast through the reservation. It then enters the town of Perry and heads through a mix of residences and woods. The road ends at a T-intersection with US 1 in a rural area southwest of the town center.

== Major junctions ==
The entire route is in Washington County.

| Location | mi | km | Destinations | Notes |
|---|---|---|---|---|
| Eastport | 0.00 | 0.00 | Water Street | |
| Perry | 7.10 | 11.43 | US 1 (South River Road) | |
1.000 mi = 1.609 km; 1.000 km = 0.621 mi
