= Birch Harbor, Maine =

- Village
- Location within Maine
- Coordinates: 44°23′19″N 68°02′14″W
- Country: United States
- State: Maine
- County: Hancock
- Town: Gouldsboro
- Elevation: 30 ft (9.1 m)
- Time zone: UTC-5 (Eastern (EST))
  - Summer (DST): UTC-4 (EDT)
- ZIP code: 04613
- Area code: 207
- GNIS feature ID: 562288

Birch Harbor is an unincorporated village in the town of Gouldsboro, Hancock County, Maine, United States. The community is located along Maine State Route 186, 22 miles (35 km) east-southeast of Ellsworth. Birch Harbor has a post office with ZIP code 04613, which opened on March 26, 1880.

== Education ==
It is in the Regional School Unit 24. The zoned elementary school is Peninsula School in Prospect Park. The district's secondary schools, Sumner Middle School and Sumner Memorial High School, are a part of the Sumner Learning Campus in Sullivan.
