= Jordan River (Maine) =

- Location within Maine Location within the United States

Location
- Country: United States

Physical characteristics
- Source
  - location: Maine
  - coordinates: 44.4977778°N 68.3583333°W
- Mouth
  - coordinates: 44.4442447°N 68.3430728°W

The Jordan River is a 5-mile-long (8 km) tidal river in Hancock County, Maine, flowing to Mount Desert Narrows, the waterway that separates Mount Desert Island from the mainland. The Jordan River forms the boundary between the towns of Lamoine and Trenton.

== See also ==
- List of rivers of Maine
