= Robert Bayer =

Researcher of lobster nutrition

Robert Bayer is a US researcher of lobster nutrition, management, and pathology.

== Career ==
Since 2018, he is serving as the chief science officer at Lobster Unlimited, a company that is creating value-added products from lobster processing waste byproducts. From 1995 to 2018, he served as the executive director of The Lobster Institute at the University of Maine,

Bayer is an alumnus of the University of Vermont, where he received his bachelor's and master's degree, and Michigan State University, where he received his doctoral degree. He is also a professor emeritus of Animal and Veterinary Sciences at the University of Maine. He holds several research patents, including one for gaffkemia vaccine and another one for the application of lobster hemolymph to treat mammalian tissue lesions.
