= Damariscotta (CDP), Maine =

Damariscotta, Maine
- Census-designated place
- Location in Lincoln County and the state of Maine
- Coordinates: 44°01′24″N 69°31′18″W
- Country: United States
- State: Maine
- County: Lincoln
- Town: Damariscotta

Area
  - Total: 4.13 sq mi (10.70 km^{2})
  - Land: 3.46 sq mi (8.95 km^{2})
  - Water: 0.68 sq mi (1.75 km^{2})
- Elevation: 85 ft (26 m)

Population (2020)
  - Total: 1,193
  - Density: 345.1/sq mi (133.26/km^{2})
- Time zone: UTC-5 (Eastern (EST))
  - Summer (DST): UTC-4 (EDT)
- ZIP code: 04543
- Area code: 207
- FIPS code: 23-16200
- GNIS feature ID: 2652331
- Website: www.damariscottame.com

Damariscotta is a census-designated place (CDP) comprising the main village of the town of Damariscotta in Lincoln County, Maine, United States. The population was 1,142 at the 2010 census, out of 2,218 in the entire town. In the 2000 census, the village was part of the Damariscotta-Newcastle CDP.

== Geography ==
The Damariscotta CDP occupies the western part of the town of Damariscotta in central Lincoln County. The CDP extends south to the town boundary with Bristol, and the western edge of the CDP is the center of the Damariscotta River, which forms the border with the town of Newcastle. The CDP extends north to U.S. Route 1 and east to a power line, or approximately Heater Road.

U.S. Route 1 Business runs through the center of Damariscotta as Main Street. The main US 1 bypasses Damariscotta to the north. US 1 leads northeast 25 miles (40 km) to Rockland and southwest 18 miles (29 km) to Bath. Portland is 52 miles (84 km) to the southwest. Maine Routes 129 and 130 have their northern terminus in Damariscotta. Leaving the community to the south together, they split in the northern part of the town of Bristol, with ME 129 leading south-southwest 13 miles (21 km) to South Bristol and ME 130 leading south-southeast 14 miles (23 km) to Pemaquid Point.

According to the United States Census Bureau, the Damariscotta CDP has a total area of 4.1 square miles (10.7 km^{2}), of which 3.46 square miles (8.95 km^{2}) are land and 0.68 square miles (1.75 km^{2}), or 16.36%, are water.

== Demographics ==
Historical population
Census	Pop.	Note	%±
2020	1,193		—
U.S. Decennial Census
