= Machias Memorial High School =

- Machias Memorial High School in 2007

Location
- 1 Bulldog Lane; Machias, Washington, Maine 04654; United States; 44°42′50″N 67°28′09″W

Information
- School type: Public
- Established: 1850; 176 years ago
- School district: AOS 96
- Superintendent: Scott Porter
- Principal: Nicole Case
- Grades: 9–12
- Colors: Orange and black
- Mascot: Bones, the bulldog
- Team name: Bulldogs
- Yearbook: Margaretta
- Website: www.mmhsbulldogs.org

Machias Memorial High School (MMHS) is a public secondary school (grades 9–12) located in Machias, Maine, United States. The school was originally established in 1850 as Machias High School, and was later renamed to honor students and alumni who died while serving in the military.

The school is a member of Alternative Organization Structure (AOS) 96. MMHS students are residents of Machias as well as the neighboring towns of Jonesboro, Marshfield, Northfield, Roque Bluffs, Wesley, Whitneyville, East Machias, Machiasport, Cutler, and Whiting.

The school mascot is a bulldog, and the school colors are orange and black. The school yearbook, the Margaretta, is named after HMS Margaretta, a British schooner captured on the Machias River during the American Revolutionary War.

== History ==
In 2010 the high school in Lubec closed, with Machias taking some of the students. Its enrollment generally increased after that. In the 2021-2022 school year, there were about 162 students, and then in the next year it was 178, the highest count in a 10 year period.

== News and initiatives ==
MMHS was selected to participate in a five-year high school initiative called Models, Networks and Policies to Support and Sustain Rigor and Relevance for ALL Students, supported by the Bill & Melinda Gates Foundation.

== Sports ==
MMHS competes in the Eastern Division of Class D high school sports. The Bulldogs hold a number of state and regional championship titles, including soccer, basketball (boys), and cheerleading titles. MMHS offers many sports. These sports include Girls' Volleyball (Class B), Co-ed Cross Country (Class C), and Soccer in the fall, Boys' Basketball, Girls' Basketball and Cheering in the winter, and in the spring Baseball and Softball.
