= Maine State Route 167 =

State highway in Aroostook County, Maine, US

State Route 167

Route information
- Maintained by MaineDOT
- Length: 8.49 mi (13.66 km)
- Existed: 1925–present

Major junctions
- South end: US 1 in Presque Isle
- North end: US 1A in Fort Fairfield

Location
- Country: United States
- State: Maine
- Counties: Aroostook

Highway system
- Maine State Highway System; Interstate; US; State; Auto trails; Lettered highways
← SR 166	→ SR 168

State Route 167 (SR 167) is part of Maine's system of numbered state highways. It runs 8 1/2 miles (13.7 km) from an intersection with U.S. Route 1 (US 1A) in Presque Isle to a junction with US 1A in Fort Fairfield.

The route was originally designated in 1925, and ran between Lincoln and the Canada–United States border at Vanceboro. In 1936, the number was given to a route between Presque Isle and Fort Fairfield. At the time, SR 167 shared part of its alignment with SR 163, but was eventually moved to its own route. In 1940, with the designation of US 1A over an old section of SR 161, the orphaned section of SR 161 between Fort Fairfield and the border was renumbered to SR 167. The pavement entered Canada as New Brunswick Route 190. SR 161 has since been returned to its original routing past Fort Fairfield therefore truncating SR 167 to US 1A.

== Major junctions ==
The entire route is in Aroostook County.

Location	mi	km	Destinations	Notes
Presque Isle	0.00	0.00	US 1 (Main Street)	
Presque Isle	0.93	1.50	SR 163 west (Maysville Street) – Caribou, Ashland	Eastern terminus of SR 163
Presque Isle	3.46	5.57	SR 205 north (Parkhurst Siding Road) – Caribou	Southern terminus of SR 205
Fort Fairfield	8.49	13.66	US 1A (Houlton Road) – Fort Fairfield, Mars Hill	
1.000 mi = 1.609 km; 1.000 km = 0.621 mi
