= Kennebunkport (CDP), Maine =

Kennebunkport, Maine
- Census-designated place
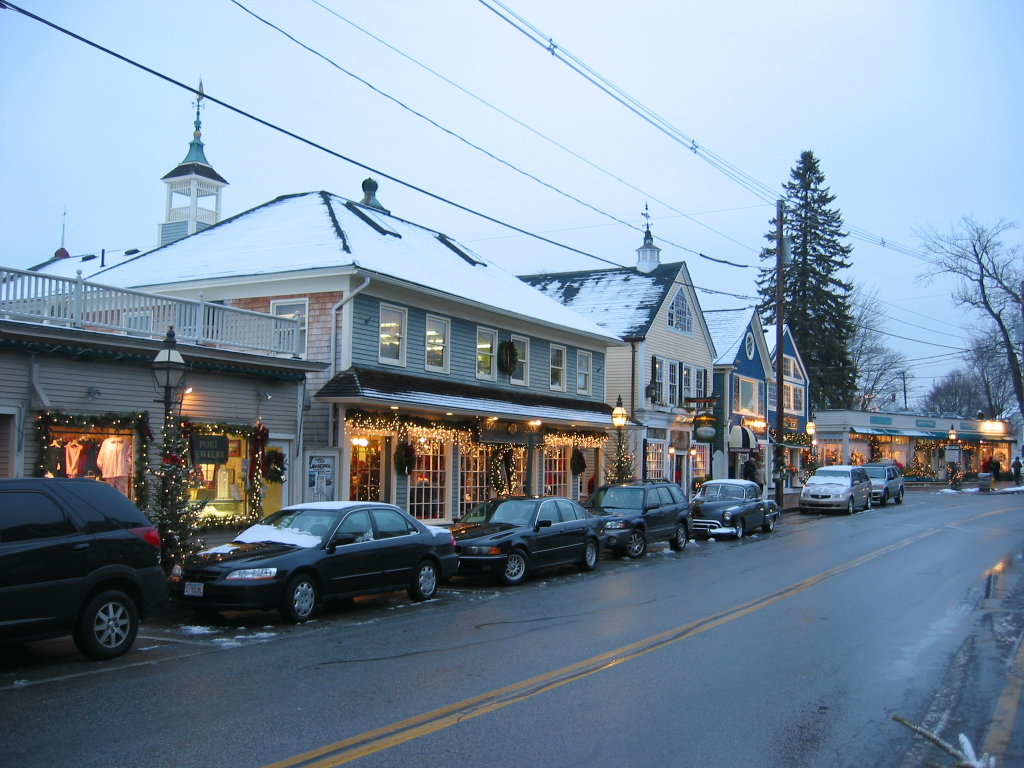
- Downtown Kennebunkport

- Location within the state of Maine
- Coordinates: 43°22′05″N 70°27′56″W
- Country: United States
- State: Maine
- County: York

Area
  - Total: 3.10 sq mi (8.03 km^{2})
  - Land: 2.98 sq mi (7.72 km^{2})
  - Water: 0.12 sq mi (0.31 km^{2})
- Elevation: 75 ft (23 m)

Population (2020)
  - Total: 1,264
  - Density: 424.1/sq mi (163.75/km^{2})
- Time zone: UTC-5 (Eastern (EST))
  - Summer (DST): UTC-4 (EDT)
- ZIP code: 04046
- Area code: 207
- FIPS code: 23-36710
- GNIS feature ID: 2377921

Kennebunkport is a census-designated place (CDP) consisting of the central village in the town of Kennebunkport in York County, Maine, United States. The population was 1,238 at the 2010 census, out of a total town population of 3,474. It is part of the Portland–South Portland–Biddeford, Maine Metropolitan Statistical Area.

== Geography ==
According to the United States Census Bureau, the CDP has a total area of 3.1 square miles (8.0 km^{2}), of which 2.9 square miles (7.6 km^{2}) is land and 0.1 square miles (0.3 km^{2}), or 4.76%, is water.

== Demographics ==
Historical population
Census	Pop.	Note	%±
2020	1,264		—
U.S. Decennial Census

As of the census of 2000, there were 1,376 people, 631 households, and 401 families residing in the CDP. The population density was 467.5 inhabitants per square mile (180.5/km^{2}). There were 945 housing units at an average density of 321.1 per square mile (124.0/km^{2}). The racial makeup of the CDP was 98.69% White, 0.36% Black or African American, 0.22% Native American, 0.15% Asian, 0.07% from other races, and 0.51% from two or more races. Hispanic or Latino of any race were 0.36% of the population.

There were 631 households, out of which 19.2% had children under the age of 18 living with them, 56.3% were married couples living together, 6.0% had a female householder with no husband present, and 36.3% were non-families. 30.3% of all households were made up of individuals, and 14.3% had someone living alone who was 65 years of age or older. The average household size was 2.18 and the average family size was 2.69.

In the CDP, the population was spread out, with 18.2% under the age of 18, 4.0% from 18 to 24, 20.6% from 25 to 44, 33.5% from 45 to 64, and 23.6% who were 65 years of age or older. The median age was 50 years. For every 100 females, there were 84.2 males. For every 100 females age 18 and over, there were 83.5 males.

The median income for a household in the CDP was $54,167, and the median income for a family was $66,477. Males had a median income of $42,500 versus $36,071 for females. The per capita income for the CDP was $45,640. None of the families and 3.7% of the population were living below the poverty line, including no under eighteens and none of those over 64.

== Education ==
The community is in Regional School Unit 21.
