= Limestone (CDP), Maine =

Limestone, Maine
- Census-designated place
- Location of Limestone, Maine
- Coordinates: 46°54′40″N 67°49′51″W
- Country: United States
- State: Maine
- County: Aroostook
- Town: Limestone

Area
  - Total: 2.65 sq mi (6.86 km^{2})
  - Land: 2.65 sq mi (6.86 km^{2})
  - Water: 0 sq mi (0.00 km^{2})
- Elevation: 614 ft (187 m)

Population (2020)
  - Total: 874
  - Density: 330.0/sq mi (127.41/km^{2})
- Time zone: UTC-5 (Eastern (EST))
  - Summer (DST): UTC-4 (EDT)
- ZIP Code: 04750
- Area code: 207
- FIPS code: 23-39265
- GNIS feature ID: 2377925

Limestone is a census-designated place (CDP) comprising the main village within the town of Limestone in Aroostook County, Maine, United States. The population was 1,075 at the 2010 census, out of a population of 2,314 for the entire town.

== Geography ==
The Limestone CDP is located slightly east of the center of the town of Limestone. U.S. Route 1A runs north-south through the center of the CDP, intersecting Maine State Routes 229 and 89.

According to the United States Census Bureau, the CDP has a total area of 2.6 square miles (6.8 km^{2}), all land.

== Demographics ==
Historical population
Census	Pop.	Note	%±
2020	874		—
U.S. Decennial Census

Languages (2000)	Percent
Spoke English at home	89.07%
Spoke French at home	8.50%
Spoke Spanish at home	2.43%

At the 2000 census, there were 1,453 people, 420 households and 272 families residing in the CDP. The population density was 557.0 inhabitants per square mile (215.1/km^{2}). There were 495 housing units at an average density of 189.8 per square mile (73.3/km^{2}). The racial makeup of the CDP was 87.96% White, 6.06% Black or African American, 0.83% Native American, 1.86% Asian, 0.89% from other races, and 2.41% from two or more races. Hispanic or Latino of any race were 4.75% of the population.

There were 420 households, of which 26.4% had children under the age of 18 living with them, 51.9% were married couples living together, 8.6% had a female householder with no husband present, and 35.2% were non-families. 31.7% of all households were made up of individuals, and 11.7% had someone living alone who was 65 years of age or older. The average household size was 2.27 and the average family size was 2.81.

Age distribution was 26.7% under the age of 18, 24.4% from 18 to 24, 17.0% from 25 to 44, 20.6% from 45 to 64, and 11.3% who were 65 years of age or older. The median age was 24 years. For every 100 females, there were 124.6 males. For every 100 females age 18 and over, there were 120.5 males.

The median household income was $33,600, and the median family income was $34,250. Males had a median income of $30,278 versus $15,948 for females. The per capita income for the CDP was $11,160. About 6.8% of families and 26.8% of the population were below the poverty line, including 15.4% of those under age 18 and none of those age 65 or over.

== Education ==
The school district for this community is Limestone Public Schools, an elementary school district.
