= Milbridge (CDP), Maine =

Milbridge, Maine
- Census-designated place
- Location within Maine Location within the United States
- Coordinates: 44°31′58″N 67°52′55″W
- Country: United States
- State: Maine
- County: Washington
- Town: Milbridge

Area
  - Total: 2.09 sq mi (5.41 km^{2})
  - Land: 1.83 sq mi (4.74 km^{2})
  - Water: 0.26 sq mi (0.67 km^{2})
- Elevation: 49 ft (15 m)

Population (2020)
  - Total: 435
  - Density: 237.6/sq mi (91.73/km^{2})
- Time zone: UTC-5 (Eastern (EST))
  - Summer (DST): UTC-4 (EDT)
- ZIP Code: 04658
- Area code: 207
- FIPS code: 23-45565
- GNIS feature ID: 2806293

Milbridge is a census-designated place (CDP) and the primary village in the town of Milbridge, Washington County, Maine, United States. It is in southwestern Washington County, near the center of the town of Milbridge, on the west side of the tidal Narraguagus River. It is bordered to the west by the town of Steuben.

U.S. Route 1 passes through the village, leading north 5 miles (8 km) to Cherryfield and west 31 miles (50 km) to Ellsworth. U.S. Route 1A departs from Route 1 in Milbridge, crossing the Narraguagus and heading northeast, rejoining Route 1 in Harrington and providing a shortcut to points farther east along the coast. Via Route 1A, it is 28 miles (45 km) to Machias.

Milbridge was first listed as a CDP prior to the 2020 census.

== Demographics ==
Historical population
Census	Pop.	Note	%±
2020	435		—
U.S. Decennial Census
