= Van Buren (CDP), Maine =

Van Buren, Maine
- Census-designated place
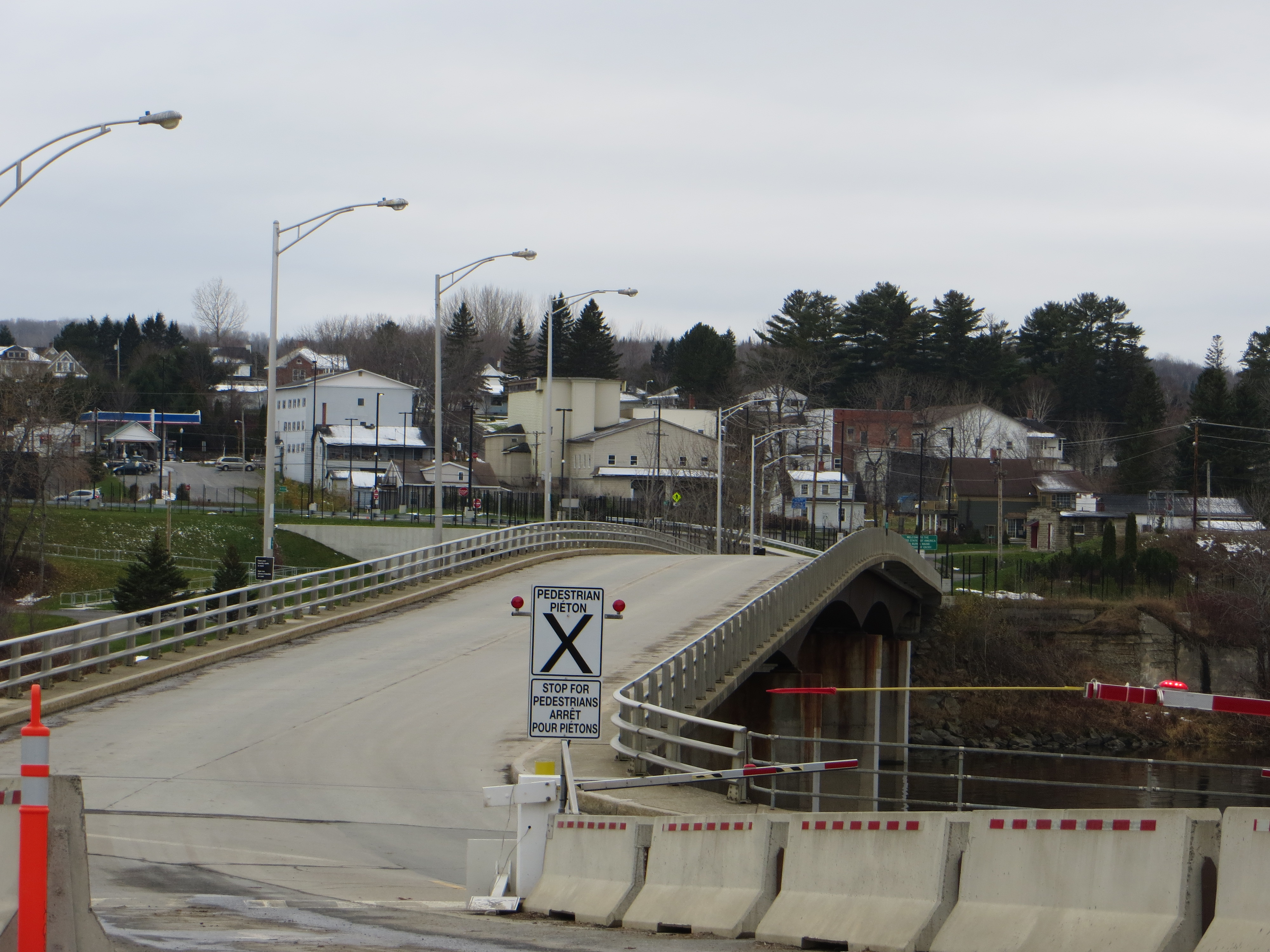
- View of Van Buren from Canada

- Location of Van Buren, Maine
- Coordinates: 47°09′57″N 67°57′04″W
- Country: United States
- State: Maine
- County: Aroostook
- Town: Van Buren

Area
  - Total: 4.65 sq mi (12.04 km^{2})
  - Land: 4.32 sq mi (11.20 km^{2})
  - Water: 0.32 sq mi (0.84 km^{2})
- Elevation: 535 ft (163 m)

Population (2020)
  - Total: 1,809
  - Density: 418.5/sq mi (161.57/km^{2})
- Time zone: UTC-5 (Eastern (EST))
  - Summer (DST): UTC-4 (EDT)
- ZIP code: 04785
- Area code: 207
- FIPS code: 23-78535
- GNIS feature ID: 2377964

Van Buren is a census-designated place (CDP) comprising the main village within the town of Van Buren in Aroostook County, Maine, United States. The population of the CDP was 1,937 at the 2010 census, out of a population of 2,171 for the entire town.

== Geography ==
The Van Buren CDP is located in the southeastern part of the town of Van Buren. The Saint John River forms the northeast border of the CDP and the town and is also the Canada–United States border. U.S. Route 1 passes through the center of the CDP, leading northwest 24 miles (39 km) to Madawaska and 23 miles (37 km) south to Caribou. U.S. Route 1A meets Route 1 near the southeast edge of the CDP and leads south along the Canada–US border 21 miles (34 km) to Limestone. A bridge across the Saint John River at Van Buren leads to Saint-Léonard, New Brunswick, in Canada.

According to the United States Census Bureau, the Van Buren CDP has a total area of 4.4 square miles (11.5 km^{2}), of which 4.2 square miles (10.8 km^{2}) is land and 0.27 square miles (0.7 km^{2}), or 5.87%, is water.

== Demographics ==
Historical population
Census	Pop.	Note	%±
2020	1,809		—
U.S. Decennial Census

Languages (2000)	Percent
Spoke French at home	78.86%
Spoke English at home	21.14%

As of the census of 2000, there were 2,369 people, 1,005 households, and 627 families residing in the CDP. The population density was 565.8 inhabitants per square mile (218.5/km^{2}). There were 1,119 housing units at an average density of 267.2 per square mile (103.2/km^{2}). The racial makeup of the CDP was 98.78% White, 0.13% Black or African American, 0.21% Native American, 0.17% Asian, 0.04% from other races, and 0.68% from two or more races. Hispanic or Latino of any race were 0.55% of the population.

There were 1,005 households, out of which 24.6% had children under the age of 18 living with them, 48.4% were married couples living together, 9.5% had a female householder with no husband present, and 37.6% were non-families. 33.2% of all households were made up of individuals, and 16.1% had someone living alone who was 65 years of age or older. The average household size was 2.16 and the average family size was 2.69.

In the CDP, the population was spread out, with 18.8% under the age of 18, 5.4% from 18 to 24, 24.3% from 25 to 44, 28.1% from 45 to 64, and 23.4% who were 65 years of age or older. The median age was 46 years. For every 100 females, there were 87.0 males. For every 100 females age 18 and over, there were 84.9 males.

The median income for a household in the CDP was $19,441, and the median income for a family was $30,870. Males had a median income of $27,917 versus $19,958 for females. The per capita income for the CDP was $13,225. About 16.1% of families and 23.2% of the population were below the poverty line, including 31.0% of those under age 18 and 12.7% of those age 65 or over.

== Education ==
The school district for this community is School Administrative District 24.
