= Jonesboro, Maine =

Town in Maine, United States

- Town
- Location within Maine Location within the United States
- Coordinates: 44°38′48″N 67°35′43″W
- Country: United States
- State: Maine
- County: Washington

Area
  - Total: 38.36 sq mi (99.35 km^{2})
  - Land: 36.58 sq mi (94.74 km^{2})
  - Water: 1.78 sq mi (4.61 km^{2})
- Elevation: 92 ft (28 m)

Population (2020)
  - Total: 587
  - Density: 16/sq mi (6.2/km^{2})
- Time zone: UTC-5 (Eastern (EST))
  - Summer (DST): UTC-4 (EDT)
- ZIP Codes: 04648 (Jonesboro); 04654 (Machias); 04623 (Columbia Falls)
- Area code: 207
- FIPS code: 23-35905
- GNIS feature ID: 582536

Jonesboro (/ˈdʒoʊnzbʌrə/) is a town in Washington County, Maine, United States. The town was named for John Coffin Jones, a landholder. The population was 587 at the 2020 census.

== Geography ==
According to the United States Census Bureau, the town has a total area of 38.36 square miles (99.35 km^{2}), of which 36.58 square miles (94.74 km^{2}) is land and 1.78 square miles (4.61 km^{2}) is water.

=== Climate ===
This climatic region is typified by large seasonal temperature differences, with warm to hot (and often humid) summers and cold (sometimes severely cold) winters. According to the Köppen Climate Classification system, Jonesboro has a humid continental climate, abbreviated "Dfb" on climate maps.

== Demographics ==
Historical population
Census	Pop.	Note	%±
1810	553		—
1820	675		22.1%
1830	810		20.0%
1840	392		−51.6%
1850	466		18.9%
1860	518		11.2%
1870	522		0.8%
1880	555		6.3%
1890	624		12.4%
1900	606		−2.9%
1910	519		−14.4%
1920	461		−11.2%
1930	468		1.5%
1940	479		2.4%
1950	459		−4.2%
1960	428		−6.8%
1970	448		4.7%
1980	553		23.4%
1990	585		5.8%
2000	594		1.5%
2010	583		−1.9%
2020	587		0.7%
U.S. Decennial Census

=== 2010 census ===
As of the census of 2010, there were 583 people, 256 households, and 151 families living in the town. The population density was 15.9 inhabitants per square mile (6.1/km^{2}). There were 332 housing units at an average density of 9.1 per square mile (3.5/km^{2}). The racial makeup of the town was 96.7% White, 0.2% African American, 0.5% Native American, 0.3% Asian, 0.5% from other races, and 1.7% from two or more races. Hispanic or Latino of any race were 0.9% of the population.

There were 256 households, of which 25.8% had children under the age of 18 living with them, 47.3% were married couples living together, 8.6% had a female householder with no husband present, 3.1% had a male householder with no wife present, and 41.0% were non-families. 32.4% of all households were made up of individuals, and 14.8% had someone living alone who was 65 years of age or older. The average household size was 2.28 and the average family size was 2.89.

The median age in the town was 45.2 years. 21.6% of residents were under the age of 18; 5.5% were between the ages of 18 and 24; 22.7% were from 25 to 44; 34.1% were from 45 to 64; and 16.1% were 65 years of age or older. The gender makeup of the town was 50.6% male and 49.4% female.

=== 2000 census ===
As of the census of 2000, there were 594 people, 257 households, and 172 families living in the town. The population density was 16.2 inhabitants per square mile (6.3/km^{2}). There were 325 housing units at an average density of 8.9 per square mile (3.4/km^{2}). The racial makeup of the town was 99.33% White, 0.17% African American, and 0.51% from two or more races. Hispanic or Latino of any race were 0.51% of the population.

There were 257 households, out of which 29.2% had children under the age of 18 living with them, 57.6% were married couples living together, 5.8% had a female householder with no husband present, and 32.7% were non-families. 29.2% of all households were made up of individuals, and 14.8% had someone living alone who was 65 years of age or older. The average household size was 2.31 and the average family size was 2.82.

In the town, the population was spread out, with 24.6% under the age of 18, 5.1% from 18 to 24, 27.8% from 25 to 44, 25.3% from 45 to 64, and 17.3% who were 65 years of age or older. The median age was 41 years. For every 100 females, there were 99.3 males. For every 100 females age 18 and over, there were 95.6 males.

The median income for a household in the town was $27,639, and the median income for a family was $36,458. Males had a median income of $31,389 versus $20,956 for females. The per capita income for the town was $14,418. About 9.6% of families and 16.1% of the population were below the poverty line, including 17.6% of those under age 18 and 12.0% of those age 65 or over.

== Education ==
It is in the Jonesboro School District. Jonesboro Elementary School is in the municipality, and is a part of the Alternative Organizational System 96.

Area high schools include Washington Academy in East Machias, and Machias Memorial High School in Machias.

== Notable people ==
- Eugene V. Allen, Methodist minister, state legislator, Ku Klux Klan spokesperson
- Nathaniel Farnsworth, politician
- Tom Selleck, actor, film producer
