= Prospect Harbor, Maine =

- Village
- Location within Maine Location within the United States
- Coordinates: 44°24′32″N 68°01′34″W
- Country: United States
- State: Maine
- County: Hancock
- Town: Gouldsboro
- Elevation: 20 ft (6.1 m)
- Time zone: UTC-5 (Eastern (EST))
  - Summer (DST): UTC-4 (EDT)
- ZIP Code: 04669
- Area code: 207
- GNIS feature ID: 573836

Prospect Harbor is an unincorporated community in the town of Gouldsboro, Hancock County, Maine, United States. Its ZIP code is 04669.

== Education ==
It is in the Regional School Unit 24. The zoned elementary school is Peninsula School in Prospect Park. The district's secondary schools, Sumner Middle School and Sumner Memorial High School, are a part of the Sumner Learning Campus in Sullivan.
