= Washburn (CDP), Maine =

Washburn, Maine
- Census-designated place
- Location of Washburn, Maine
- Coordinates: 46°46′46″N 68°08′08″W
- Country: United States
- State: Maine
- County: Aroostook
- Town: Washburn

Area
  - Total: 4.53 sq mi (11.73 km^{2})
  - Land: 4.47 sq mi (11.57 km^{2})
  - Water: 0.062 sq mi (0.16 km^{2})
- Elevation: 577 ft (176 m)

Population (2020)
  - Total: 937
  - Density: 209.7/sq mi (80.97/km^{2})
- Time zone: UTC-5 (Eastern (EST))
  - Summer (DST): UTC-4 (EDT)
- ZIP code: 04786
- Area code: 207
- FIPS code: 23-80250
- GNIS feature ID: 2583567

Washburn is a census-designated place (CDP) comprising the main village within the town of Washburn in Aroostook County, Maine, United States. The population of the CDP was 997 at the 2010 census, out of a population of 1,687 for the entire town.

== Geography ==
The Washburn CDP is located in the western part of the town of Washburn, at the junction of Maine State Routes 164 and 228. It is 10 miles (16 km) northeast to Caribou along Route 164.

According to the United States Census Bureau, the CDP has a total area of 4.5 square miles (11.7 km^{2}), of which 4.5 square miles (11.6 km^{2}) is land and 0.077 square miles (0.2 km^{2}), or 1.33%, is water.

== Demographics ==
Historical population
Census	Pop.	Note	%±
2020	937		—
U.S. Decennial Census
