= Lamoine, Maine =

Town in Maine, United States

- Town
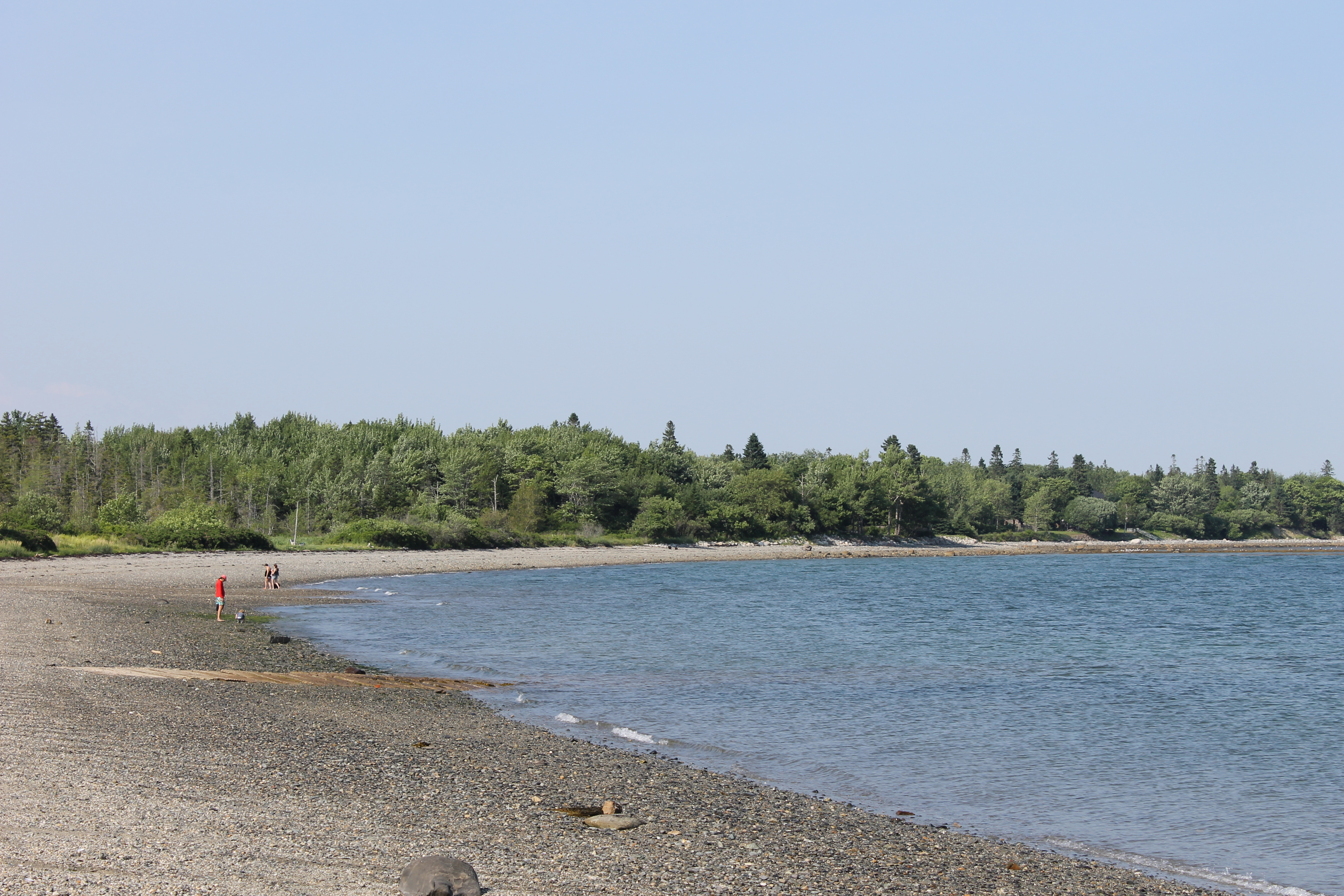
- Lamoine Beach Park

- Logo

- Location within Maine Location within the United States
- Coordinates: 44°29′12″N 68°18′52″W
- Country: United States
- State: Maine
- County: Hancock
- Villages: East Lamoine; Lamoine Beach; Lamoine Corner; Marlboro; North Lamoine

Area
  - Total: 25.07 sq mi (64.93 km^{2})
  - Land: 17.82 sq mi (46.15 km^{2})
  - Water: 7.25 sq mi (18.78 km^{2})
- Elevation: 167 ft (51 m)

Population (2020)
  - Total: 1,720
  - Density: 97/sq mi (37.3/km^{2})
- Time zone: UTC-5 (Eastern (EST))
  - Summer (DST): UTC-4 (EDT)
- ZIP code: 04605
- Area code: 207
- FIPS code: 23-38180
- GNIS feature ID: 582549
- Website: www.lamoine-me.gov

Lamoine is a town in Hancock County, Maine, United States. The town was named after an early resident, Andre LeMoyne. The spelling shifted slightly over the years. "Le moine" is French for "the monk." The population was 1,720 at the 2020 census. The town is home to Lamoine State Park.

== Geography ==
According to the United States Census Bureau, the town has a total area of 25.07 square miles (64.93 km^{2}), of which 17.82 square miles (46.15 km^{2}) is land and 7.25 square miles (18.78 km^{2}) is water.

== Government ==
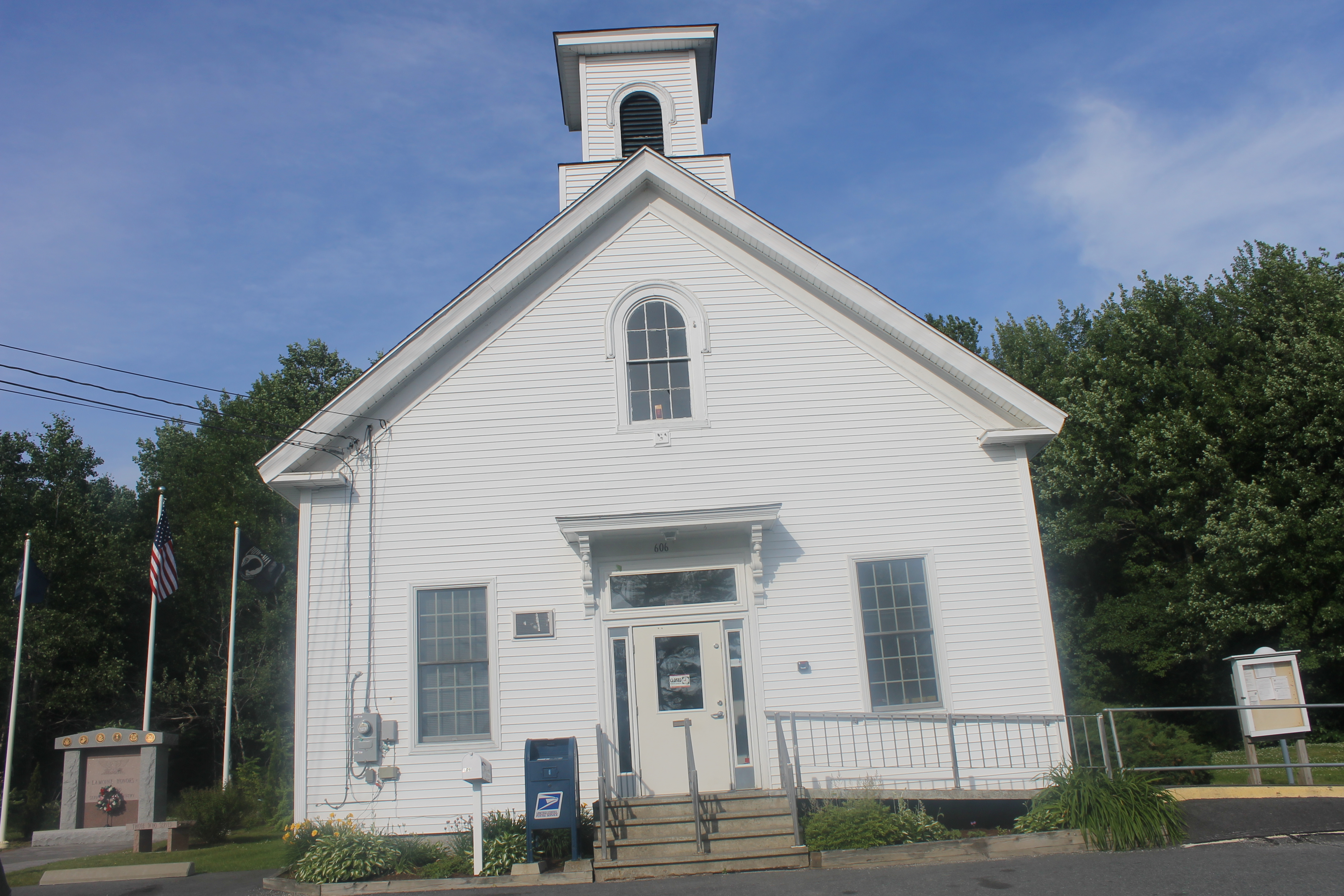
Located in a former school building is the Lamoine Town Hall, with Veterans Memorial to the left.

The Town of Lamoine elects a five-member Board of Selectmen who serve as the municipal officers of the municipality. They employ a full-time administrative assistant, a full-time Town Clerk, Tax Collector, part-time Code Enforcement Officer and Transfer Station Manager. The Board of Assessors is an elected three member body. The Lamoine School Department is a five-member elected board which employs a part-time superintendent of schools and is responsible for operation of the Lamoine Consolidated School.

Most municipal meetings are held at the Lamoine Town Hall, 606 Douglas Highway, Lamoine.

== Demographics ==
Historical population
Census	Pop.	Note	%±
1870	612		—
1880	749		22.4%
1890	726		−3.1%
1900	594		−18.2%
1910	482		−18.9%
1920	327		−32.2%
1930	354		8.3%
1940	454		28.2%
1950	443		−2.4%
1960	484		9.3%
1970	615		27.1%
1980	953		55.0%
1990	1,311		37.6%
2000	1,495		14.0%
2010	1,602		7.2%
2020	1,720		7.4%
U.S. Decennial Census

=== 2010 census ===
As of the census of 2010, there were 1,602 people, 712 households, and 460 families living in the town. The population density was 89.9 inhabitants per square mile (34.7/km^{2}). There were 994 housing units at an average density of 55.8 per square mile (21.5/km^{2}). The racial makeup of the town was 98.0% White, 0.5% African American, 0.1% Native American, 0.5% Asian, 0.1% from other races, and 0.8% from two or more races. Hispanic or Latino of any race were 0.7% of the population.

There were 712 households, of which 24.4% had children under the age of 18 living with them, 54.1% were married couples living together, 6.3% had a female householder with no husband present, 4.2% had a male householder with no wife present, and 35.4% were non-families. 25.0% of all households were made up of individuals, and 8.1% had someone living alone who was 65 years of age or older. The average household size was 2.25 and the average family size was 2.68.

The median age in the town was 48 years. 17.9% of residents were under the age of 18; 4.8% were between the ages of 18 and 24; 22.2% were from 25 to 44; 37.9% were from 45 to 64; and 17.4% were 65 years of age or older. The gender makeup of the town was 48.8% male and 51.2% female.

=== 2000 census ===
As of the census of 2000, there were 1,495 people, 605 households, and 434 families living in the town. The population density was 83.6 inhabitants per square mile (32.3/km^{2}). There were 803 housing units at an average density of 44.9 per square mile (17.3/km^{2}). The racial makeup of the town was 97.53% White, 0.27% African American, 0.54% Native American, 0.67% Asian, 0.07% from other races, and 0.94% from two or more races. Hispanic or Latino of any race were 0.60% of the population.

There were 605 households, out of which 31.2% had children under the age of 18 living with them, 61.2% were married couples living together, 6.8% had a female householder with no husband present, and 28.1% were non-families. 21.2% of all households were made up of individuals, and 8.4% had someone living alone who was 65 years of age or older. The average household size was 2.47 and the average family size was 2.86.

In the town, the population was spread out, with 23.7% under the age of 18, 5.0% from 18 to 24, 28.9% from 25 to 44, 28.0% from 45 to 64, and 14.4% who were 65 years of age or older. The median age was 41 years. For every 100 females, there were 95.7 males. For every 100 females age 18 and over, there were 93.4 males.

The median income for a household in the town was $39,783, and the median income for a family was $45,050. Males had a median income of $28,365 versus $22,300 for females. The per capita income for the town was $19,712. About 5.3% of families and 8.8% of the population were below the poverty line, including 13.8% of those under age 18 and 5.4% of those age 65 or over.

== Gallery ==
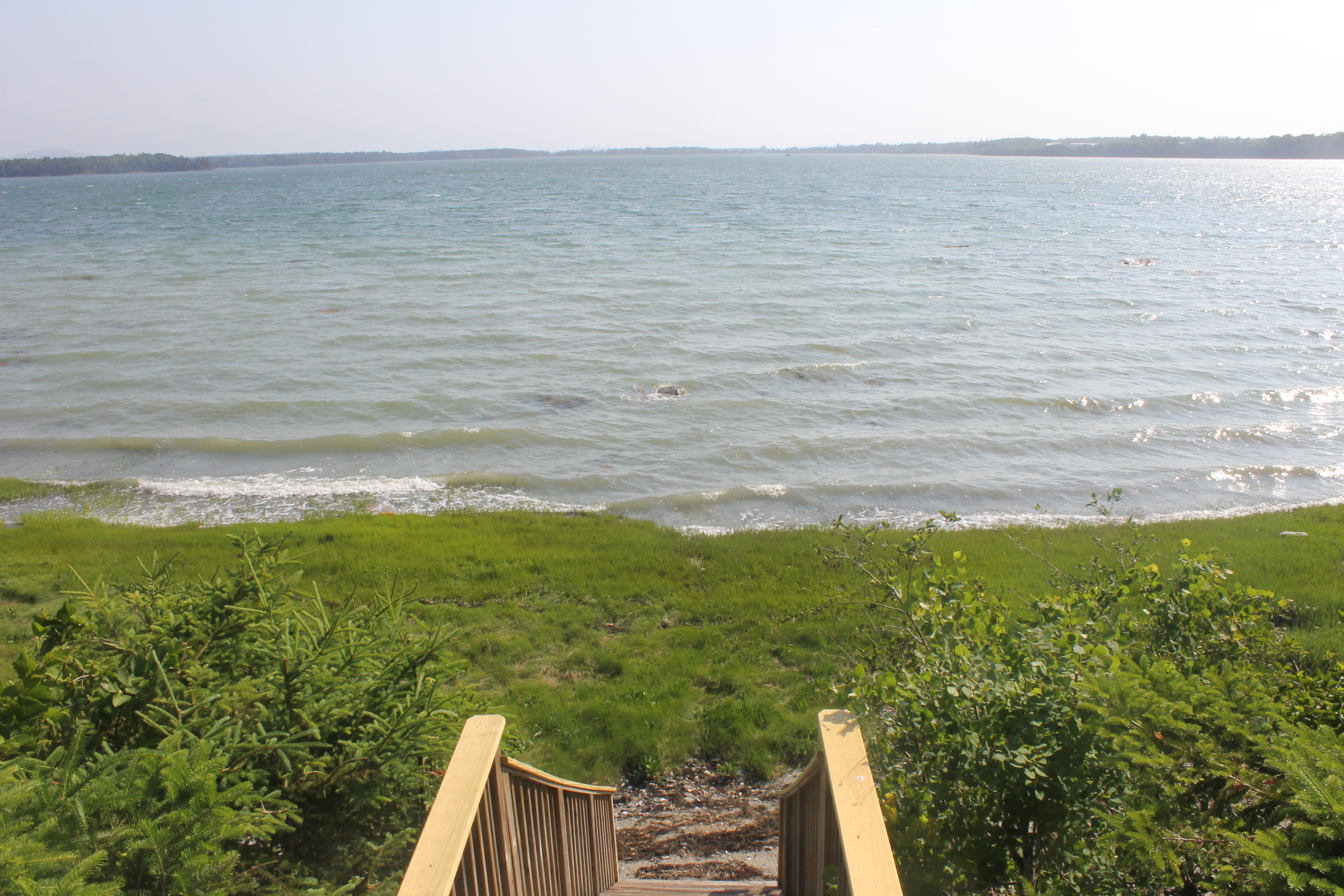
Frenchman Bay at high tide

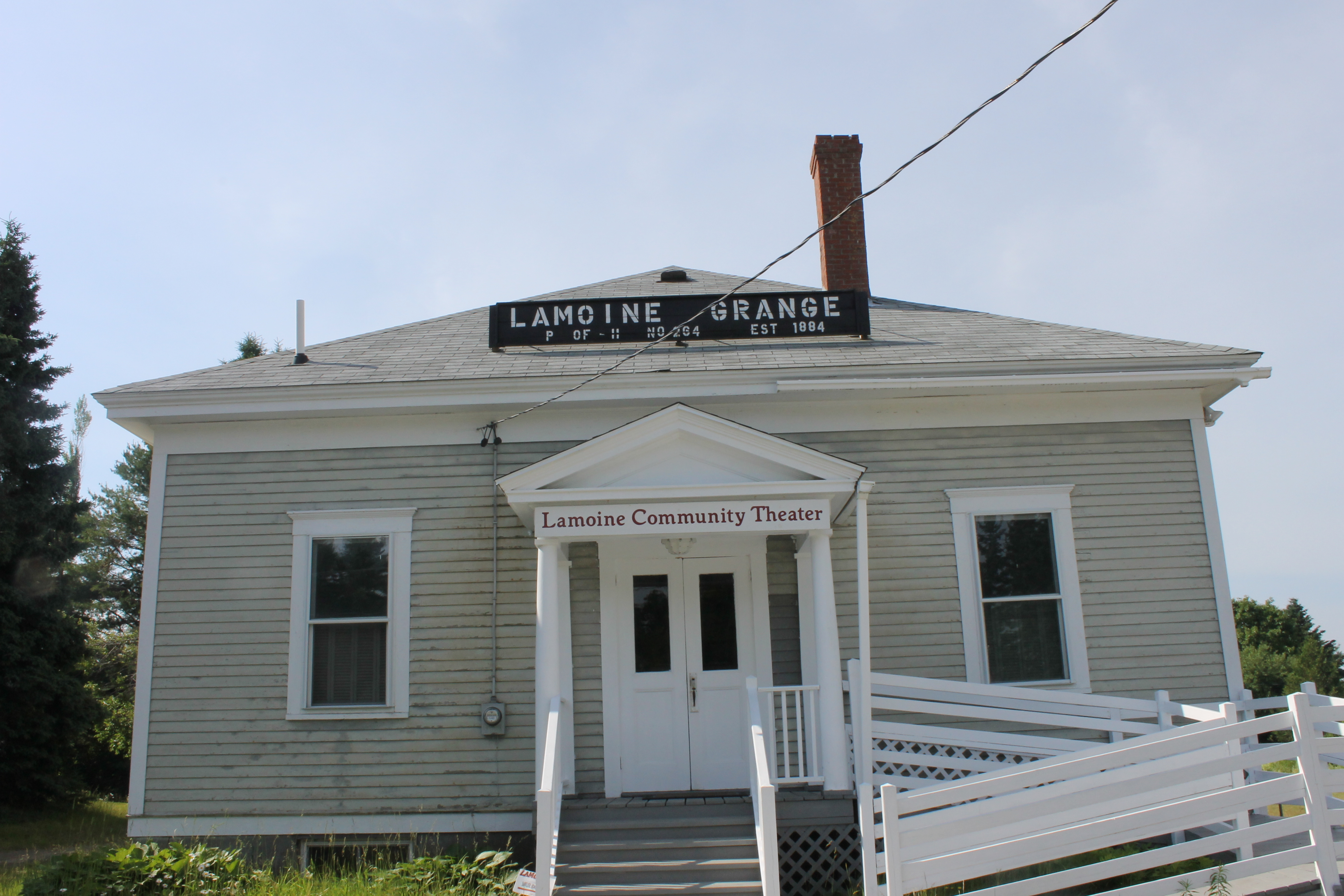
The Lamoine Grange and Community Theater

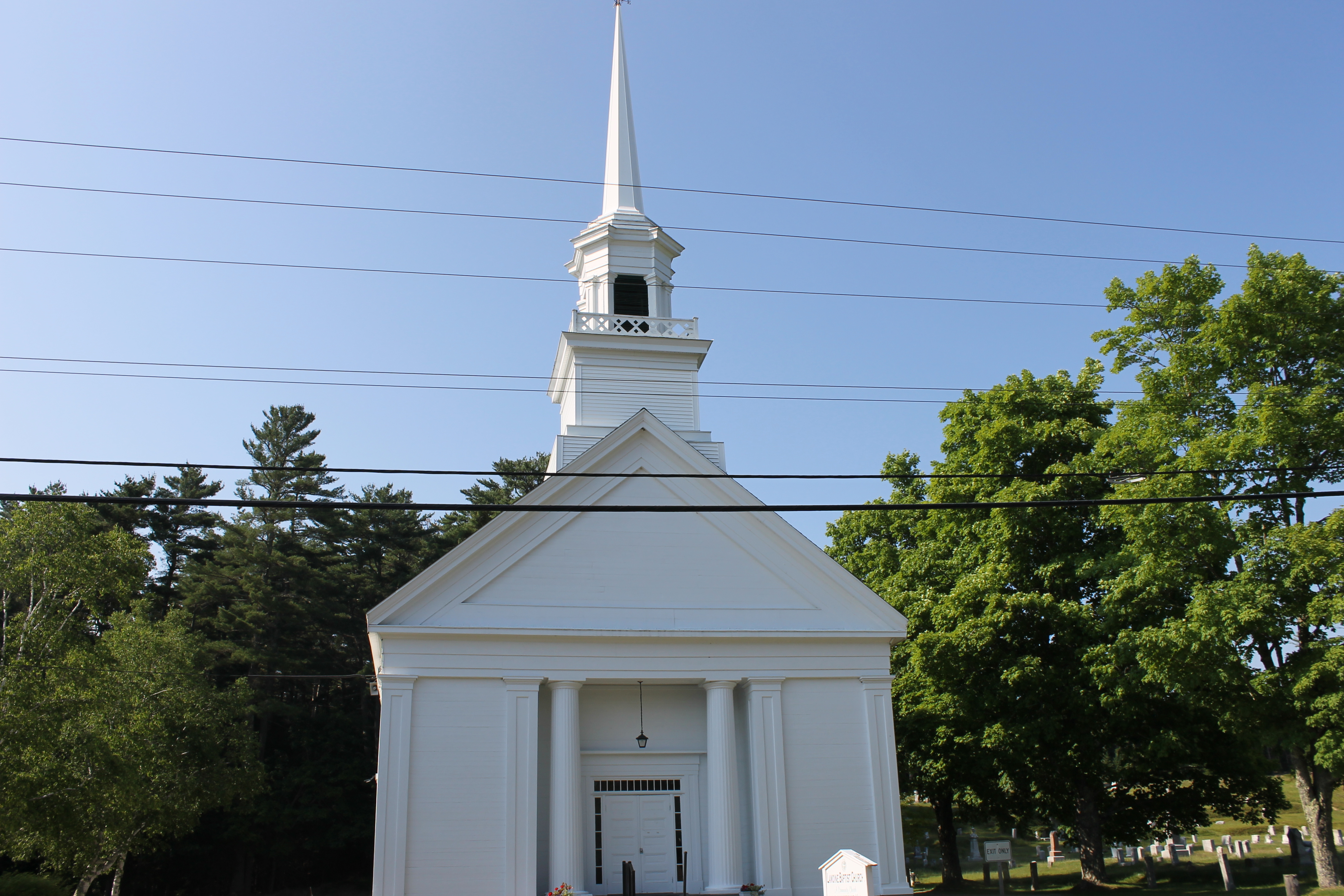
Lamoine Baptist Church

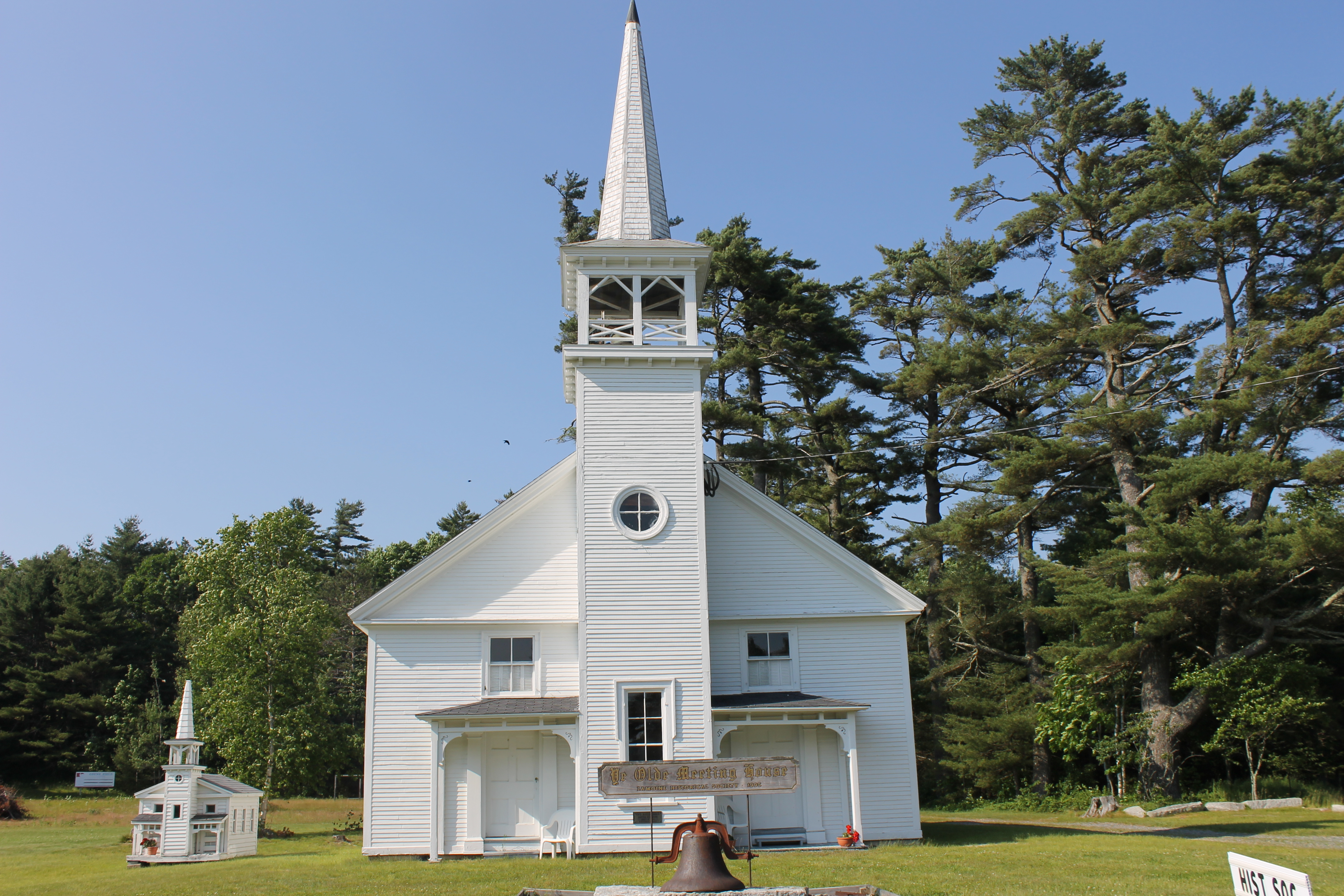
Ye Olde Meeting House in Lamoine is the former First Baptist Church (erected 1832)
