= Machias (CDP), Maine =

Machias, Maine
- Census-designated place
- Location within Maine Location within the United States
- Coordinates: 44°42′29″N 67°28′29″W
- Country: United States
- State: Maine
- County: Washington

Area
  - Total: 2.85 sq mi (7.38 km^{2})
  - Land: 2.70 sq mi (6.99 km^{2})
  - Water: 0.15 sq mi (0.38 km^{2})
- Elevation: 39 ft (12 m)

Population (2020)
  - Total: 1,457
  - Density: 539.7/sq mi (208.38/km^{2})
- Time zone: UTC-5 (Eastern (EST))
  - Summer (DST): UTC-4 (EDT)
- ZIP Code: 04654
- Area code: 207
- FIPS code: 23-41925
- GNIS feature ID: 2377931

Machias is a census-designated place (CDP) corresponding to the central village area within the town of Machias in Washington County, Maine, United States. The population of the CDP was 1,274 at the 2010 census.

== Geography ==
According to the United States Census Bureau, the CDP has a total area of 2.6 square miles (6.7 km^{2}), of which 2.5 square miles (6.5 km^{2}) is land and 0.1 square miles (0.2 km^{2}), or 3.47%, is water.

== Demographics ==
Historical population
Census	Pop.	Note	%±
2020	1,457		—
U.S. Decennial Census

As of the census of 2000, there were 1,376 people, 613 households, and 291 families residing in the CDP. The population density was 550.6 inhabitants per square mile (212.6/km^{2}). There were 735 housing units at an average density of 294.1 per square mile (113.6/km^{2}). The racial makeup of the CDP was 96.15% White, 1.31% Native American, 1.82% Asian, 0.07% from other races, and 0.65% from two or more races. Hispanic or Latino of any race were 0.44% of the population.

There were 613 households, out of which 23.5% had children under the age of 18 living with them, 32.1% were married couples living together, 11.7% had a female householder with no husband present, and 52.5% were non-families. 44.2% of all households were made up of individuals, and 19.7% had someone living alone who was 65 years of age or older. The average household size was 2.00 and the average family size was 2.76.

In the CDP, the population was spread out, with 19.3% under the age of 18, 13.3% from 18 to 24, 21.7% from 25 to 44, 21.9% from 45 to 64, and 23.8% who were 65 years of age or older. The median age was 41 years. For every 100 females, there were 80.6 males. For every 100 females age 18 and over, there were 75.6 males.

The median income for a household in the CDP was $21,250, and the median income for a family was $40,000. Males had a median income of $30,417 versus $21,705 for females. The per capita income for the CDP was $14,780. About 15.4% of families and 23.8% of the population were below the poverty line, including 21.1% of those under age 18 and 23.8% of those age 65 or over.

== Education ==
It is in the Machias Public Schools school district, which is a component of Machias Bay Area School System Alternative Organizational System 96. Machias has Rose M. Gaffney School and Machias Memorial High School.
