= Fort Fairfield (CDP), Maine =

Fort Fairfield, Maine
- Census-designated place
- Location of Fort Fairfield, Maine
- Coordinates: 46°45′57″N 67°49′59″W
- Country: United States
- State: Maine
- County: Aroostook
- Town: Fort Fairfield

Area
  - Total: 3.05 sq mi (7.89 km^{2})
  - Land: 2.93 sq mi (7.58 km^{2})
  - Water: 0.12 sq mi (0.30 km^{2})
- Elevation: 384 ft (117 m)

Population (2020)
  - Total: 1,666
  - Density: 568.9/sq mi (219.65/km^{2})
- Time zone: UTC-5 (Eastern (EST))
  - Summer (DST): UTC-4 (EDT)
- ZIP code: 04742
- Area code: 207
- FIPS code: 23-25580
- GNIS feature ID: 2377910

Fort Fairfield is a census-designated place (CDP) comprising the main village within the town of Fort Fairfield in Aroostook County, Maine, United States. The population of the CDP was 1,825 at the 2010 census, out of a population of 3,496 for the entire town.

Fort Fairfield is named for John Fairfield, 13th and 16th governor of Maine.

== Geography ==
The Fort Fairfield CDP is located along the Aroostook River near the center of the town of Fort Fairfield. U.S. Route 1A, Maine State Route 161 and Maine State Route 167 intersect at the center of the CDP.

According to the United States Census Bureau, the CDP has a total area of 3.1 square miles (7.9 km^{2}), of which 2.9 square miles (7.6 km^{2}) is land and 0.12 square miles (0.3 km^{2}), or 3.82%, is water.

== Demographics ==
Historical population
Census	Pop.	Note	%±
2020	1,666		—
U.S. Decennial Census

Languages (2000)	Percent
Spoke English at home	91.69%
Spoke French at home	6.53%
Spoke Spanish at home	1.78%

As of the census of 2000, there were 1,600 people, 758 households, and 432 families residing in the CDP. The population density was 718.9 inhabitants per square mile (277.6/km^{2}). There were 813 housing units at an average density of 365.3 per square mile (141.0/km^{2}). The racial makeup of the CDP was 98.56% White, 0.19% Black or African American, 0.31% Native American, 0.06% Asian, 0.06% from other races, and 0.81% from two or more races. Hispanic or Latino of any race were 0.50% of the population.

There were 758 households, out of which 22.3% had children under the age of 18 living with them, 44.5% were married couples living together, 9.6% had a female householder with no husband present, and 43.0% were non-families. 38.8% of all households were made up of individuals, and 21.9% had someone living alone who was 65 years of age or older. The average household size was 2.11 and the average family size was 2.79.

In the CDP, the population was spread out, with 20.4% under the age of 18, 6.6% from 18 to 24, 23.8% from 25 to 44, 26.2% from 45 to 64, and 23.1% who were 65 years of age or older. The median age was 44 years. For every 100 females, there were 79.2 males. For every 100 females age 18 and over, there were 76.7 males.

The median income for a household in the CDP was $23,942, and the median income for a family was $38,103. Males had a median income of $30,575 versus $25,398 for females. The per capita income for the CDP was $13,903. About 8.3% of families and 17.4% of the population were below the poverty line, including 22.6% of those under age 18 and 22.5% of those age 65 or over.

== Education ==
The school district for this community is School Administrative District 20.
