= Gouldsboro, Maine =

Town in Maine, United States

- Town
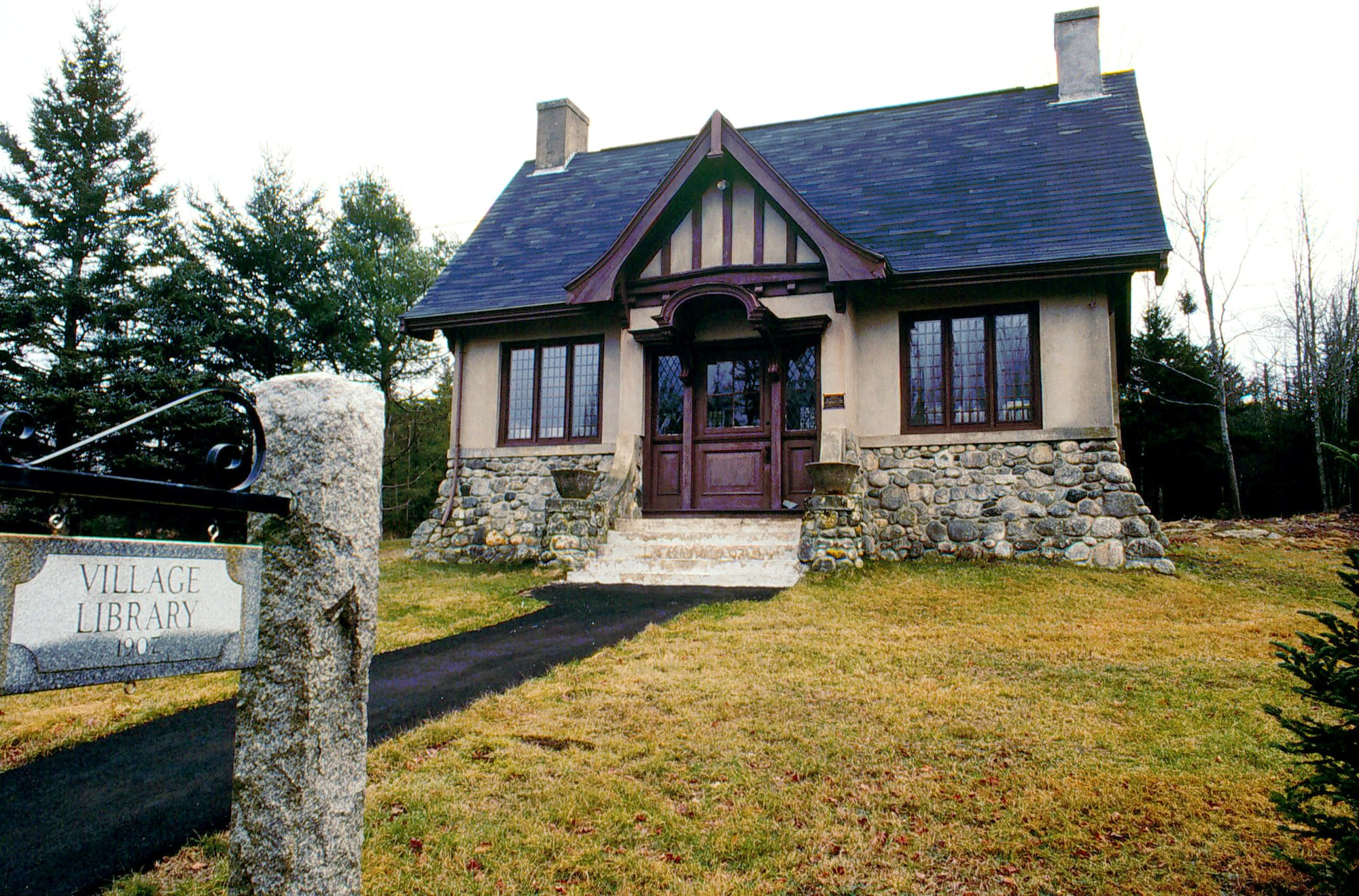
- West Gouldsboro Village Library

- Location within Maine Location within the United States
- Coordinates: 44°25′20″N 68°02′18″W
- Country: United States
- State: Maine
- County: Hancock
- First settled by natives: 9th millennium BC-8th millennium BC
- Foundation: 1763
- Incorporated as a town: February 16, 1789
- Villages: Gouldsboro; Ashville (part); Birch Harbor; Corea; Prospect Harbor; South Gouldsboro; West Gouldsboro

Area
  - Total: 98.99 sq mi (256.38 km^{2})
  - Land: 46.17 sq mi (119.58 km^{2})
  - Water: 52.82 sq mi (136.80 km^{2})
- Elevation: 108 ft (33 m)

Population (2020)
  - Total: 1,703
  - Density: 37/sq mi (14.2/km^{2})
- Time zone: UTC−5 (Eastern (EST))
  - Summer (DST): UTC−4 (EDT)
- ZIP Codes: 04607 (Gouldsboro); 04613 (Birch Harbor); 04624 (Corea); 04669 (Prospect Harbor)
- Area code: 207
- FIPS code: 23-28450
- GNIS feature ID: 582494
- Website: www.gouldsborotown.com

Gouldsboro is a town and municipality in Hancock County, Maine, United States on the Schoodic Peninsula. The town was named for Robert Gould, a landholder in the town. The town has many historically separate fishing villages, summer colonies and communities, including Birch Harbor, Prospect Harbor, South Gouldsboro, West Gouldsboro, Summer Harbor, Wonsqueak Harbor, Bunker's Harbor, Chicken Mill, Jones' Pond, Westbay, and Corea. The population was 1,703 at the 2020 census.

== History ==
=== Prehistory ===
Indigenous people known as Paleoindians, began living in the area where the town stands nowadays after the ice age, around 10,000-11,000 years ago.

Between the 2nd and 1st millennium BC the Susquehanna started to migrate and settle the area. They came from the Susquehanna River Valley and as far south as the Savannah River Valley.

Algonquin speakers started to settle the area around 1700 BCE. Their use of different tools from the Susquehanna and earlier settlers allowed the Maine Historic Preservation Commission to distinguish them. The Algonquin speakers, however, were not the only settlers, and many other tribes over time had migrated in the region, collectively known with the term "Wabanaki", or “people of the dawn land”, which would then go on to form the Wabanaki Confederacy in the 1600s.

=== Early Modern Period ===
After a period of French colonization of the area, and Wabanaki control, English settlements began to be built up after the French & Indian wars in 1763. One of these towns, which would be the predecessor of Gouldsboro, was "Township 3". The township was established by 1763.

=== Late Modern Period ===
The oldest part of the town is West Gouldsboro. The first administrator of the area were Colonel Nathan Jones, Francis Shaw and Robert Gould, who in 1764 were given authority over it by the General Court of the Commonwealth of Massachusetts.

After the American Revolutionary War, Massachusetts needed more money, and what is nowadays Maine was known for its abundance of local natural resources. To encourage settlement in the surrounding areas, back in 1786, a lottery initiative was sponsored in what the lottery labeled the Kennebec tract (a significant portion of present-day Somerset County) and the Penobscot tract (today's Hancock and Washington Counties).

The first recorded settler in the nowaday town (following the lottery) was Thomas Frazer, an African-American. The lottery however, overall, was not as successful as desired, and thus, the government unsuccessfully attempted to sell the entire town to its affluent citizens. They expected a flow of buyers from France due to the outbreak of the French Revolution, but they never came.

A few years later, on February 16, 1789, Gouldsboro would become incorporated.

=== Early Contemporary Period ===
Around 1793, a Philadelphian called William Bingham revived the development of the town and the surrounding areas included in the once-was lottery by negotiating the purchase of rights to the majority of the property. He then tried to recruit European customers. To protect his investment, he engaged the renowned General David Cobb of Massachusetts in 1795 to move and act as his on-site agent.

Initially the two men thought that the town could focus its economic investments in agriculture, in a plan to attract numerous European settlers in search of new land to farm, however, by 1799, an Englishman named John Black (Who was at the time General Cobb's clerk), saw other potential investments outside of agriculture, and in fact, proposed to focus on the production of lumber.

=== Late Contemporary Period ===
Gouldsboro's "second townhouse" was constructed in 1884, and functioned as some sort of meeting and electoral building up until 1983.

== Geography ==
According to the United States Census Bureau, the town has a total area of 98.99 square miles (256.38 km^{2}), of which 46.17 square miles (119.58 km^{2}) is land and 52.82 square miles (136.80 km^{2}) is water.

=== Corea ===
Corea is one of the many villages that comprise the town of Gouldsboro. In the early 1800s, Corea was referred to as Indian Harbor, as it was occupied by the Native American Passamaquoddy. The name of the town changed from Indian Harbor to Corea in the year 1896 with the construction of the village's first post office. The primary industry of Corea is lobster fishing.

== Demographics ==
Historical population
Census	Pop.	Note	%±
1790	267		—
1800	379		41.9%
1810	471		24.3%
1820	560		18.9%
1830	880		57.1%
1840	1,198		36.1%
1850	1,400		16.9%
1860	1,717		22.6%
1870	1,709		−0.5%
1880	1,825		6.8%
1890	1,709		−6.4%
1900	1,259		−26.3%
1910	1,349		7.1%
1920	1,282		−5.0%
1930	1,115		−13.0%
1940	1,068		−4.2%
1950	1,168		9.4%
1960	1,100		−5.8%
1970	1,310		19.1%
1980	1,574		20.2%
1990	1,986		26.2%
2000	1,941		−2.3%
2010	1,737		−10.5%
2020	1,703		−2.0%
U.S. Decennial Census

=== 2010 census ===
As of the census of 2010, there were 1,737 people, 773 households, and 528 families living in the town. The population density was 37.6 inhabitants per square mile (14.5/km^{2}). There were 1,442 housing units at an average density of 31.2 per square mile (12.0/km^{2}). The racial makeup of the town was 97.8% White, 0.2% African American, 0.3% Native American, 0.2% Asian, 0.1% Pacific Islander, 0.8% from other races, and 0.6% from two or more races. Hispanic or Latino of any race were 2.4% of the population.

There were 773 households, of which 21.6% had children under the age of 18 living with them, 56.0% were married couples living together, 7.8% had a female householder with no husband present, 4.5% had a male householder with no wife present, and 31.7% were non-families. Of all households, 26.3% were made up of individuals, and 12.7% had someone living alone who was 65 years of age or older. The average household size was 2.25 and the average family size was 2.66.

The median age in the town was 50.3 years. 17.2% of residents were under the age of 18; 6.1% were between the ages of 18 and 24; 18.4% were from 25 to 44; 35.1% were from 45 to 64; and 23.1% were 65 years of age or older. The gender makeup of the town was 50.3% male and 49.7% female.

=== 2000 census ===
As of the census of 2000, there were 1,941 people, 801 households, and 539 families living in the town. The population density was 42.1 inhabitants per square mile (16.3/km^{2}). There were 1,328 housing units at an average density of 28.8 per square mile (11.1/km^{2}). The racial makeup of the town was 96.39% White, 0.67% African American, 0.82% Native American, 0.21% Asian, 0.26% Pacific Islander, 0.52% from other races, and 1.13% from two or more races. Hispanic or Latino of any race were 1.85% of the population.

There were 801 households, out of which 25.0% had children under the age of 18 living with them, 58.8% were married couples living together, 5.5% had a female householder with no husband present, and 32.7% were non-families. Of all households, 27.5% were made up of individuals, and 13.4% had someone living alone who was 65 years of age or older. The average household size was 2.31 and the average family size was 2.78.

In the town, the population was spread out, with 19.8% under the age of 18, 7.5% from 18 to 24, 26.7% from 25 to 44, 28.6% from 45 to 64, and 17.3% who were 65 years of age or older. The median age was 42 years. For every 100 females, there were 106.7 males. For every 100 females age 18 and over, there were 100.0 males.

The median income for a household in the town was $36,542, and the median income for a family was $43,864. Males had a median income of $25,076 versus $19,563 for females. The per capita income for the town was $18,203. About 7.0% of families and 10.4% of the population were below the poverty line, including 14.9% of those under age 18 and 8.5% of those age 65 or over.

== Education ==
The school district is Regional School Unit 24. The zoned elementary school is Peninsula School in Prospect Park. The district's secondary schools, Sumner Middle School and Sumner Memorial High School, are a part of the Sumner Learning Campus in Sullivan.

== Notable people ==
- Amy Clampitt, poet, author
- General David Cobb, congressman and lieutenant governor for Massachusetts
- Luere B. Deasy, Maine Senate President and State Supreme Court Justice
- Marsden Hartley, painter and poet
- Louis A. Meyer, author, artist
- Louise Dickinson Rich, writer
