= Square Lake =

Square Lake may refer to:

- Square Lake (Nova Scotia), a lake in Nova Scotia, Canada
- Square Lake (Tehama County, California), a lake in California
- Square Lake (Maine), in the Fish River chain of lakes
- Square Lake, Maine, an unorganized territory in Maine
- Square Lake (Washington County, Minnesota)
