= Maine State Route 228 =

State highway in Aroostook County, Maine, US

State Route 228
- SR 228 in red, SR 228 Truck in blue

Route information
- Maintained by MaineDOT
- Length: 16.75 mi (26.96 km)
- Existed: 1939–present

Major junctions
- West end: SR 164 in Washburn
- East end: SR 161B in Caribou

Location
- Country: United States
- State: Maine
- Counties: Aroostook

Highway system
- Maine State Highway System; Interstate; US; State; Auto trails; Lettered highways
← SR 227	→ SR 229

State Route 228 (SR 228) is a state highway located in Aroostook County in northeastern Maine. It begins at State Route 164 in Washburn and runs north, then east, to State Route 161B in Caribou. SR 228 is signed as an east–west highway but occupies an alignment resembling an inverted letter V. It provides local access to Perham and Woodland which are bypassed by SR 164 between Washburn and Caribou. It is the only highway in Maine to have a designated truck route (see below).

== Route description ==
SR 228 begins in downtown Washburn at SR 164. The highway leaves downtown as Hines Street, intersecting its truck route (Victoria Street, a bypass of downtown for large vehicles) before turning north. SR 228 turns northwest along Perham Road (signed east) and runs along the Bangor Aroostook Rail Trail. The highway nicks the northeastern corner of Wade, then crosses into the town of Perham. Upon reaching the village of Spaulding, SR 228 turns sharply east onto Woodland Center Road, then crosses into Woodland. The road continues east through Woodland Center and continues into the city of Caribou as Woodland Road, where SR 228 turns southeast and terminates at SR 161B (Sweden Street) west of downtown.

== Major junctions ==
The entire route is in Aroostook County.

Location	mi	km	Destinations	Notes
Washburn	0.00	0.00	SR 164 (Main Street) – Caribou, Presque Isle	Western terminus
Washburn	0.06	0.097	SR 228T south (Victoria Street)	Northern terminus of SR 228T
Caribou	16.75	26.96	SR 161B (Sweden Street) – New Sweden, Fort Kent, Presque Isle	Eastern terminus
1.000 mi = 1.609 km; 1.000 km = 0.621 mi

== Truck route ==
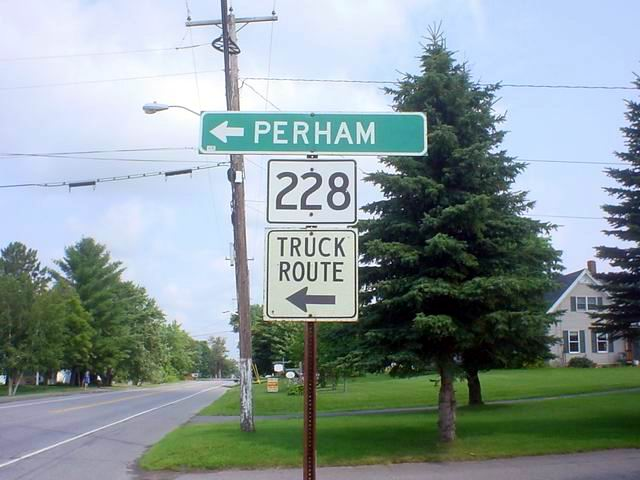
SR 228 Truck Route signage as seen from SR 164 northbound

State Route 228 Truck
- Location: Washburn
- Length: 0.60 mi (970 m)
- Existed: 1964–present

State Route 228 Truck (internally designated SR 228T) is a 0.60-mile (0.97 km) truck route of SR 228 that bypasses downtown Washburn. Its southern terminus is at SR 164 (Main Street) on the west side of downtown Washburn. Its northern terminus is at SR 228 (Hines Street) just north of downtown.

The short route initially proceeds west from SR 164 as Canaan Street, crosses the Bangor Aroostook Rail Trail, then turns north onto Victoria Street. The road heads north, paralleling SR 164, and terminates at SR 228 just north of downtown.

SR 228T is the only state-numbered truck route designated by the Maine Department of Transportation. The road is not signed with standard "Truck" banners, but rather with "truck route" regulatory signs.

=== Junction list ===
The entire route is in Washburn, Aroostook County.

mi	km	Destinations	Notes
0.00	0.00	SR 164 (Main Street) – Caribou, Presque Isle	Southern terminus
0.60	0.97	SR 228 (Hines Street) – Perham	Northern terminus
1.000 mi = 1.609 km; 1.000 km = 0.621 mi
