= Maine School Administrative District 45 =

School district in Aroostock County, Maine, United States

Location
- Coordinates: 46°47′24.9″N 68°09′10.1″W

Maine School Administrative District 45 is a public school district in the U.S. state of Maine. It encompasses the rural Aroostook County towns of Washburn, Wade, and Perham. Two schools operate in the district, David J Lyon Washburn District Elementary School, and Washburn District High School.
