= Maine State Route 164 =

State highway in Maine, United States

State Route 164

Route information
- Maintained by MaineDOT
- Length: 23.63 mi (38.03 km)
- Existed: 1925–present

Major junctions
- South end: US 1 in Presque Isle
- SR 228 in Washburn; SR 161B in Caribou
- North end: US 1 in Caribou

Location
- Country: United States
- State: Maine
- Counties: Aroostook

Highway system
- Maine State Highway System; Interstate; US; State; Auto trails; Lettered highways
← SR 163	→ SR 165

State Route 164 (SR 164) is part of Maine's system of numbered state highways. It runs 23.6 miles (38.0 km) from Presque Isle to Caribou. It begins at an intersection with U.S. Route 1 (US 1) just north of downtown Presque Isle and travels northwest along the Aroostook River to Crouseville and Washburn. In Washburn, it intersects SR 228. From there, it heads northeast to downtown Caribou. In Caribou, it splits into a one-way pair and also forms a concurrency with SR 161B. The southbound direction of travel through Caribou (physically traveling mostly west) intersects SR 89 at its western terminus. After traveling through the center of the city, the road heads south along Main Street to end at US 1 south of the city center.

== Major junctions ==
The entire route is in Aroostook County.

Location	mi	km	Destinations	Notes
Presque Isle	0.00	0.00	US 1 (Main Street) / Reach Road – Caribou, Presque Isle, Van Buren, Mars Hill	
Washburn	9.92	15.96	SR 228T north (Canaan Avenue) – Perham	Southern terminus of SR 228T
Washburn	10.38	16.70	SR 228 east (Hines Street) – Perham	Western terminus of SR 228
Caribou	20.10	32.35	SR 161B (Hatch Drive)	Southern end of SR 161B concurrency; SR 164 and SR 161B in one-way pairs
Caribou	20.74	33.38	SR 161 south (Fort Street) to US 1 / SR 161	Northern end of SR 161B concurrency
Caribou	23.63	38.03	US 1 (Presque Isle Road) / Dow Siding Road – Presque Isle, Limestone	
1.000 mi = 1.609 km; 1.000 km = 0.621 mi: Concurrency terminus
