= Benjamin C. Wilder House =

Historic house in Maine, United States

- U.S. National Register of Historic Places
- Location within Maine Location within the United States
- Location: 1267 Main Street, Washburn, Maine
- Coordinates: 46°47′20″N 68°09′21″W
- Built: 1852
- NRHP reference No.: 87000946
- Added to NRHP: June 12, 1987

The Benjamin C. Wilder House is an historic house at 1267 Main Street (Maine State Route 164) in Washburn, Maine, United States. Built about 1852, it is a well-preserved example of mid-19th century vernacular architecture in northern Aroostook County, built in the first decade after widespread settlement began of the area. The house was listed on the National Register of Historic Places in 1987. It is now owned by the local Salmon Brook Historical Society and operated as a historic house museum.

== Description and history ==
The Wilder House is located in the center of the rural village of Washburn, set back from the east side of Main Street on the north side of the town common, which is bounded on its south by Wilder Street. It is a 1 1/2-story wood-frame structure, five bays wide and a single room deep, with a side-gable roof, clapboard siding, and a foundation of granite and concrete blocks. Oriented to face south, the main facade has a single-story porch, supported by Tuscan columns, that extends across its full width and around to the west side. The main entrance, which is like the windows simply framed, stands in the rightmost bay. A single gabled dormer projects from the roof. A kitchen ell extends to the rear of the main block, with dormers on both sides of its gable roof, and a porch on the east side. The interior has well-preserved original plaster-and-lath walls, and an original staircase leading to the attic level.

Widespread settlement of the interior of northern Aroostook County was delayed due to uncertainties surrounding the border with neighboring New Brunswick, which threatened war in the 1830s and were resolved by the 1842 Webster-Ashburton Treaty. Washburn was probably settled soon afterward, with Isaac Wilder one of its first settlers. His nephew Benjamin probably built this house around 1852, the year of his marriage. Wilder was a merchant and farmer in the community. The house was sold by his heirs in 1920 into the Jardine family, who sold it to the Salmon Brook Historical Society. The Society operates the house as a mid 19th-century period historic house museum, with the Aroostook Agricultural Museum, which is housed in a nearby barn.

== See also ==
- National Register of Historic Places listings in Aroostook County, Maine
