= Fargo (1996 film) =

Film by Joel and Ethan Coen

- Theatrical release poster
- Directed by: Joel Coen (Note: Although the Coen brothers co-directed this film, Joel received sole credit due to Directors Guild of America regulations)
- Written by: Ethan Coen; Joel Coen
- Produced by: Ethan Coen (Note: Although the Coen brothers both produced this film, Ethan received sole credit due to Directors Guild of America regulations)
- Starring: Frances McDormand; William H. Macy; Steve Buscemi; Harve Presnell; Peter Stormare
- Cinematography: Roger Deakins
- Edited by: Roderick Jaynes (Note: Roderick Jaynes is the shared pseudonym used by the Coen brothers for their editing.)
- Music by: Carter Burwell
- Production company: Working Title Films
- Distributed by: Gramercy Pictures (United States and Canada); PolyGram Filmed Entertainment (International)
- Release dates: March 8, 1996 (United States); May 31, 1996 (United Kingdom)
- Running time: 98 minutes
- Countries: United States; United Kingdom
- Language: English
- Budget: $7 million
- Box office: $60.6 million

Fargo is a 1996 crime comedy film written, directed, produced and edited by Joel and Ethan Coen. It stars Frances McDormand, William H. Macy, Steve Buscemi, Harve Presnell, and Peter Stormare. The film follows a pregnant police chief (McDormand), who investigates after a car salesman (Macy) hires two dimwitted criminals (Buscemi and Stormare) to kidnap his wife to extort a ransom from her wealthy father.

Filmed in the United States in early 1995, Fargo premiered at the 1996 Cannes Film Festival, where it competed for the Palme d'Or. Joel Coen won the festival's Prix De La Mise En Scène (Best Director Award). The film was a critical and commercial success, earning particular acclaim for the Coens' screenplay and direction and the performances of McDormand, Macy and Buscemi. Fargo received seven Oscar nominations at the 69th Academy Awards, including Best Picture, Best Director, and Best Supporting Actor for Macy, winning two: Best Actress for McDormand and Best Original Screenplay for the Coens.

In 1998, the American Film Institute named Fargo one of the 100 greatest American films, the most recent film on that list; but it was omitted from its 2007 list. In 2006, it was selected for preservation in the United States National Film Registry by the Library of Congress as "culturally, historically, or aesthetically significant". An FX television series based on the film, Fargo, premiered in 2014.

== Plot ==
In 1987, Jerome "Jerry" Lundegaard is the executive sales manager of a Minneapolis car dealership owned by his father-in-law, Wade Gustafson. Desperate for money, Jerry plans to have his wife, Jean, kidnapped. On the recommendation of dealership mechanic and parolee Shep Proudfoot, Jerry meets Gaear Grimsrud and Carl Showalter at a bar in Fargo, North Dakota. Gaear and Carl agree to kidnap Jean in exchange for a new Oldsmobile Cutlass Ciera and half of the $80,000 ransom Jerry intends to extort from Wade.

Believing he has secured a $750,000 loan from Wade for a lucrative real estate deal, Jerry unsuccessfully tries to call off the kidnapping. Wade and his accountant Stan Grossman inform Jerry they will close the deal themselves and offer him only a modest finder's fee. Carl and Gaear kidnap Jean and transport her to a remote cabin in Moose Lake. A state trooper stops them near Brainerd for not displaying temporary registration tags. The trooper rejects Carl's clumsy bribe attempt and orders Carl out of the car. When the trooper hears Jean whimpering in the back seat, Gaear shoots him dead, then hunts down and kills two passersby who witnessed the scene.

Brainerd police chief Marge Gunderson, who is seven months pregnant, begins investigating. She correctly infers that the dead trooper was ticketing a car with dealer plates. She later learns that two men driving a dealership vehicle checked into a nearby motel with two call girls and placed a call to Shep. Marge visits Wade's dealership, where Shep feigns ignorance and Jerry nervously insists no cars are missing. While in Minneapolis, Marge reconnects with Mike Yanagita, a high school classmate, who awkwardly tries to romance Marge before breaking down, saying that his wife has died.

Jerry tells Wade the kidnappers have demanded $1 million and will deal only through him. In light of the three murders, Carl demands that Jerry hand over the $80,000 he believes is the entire ransom. Shep finds Carl with a call girl in Shep's Minneapolis apartment and beats him in retaliation for bringing Shep to the police's attention. Carl angrily calls Jerry and demands that he bring the money immediately. Wade insists on delivering the ransom and meets Carl at a parking garage. Wade refuses to hand over the money without seeing his daughter, so Carl shoots him. Wade fires back, wounding Carl in the jaw. Carl kills Wade and a garage attendant, then drives away with the cash.

On the way to Moose Lake, Carl discovers the briefcase contains $1 million. He takes out $80,000 to split with Gaear and buries the rest in the snow alongside the highway. Marge learns from a friend that Yanagita does not have a wife and is mentally ill. Reflecting on the lies, Marge returns to Wade's dealership, where an agitated Jerry again insists no cars are missing and tells Marge he will double-check the inventory. Marge sees Jerry driving off the lot and calls the state police.

At the cabin, Carl finds that Gaear killed Jean because she would not stay quiet. Carl says they should split up and leave immediately, and they argue over who will keep the Ciera. Carl insults Gaear and attempts to leave with the car, but Gaear kills him with an axe. Marge drives to Moose Lake after Mr. Mohra, a bartender to whom Carl bragged about killing someone, tips off police. She sees the Ciera, then discovers Gaear feeding Carl's body into a woodchipper. Gaear attempts to flee, but Marge shoots him in the leg and arrests him. Shortly after, Jerry is arrested by state troopers at a motel outside Bismarck, North Dakota.

Marge's husband, Norm, tells her the Postal Service has selected his painting of a mallard for a 3-cent postage stamp and complains that a Hautman brothers painting won the competition for a 29-cent stamp. Marge reminds him that smaller denomination stamps make up the difference between the face value of old stamps and the new cost of first-class postage. Norm is reassured, and the couple happily anticipates the birth of their child.

== Cast ==
- Frances McDormand as Marge Gunderson
- William H. Macy as Jerry Lundegaard
- Steve Buscemi as Carl Showalter
- Harve Presnell as Wade Gustafson
- Peter Stormare as Gaear Grimsrud
- Kristin Rudrüd as Jean Lundegaard
- Tony Denman as Scotty Lundegaard
- Steve Reevis as Shep Proudfoot
- Larry Brandenburg as Stan Grossman
- John Carroll Lynch as Norm Gunderson
- Steve Park as Mike Yanagita
- Bruce Bohne as Officer Lou Getchell
- Cliff Rakerd as Officer Olson

Other actors in smaller roles include Bain Boehlke as Mr. Mohra, Michelle Hutchison as a call girl, Larissa Kokernot and Melissa Peterman as the truck stop prostitutes, James Gaulke as the Minnesota State Trooper Gaear kills, J. Todd Anderson (the film's storyboard artist) and Michelle Suzanne LeDoux as the witnesses Gaear kills, Gary Houston as Jerry's irate customer and Sally Wingert as his wife.

KSTP-TV morning show hosts Steve and Sharon Edelman appear as themselves. Warren Keith has a voiceover role as GMAC representative Reilly Diefenbach. Singer José Feliciano has a cameo appearance as himself. Bruce Campbell has an uncredited appearance via footage from Generations, a Michigan-area soap opera he appeared on during the mid-1980s.

== Production ==
=== Casting ===
The Coens initially considered William H. Macy for a smaller role, but they were so impressed by his reading that they asked him to read for the role of Jerry. According to Macy, he was persistent in getting the role, saying: "I found out that they [the Coen brothers] were auditioning in New York still, so I got my jolly, jolly Lutheran ass on an airplane and walked in and said, 'I want to read again because I'm scared you're going to screw this up and hire someone else.' I actually said that. You know, you can't play that card too often as an actor. Sometimes it just blows up in your face, but I said, 'Guys, this is my role. I want this.'" Ethan Coen later said, "I don't think either of us [Coen brothers] realised what a tough acting challenge we were handing Bill Macy with this part. Jerry's a fascinating mix of the completely ingenuous and the utterly deceitful. Yet he's also guileless; even though he set these horrible events in motion, he's surprised when they go wrong."

Frances McDormand learned how to use and fire a gun, spent days talking with a pregnant police officer and developed a backstory for her character along with John Carroll Lynch, who played her husband. She said she may have modeled Marge on her sister, a chaplain at a women's maximum-security prison.

=== Filming ===
Fargo was filmed during the winter of 1995, mainly in the Minneapolis-St. Paul area and around Pembina County, North Dakota. Due to unusually low snowfall totals in central and southern Minnesota, scenes requiring snow-covered landscapes had to be shot in northern Minnesota and northeastern North Dakota, though not near the cities of Fargo and Brainerd. Cinematographer Roger Deakins used an Arriflex 35 BL-4 camera.

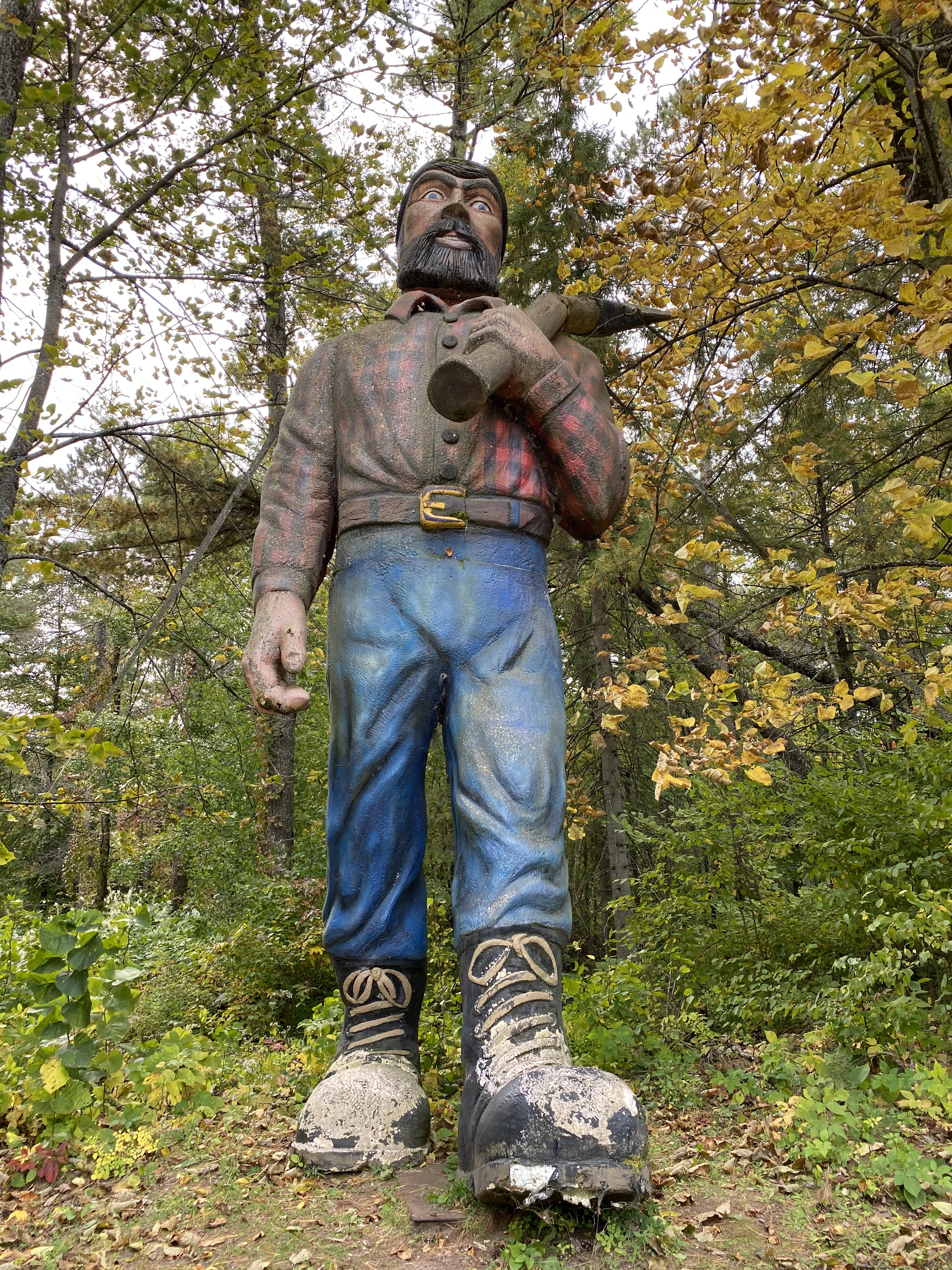
Original Paul Bunyan sculpture created by Rick Heinrichs

Jerry's initial meeting with Carl and Gaear was shot at a pool hall and bar called the King of Clubs on Central Avenue in northeast Minneapolis. It was demolished in 2003 and replaced by low-income housing. Wade's car dealership was filmed at Wally McCarthy Oldsmobile in Richfield, Minnesota, a southern suburb of Minneapolis, a site now occupied by Best Buy's national corporate headquarters. The 24-foot Paul Bunyan statue was built for the film (and subsequently dismantled) on Pembina County Highway 1, four miles west of Bathgate, North Dakota, near the Canadian border. The Blue Ox truckstop was Stockmen's Truck Stop in South St. Paul, which is still in business. Ember's, the restaurant where Jerry discusses the ransom drop with Gustafson, was located in St. Louis Park, the Coens' hometown; the building now houses a medical outpatient treatment center.

The strip club where Marge interviews the two call girls was two separate locations. Its exterior was the Lakeside Club in Mahtomedi, Minnesota, and interior the Loch Ness Lounge in Houlton, Wisconsin. The kidnappers' Moose Lake hideout stood on the shore of Square Lake, near May, Minnesota. The cabin was relocated to Barnes, Wisconsin, in 2002. The Edina police station where the interior police headquarters scenes were filmed is still in operation but has been completely rebuilt. The Carlton Celebrity Room was an actual venue in Bloomington, Minnesota, and José Feliciano did once appear there, but it had been closed for almost ten years when filming began. The Feliciano scene was shot at the Chanhassen Dinner Theatre in Chanhassen, near Minneapolis. The ransom drop was filmed in two adjacent parking garages on South 8th Street in downtown Minneapolis. Scenes in the Lundegaards' kitchen were shot in a private home on Pillsbury Avenue in Minneapolis, and the house where Mr. Mohra describes the "funny looking little guy" to police is in Hallock, in northwest Minnesota. The motel "outside of Bismarck", where the police finally catch up with Jerry, is the Hitching Post Motel in Forest Lake, north of Minneapolis. While none of Fargo was filmed in Fargo, the Fargo-Moorhead Convention & Visitors Bureau exhibits original script copies and several props used in the film, including the wood chipper prop.

=== Music ===
As with most Coen brothers films, the score was composed by Carter Burwell. The main motif is based on a Norwegian folk song, "The Lost Sheep" (Norwegian: Den bortkomne sauen). The soundtrack was released in 1996 on TVT Records, combined with selections from the score to Barton Fink.

=== Claims of factual basis ===
The film opens with the following text:

This is a true story. The events depicted in this film took place in Minnesota in 1987. At the request of the survivors, the names have been changed. Out of respect for the dead, the rest has been told exactly as it occurred.

The Coen brothers said that they based their script on an actual criminal event, but wrote a fictional story around it. Joel said: "We weren't interested in that kind of fidelity. The basic events are the same as in the real case, but the characterizations are fully imagined ... If an audience believes that something's based on a real event, it gives you permission to do things they might otherwise not accept." In 1996, Joel Coen told a reporter that—contrary to the opening graphic—the actual murders were not committed in Minnesota. Many Minnesotans speculated that the story was inspired by T. Eugene Thompson, a St. Paul attorney who was convicted of hiring a man to murder his wife in 1963, near the Coens' hometown of St. Louis Park; but the Coens said that they had never heard of Thompson. After Thompson's death in 2015, Joel Coen changed the explanation again: "[The story was] completely made up. Or, as we like to say, the only thing true about it is that it's a story."

The special edition DVD contains an account that Fargo was inspired by the 1986 murder of Helle Crafts, a Danish–American flight attendant from Connecticut at the hands of her husband, Richard, who disposed of her body through a wood chipper. In a 1998 article, the fact-checking website Snopes concluded that the "true story" claim was a prank of the kind the Coen brothers often inserted in their films. Snopes said that doubters should note that a fictitious persons disclaimer, used in works of fiction, is at the end of the film.

=== Accent ===
The film's illustrations of "Minnesota nice" and distinctive regional accents and expressions made a lasting impression on audiences; years later, locals reported continuing to field tourist requests to say "Yah, you betcha", and other lines from the films. Dialect coach Liz Himelstein said that "the accent was another character". She coached the cast using audiotapes and field trips. Another dialect coach, Larissa Kokernot (who also played one of the prostitutes), noted that the "small-town, Minnesota accent is close to the sound of the Nords and the Swedes", which is "where the musicality comes from". She taught McDormand "Minnesota nice" and the characteristic head-nodding to show agreement. The strong accent spoken by Macy's and McDormand's characters, which was exaggerated for effect, is less common in the Twin Cities area, where over 60% of the state's population lives. The Minneapolis and St. Paul dialect is characterized by the Northern Cities Vowel Shift, which is also found in other places in the Northern United States as far east as Rochester, New York.

== Release ==
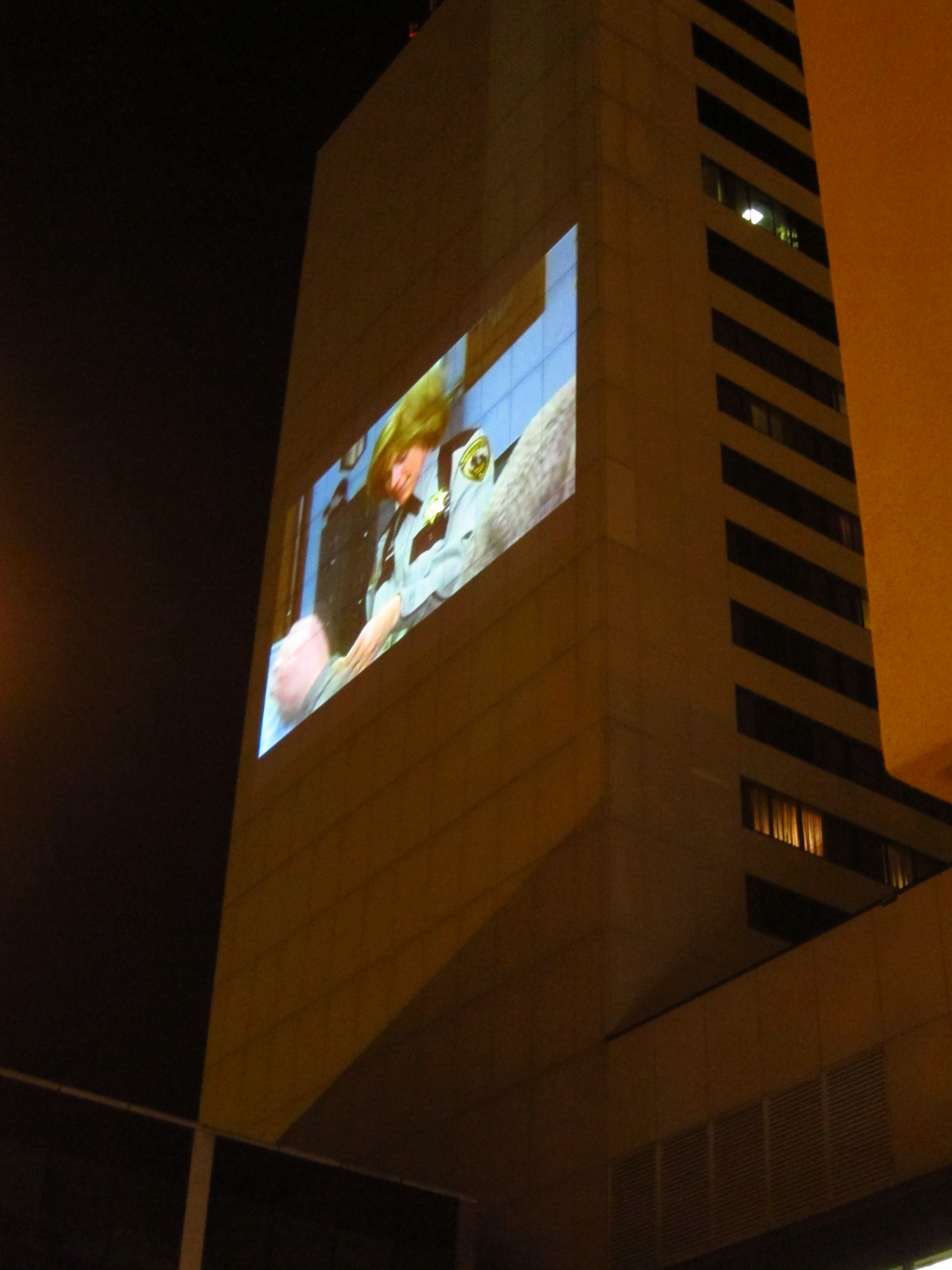
Fargo projected on the Radisson Hotel in Fargo, North Dakota

Fargo premiered at the 1996 Cannes Film Festival, where it was nominated for the competition's highest honor, the Palme d'Or. Joel Coen won the top directorial award, the Prix de la mise en scène. Subsequent notable screenings included the Pusan International Film Festival in South Korea, the Karlovy Vary International Film Festival in the Czech Republic, and the Naples Film Festival. In 2006, the sixth annual Fargo Film Festival marked Fargo's tenth anniversary by projecting the movie on the north side of Fargo's then tallest building, the Radisson Hotel.

Released theatrically in the United States on March 8, 1996, Fargo launched in 36 theaters, and grossed $1,024,137 in its first week. In the film's third week, Fargo was released in 412 theaters, and generated a total box office gross of $5,998,890. Overall it grossed $24,281,860 in the United States and Canada. Internationally, Fargo was released in Canada on April 5, 1996; in the United Kingdom on May 31, 1996, grossing $2.3 million; in Australia on June 6, 1996, grossing $1.5 million; in Spain on June 20, 1996, grossing $1.8 million; in France on September 4, 1996, grossing $3.9 million; and in Germany on November 14, 1996, grossing $2.4 million. Overall, the film's international gross was an estimated $36 million for a worldwide total of $60.6 million.

== Reception ==
On the review aggregator website Rotten Tomatoes, Fargo holds an approval rating of 95% based on 111 reviews, with an average rating of 8.8/10. The critical consensus reads: "Violent, quirky, and darkly funny, Fargo delivers an original crime story and a wonderful performance by McDormand." At Metacritic, the film has a weighted average score of 88 out of 100, based on 26 critics, indicating "universal acclaim". Audiences polled by CinemaScore gave it an average grade of "B+" on an A+ to F scale.

Frances McDormand's performance garnered critical acclaim, earning her the Academy Award for Best Actress.

Arnold Wayne Jones, writing for the Dallas Observer, called Fargo an "illuminating amalgam of emotion and thought", praising the directing and writing. In Entertainment Weekly, Lisa Schwarzbaum praised McDormand and said the film was "dizzily rich, witty, and satisfying". In The New Yorker, Anthony Lane also praised McDormand: "Her character—seven months pregnant, polite to a fault, smart yet slow—is only a breath away from caricature, yet McDormand unearths a surprising decency there, and in the process she pretty well rescues the film." USA Today journalist Mike Clark also praised the performance of McDormand:

McDormand's uproariously sly-spry performance connects with Roger Deakins' bleakly beautiful photography to create one of the Coens' most consistently successful outings, albeit one that plays it even closer to the vest than usual. [...] For a nifty bit of nastiness from two of our most dependably provocative filmmakers, Fargo will fill the bill.

The Time critic Richard Corliss criticized Fargo for its accents: "After some superb mannerist films, the Coens are back in the deadpan realist territory of Blood Simple, but without the cinematic elan." Conversely, Janet Maslin, in The New York Times, deemed Fargo "much more stylish and entertaining" than Blood Simple. James Berardinelli, writing for ReelThoughts, gave the film three out of five, writing that it was "easy to admire what the Coens are trying to do in Fargo, but more difficult to actually like the film". John Simon of the National Review wrote that "the Coen brothers' Fargo is their best film so far, which isn't saying very much ... Fargo could have been a nice little film noir if they hadn't compounded it with black comedy, absurdism, and folksy farce: Scandinavian–American midwesterners up, or down, to their hickish shenanigans. Some of this surprisingly, works, some of it ranges from the unpalatable to the indigestible".

Gene Siskel and Roger Ebert said Fargo was the best film of 1996, with Ebert later ranking it fourth on his list of the best films of the 1990s. Fargo was added to the National Film Registry for preservation by the National Film Preservation Board on December 27, 2006. In 2010, the Independent Film & Television Alliance selected the film as one of its "30 Most Significant Independent Films" of the last 30 years. In 2006, the Writers Guild of America ranked the film's screenplay the 32nd greatest ever. Future North Dakota governor Doug Burgum, whose company Great Plains Software had its initial public offering during the film's release, recalled that during investor meetings "100 percent of the first question was about the movie. We had no paper shredders in our office, only woodchippers, we'd answer with a straight face. They'd say: 'Really?!'" In 2016, the Directors Guild of America ranked the film 52nd on its list of The 80 Best-Directed Films since the Guild’s founding in 1936. The February 2020 issue of New York Magazine lists Fargo as among "The Best Movies That Lost Best Picture at the Oscars."

=== Accolades ===
Award⁣	Date of ceremony⁣	Category⁣	Recipients⁣	Result⁣	Ref.⁣
Academy Awards⁣	March 24, 1997⁣	Best Picture⁣	Ethan Coen	Nominated⁣	⁣
Academy Awards⁣	March 24, 1997⁣	Best Director⁣	Joel Coen⁣	Nominated	⁣
Academy Awards⁣	March 24, 1997⁣	Best Actress⁣	Frances McDormand⁣	Won⁣	⁣
Academy Awards⁣	March 24, 1997⁣	Best Supporting Actor⁣	William H. Macy⁣	Nominated⁣	⁣
Academy Awards⁣	March 24, 1997⁣	Best Original Screenplay⁣	Joel and Ethan Coen⁣	Won⁣	⁣
Academy Awards⁣	March 24, 1997⁣	Best Cinematography⁣	Roger Deakins⁣	Nominated⁣	⁣
Academy Awards⁣	March 24, 1997⁣	Best Film Editing⁣	Roderick Jaynes⁣	Nominated⁣	⁣
American Cinema Editors	1996	Best Edited Feature Film	Roderick Jaynes	Nominated	
American Society of Cinematographers	1996	Outstanding Achievement in Cinematography	Roger Deakins	Nominated	
BAFTA Film Awards	April 29, 1997	Best Direction	Joel Coen	Won	
BAFTA Film Awards	April 29, 1997	Best Film	Fargo	Nominated	
BAFTA Film Awards	April 29, 1997	Best Actress in a Leading Role	Frances McDormand	Nominated	
BAFTA Film Awards	April 29, 1997	Best Original Screenplay	Joel and Ethan Coen	Nominated	
BAFTA Film Awards	April 29, 1997	Best Cinematography	Roger Deakins	Nominated	
BAFTA Film Awards	April 29, 1997	Best Editing	Roderick Jaynes	Nominated	
Belgian Film Critics Association	1997	Grand Prix	Fargo	Nominated	
Cannes Film Festival	May 1996	Best Director	Joel Coen	Won	
Cannes Film Festival	May 1996	Palme d'Or	Fargo	Nominated	
Critics' Choice Awards	January 20, 1997	Best Picture	Fargo	Won	
Critics' Choice Awards	January 20, 1997	Best Actress	Frances McDormand	Won	
Golden Globe Awards	January 19, 1997	Best Motion Picture – Musical or Comedy	Fargo	Nominated	
Golden Globe Awards	January 19, 1997	Best Director	Joel Coen	Nominated	
Golden Globe Awards	January 19, 1997	Best Actress – Motion Picture Comedy or Musical	Frances McDormand	Nominated	
Golden Globe Awards	January 19, 1997	Best Screenplay	Joel and Ethan Coen	Nominated	
Golden Satellite Awards	January 15, 1997	Best Film	Fargo	Won	
Golden Satellite Awards	January 15, 1997	Best Director	Joel Coen	Won	
Golden Satellite Awards	January 15, 1997	Best Actress – Drama	Frances McDormand	Won	
Golden Satellite Awards	January 15, 1997	Best Actor - Drama	William H. Macy	Nominated	
Golden Satellite Awards	January 15, 1997	Best Supporting Actor – Drama	Steve Buscemi	Nominated	
Golden Satellite Awards	January 15, 1997	Best Editing	Roderick Jaynes	Nominated	
Golden Satellite Awards	January 15, 1997	Best Original Screenplay	Joel and Ethan Coen	Nominated	
Independent Spirit Awards	March 22, 1997	Best Film	Fargo	Won	
Independent Spirit Awards	March 22, 1997	Best Director	Joel Coen	Won	
Independent Spirit Awards	March 22, 1997	Best Male Lead	William H. Macy	Won	
Independent Spirit Awards	March 22, 1997	Best Female Lead	Frances McDormand	Won	
Independent Spirit Awards	March 22, 1997	Best Screenplay	Joel and Ethan Coen	Won	
Independent Spirit Awards	March 22, 1997	Best Cinematography	Roger Deakins	Won	
Los Angeles Film Critics Association Awards	December 1996	Best Film	Fargo	Runner-up	
Los Angeles Film Critics Association Awards	December 1996	Best Director	Joel Coen	Runner-up	
Los Angeles Film Critics Association Awards	December 1996	Best Actress	Frances McDormand	Runner-up	
Los Angeles Film Critics Association Awards	December 1996	Best Screenplay	Joel and Ethan Coen	Won	
National Board of Review	1996	Top Ten Films	Fargo	3rd place	
National Board of Review	1996	Best Director	Joel Coen	Won	
National Board of Review	1996	Best Actress	Frances McDormand	Won	
National Film Preservation Board	December 27, 2006	National Film Registry	Fargo	Added	
New York Film Critics Circle	January 5, 1997	Best Film	Fargo	Won	
New York Film Critics Circle	January 5, 1997	Best Actress	Frances McDormand	Nominated	
Producers Guild of America Awards	March 12, 1997	Outstanding Producer of Theatrical Motion Pictures	Ethan Coen	Nominated	
Saturn Awards	July 23, 1997	Best Action or Adventure Film	Fargo	Won	
Saturn Awards	July 23, 1997	Best Actress	Frances McDormand	Nominated	
Saturn Awards	July 23, 1997	Best Director	Joel Coen	Nominated	
Screen Actors Guild Awards	February 22, 1997	Outstanding Performance by a Female Actor in a Leading Role	Frances McDormand	Won	
Screen Actors Guild Awards	February 22, 1997	Outstanding Performance by a Male Actor in a Supporting Role	William H. Macy	Nominated	
Writers Guild of America Awards	March 16, 1997	Best Original Screenplay	Joel and Ethan Coen	Won	
London Film Critics Circle	March 2, 1997	Film of the Year	Fargo	Won	
London Film Critics Circle	March 2, 1997	Director of the Year	Joel Coen	Won	
London Film Critics Circle	March 2, 1997	Screenwriter of the Year	Joel and Ethan Coen	Won	
London Film Critics Circle	March 2, 1997	Actress of the Year	Frances McDormand	Won	
Bodil Awards	1997	Best American Film	Joel Coen	Won	

==== Best-of lists ====
The film is recognized by American Film Institute in these lists:

- 1998: AFI's 100 Years...100 Movies - #84
- 2000: AFI's 100 Years...100 Laughs - #93
- 2003: AFI's 100 Years...100 Heroes & Villains - Marge Gunderson - #33 Hero

== Home media ==
Fargo has been released in several formats: VHS, LaserDisc, DVD, Blu-ray, and iTunes download. The first home video release of the film was on October 1, 1996, on a pan and scan cassette. A collector's edition widescreen VHS was also released and included a snow globe that depicted the woodchipper scene which, when shaken, stirred up both snow and "blood". PolyGram Video released Fargo on DVD on June 25, 1997. In 2001, Metro-Goldwyn-Mayer (MGM), who acquired the rights to the film through their purchase of PolyGram's pre-March 31, 1996, library, released the film on VHS as part of its "Contemporary Classics" series. A "Special Edition" DVD was released on September 30, 2003, by MGM Home Entertainment, which featured minor changes to the film, particularly with its subtitles. The opening titles stating "This is a true story" have been changed in this edition from the actual titles on the film print to digitally inserted titles. Also, the subtitle preceding Lundegaard's arrest "Outside of Bismarck, North Dakota" has been inserted digitally and moved from the bottom of the screen to the top. The special edition of Fargo was repackaged in several Coen brothers box sets and also as a double feature DVD with other MGM releases.

A Blu-ray version was released on May 12, 2009, and later in a DVD combo pack in 2010. On April 1, 2014, in commemoration for the 90th anniversary of MGM, the film was remastered in 4K and reissued again on Blu-ray. On May 3, 2017, Shout! Factory announced a 20th anniversary collector's Steelbook edition on Blu-ray, limited to 10,000 copies, which was released on August 8, 2017. On November 7, 2023, Shout! Factory released the film in a 4K Ultra HD and Blu-ray combo pack.

== Television series ==
In 1997, a pilot was filmed for an intended television series based on the film. Set in Brainerd shortly after the events of the film, it starred Edie Falco as Marge Gunderson and Bruce Bohne reprising his role as Officer Lou. It was directed by Kathy Bates and featured no involvement from the Coen brothers. The episode aired in 2003 during Trio's Brilliant But Cancelled series of failed TV shows.

A follow-up TV series inspired by the film, with the Coens as executive producers, debuted on FX in April 2014. The first season received acclaim from both critics and audiences. Existing in the same fictional continuity as the film, each season features a different story, cast, and timespan. The episode "Eating the Blame" from the first season reintroduced the buried ransom money for a minor three-episode subplot. Additional seasons have been made; the second was released on October 12, 2015; the third, on April 19, 2017; the fourth, on September 27, 2020; and the fifth season premiered on November 21, 2023.

== See also ==
- Kumiko, the Treasure Hunter—a film about a young Japanese woman who becomes obsessed with Fargo, believing the events it depicts to be real.
- Suicide of Takako Konishi
