= Sinclair, Maine =

- Unincorporated community
- Location within Maine Location within the United States
- Coordinates: 47°10′00″N 68°16′10″W
- Country: United States
- State: Maine
- County: Aroostook
- Elevation: 591 ft (180 m)
- Time zone: UTC-5 (Eastern (EST))
  - Summer (DST): UTC-4 (EDT)
- ZIP code: 04779
- Area code: 207
- GNIS feature ID: 575487

Sinclair is an unincorporated village within Square Lake unorganized territory in Aroostook County, Maine, United States. The community is located on Maine State Route 162 and the western shore of Long Lake in the northeastern part of the county, within the unorganized territory of Square Lake. Sinclair has a post office, with ZIP code 04779.

== Education ==
The Maine Department of Education takes responsibility for coordinating school assignments in the unorganized territory. As of 2025 it assigns areas in Sinclair to Maine School Administrative District 33, which operates Dr. Levesque Elementary School and Wisdom Middle/High School.

The state department of education previously operated Patrick Therriault School in Sinclair Township. The school closed in 2011, because the Maine Commissioner of Education decided to do so. The Maine Legislature, by 2011, decided that the building should be sold.
