= Maine State Route 161 =

State highway in Aroostook County, Maine, US

State Route 161
- SR 161 in red, SR 161B in blue

Route information
- Maintained by MaineDOT
- Length: 86.16 mi (138.66 km)
- Existed: 1925–present

Major junctions
- South end: Route 190 at the Canadian border in Fort Fairfield
- US 1A in Fort Fairfield; US 1 / SR 89 in Caribou; US 1 in Fort Kent; SR 11 in Fort Kent
- North end: Dickey Road in Allagash

Location
- Country: United States
- State: Maine
- Counties: Aroostook

Highway system
- Maine State Highway System; Interstate; US; State; Auto trails; Lettered highways
← SR 160	→ SR 162

State Route 161 (SR 161) is part of Maine's system of numbered state highways. It runs 86 miles (138 km) from Fort Fairfield to Allagash. It begins at the Fort Fairfield–Andover Border Crossing along the Canada–US border to Dickey Road near the confluence of the Allagash and Saint John rivers.

SR 161 runs through the communities of Fort Fairfield, Caribou, Woodland, New Sweden, Stockholm, New Canada, Fort Kent, St. John, St. Francis, and Allagash.

Most of the portion that runs through Caribou has been re-routed, due to a bypass that was completed in 2012. The two-lane bypass now carries SR 161, and the old portion that runs through downtown Caribou has been re-signed as SR 161B.

== Route description ==
The state highway begins at the US–Canadian border within the town of Fort Fairfield. To the east, the road continues as New Brunswick Route 190 towards Perth-Andover, New Brunswick. SR 161 heads northwest along Boundary Line Road, then Main Street through the center of Fort Fairfield. It begins to parallel the Aroostook River in the town and intersects U.S. Route 1A (US 1A). It heads out of the town heading northwest through an agricultural area on the road's south side with the river on the north side. The road curves to the west, intersects SR 205 at its northern terminus, crosses the Aroostook River, and enters the city of Caribou. Almost immediately, it intersects US 1 and joins the route on a concurrency around the east side of the town. The four-lane highway has a few intersections with local roads before becoming divided and has another state route, SR 89, joins the roadway for about 1/2 mile (0.80 km). After US 1 and SR 89 split from SR 161, SR 161 begins to travel along Caribou Connector, a two-lane expressway around the north side of the city's downtown. It bypasses a light industrial park and crosses over SR 89 without an interchange. It bends to the west and has an interchange with US 1 north of the downtown. Continuing west past farms on both sides of the expressway, the expressway ends at an intersection with SR 161B, the former alignment of SR 161 through Caribou.

SR 161 continues northwest out of the city limits through a rural area. It cuts across the northeast corner of Woodland only passing a few houses through the town. It enters the town of New Sweden but bypasses the town center heading diagonally through the town. Through the remainder of New Sweden, the road passes through forested areas. SR 161 heads across the southwest corner of Stockholm again heading through wooded areas. After exiting Stockholm, the road heads through the unorganized territory of Square Lake. First, the road heads past the northeastern shoreline of Madawasksa Lake where numerous houses line the lake shore. Afterwards the road heads northwest through a wooded rural area until it reaches the hamlet of Guerette. Along this stretch, several small roads lead to houses along Cross Lake. Also, SR 161 meets SR 162 at its southern terminus. Exiting the mostly wooded area, the road passes through the mostly-agricultural community of Ouellette. The road bends slightly towards the west and enters the town of New Canada. SR 161 passes the town hall of New Canada and Daigle Pond at the settlement of Daigle.

Upon entering the town of Fort Kent, SR 161 first heads past a few houses as it heads northwest towards the downtown area. Nearing the community of Bradburys, the road begins to parallel the Fish River. Heading through the town on Market Street, it heads between the river and a railroad passing many businesses and houses. At Main Street (carrying US 1), SR 161 turns towards the south along Main Street where the road heads through the main business district of the town. After passing SR 11 at its end, Main Street continues southwest. SR 161 stays on Main Street while US 1 turns onto the Clair–Fort Kent Bridge towards Canada. The road passes directly in front of the U.S. Customs station at the Fort Kent–Clair Border Crossing. Now closely paralleling the St. Johns River, Main Street continues past more houses before the surroundings become more rural. As the road passes through St. John Plantation and the town of St. Francis, some houses line the road along with local offices in each respective municipality. Upon leaving St. Francis, the road enters Allagash and heads through a wooded area. It ascends the side of a small hill away from the river but later descends towards the town center of Allagash. After passing the town offices and a small store, SR 161 officially ends at the east end of the bridge carrying the road over the Allagash River. The road continues west along state-maintained Dickey Road.

== History ==
SR 161 formerly traveled through downtown Caribou. In order to promote downtown development and reroute through heavy traffic, the Caribou Connector was proposed. Construction on the bypass began in 2010 and was completed on August 17, 2012. The old routing through Caribou subsequently became SR 161B.

Route 161 is also the original alignment of U.S. Route 1, from when the latter road had its northwestern terminus in Allagash. When US 1 was truncated to its current terminus at the international bridge in Fort Kent, the section of road between Fort Kent and Allagash became an extension of SR 161, which previously ended in Fort Kent.

== Junction list ==
The entire route is in Aroostook County.

Location	mi	km	Destinations	Notes
Fort Fairfield	0.00	0.00	Route 190 east – Perth-Andover	Fort Fairfield–Andover Border Crossing; Maine –New Brunswick state/provincial line (Canada–United States border)
Fort Fairfield	2.41	3.88	US 1A (Presque Isle Street / Bridge Street) to SR 167 – Mars Hill, Limestone	
Caribou	12.51	20.13	SR 205 south (East Presque Isle Road) / River Road – Presque Isle	Northern terminus of SR 205
Caribou	12.80	20.60	US 1 south / SR 161B north (Fort Street) – Presque Isle	Southern end of US 1 concurrency; southern terminus of SR 161B
Caribou	13.37	21.52	SR 89 west (High Street) – Caribou Business District	Southern end of SR 89 concurrency
Caribou	13.90	22.37	US 1 north / SR 89 east – Limestone	Northern end of US 1 / SR 89 concurrencies
Caribou	15.86– 16.29	25.52– 26.22	US 1 (Van Buren Road) – Van Buren, Caribou	Interchange
Caribou	17.44	28.07	SR 161B south (Sweden Street) – Caribou	Northern terminus of SR 161B
Square Lake	41.15	66.22	SR 162 north (Sinclair Road) – Frenchville	Southern terminus of SR 162
Fort Kent	57.73	92.91	US 1 south (East Main Street) / Soucy Street – Madawaska	Southern end of US 1 concurrency
Fort Kent	58.23	93.71	SR 11 south (Pleasant Street) / Blockhouse Road	Northern terminus of SR 11
Fort Kent	58.68	94.44	US 1 north (Clair–Fort Kent Bridge) – Clair, N.B.	Northern end of US 1 concurrency
Allagash	86.16	138.66	Dickey Road	
1.000 mi = 1.609 km; 1.000 km = 0.621 mi: Concurrency terminus

== Auxiliary route ==
State Route 161B
- Location: Caribou
- Length: 3.62 mi (5.83 km)
- Existed: 2012–present

State Route 161 Business, signed as SR 161B, is a 3.62-mile (5.83 km) business route of SR 161 located in Caribou. It was designated in 2012 when SR 161 was moved to a new bypass around the city. Its southern terminus is at US 1 and SR 161 south of downtown. Its northern terminus is at SR 161 where it meets the northern end of the bypass. SR 161B is signed as a suffixed route, lacking the typical "Business" banner of Maine's other business routes.

SR 161B begins at the intersection of Fort Street and US 1 southeast of the city's downtown. The state route heads west along Fort Street before reaching Main Street (SR 164). The routes head north along Main Street through a residential neighborhood. After marking a few curves and crossing over Caribou Stream, the two routes split into a one-way pair through the downtown business district. Northbound SR 161B continues north along Main Street while the southbound travels along Hatch Drive. The northbound route heads north from this point and intersects SR 89 at its western terminus (High Street). SR 161B north turns to the west on Herschel Street passing numerous businesses. After making passing many businesses, the road heads south along Prospect Street for one block before rejoining the southbound side of the route. SR 164's routing through here is similar, though its northbound direction has it along Washburn Street and Hatch Drive while its southbound direction has it along Summer Street. SR 161B heads west along Sweden Street and later northwest. It passes many houses, businesses, and Caribou High School before reaching the eastern terminus of SR 228. Continuing northwest, SR 161B and Sweden Street pass more houses but some farmland begins to line the road. The state route ends at an intersection with SR 161 which is also the terminus of a two-lane expressway carrying SR 161.

Major junctions

The entire route is in Caribou, Aroostook County.

mi	km	Destinations	Notes
0.00	0.00	US 1 / SR 161 (Fort Street) – Fort Fairfield, Loring, Presque Isle	
0.26	0.42	SR 164 north (Main Street)	Southern end of SR 164 concurrency
0.79– 0.83	1.27– 1.34	SR 89 east (High Street) – Limestone	Western terminus of SR 89 (northbound SR 161B only)
1.18	1.90	SR 164 south (Summer Street) – Washburn	Northern end of SR 164 concurrency
2.00	3.22	SR 228 west – Woodland	Eastern terminus of SR 228
3.62	5.83	SR 161 (Sweden Street) – New Sweden, Presque Isle, Van Buren	
1.000 mi = 1.609 km; 1.000 km = 0.621 mi: Concurrency terminus
