= Lagassey Farm =

- Formerly listed on the U.S. National Register of Historic Places
- U.S. Historic district
- Location within Maine Location within the United States
- Location: 786 Main St., Saint Agatha, Maine
- Coordinates: 47°12′56″N 68°16′14″W
- Area: 162 acres (66 ha)
- Built: 1916
- Built by: Louis Ouellette
- Architectural style: Late 19th And Early 20th Century American Movements, Acadian Barn
- NRHP reference No.: 08001356

Significant dates
- Added to NRHP: January 21, 2009
- Removed from NRHP: September 21, 2020

The Lagassey Farm is a historic farmstead at 786 Main Street in St. Agatha, Maine. The 162-acre (66 ha) property is locally significant as a farm property that was worked continuously by the same family for more than 150 years, dating to the period of the area's earliest settlement. Its surviving buildings are all 20th century structures, but may contain elements of older buildings. The property was listed on the National Register of Historic Places in 2009, and was delisted in 2020.

== Description and history ==
The Lagassey Farm is set about 3 miles (4.8 km) east of the main village of St. Agatha, on Main Street (Maine State Route 162). It consists of a roughly wedge-shaped parcel, 162 acres (66 ha) in size, with about 1,600 feet (490 m) of frontage on Long Lake at the northeastern end, and 900 feet (270 m) of width at its southwestern end, about 1.35 miles (2.17 km) away. The property is a combination of woodland and open fields, and includes the narrow strip of land between Main Street and the lake. Of the 91 acres (37 ha) of agricultural fields, about half are under a federal crop protection program and are normally out of production except for period mowing.

The farmhouse is set on the southwest side of Main Street. It is a two-story wood frame structure, with an asphalt shingle roof and a concrete foundation. The front facade (facing northeast) is three bays wide on the first level and two on the second. A single-story hip-roof porch extends across the front and around to the left, with a solid shingled balustrade and square posts. The main entrance is off-center in the central bay, with a single sash window to its left and a double sash window to its right. The second level has a pair of symmetrically-placed sash windows. The southeast and northwest elevations have two sash windows at each level, the southeast also having a secondary entrance between the windows. The interior follows a fairly typical central-hall plan, with four rooms on each floor.

The property (or at least some property in the area) was known to be in the hands of Joseph Lagasse as early as 1874, although he did not receive a deed for this property until 1892. It was a fairly common practice of the period to require homesteaders to clear and develop land before they would be granted title. In proceedings relating to an 1874 court case over conflicting land claims, Lagasse claimed to have occupied the land in 1851. His 1892 deed was for 169 acres (68 ha); the property has since shrunk due to the sale of house lots along its edges. The present house was built in 1946, replacing Joseph Lagasse's original homestead. When the property was surveyed in 2008 for listing on the National Register of Historic Places, a number of outbuildings; including a barn and granary containing elements of 19th-century buildings, were describe. It is unclear whether these buildings are still standing; they do not appear on satellite views of the property.
