= Maine State Route 162 =

State highway in Aroostook County, Maine, US

State Route 162

Route information
- Maintained by MaineDOT
- Length: 16.83 mi (27.09 km)

Major junctions
- South end: SR 161 near Sinclair
- North end: US 1 in Frenchville

Location
- Country: United States
- State: Maine
- Counties: Aroostook

Highway system
- Maine State Highway System; Interstate; US; State; Auto trails; Lettered highways
← SR 161	→ SR 163

State Route 162 (SR 162) is a 16.8-mile-long (27.0 km) state route in Maine, United States, from SR 161 near Sinclair to U.S. Route 1 (US 1) in Frenchville. Part of SR 162 runs along the shore of Long Lake. SR 161 can be used as a connector towards Madawaska and other local areas.

== Route description ==
The state highway begins at a rural intersection with SR 161 in rural Cross Lake Township, a subset of the Square Lake unorganized territory. SR 162 heads north through a forested area before curving to the east where it then parallels the northern shoreline of Mud Lake. Houses and a campground are located between the road and the lake. The road then enters the center of Sinclair, an unincorporated settlement within Square Lake. The road passes some houses and a post office before making a 90-degree turn to the north at Shore Road and a general store. SR 162 now follows the shoreline of Long Lake where again numerous houses are located between the road and the lake though further up the road, SR 162 runs much closer to the lake with only a narrow grass buffer between the road and the lake. The road briefly heads north, turns to the northeast, then eventually curves to the northwest at Long Lake Seaplane Base. A wooded area generally follows the west side of the road until the road enters the town of St. Agatha where farmland is located along the west side of the road.

SR 162 continues heading northwest closely following the lake's shoreline. As the road gets closer to the center of St. Agatha, more houses line the road (including the east side of the road) and some businesses including a motel and a public boat ramp. In front of the town hall, the road curves away from the shoreline heading to the west and heads into the town center. The town's post office, library, churches, and a middle school are located along SR 162 through here. Heading away from the town center, the road eventually heads northwest again and begins a slight descent into Frenchville generally following Burgoin Brook. At the bottom of the slope, SR 162 ends at US 1 in the center of Frenchville, near the St. John River and the Canada–US border.

== Major junctions ==
The entire route is in Aroostook County.

Location	mi	km	Destinations	Notes
Square Lake	0.00	0.00	SR 161 (Caribou Road) – Caribou, Fort Kent	
Frenchville	16.83	27.09	US 1 (Main Street) – Fort Kent, Madawaska, Edmundston	
1.000 mi = 1.609 km; 1.000 km = 0.621 mi
