= Fort Fairfield–Andover Border Crossing =

Canada–United States border crossing

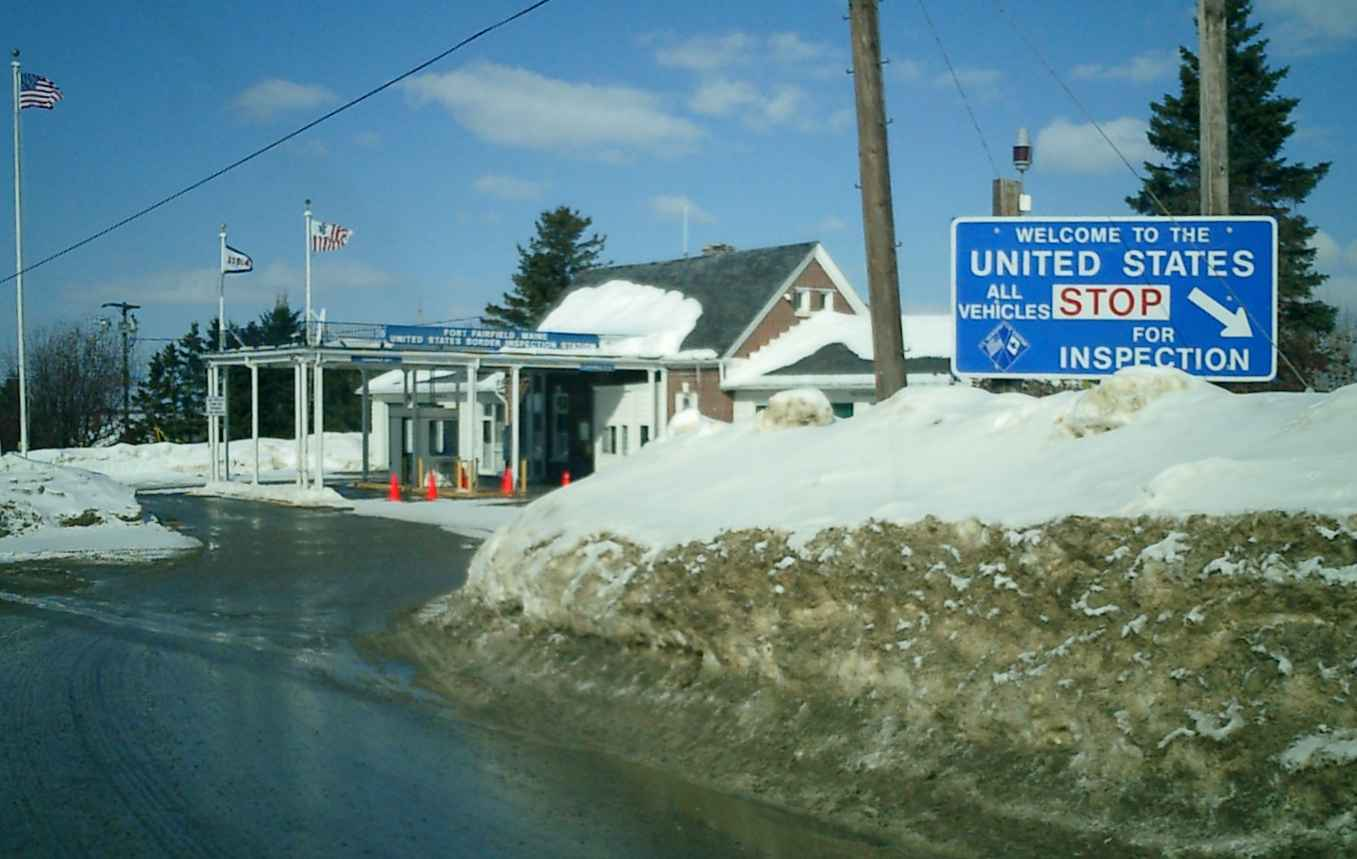
- The US Border Inspection Station at Fort Fairfield, ME

Location
- Country: United States; Canada
- Location: SR 161 / Route 190; US Port: 4 Boundary Line Road, Fort Fairfield, ME 04742; Canadian Port: 6 Route 190, Carlingford NB E7H 5H6
- Coordinates: 46.765331°N 67.789389°W

Details
- Opened: 1873

Website
- Official US web site; Official Canadian website
- U.S. Inspection Station-Fort Fairfield, Maine
- U.S. National Register of Historic Places
- MPS: U.S. Border Inspection Stations MPS
- NRHP reference No.: 14000555
- Added to NRHP: September 10, 2014

The Fort Fairfield–Andover Border Crossing is an international border crossing between the towns of Fort Fairfield, Maine, United States, and Southern Victoria, Canada on the Canada–US border, joining Maine State Route 161 (Boundary Line Road) and New Brunswick Route 190 (Fort Road). The United States border station was built in 1933, and was listed on the National Register of Historic Places in 2014. The Canada border station was built in 2007, replacing the previous facility that was built in 1954. This crossing was a historical flashpoint during the bloodless Aroostook War of the 1830s, in which the US and Great Britain disputed the border's location. That dispute was ended with the Webster-Ashburton Treaty in 1842.

== United States station ==
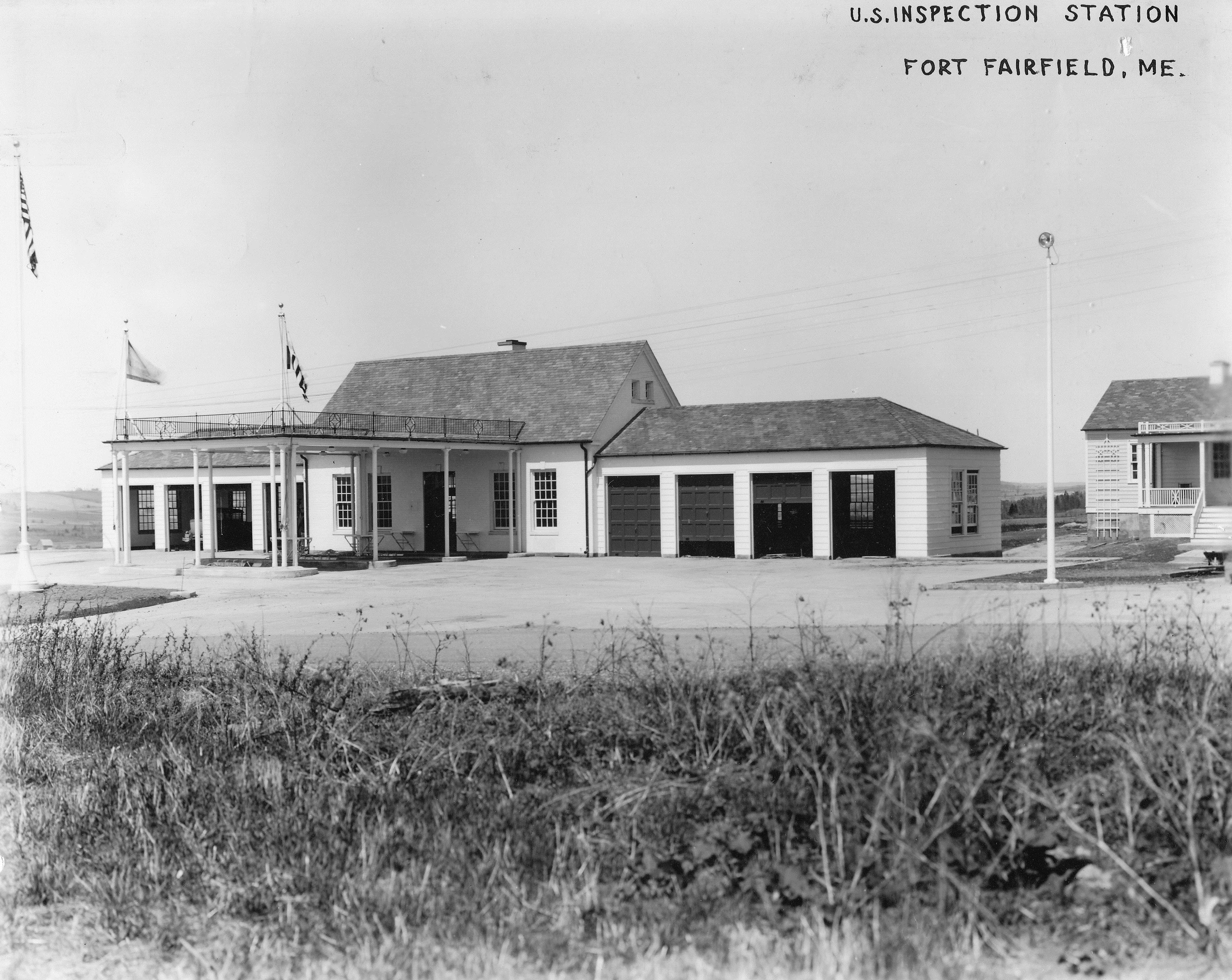
Fort Fairfield border station as seen in 1934

Open 24 hours a day, the United States border station is located about 100 feet (30 m) west of the international border, on the north side of Boundary Line Road. It consists of a single Colonial Revival brick building, with flanking garage sections (for performing vehicle inspections), and a projecting two-lane porte-cochere. The building is 1 1/2 stories in height, five bays wide, and topped by a gable roof. On either side are banks of four garage bays, some of which have been repurposed as office space and no longer serve their historic function. The main entrance to the building is now through a lobby area in one of the former garage bays on the west side. The interior of the building is divided into sections for customs and immigration processing respectively.

Prior to the construction of this station, customs and immigration formalities took place at offices in the town of Fort Fairfield. With the advent of increased automobile traffic in the 1920s, as well as the need to interdict the movement of contraband liquor due to Prohibition, the federal government realized the need for border stations where immigration formalities and vehicle inspections could be performed close to the border, and consequently planned the construction of a series of such stations. The Fort Fairfield station is a "Type 1" rural station that was probably designed by Louis A. Simon, head of the Office of the Supervising Architect of the United States Treasury Department, and was built in 1933 with funding from the Public Works Administration. It is the only surviving station of this type to retain the original height of its porte-cochere. It was listed on the National Register of Historic Places in 2014 for its architecture and historical associations.

== Canada Border Inspection station ==
The Canada border station is one of the few stations that is larger than the corresponding US station. It includes two buildings located in Carlingford NB on route 190. The current border station was built in 2007. Prior to that, Canada used a 1950s-era brick facade template similar to that still in use at the Piegan–Carway Border Crossing.

== See also ==
- List of Canada–United States border crossings
- National Register of Historic Places listings in Aroostook County, Maine
