= Paul Carmel Laporte =

Canadian physician (1885–1973)

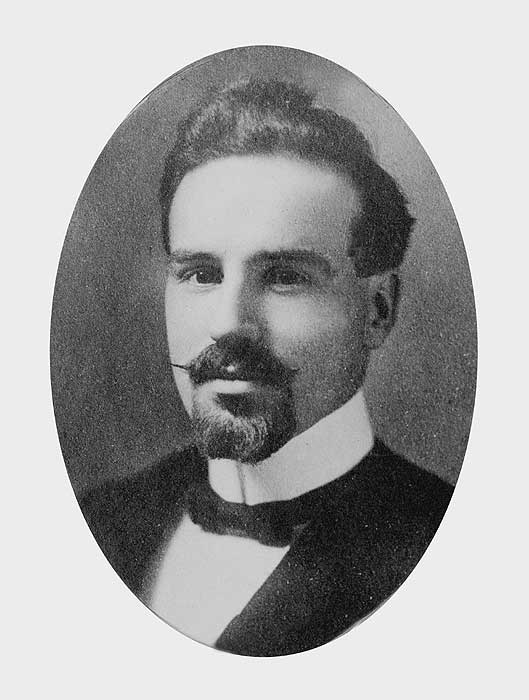
- Paul Carmel Laporte circa. 1910
- Born: July 16, 1885; Verchères, Quebec
- Died: July 25, 1973 (aged 88); Edmundston, New Brunswick

Paul Carmel Laporte (July 16, 1885 – July 25, 1973) was a Canadian physician, businessman and artist. After studying medicine in Montreal, which he financed by working as an apprentice sculptor, Laporte became a physician in New Brunswick. In addition to founding a hospital, two museums, the first French-language radio station in Atlantic Canada, a construction company, and many other projects, he taught art as a volunteer for forty years. He is considered a pioneer of the visual arts in Madawaska, on the US–Canadian border, and many of his students have had a major impact on Acadian culture.

== Biography ==
=== Origins ===
Paul Carmel Laporte was born on 16 July 1885, in Verchères, Quebec. His parents were Jean-Baptiste Laporte and Arthémise Lenoblet, married in the town of Contrecœur. His father, Jean-Baptiste Laporte, was born on February 10, 1840, in Lanoraie and died on 6 May 1928, in Verchères. His father was a physician and a member of the Canadian Pontifical Zouave Battalion. His mother, Arthémise Lenoblet-Duplessis, was born on 17 June 1850, in Lanoraie and died on 27 November 1934, in Maisonneuve, now a district of Montreal.

Paul Carmel Laporte was the third son of a large family, all born in Verchères. His predecessors were Blanche (1876–1965), Yvonne Bernadette (1877–?), Anna Maria (1879–1968), Pio Héliodore (1880–1939), Sidney (1881–1966) and Démétrie (1884-19??). The youngest are Marius (1886–?), Blandine (1887–1919) and Gabrielle (1889–1899).

=== Education ===
Paul-Carmel Laporte took an interest in sculpture as a child, then studied painting in his teens. He entered the Collège de Verchères, graduating from high school at the age of 14. He then apprenticed with a Montreal cabinetmaker and sculptor. He attended various evening classes offered by the Saint-Jean-Baptiste Society at the Monument national, where he would have rubbed shoulders with artists such as Elzéar Soucy and Alfred Laliberté. He then worked as a sculptor to pay for his medical studies. In 1905, he enrolled as an undergraduate at Université Laval de Montréal, now Université de Montréal, and was later admitted to the Faculty of Medicine. In the summer of his third year, he practiced as a clerk-doctor in the Baker Brook area of New Brunswick. In 1910, he obtained his degree of Doctor of Medicine cum laude and his Certification in General surgery from the Royal College of Physicians of Canada.

=== Career in Madawaska ===
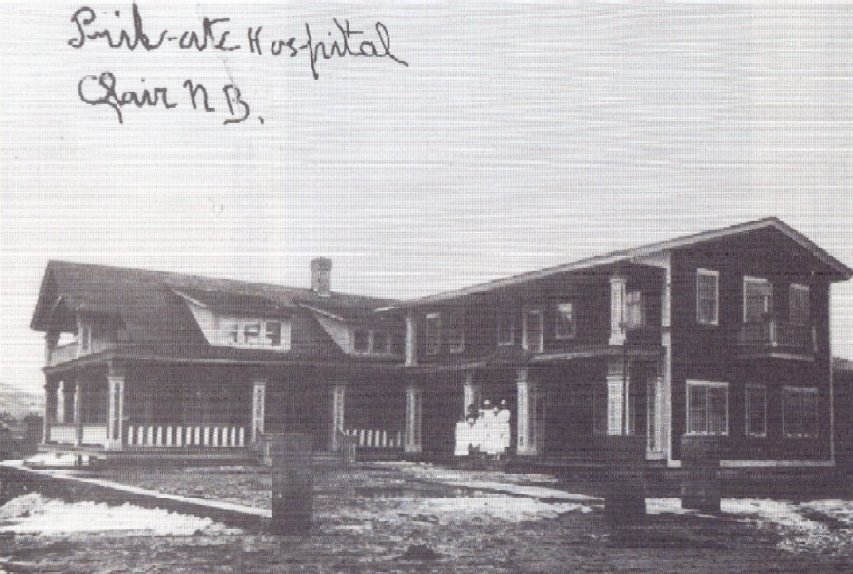
P.C. Laporte Hospital in 1920

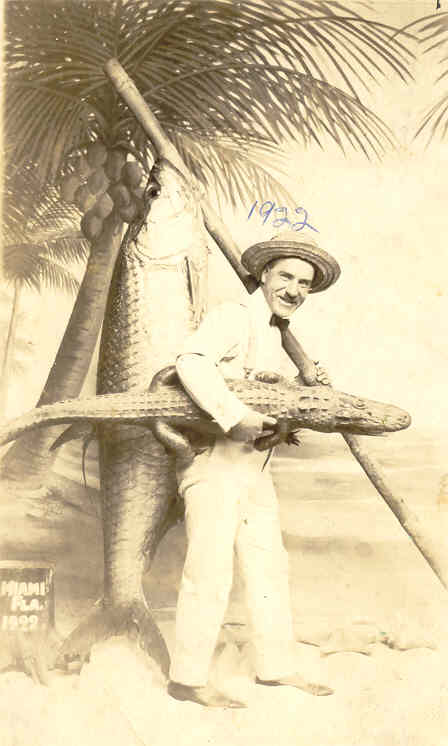
Paul Carmel Laporte in 1922

Upon receiving his doctorate, Paul Carmel Laporte moved with two of his brothers to Madawaska, New Brunswick. Pio Héliodore was also a doctor, while Sydney was a photographer. Following the death of Dr. Rouleau, Paul Carmel opened a practice in Grand Falls and obtained a license to practice medicine in the neighboring U.S. state of Maine. It was while singing in the Saint-Léonard choir that he met his future wife, Marthe Violette, born in Maine on 20 October 1887. They married on 20 October 1910, and had two sons, Murillo, and Alban, who studied at University of St. Joseph College in Memramcook.

The couple remained in Grand Falls until early 1913, when Paul Carmel was called to Connors to replace Dr. Nolin. In 1915, with the help of Dr. Page of Fort Kent, he opened the P.C. Laporte Hospital in Clair, serving the western part of the county. Built on the site of the Canada Hotel, the two-storey building had four rooms, ten beds and an operating room; nurses were also trained. The hospital was transferred to the Clair Red Cross Society on 12 November 1928. On 1 November 1931, the P.C. Laporte Hospital was destroyed by fire, and patients were transferred to the upper floors of the Clair House Hotel.

Laporte moved to Edmundston in 1932. He became medical officer at the city's military training camp, medical officer of health and coroner for Madawaska County, and lecturer for the Red Cross and St. John Ambulance. He studied dentistry at the Université de Montréal in the late 1930s. He then served two terms as president of the Société des médecins du Nouveau-Brunswick (New Brunswick Society of Physicians).

Laporte founded Compagnie de Construction Madawaska Ltée. In Edmundston, the company was awarded the contract for the Université de Moncton, the Centre Éducatif and City Hall, as well as contracts in other regions, such as the construction of a school in Grand Manan and a hydroelectric plant in Chatham.

Dr. Laporte ceased all professional activity in 1970 for health reasons and died on 25 July 1973, in Edmundston.

== Artwork ==
=== Works and style ===
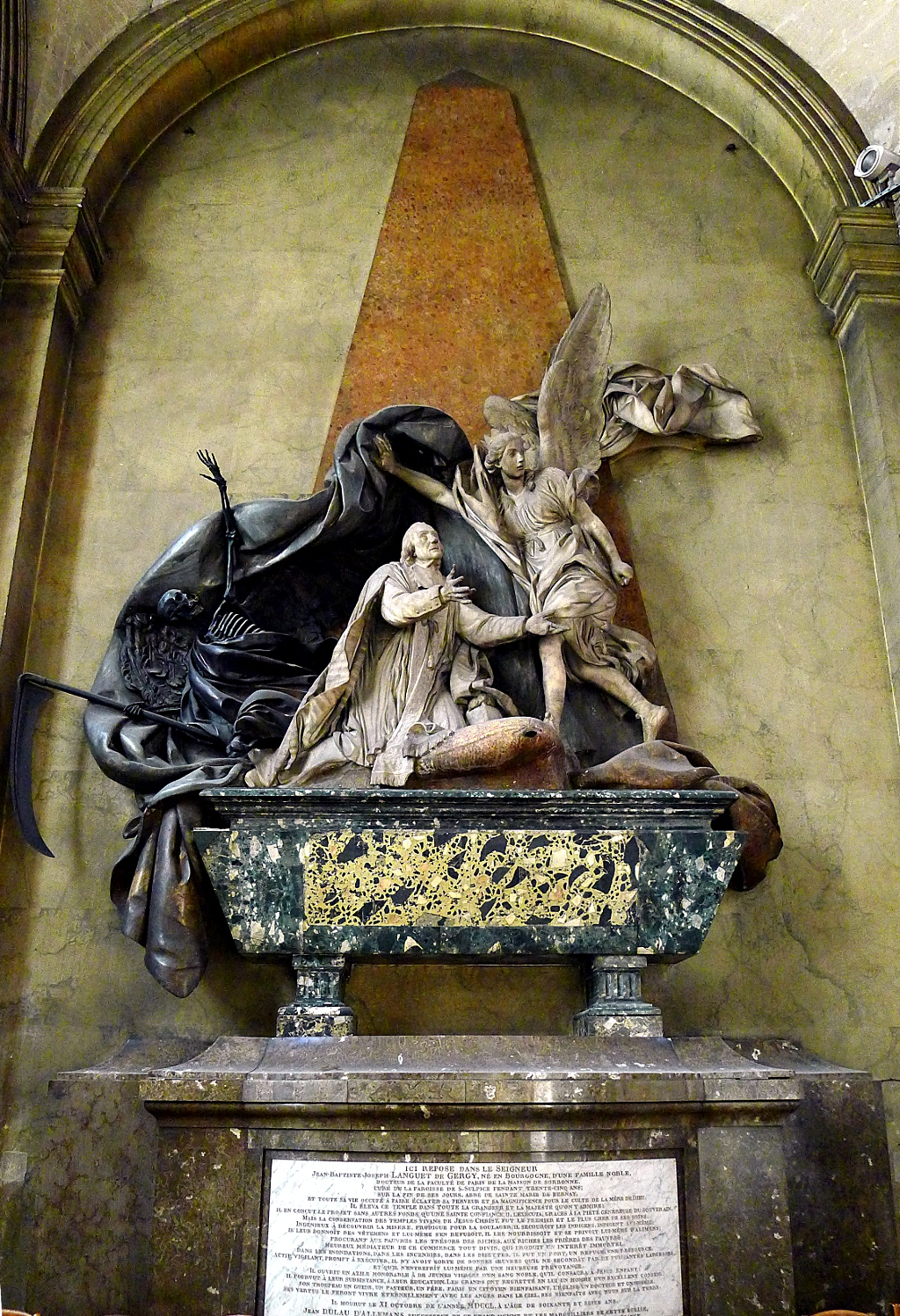
Paul Carmel Laporte drew inspiration from this tomb by Michelangelo Slodtz for Courage et dévouement, one of his major works.

In addition to being a doctor and businessman, Laporte had a passion for the arts. He learned copperplate drawing, woodcarving, painting, taxidermy, and photography. Although he considered his art a hobby, he did sell some sculptures.

Laporte's approach to form and materials was experimental. He excelled in the representation of relief, as exemplified by the pulpit in Edmundston's Anglican Church. Belonging to a generation marked by the theses of Sigmund Freud, his medical career convinced him of the psychological value of the manual arts. In terms of technical requirements, he compared woodcarving to playing the piano. What the imagination has conceived must, in his view, "induce an emotion in the soul" of the viewer, but "the art of conception is not equally attuned to all". Laporte believed that drawing came first, and that all inspiration came from nature.

In 1909, he attended the first surgery at the Saint-Basile hospital and reproduced the scene in a wood sculpture that he displayed in his office. In 1947, he created the coat of arms for the Republic of Madawaska, at a time when the region's identity was still developing. At the end of the World War II, he created a monumental work entitled Courage et dévouement, which won him an award in Atlantic City in 1947. Possibly a monument to the dead, the work depicts Death beneath the crest of a tsunami, as soldiers march over corpses. The sculpture is reminiscent of Michelangelo Slodtz's Tombeau de Jean-Joseph Languet de Gergy (1757), in the church of Saint-Sulpice in Paris. He also designed the coat of arms of the New Brunswick Society of Physicians and the pulpit of the Cathedral of the Immaculate Conception in Edmundston. Several of Laporte's works are on display at the Madawaska Historical Museum.

=== Teaching ===
Laporte set up a workshop in his basement. From 1933 onwards, he taught woodcarving and drawing three times a week on a voluntary basis (children, teenagers, and adults), with his best students receiving tools and private lessons. The first of his students to attract attention was Albert Nadeau. In 1944, he discovered the talent of young Claude Roussel, who presented him with a file-carved wooden trout. Other pupils included painter Claude Picard and sculptor Sister Marie-Hélène Allain.

An inventor and do-it-yourselfer, Paul Carmel created a solid, compact piece of furniture, incorporating a workbench, a drawing table, a toolbox, and an armchair to facilitate the work of sculptors and painters. He organized exhibitions to promote his students and published a manual on learning to sculpt. In 1951, when Claude Roussel entered the École des beaux-arts de Montréal, Laporte and Walter Clarke of Fraser Company organized a fundraising event to help finance his studies.

=== Heritage ===
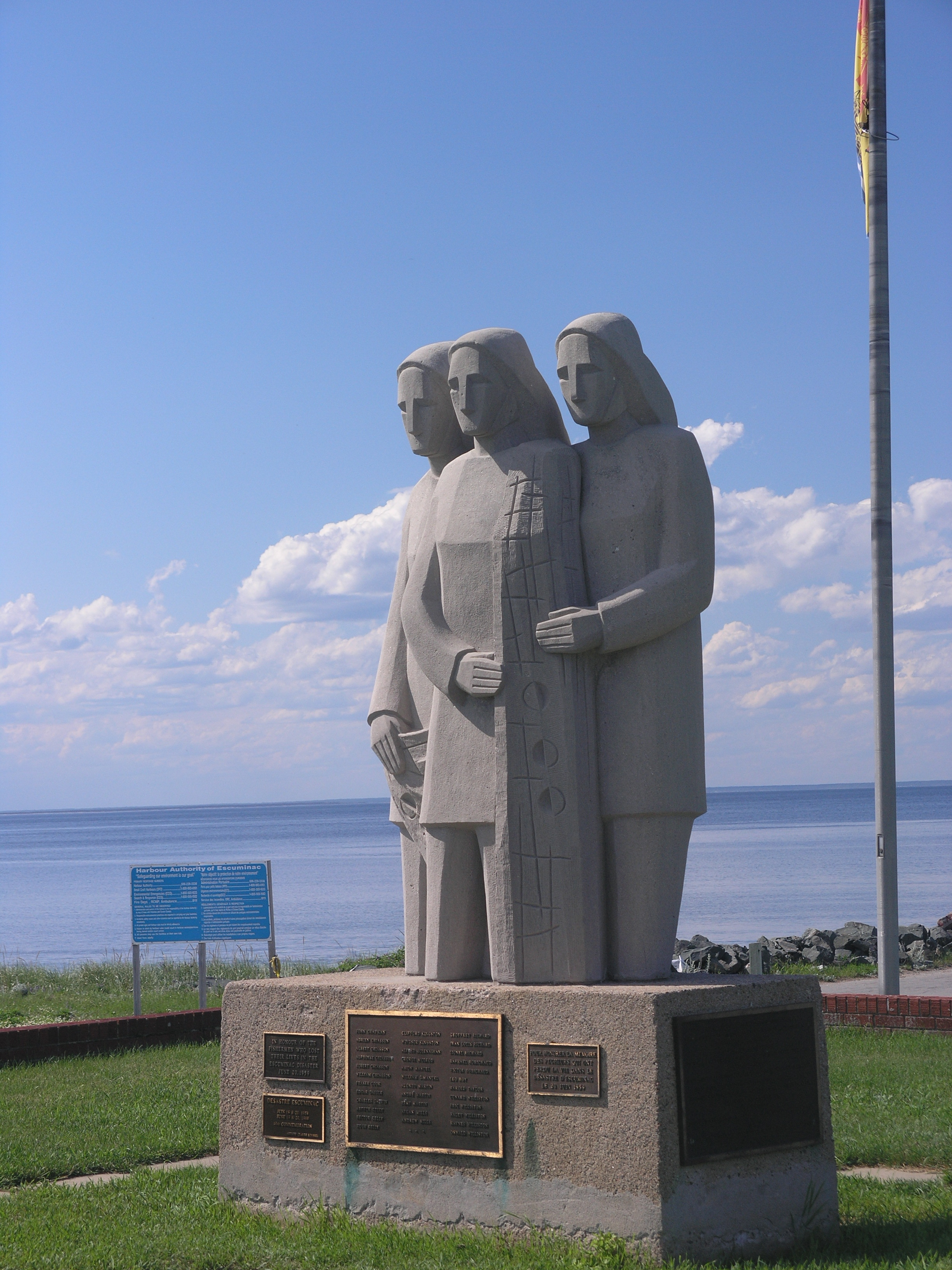
Monument du Désastre d'Escuminac, Claude Roussel (1969)

Curator Patrick Condon Laurette describes Laporte as both a "failed" sculptor and a "creator and experimenter". His former student Claude Picard says he "was an excellent surgeon, and an art teacher of incredible judgment, very judicious in his criticism [...] with a highly developed sense of humor who knew how to convey his passion for the arts". According to curator Luc Charette, his influence has yet to be recognized.

Laporte's school reflects the flowering of popular art in North America following the Great Depression. What's more, while the arts are highly developed in Madawaska today, the art scene was almost nonexistent in the 18th and 19th centuries. Its school therefore played a major role in the development of local culture. Madawaska also played a leading role in the development of the Acadian art scene with the founding of Collège Maillet de Saint-Basile in 1949. Until the 1960s, painting and sculpture in Acadia remained mainly the work of church decorators, most of whom were self-taught or trained outside the province. In 1963, his former student Claude Roussel set up the Visual Arts Department at the Université de Moncton, enabling structured education in both art forms.

The works of Laporte's students are prominently displayed in Madawaska and the rest of Acadia. Claude Picard is nationally renowned and continues his career in Edmundston, where he is one of the few artists able to make a living from his art. Marie-Hélène Allain's sculptures adorn many of the province's public buildings. Albert Nadeau made his career in Saint-Jean-Port-Joli, Quebec, and is considered Canada's finest woodcarver. Claude Roussel has a studio in Cap-Pelé, in the southeast of the province, where he has played a key role in contemporary Acadian culture.

Some of Laporte's work inspired his students, and the influence of his teaching is still evident in the style of local artists. Claude Roussel, for example, drew inspiration from the sculpture of the first surgery in Saint-Basile for Retour à la santé (1948). Courage et dévouement served as a model for Quebec sculptor Denis Charette as well as for Roussel, as can be seen in his Monument du Désastre d'Escuminac (Escuminac Disaster Monument). In 1985, Claude Picard created the fresco La vie au Madawaska 1785–1985, on display in the Edmundston city council chambers, depicting important personalities and events in the region. Laporte appears in the painting, teaching his students from an armchair of his own invention.

== Other projects ==
After many representations to the government, his Clair-Fort Kent Bridge project came to fruition in 1929. Two others of his projects came to fruition, the Natural History Museum in Grand Manan, and the Laporte Museum, now the Madawaska Historical Museum, in 1940 at Université de Moncton. Laporte, president of the Madawaska-Edmundston Rotary Club, wanted to build a museum in Edmundston in the shape of a cogwheel, the club's emblem, but this project had to be abandoned. Interested in radio, he founded CJEM-FM, the oldest French radio station in Atlantic Canada. in 1944 with MP Joseph-Gaspard Boucher and judge Joseph-Enoïl Michaud. He was also the founder of the Federation of Canadian Sculptors in 1951, and of the Le Burin club for woodcarvers in 1967. Laporte also directed the Edmundston fanfare, founded by his brother Sydney in 1914, for a few months.

== Awards ==
- 1967: Order of Canada
- 1968: Doctor of Letters, honoris causa, Université de Moncton
- Doctor of Arts, honoris causa, Université Saint-Louis
- Commander in Justice of the Sovereign Order of Saint John of Jerusalem
- Member of the Order of the British Empire (MBE)

== See also ==
- Clair–Fort Kent Bridge
- CJEM-FM

== Bibliography ==
- L'Évangéline (in French). 1925.
- L'aîné des médecins au Nouveau-Brunswick (in French). Le Madawaska. 1973.
- Roussel, Brigitte; Roussel, Claude (1982). L'Acadie des Maritimes (in French). Chaire d'études acadiennes, Université de Moncton. ISBN 0916910210.
- Condon, Patrick (1993). "Aspects historiques de l'art en Acadie". L'Acadie des Maritimes (in French). Chaire d'études acadiennes, Université de Moncton.
- Shevlin, Eugène (1954). The Doctor Thought He Had Retired. Columbia.
