= Clair–Fort Kent Bridge =

Bridge between Maine, US and New Brunswick, Canada

Clair – Fort Kent Bridge
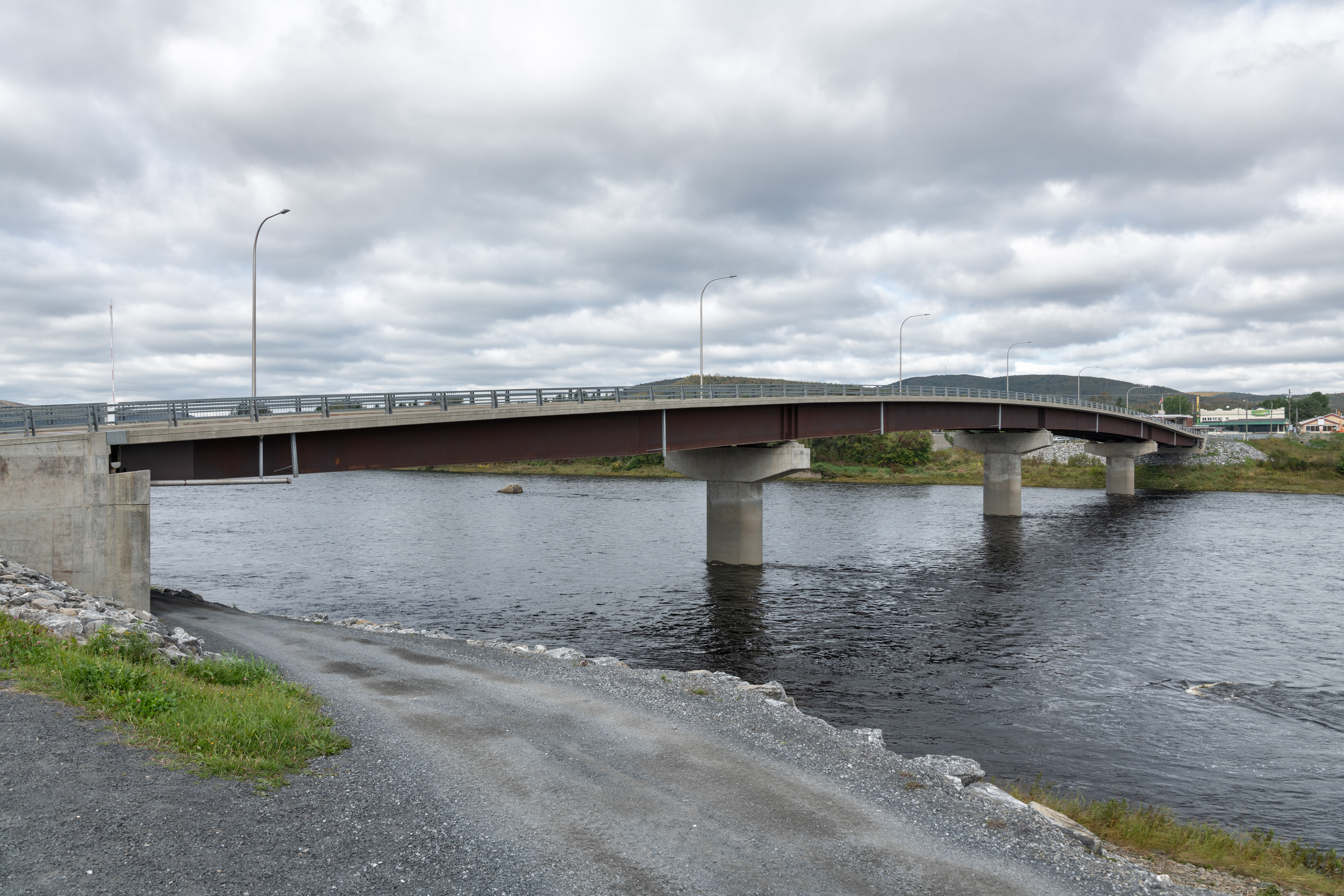
- Clair – Fort Kent Bridge September 25, 2023
- Coordinates: 47°14′57.3″N 68°36′13.6″W
- Carries: Connects US 1 / SR 161 in the United States and Route 205 / Route 161 in Canada.
- Crosses: Saint John River
- Locale: Canada–United States border
- Owner: MaineDOT
- Maintained by: MaineDOT
- ID number: 2398
- Website: www.cbp.gov/contact/ports/fort-kent-maine-0110

Characteristics
- Design: Stringer/Multi-beam or Girder
- Material: Steel
- Total length: 213.3 ft longest span
- Width: 31 ft
- No. of spans: 4

History
- Opened: 2014
- Replaces: steel-truss bridge

Statistics
- Daily traffic: 739 (2025)

Location
- Interactive map of Clair – Fort Kent Bridge

The Clair–Fort Kent Bridge is a 4-span multi-girder steel bridge crossing the Saint John River between Clair, New Brunswick, Canada, and Fort Kent, Maine, United States.

The bridge handles an annual average of 739 vehicles per day and forms a border crossing on the International Boundary. It connects with Route 205 in New Brunswick and Route 161 and U.S. Route 1 (US 1) in Maine, also forming the northern terminus of US 1.

Since it is an international bridge, the Canadian portion of the structure is the responsibility of the Province of New Brunswick, while the American portion is operated by the State of Maine.

The current bridge was opened in July of 2014 and replaced an older steel-truss bridge.

== Steel Truss Bridge 1930-2014 ==
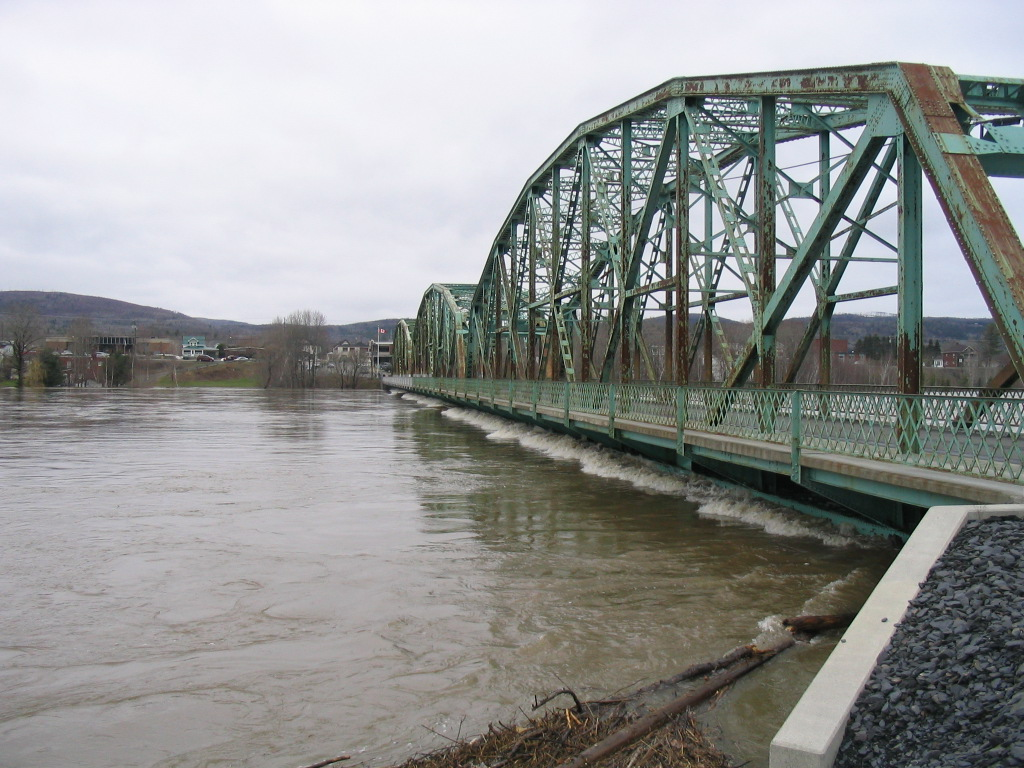
The original steel-truss bridge

The original bridge was built in 1929–30 as a replacement for an existing cable ferry and a cable suspension footbridge which first opened in 1905. The bridge had three steel through-truss spans of 73.15 m (240.0 ft) each for a total length of 221.93 m (728.1 ft). In 1995, the first pier from the New Brunswick abutment had major repairs done. In 1997, the steel members under the deck in the first 1.5 spans from the New Brunswick end were sandblasted, and then painted with a primer of inorganic zinc. In the same year, the downstream exterior stringers in these 1.5 spans were replaced. In 1998, the downstream concrete curb in the first 1.5 spans from the New Brunswick end was replaced. In 2000, the New Brunswick end concrete abutment underwent a major restoration. In 2009, officials from Canada and the United States determined that the bridge was structurally and functionally obsolete. In January 2011, the Maine Department of Transportation imposed a 2.7-ton weight restriction on the bridge after advanced deterioration of the bridge on Maine's side was discovered during a routine inspection. On January 28, 2011, officials from New Brunswick and Maine announced plans to build a new bridge and demolish the existing structure. Construction began on the new bridge in 2012 and the estimated completion date was June 30, 2014. It was expected to cost $13.9 million.

The new bridge opened on July 31, 2014. Demolition of the old bridge was underway by September 29, 2014.

== Border crossing ==
The US built a two-story wooden colonial border station with a canopy in 1930. It was replaced with a brick border station around 1974. Canada built a wooden hip-roofed border stations with both inbound and outbound canopies in 1930. It was replaced around 1955 with a two-story brick border station that is still in use today.

The crossing is open 24 hours a day. About 2,000 cars use it per day.

== See also ==
- Paul Carmel Laporte
- List of international bridges in North America
