= Wade, Maine =

Town in Maine, United States

- Town
- Location of Wade, Maine
- Coordinates: 46°45′53″N 68°14′25″W
- Country: United States
- State: Maine
- County: Aroostook
- Village: North Wade

Area
  - Total: 36.37 sq mi (94.20 km^{2})
  - Land: 36.11 sq mi (93.52 km^{2})
  - Water: 0.26 sq mi (0.67 km^{2})
- Elevation: 791 ft (241 m)

Population (2020)
  - Total: 229
  - Density: 6.2/sq mi (2.4/km^{2})
- Time zone: UTC-5 (Eastern (EST))
  - Summer (DST): UTC-4 (EDT)
- ZIP Code: 04786
- Area code: 207
- FIPS code: 23-79270
- GNIS feature ID: 582783

Wade is a town in Aroostook County, Maine, United States. The population was 229 at the 2020 census.

== Education ==
Wade is a part of Maine School Administrative District 45, which includes Washburn, Wade and Perham.

== Etymology ==
At present, the origin of the name is an enigma, but the community was formerly known as "Dunntown".

== Geography ==
According to the United States Census Bureau, the town has a total area of 36.37 square miles (94.20 km^{2}), of which 36.11 square miles (93.52 km^{2}) is land and 0.26 square miles (0.67 km^{2}) is water.

== Demographics ==
Historical population
Census	Pop.	Note	%±
1870	76		—
1880	131		72.4%
1890	158		20.6%
1900	271		71.5%
1910	318		17.3%
1920	385		21.1%
1930	384		−0.3%
1940	335		−12.8%
1950	343		2.4%
1960	220		−35.9%
1970	255		15.9%
1980	285		11.8%
1990	243		−14.7%
2000	250		2.9%
2010	283		13.2%
2020	229		−19.1%
U.S. Decennial Census

=== 2010 census ===
As of the census of 2010, there were 283 people, 112 households, and 76 families living in the town. The population density was 7.8 inhabitants per square mile (3.0/km^{2}). There were 129 housing units at an average density of 3.6 per square mile (1.4/km^{2}). The racial makeup of the town was 97.9% White, 1.4% Asian, 0.4% from other races, and 0.4% from two or more races. Hispanic or Latino of any race were 1.4% of the population.

There were 112 households, of which 25.0% had children under the age of 18 living with them, 60.7% were married couples living together, 4.5% had a female householder with no husband present, 2.7% had a male householder with no wife present, and 32.1% were non-families. 25.0% of all households were made up of individuals, and 13.4% had someone living alone who was 65 years of age or older. The average household size was 2.53 and the average family size was 2.97.

The median age in the town was 47.4 years. 17.7% of residents were under the age of 18; 8.8% were between the ages of 18 and 24; 20.1% were from 25 to 44; 37.2% were from 45 to 64; and 16.3% were 65 years of age or older. The gender makeup of the town was 53.4% male and 46.6% female.

=== 2000 census ===
As of the census of 2000, there were 250 people, 97 households, and 68 families living in the town. The population density was 6.9 people per square mile (2.7/km^{2}). There were 118 housing units at an average density of 3.3 per square mile (1.3/km^{2}). The racial makeup of the town was 99.20% White, 0.40% African American, and 0.40% from two or more races.

There were 97 households, out of which 30.9% had children under the age of 18 living with them, 60.8% were married couples living together, 7.2% had a female householder with no husband present, and 28.9% were non-families. 21.6% of all households were made up of individuals, and 7.2% had someone living alone who was 65 years of age or older. The average household size was 2.58 and the average family size was 3.01.

In the town, the population was spread out, with 25.2% under the age of 18, 6.4% from 18 to 24, 25.2% from 25 to 44, 30.8% from 45 to 64, and 12.4% who were 65 years of age or older. The median age was 42 years. For every 100 females, there were 117.4 males. For every 100 females age 18 and over, there were 112.5 males.

The median income for a household in the town was $34,375, and the median income for a family was $38,125. Males had a median income of $31,250 versus $22,500 for females. The per capita income for the town was $14,501. About 6.2% of families and 9.6% of the population were below the poverty line, including 13.7% of those under the age of eighteen and 14.3% of those 65 or over.
