= Judy Paradis =

American politician

Member of the Maine Senate from the 2nd district
- In office 1992–1994

Personal details
- Born: January 17, 1944 (age 82) St. Agatha, Maine, U.S.
- Party: Democratic
- Profession: Teacher

Judy Ayotte Paradis (born January 17, 1944) is an American politician from Maine. From 1986 to 1994, she represented Madawaska, Maine while serving in the Maine Legislature as a member of the Maine House of Representatives (1986-1992) and the Maine Senate (1992-1994). In 1991, she won the Toll Fellowship from the National Council of State Legislatures.

In December 2011, during an event in Northern Aroostook County, Paradis told Governor Paul LePage, "You come off as a bully" during a workshop regarding large cuts to MaineCare proposed by the LePage administration.

== Personal ==
Paradis was born on January 17, 1944, in St. Agatha, Maine of French Canadian parents. Bilingual, she speaks English and Acadian French. She studied French at the University of Maine Fort Kent. She then taught French at Wisdom Middle High School in her hometown and nearby Madawaska High School. She was inducted in the Maine Women's Hall of Fame in 2005.
