= Northwest Aroostook, Maine =

- Unorganized territory
- Location of Northwest Aroostook, Maine
- Coordinates: 46°50′56″N 69°11′54″W
- Country: United States
- State: Maine
- County: Aroostook

Area
  - Total: 2,669.2 sq mi (6,913.2 km^{2})
  - Land: 2,629.4 sq mi (6,810.1 km^{2})
  - Water: 39.8 sq mi (103.2 km^{2})
- Elevation: 1,093 ft (333 m)

Population (2020)
  - Total: 12
  - Density: 0.0046/sq mi (0.0018/km^{2})
- Time zone: UTC-5 (Eastern (EST))
  - Summer (DST): UTC-4 (EDT)
- Area code: 207
- FIPS code: 23-53602
- GNIS feature ID: 582638

Northwest Aroostook is an unorganized territory in Aroostook County, Maine, United States. The population was 12 at the 2020 census.

== Geography ==
According to the United States Census Bureau, the unorganized territory has a total area of 2,669.2 square miles (6,913.2 km^{2}), of which 2,629.4 square miles (6,810.1 km^{2}) is land and 39.8 square miles (103.2 km^{2}), or 1.49%, is water.

There are 70 townships within the unorganized territory, plus part of one that is shared with Square Lake. The northernmost point of Maine, Big Twenty Township, is located in Northwest Aroostook.

== Demographics ==
Historical population
Census	Pop.	Note	%±
1980	101		—
1990	45		−55.4%
2000	27		−40.0%
2010	10		−63.0%
2020	12		20.0%
U.S. Decennial Census

As of the 2000 census, there were 27 people, 12 households, and 5 families living in the unorganized territory. The population density was 0.0 inhabitants per square mile (0/km^{2}). There were 313 housing units at an average density of 0.1 per square mile (0.039/km^{2}). The racial makeup was 96.30% White and 3.70% Black or African American. Hispanics or Latinos of any race were 3.70% of the population.

There were 12 households, of which 16.7% had children under the age of 18 living with them, 41.7% were married couples living together, and 58.3% were non-families. In the unorganized territory, 50.0% of all households were made up of individuals, and 16.7% had someone living alone who was 65 years of age or older. The average household size was 1.92, and the average family size was 3.00.

In the unorganized territory, 7.4% of the population were under the age of 18, 40.7% were 25 to 44, 14.8% were 45 to 64, and 37.0% were 65 or older. The median age was 46 years. For every female, there were 2.000 males. For every female age 18 and over, there were 2.125 males.

The median income for a household in the unorganized territory was $22,250, and the median income for a family was $21,750. Males had a median income of $13,750, versus $27,083 for females. The per capita income for the unorganized territory was $16,872. None of the population or the families was below the poverty line.
