= Mount Linn =

Mountain in the state of California

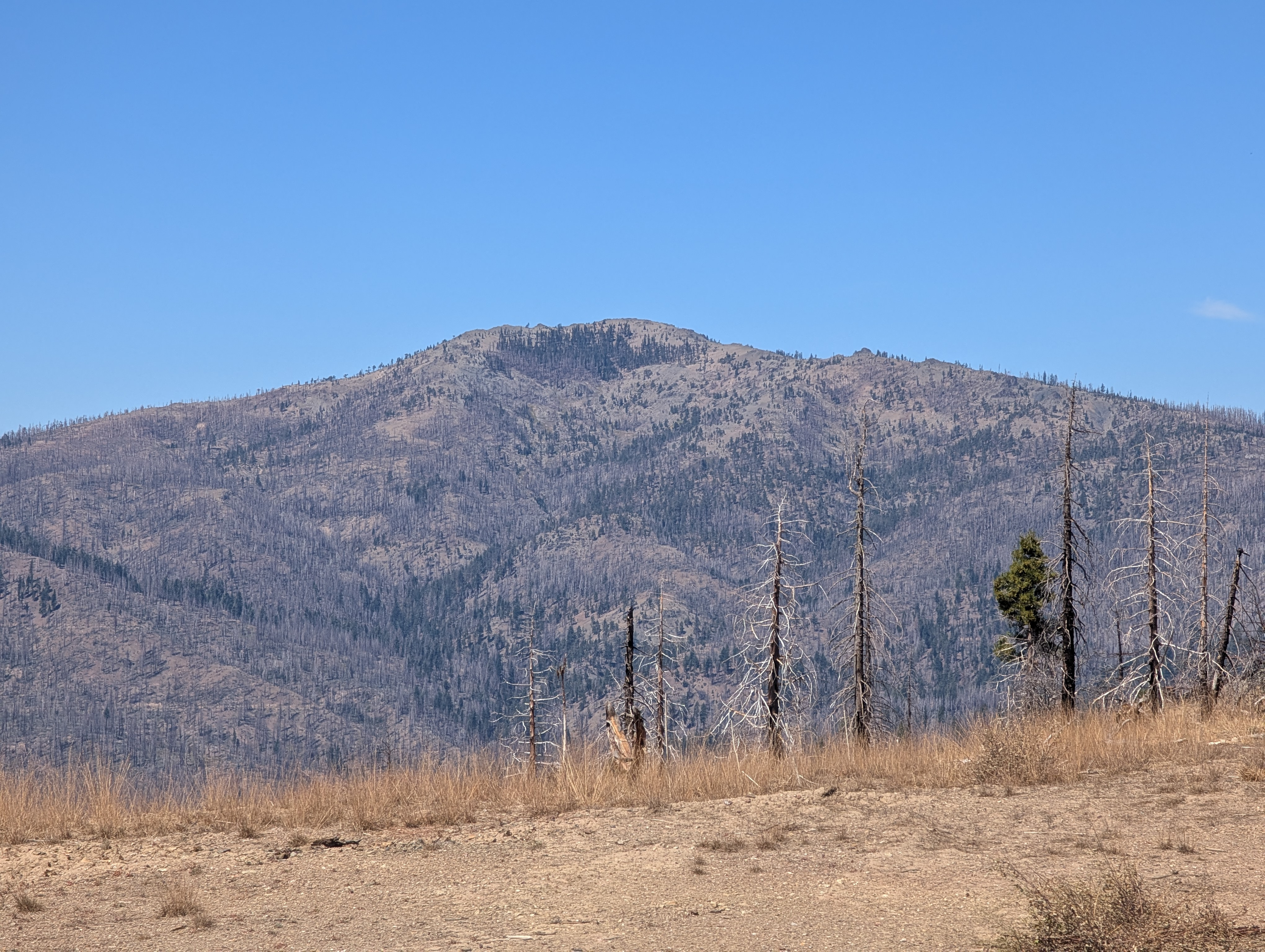
- Mount Linn viewed from the Southeast

Highest point
- Elevation: 8,098 ft (2,468 m) NAVD 88
- Prominence: 4,814 ft (1,467 m)
- Coordinates: 40°02′13″N 122°51′18″W

Geography
- Location: Yolla Bolly-Middle Eel Wilderness, Tehama County, California, U.S.
- Parent range: Pacific Coast Ranges: siblings California Coast Ranges System, Klamath Mountains, Yolla Bolly Mountains
- Topo map: USGS South Yolla Bolla Mountains

Mount Linn, at 8,098 feet (2,468 m), is the easternmost summit of South Yolla Bolly Mountain, and is located in the Yolla Bolly Mountains of the Northern Coast Ranges and sibling Klamath Mountains System, in Tehama County, northwestern California. Mt. Linn is the highest peak in the northern California Coast Ranges south of the Trinity Alps and, along with the highest peaks of the Trinity Alps, the tallest coastal range peak within the coterminous forty-eight states. Mt. Linn is the third most prominent peak in the northern Pacific Coast Ranges behind Mt. Eddy and Caesar Peaks in the Trinity Alps and Mt. Olympus of Washington's Olympic Mountains.

Mt. Linn is protected within the Yolla Bolly-Middle Eel Wilderness, in the Shasta-Trinity National Forest section.

== Geography ==
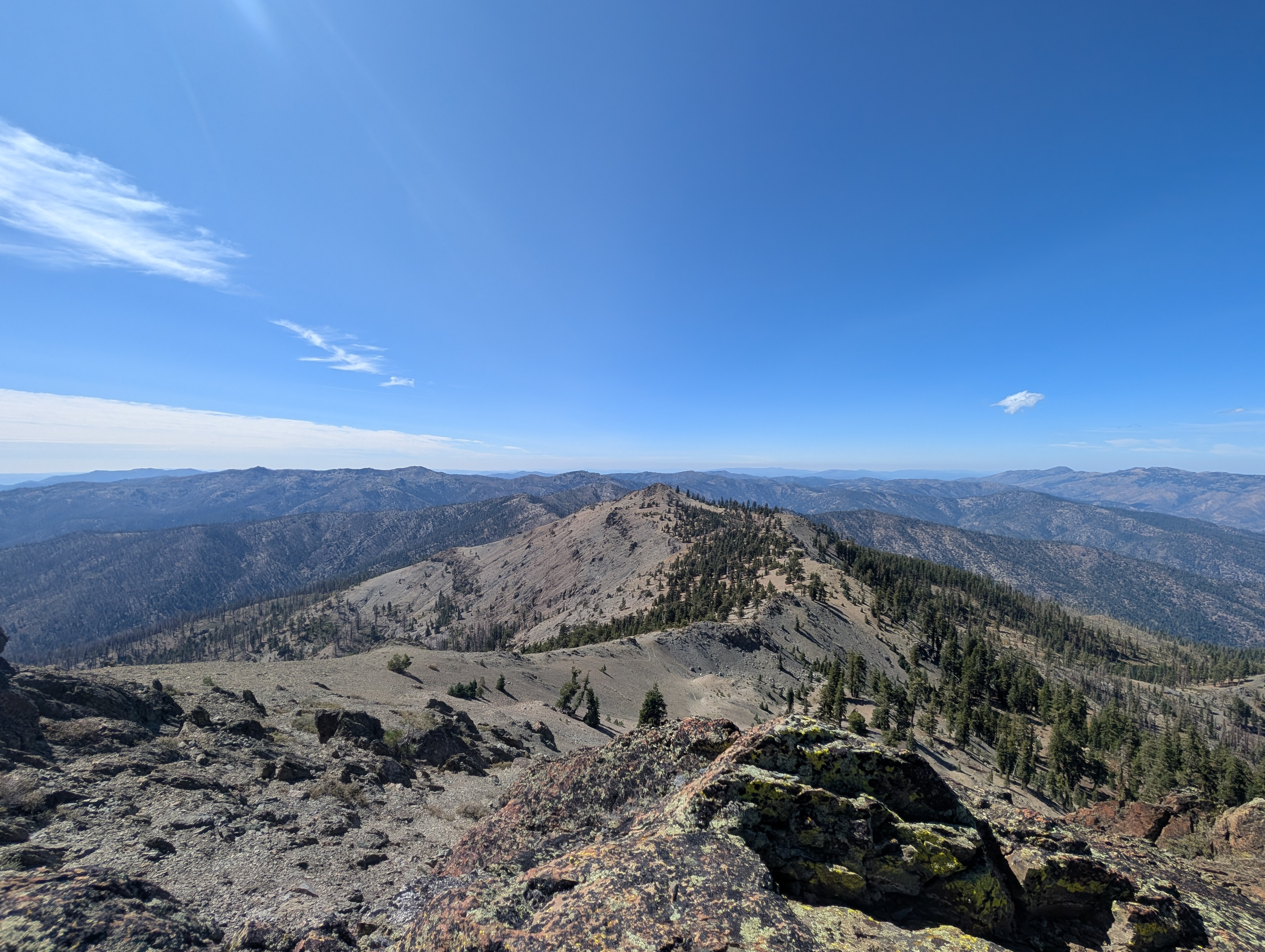
Looking westward along South Yolla Bolly from Mt. Linn

The summit of Mount Linn is the highest point in the Northern California Coast Ranges segment of the Coastal Crest, south of the Trinity Alps range's high peaks, also in the Klamath Mountains System. The elevation of the mountain ensures it receives heavy winter snowfall and it has low average annual temperature near the summit.

A tarn named Square Lake is located in a cirque on Mount Linn's north slope. The cirque was carved by glaciers during the Ice Age.

The mountain was named by John C. Frémont in honor of Lewis F. Linn, a senator from Missouri, who played an important role in the acquisition of the Oregon Territory.

== See also ==
- Flora of the Klamath Mountains
