= New Brunswick Route 190 =

Highway in New Brunswick, Canada

Route 190

Route information
- Maintained by New Brunswick Department of Transportation
- Length: 6.42 km (3.99 mi)
- Existed: 2001–present

Major junctions
- West end: SR 161 at the U.S. border near Carlingford
- Route 2 (TCH) near Perth-Andover
- East end: Route 130 in Southern Victoria

Location
- Country: Canada
- Province: New Brunswick
- Major cities: Southern Victoria

Highway system
- Provincial highways in New Brunswick; Former routes
| ← Route 180 | → Route 205 |

Route 190 is a 6 km (3.7 mi)-long east–west secondary highway in western New Brunswick, Canada.

The route's western terminus is at the Canada–United States border between Carlingford, New Brunswick and Fort Fairfield, Maine. Route 190 travels east to the town of Southern Victoria where it ends at Route 130. In Southern Victoria, the route is called Fort Road.

== History ==
The road from Andover to the border near Fort Fairfield, Maine was originally designated as Route 7. It was renumbered as Route 19 in 1965 and Route 190 in 1984.

A high-speed connector road between the Trans-Canada Highway and the bridge in Southern Victoria was constructed as part of upgrades to the Trans Canada Highway in 2003. It became part of Route 109, which was extended from across the river, while Route 190 was shortened.

== See also ==
- List of New Brunswick provincial highways
