= Fish River chain of lakes =

Group of lakes in Aroostook County, Maine, United States

Long Lake
- Location within Maine
- Location: Aroostook County, Maine
- Coordinates: 47°12′N 68°15′W
- Primary inflows: Little River
- Max. length: 10.3 mi (16.6 km)
- Surface area: 6,849 acres (2,772 ha)
- Max. depth: 163 feet (50 m)
- Water volume: 329,456 acre⋅ft (406,378,000 m^{3})
- Surface elevation: 581 ft (177 m)

Mud Lake
- Location within Maine
- Location: Aroostook County
- Coordinates: 47°09′N 68°17′W
- Max. length: 2.4 mi (3.9 km)
- Surface area: 1,002 acres (405 ha)
- Max. depth: 20 feet (6.1 m)
- Water volume: 10,138 acre⋅ft (12,505,000 m^{3})
- Surface elevation: 581 ft (177 m)

Cross Lake
- Location within Maine
- Location: Aroostook County
- Coordinates: 47°07′N 68°20′W
- Max. length: 5.6 mi (9.0 km)
- Surface area: 2,470 acres (1,000 ha)
- Max. depth: 46 ft (14 m)
- Water volume: 52,267 acre⋅ft (64,470,000 m^{3})
- Surface elevation: 578 ft (176 m)

Square Lake
- Location within Maine
- Location: Aroostook County
- Coordinates: 47°03′N 68°22′W
- Max. length: 7.7 mi (12.4 km)
- Max. width: 2.2 mi (3.5 km)
- Surface area: 8,090 acres (3,270 ha)
- Max. depth: 122 ft (37 m)
- Water volume: 277,829 acre⋅ft (342,697,000 m^{3})
- Surface elevation: 577 ft (176 m)

Eagle Lake
- Location within Maine
- Location: Aroostook County
- Coordinates: 47°03′N 68°30′W
- Primary outflows: Fish River
- Max. length: 15 mi (24 km)
- Surface area: 5,601 acres (2,267 ha)
- Max. depth: 136 ft (41 m)
- Water volume: 249,702 acre⋅ft (308,003,000 m^{3})
- Surface elevation: 574 ft (175 m)

The Fish River chain of lakes is a series of five lakes in the North Maine Woods region of northern Maine, in a tributary stream to the Fish River. The lakes are an important northern Maine recreation area providing habitat for wildlife including rainbow smelt, brook trout, lake trout, and land-locked Atlantic salmon.

== Long Lake ==
Long Lake extends southward from Saint Agatha into Maine township 17 ranges 3 and 4. Tributaries Brishlotte Brook, Ouellette Brook, and Little River flow into the north end of the lake. Paulette Brook flows into the east side of the lake; Mud Brook flows into the southeast end of the lake; and McLean Brook, Bard Brook, and Pelletier Brook flow into the southwest arm of the lake. The lake overflows from the end of the southwest arm through the Long Lake Thoroughfare into Mud Lake approximately 500 metres (550 yd) away. There are two boat launch areas, a picnic area, and numerous residences and camps where Maine State Route 162 follows the west shore of the lake. Long Lake is the deepest lake of the chain, and provides good habitat for brook trout, rainbow smelt, and land-locked salmon.

== Mud Lake ==
Long Lake Thoroughfare discharges into the east end of Mud Lake in Maine township 17, range 4; and the west end of Mud Lake in township 17, range 5, discharges through Cross Lake Thoroughfare into Cross Lake approximately 1.5 miles (2.4 km) away. Numerous residences and camps line the north shore of Mud Lake along Maine State Route 162. Mud Lake is the smallest and shallowest lake of the chain, and provides habitat for longnose sucker, hornpout, and yellow perch.

== Cross Lake ==
Mud Lake discharges into the east side of Cross Lake in Maine township 17, range 5; and the south end of Cross Lake in township 16, range 5, overflows through Square Lake Thoroughfare into Square Lake approximately 1 kilometre (1,100 yd) away. There are residences and camps along the north end and eastern shore of Cross Lake where Maine State Route 161 follows the northeast shore of the lake; and there is a public boat launch and picnic area on the southeast shore. The remaining shoreline of this shallow lake is boggy and undeveloped. Tributaries Dickey Brook and Daigle Brook enter the north end of the lake and Black Brook enter the south end providing spawning and nursery habitat for brook trout, rainbow smelt, and land-locked salmon.

== Square Lake ==
Cross Lake discharges into the east side of Square Lake, and the north end of Square Lake overflows 3.5 miles (5.6 km) through Eagle Lake Thoroughfare into the eastern arm of Eagle Lake. Square Lake is the largest lake of the chain and is almost entirely within Maine township 16, range 5. Tributaries Dimock Brook and California Brook flowing into the north end of the lake from township 17, range 5, and Goddard Brook flowing into the south end from township 15, range 5, provide good spawning and nursery habitat for brook trout, rainbow smelt, and land-locked salmon.

== Eagle Lake ==
Eagle Lake overflows into the Fish River in the southeast corner of Wallagrass 13 miles (21 km) upstream of the confluence with the Saint John River. From the outlet, the lake extends southward through the eastern part of the town of Eagle Lake and forms a "L" extending eastward through township 16, range 6, into township 16, range 5. Fish River enters Eagle Lake at the bend in the "L". The chain of lakes tributary to the Fish River enters Eagle Lake via the Eagle Lake Thoroughfare from Square Lake in township 16, range 5. Smaller tributaries to Eagle Lake include Clark Brook, Gilmore Brook, Brown Brook, Devoe Brook, and Pond Brook from the town of Eagle Lake, and Alec Brook, Miller Brook, and Last Brook from township 16. The Bangor and Aroostook Railroad follows the west shore of Eagle Lake through the town of Eagle Lake and then follows the Fish River into Fort Kent. Eagle Lake provides good habitat for rainbow smelt, brook trout, lake trout, and land-locked salmon. The entire eastern arm of Eagle Lake is within the 23,000-acre (9,300 ha) reserve of public land available for ATV riding, birding, camping, cross-country skiing, fishing, hiking, hunting, snowmobiling, snowshoeing, and swimming.
