= Crouseville, Maine =

- Unincorporated village
- Location within the state of Maine
- Coordinates: 46°45′18″N 68°05′47″W
- Country: United States
- State: Maine
- County: Aroostook
- Town: Washburn
- Elevation: 453 ft (138 m)
- Time zone: UTC-5 (Eastern (EST))
  - Summer (DST): UTC-4 (EDT)
- ZIP code: 04738
- GNIS feature ID: 564586

Crouseville is an unincorporated village located within the town of Washburn in Aroostook County, Maine, United States.

Crouseville, Maine, c. 1922

== History ==
In 1800 the future Crouseville, Maine, did not have any particular name. In 1826 it was first surveyed by Joseph Norris, whereupon it became known only as a part of Township 13, Range 3.

Crouseville General Store, c. 1920

The early settlers living along the Aroostook River could not be certain if they lived in New Brunswick, a North American British Colony, or the United States. In 1839, the United States formed Aroostook County. This was an effort by the United States to lay claim to the area. In 1842, the Webster-Ashburton Treaty firmly established the area as United States territory, yet some townships in Maine were administratively part of Massachusetts, the mother state.

Salmon Brook Township (Township 13, Range 3), organized as the Plantation of Salmon Brook in the winter of 1844-1845, was one of the townships that belonged to Massachusetts, until circa 1852. During this time, the Crouseville area was called East Salmon Brook.

In 1850, pioneers Gould and Hepzibah (Clark) Crouse emigrated from the British Colony of New Brunswick. They, along with the families of their children, Jeremiah, Abraham, William, Esther, Ann, Jesse, Gould, Jr. and Joshua, homesteaded much of the Crouseville area.

The nearby village of Salmon Brook incorporated into the city of Washburn in 1861 and East Salmon Brook thereafter was commonly referred to as East Washburn. Finally, in 1897, the community was formally named Crouseville, after pioneers Gould and Hepzibah Crouse and their descendants.

== Cemeteries ==
Crouseville Pioneer Cemetery

- First known burial, Duncan Christie, drowned at Rum Rapids (Crouseville) December 18, 1857.
- First known burial, Marshall Crouse (b. March 29, 1875 - d. January 9, 1876).

Hillside Grove Cemetery

== Geography ==
Crouseville is situated next to the Aroostook River and three of its permanent river islands; Crouse Island, Churchill Island and Bull Island. Rum Rapids flow near Churchill Island.

=== Climate ===
This climatic region is typified by large seasonal temperature differences, with warm to hot (and often humid) summers and cold (sometimes severely cold) winters. According to the Köppen Climate Classification system, Crouseville has a humid continental climate, abbreviated "Dfb" on climate maps.

== Recreation ==
Aroostook County’s 1600-mile snowmobile trail system, Northeast Snowmobile Trail (NEST), runs through the heart of Crouseville and interconnects with the International Snowmobile Trail System linking Maine, New Hampshire, Vermont, and the Province of Quebec.

Nearby downhill and cross-country skiing facilities are available.

== Education ==
Crouseville is located in Maine School Administrative District 45. The University of Maine at Presque Isle and Northern Maine Community College are both located six miles to the east in Presque Isle, Maine.

== See also ==
Northern Maine Regional Airport at Presque Isle, the airport (PQI) that serves Crouseville.
