= Square Lake (Tehama County, California) =

Lake in the state of California, United States

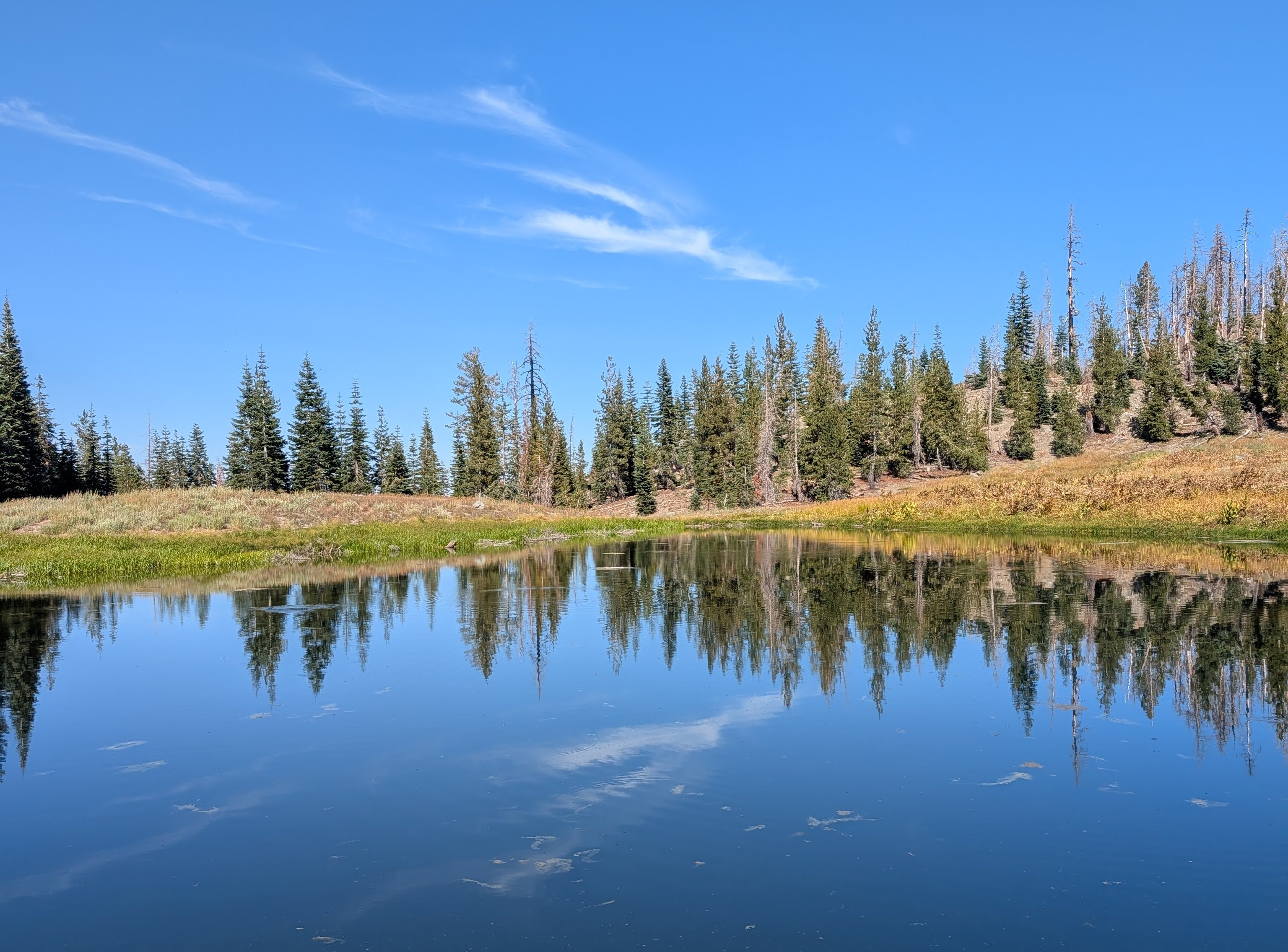
- Square Lake in September 2025

- Location within California Location within the United States
- Location: Tehama County, California, United States
- Coordinates: 40°02′32″N 122°51′01″W
- Basin countries: United States
- Surface elevation: 7,021 ft (2,140 m)

Square Lake is a tarn located in a cirque north of Mount Linn in the northern California Coast Ranges, in Tehama County, California.

Square Lake lies at an elevation of about 7,021 feet (2,140 m). Like its name states, the lake has straight shorelines that make the shape of the lake resemble a square.

== See also ==
- List of lakes in California
