= St. Agatha, Maine =

Town in Maine, United States

Saint Agatha Sainte-Agathe
- Town
- Saint Agatha
- Location of St. Agatha, Maine
- Coordinates: 47°14′05″N 68°21′22″W
- Country: United States
- State: Maine
- County: Aroostook

Area
  - Total: 35.03 sq mi (90.73 km^{2})
  - Land: 29.51 sq mi (76.43 km^{2})
  - Water: 5.52 sq mi (14.30 km^{2})
- Elevation: 850 ft (260 m)

Population (2020)
  - Total: 730
  - Density: 25/sq mi (9.6/km^{2})
- Time zone: UTC-5 (Eastern (EST))
  - Summer (DST): UTC-4 (EDT)
- ZIP code: 04772
- Area code: 207
- FIPS code: 23-64780
- GNIS feature ID: 582706
- Website: www.stagatha.com

St. Agatha or Saint Agatha (French: Sainte-Agathe) is a town in Aroostook County, Maine, United States. The population was 730 at the 2020 census.

According to the most recent American Community Survey data, up to 44.7% of the population age 5 and older speak French at home.

== Geography ==
According to the United States Census Bureau, the town has a total area of 35.03 square miles (90.73 km^{2}), of which 29.51 square miles (76.43 km^{2}) is land and 5.52 square miles (14.30 km^{2}) is water.

== Demographics ==
Historical population
Census	Pop.	Note	%±
1900	1,396		—
1910	1,533		9.8%
1920	1,669		8.9%
1930	1,596		−4.4%
1940	1,874		17.4%
1950	1,512		−19.3%
1960	1,137		−24.8%
1970	868		−23.7%
1980	1,035		19.2%
1990	919		−11.2%
2000	802		−12.7%
2010	747		−6.9%
2020	730		−2.3%
U.S. Decennial Census

=== 2010 census ===
As of the census of 2010, there were 747 people, 357 households, and 215 families living in the town. The population density was 25.3 inhabitants per square mile (9.8/km^{2}). There were 497 housing units at an average density of 16.8 per square mile (6.5/km^{2}). The racial makeup of the town was 99.7% White and 0.2% from two or more races. Hispanic or Latino of any race were 0.1% of the population.

There were 357 households, of which 18.8% had children under the age of 18 living with them, 50.7% were married couples living together, 6.4% had a female householder with no husband present, 3.1% had a male householder with no wife present, and 39.8% were non-families. 35.3% of all households were made up of individuals, and 16.2% had someone living alone who was 65 years of age or older. The average household size was 2.09 and the average family size was 2.67.

The median age in the town was 51.6 years. 17.4% of residents were under the age of 18; 4% were between the ages of 18 and 24; 20.4% were from 25 to 44; 36.7% were from 45 to 64; and 21.4% were 65 years of age or older. The gender makeup of the town was 51.4% male and 48.6% female.

=== 2000 census ===
Languages (2000)	Percent
Spoke French at home	80.62%
Spoke English at home	19.38%

As of the census of 2000, there were 802 people, 350 households, and 235 families living in the town. The population density was 27.2 inhabitants per square mile (10.5/km^{2}). There were 460 housing units at an average density of 15.6 per square mile (6.0/km^{2}). The racial makeup of the town was 99.63% White, 0.12% Native American, 0.12% Pacific Islander, and 0.12% from two or more races. Hispanic or Latino of any race were 0.25% of the population.

There were 350 households, out of which 24.3% had children under the age of 18 living with them, 59.1% were married couples living together, 3.1% had a female householder with no husband present, and 32.6% were non-families. 28.3% of all households were made up of individuals, and 14.6% had someone living alone who was 65 years of age or older. The average household size was 2.27 and the average family size was 2.76.

In the town, the population was spread out, with 18.7% under the age of 18, 5.1% from 18 to 24, 24.4% from 25 to 44, 34.3% from 45 to 64, and 17.5% who were 65 years of age or older. The median age was 46 years. For every 100 females, there were 100.0 males. For every 100 females age 18 and over, there were 99.4 males.

The median income for a household in the town was $30,833, and the median income for a family was $36,691. Males had a median income of $29,808 versus $19,167 for females. The per capita income for the town was $15,535. About 6.6% of families and 10.0% of the population were below the poverty line, including 6.4% of those under age 18 and 22.5% of those age 65 or over.

== Notable person ==
- Judy Paradis, State Senator
- Nathan-Gabriel Guerrette, Musician, Author

== See also ==
- Lagassey Farm
