= Washburn, Maine =

Town in Maine, United States

- Town
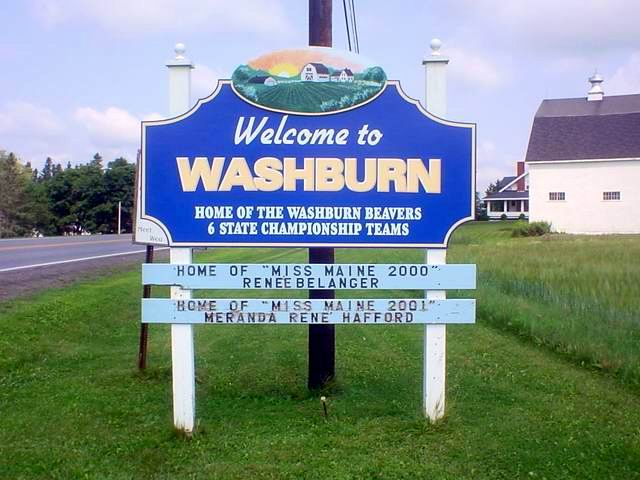
- Welcome to Washburn

- Location of Washburn, Maine
- Coordinates: 46°45′47″N 68°8′14″W
- Country: United States
- State: Maine
- County: Aroostook
- Villages: Washburn; Bugbee; Crouseville

Area
  - Total: 34.94 sq mi (90.49 km^{2})
  - Land: 34.24 sq mi (88.68 km^{2})
  - Water: 0.70 sq mi (1.81 km^{2})
- Elevation: 597 ft (182 m)

Population (2020)
  - Total: 1,527
  - Density: 45/sq mi (17.2/km^{2})
- Time zone: UTC-5 (Eastern (EST))
  - Summer (DST): UTC-4 (EDT)
- ZIP Codes: 04786 (Washburn); 04738 (Crouseville)
- Area code: 207
- FIPS code: 23-80285
- GNIS feature ID: 582791
- Website: www.washburnmaine.org

Washburn is a town in Aroostook County, Maine, United States. It was incorporated on February 25, 1861, and named after Israel Washburn, the governor of Maine at the time. The population was 1,527 at the 2020 census. Benjamin C. Wilder House, which was built in 1852, is located on Main Street in Washburn and predates the town's incorporation by nine years.

== Geography ==
According to the United States Census Bureau, the town has a total area of 34.94 square miles (90.49 km^{2}), of which 34.24 square miles (88.68 km^{2}) is land and 0.70 square miles (1.81 km^{2}) is water.

== Demographics ==
Historical population
| Census | Pop. | Note | %± |
|---|---|---|---|
| 1860 | 318 | | — |
| 1870 | 449 | | 41.2% |
| 1880 | 809 | | 80.2% |
| 1890 | 1,097 | | 35.6% |
| 1900 | 1,225 | | 11.7% |
| 1910 | 1,582 | | 29.1% |
| 1920 | 1,870 | | 18.2% |
| 1930 | 1,974 | | 5.6% |
| 1940 | 1,805 | | −8.6% |
| 1950 | 1,913 | | 6.0% |
| 1960 | 2,083 | | 8.9% |
| 1970 | 1,914 | | −8.1% |
| 1980 | 2,028 | | 6.0% |
| 1990 | 1,880 | | −7.3% |
| 2000 | 1,627 | | −13.5% |
| 2010 | 1,687 | | 3.7% |
| 2020 | 1,527 | | −9.5% |
U.S. Decennial Census

=== 2010 census ===
As of the census of 2010, there were 1,687 people, 699 households, and 483 families living in the town. The population density was 49.3 inhabitants per square mile (19.0/km^{2}). There were 768 housing units at an average density of 22.4 per square mile (8.6/km^{2}). The town's racial makeup was 96.7% White, 0.9% Native American, 0.5% Asian, 0.7% from other races, and 1.2% from two or more races. Hispanic or Latino of any race were 1.4% of the population.

There were 699 households, of which 27.5% had children under the age of 18 living with them, 56.2% were married couples living together, 8.7% had a female householder with no husband present, 4.1% had a male householder with no wife present, and 30.9% were non-families. 23.7% of all households were made up of individuals, and 11.8% had someone living alone who was 65 years of age or older. The average household size was 2.41 and the average family size was 2.85.

The median age in the town was 44.4 years. 21.9% of residents were under the age of 18; 6.9% were between the ages of 18 and 24; 21.9% were from 25 to 44; 30.7% were from 45 to 64; and 18.7% were 65 years of age or older. The gender makeup of the town was 48.5% male and 51.5% female.

=== 2000 census ===
As of the census of 2000, there were 1,627 people, 692 households, and 501 families living in the town. The population density was 47.5 inhabitants per square mile (18.3/km^{2}). There were 766 housing units at an average density of 22.4 per square mile. The racial makeup of the town was 98.71% White, 0.12% Black, 0.37% American Indian, 0.12% Asian, and 0.68% from two or more races. Hispanic or Latino of any race were 0.31% of the population.

There were 692 households, out of which 27.2% had children under the age of 18 living with them, 60.8% were married couples living together, 7.4% had a female householder with no husband present, and 27.6% were non-families. 24.0% of all households were made up of individuals, and 13.0% had someone living alone who was 65 years of age or older. The average household size was 2.35 and the average family size was 2.73.

In the town, the population was spread out, with 20.5% under the age of 18, 7.4% from 18 to 24, 25.9% from 25 to 44, 28.7% from 45 to 64, and 17.4% who were 65 years of age or older. The median age was 42 years. For every 100 females, there were 96.5 males. For every 100 females age 18 and over, there were 92.7 males.

The median income for a household in the town was $30,338, and the median income for a family was $34,122. Males had a median income of $28,203 versus $19,783 for females. The per capita income for the town was $15,018. About 9.5% of families and 13.3% of the population were below the poverty line, including 18.7% of those under age 18 and 10.2% of those age 65 or over.

== Notable people ==
- James Chico Hernandez, wrestler, Maine Sports Hall of Fame member
- Richard C. Thomas, Secretary of State of Vermont

== Education ==
MSAD 45 consists of two public schools; David J. Lyon Washburn District Elementary School (K–8), which is named after long time former Superintendent of Schools David J Lyon, and Washburn District High School (9–12). Most students reside in Washburn, but some come from Wade and Perham.
