= Square Lake (Washington County, Minnesota) =

Lake in the state of Minnesota, United States

- Location within Minnesota
- Location: Washington County, Minnesota
- Coordinates: 45°9′24″N 92°48′15″W
- Type: lake

Square Lake is a lake in Washington County, in the U.S. state of Minnesota. Located near Stillwater, Minnesota it is a popular destination for fishing, swimming, and Scuba diving. The lake has a surface area of approximately 203 acres and a maximum depth of 68 feet. The Minnesota Department of Natural Resources (Minnesota DNR) lists fish species present in Square Lake as: Northern Pike, Largemouth Bass, Bluegill, Crappie, Rainbow Trout, Bullhead species, and Yellow Perch.

Square Lake County Park is located on the Southeast shore of the lake. Features of this park include a boat launch, fishing pier, swimming beach, and scuba diving entry area. The park is also the site of the annual Square Lake 70.3 Triathlon.

A private park, Golden Acres RV Park, is also located on the Southern end of Square Lake (immediately next to Square Lake County Park). This park also has a swimming beach with scuba diving entry area as well as boat rentals and seasonal RV camping sites.

Square Lake is said to have been named as a reference to the boxy shape of its shoreline.

== See also ==
- List of lakes in Minnesota
