= Square Lake, Maine =

- Unorganized territory
- Location of Square Lake, Maine
- Coordinates: 46°59′46″N 68°21′23″W
- Country: United States
- State: Maine
- County: Aroostook

Area
  - Total: 414.4 sq mi (1,073.3 km^{2})
  - Land: 382.8 sq mi (991.5 km^{2})
  - Water: 31.6 sq mi (81.8 km^{2})
- Elevation: 591 ft (180 m)

Population (2020)
  - Total: 706
  - Density: 1.84/sq mi (0.712/km^{2})
- Time zone: UTC-5 (Eastern (EST))
  - Summer (DST): UTC-4 (EDT)
- ZIP Code: 04779 (Sinclair)
- Area code: 207
- FIPS code: 23-73472
- GNIS feature ID: 582742

Square Lake is an unorganized territory in Aroostook County, Maine, United States. The population was 706 at the 2020 census.

== Geography ==
According to the United States Census Bureau, the unorganized territory has a total area of 414.4 square miles (1,073.3 km^{2}), of which 382.8 square miles (991.5 km^{2}) is land and 31.6 square miles (81.8 km^{2}), or 7.63%, is water. There are several lakes in the unorganized territory, including the eponymous Square Lake as well as Eagle Lake, Cross Lake, and Mud Lake.

There are 10 townships within the unorganized territory, plus one (T14R6 WELS) that is shared with Northwest Aroostook.

== Demographics ==
Historical population
Census	Pop.	Note	%±
1980	604		—
1990	564		−6.6%
2000	615		9.0%
2010	594		−3.4%
2020	706		18.9%
U.S. Decennial Census

As of the 2000 census, there were 615 people, 277 households, and 193 families living in the unorganized territory. The population density was 1.6 people per square mile (0.6/km^{2}). There were 1,086 housing units, at an average density of 2.8 per square mile (1.1/km^{2}). The racial makeup was 99.51% White and 0.49% from two or more races.

There were 277 households, of which 19.5% had children under the age of 18 living with them, 62.5% were married couples living together, 4.3% had a female householder with no husband present, and 30.0% were non-families. In the unorganized territory, 24.5% of all households were made up of individuals, and 10.1% had someone living alone who was 65 years of age or older. The average household size was 2.22, and the average family size was 2.61.

In the unorganized territory, 17.4% of the population were under the age of 18, 4.2% were 18 to 24, 17.4% were 25 to 44, 40.0% were 45 to 64, and 21.0% were 65 or older. The median age was 50 years. For every 100 females, there were 106.4 males. For every 100 females age 18 and over, there were 104.0 males.

The median income for a household in the unorganized territory was $27,692, and the median income for a family was $31,250. Males had a median income of $33,333, versus $22,500 for females. The per capita income for the unorganized territory was $17,595. About 10.3% of families and 16.2% of the population were below the poverty line, including 27.9% of those under age 18 and 13.7% of those age 65 or over.
