= Perham, Maine =

Town in Maine, United States

- Town
- Location of Perham, Maine
- Coordinates: 46°52′54″N 68°14′21″W
- Country: United States
- State: Maine
- County: Aroostook

Area
  - Total: 36.64 sq mi (94.90 km^{2})
  - Land: 36.53 sq mi (94.61 km^{2})
  - Water: 0.11 sq mi (0.28 km^{2})
- Elevation: 673 ft (205 m)

Population (2020)
  - Total: 371
  - Density: 10/sq mi (3.9/km^{2})
- Time zone: UTC-5 (Eastern (EST))
  - Summer (DST): UTC-4 (EDT)
- ZIP code: 04766
- Area code: 207
- FIPS code: 23-58060
- GNIS feature ID: 582670

Perham is a town in Aroostook County, Maine, United States. The population was 371 at the 2020 census. The town was named after Maine's 33rd governor, Sidney Perham.

== Geography ==
According to the United States Census Bureau, the town has a total area of 36.64 square miles (94.90 km^{2}), of which 36.53 square miles (94.61 km^{2}) is land and 0.11 square miles (0.28 km^{2}) is water.

== Demographics ==
Historical population
Census	Pop.	Note	%±
1870	79		—
1880	346		338.0%
1890	438		26.6%
1900	580		32.4%
1910	785		35.3%
1920	659		−16.1%
1930	691		4.9%
1940	680		−1.6%
1950	572		−15.9%
1960	512		−10.5%
1970	436		−14.8%
1980	437		0.2%
1990	395		−9.6%
2000	434		9.9%
2010	386		−11.1%
2020	371		−3.9%
U.S. Decennial Census

=== 2010 census ===
At the 2010 census, there were 386 people, 151 households, and 105 families living in the town. The population density was 10.6 inhabitants per square mile (4.1/km^{2}). There were 190 housing units at an average density of 5.2 per square mile (2.0/km^{2}). The racial makeup of the town was 97.4% White, 2.3% Native American, and 0.3% from two or more races. Of the 151 households 27.8% had children under the age of 18 living with them, 59.6% were married couples living together, 3.3% had a female householder with no husband present, 6.6% had a male householder with no wife present, and 30.5% were non-families. 23.8% of households were one person and 11.9% were one person aged 65 or older. The average household size was 2.56 and the average family size was 3.04.

The median age in the town was 45.3 years. 20.2% of residents were under the age of 18; 6.9% were between the ages of 18 and 24; 22% were from 25 to 44; 34.9% were from 45 to 64; and 15.8% were 65 or older. The gender makeup of the town was 51.0% male and 49.0% female.

=== 2000 census ===
At the 2000 census, there were 434 people, 162 households, and 114 families living in the town. The population density was 11.9 people per square mile (4.6/km^{2}). There were 177 housing units at an average density of 4.8 per square mile (1.9/km^{2}). The racial makeup of the town was 96.08% White, 0.92% Native American, and 3.00% from two or more races. Of the 162 households 28.4% had children under the age of 18 living with them, 61.1% were married couples living together, 7.4% had a female householder with no husband present, and 29.6% were non-families. 21.6% of households were one person and 10.5% were one person aged 65 or older. The average household size was 2.68 and the average family size was 3.22.

The age distribution was 24.0% under the age of 18, 8.8% from 18 to 24, 24.2% from 25 to 44, 24.2% from 45 to 64, and 18.9% 65 or older. The median age was 40 years. For every 100 females, there were 99.1 males. For every 100 females age 18 and over, there were 103.7 males.

The median household income was $25,962 and the median family income was $31,250. Males had a median income of $25,341 versus $17,917 for females. The per capita income for the town was $11,721. About 7.8% of families and 11.2% of the population were below the poverty line, including 17.2% of those under age 18 and 6.5% of those age 65 or over.
