= Pope & Talbot, Inc. =

Former US Lumber Company

Pope & Talbot, Inc. (Puget Mill Company)
- Traded as: Expert Market: PTBTQ
- Industry: Lumber, paper, shipping
- Founded: 1849 in San Francisco, California, United States
- Fate: Chapter 7 in 2008.
- Area served: North America
- Key people: Andrew Jackson Pope; Frederic Talbot
- Products: Timber and paper (pulp)
- Subsidiaries: Pope & Talbot Pulp Ltd.; Pope & Talbot Wis., Inc.; Pope & Talbot Pulp Sales Europe, LLC
- Website: poptal.com

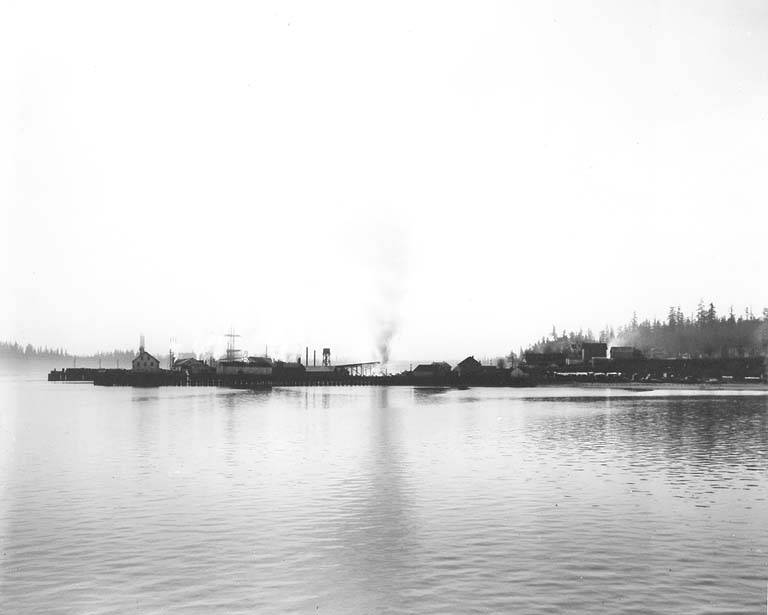
Port Gamble lumber mill, 1904

Pope & Talbot, Inc. was a lumber company and shipping company founded by Andrew Jackson Pope and Frederic Talbot in 1849 in San Francisco, California. Pope and Talbot came to California in 1849 from East Machias, Maine. Pope & Talbot lumber company was very successful, with the high demand of the 1849 Gold Rush. Andrew Jackson Pope was born on Jan. 6, 1820, in East Machias, Maine, and died on Dec. 18, 1878, in San Francisco. Frederic Talbot was born on February 26, 1819, in East Machias, Maine and died on December 20, 1907, in San Francisco.

== History ==
To ship product Pope & Talbot acquired ships. In 1852, Pope & Talbot opened a lumberyard and at Port Gamble, Washington started construction of a lumber mill and start the firm Puget Mill Company. To feed the mill Pope & Talbot purchased timberland, by 1892 owning 186,000 acres. In 1925, the Puget Mill Company mill was sold to Charles R. McCormick Lumber Company. In 1938, the Pope & Talbot families owned the mill again after McCormick was unable to make payments. In 1940, the Puget Mill Company was renamed Pope & Talbot, Inc. Pope & Talbot, Inc. was active in supporting the World War II effort with lumber and ship. The mill ran 24/7 for the war. In 1963, Pope & Talbot exited the shipping trade and sold off the remaining four ships in the Pope & Talbot fleet. In 1972 Pope & Talbot went public, selling stocks. In 1978 Pope & Talbot open a pulp plant in Halsey, Oregon, kraft pulp mill. In 1992, Pope & Talbot purchased a sawmill in Castlegar, British Columbia. Sawmill at Port Gamble is closed in 1995, after 142 years of use. In 1999, Pope & Talbot purchased Harmac Pacific in Nanaimo, British Columbia. In 2001, Pope & Talbot purchased Norske Skog Canada's Mackenzie Pulp mill in northern British Columbia. Pope & Talbot as both a pulp / paper line and lumber - wood line. At the time the company receiver divested lumber mill operations their mills were one in South Dakota and three in British Columbia. Pope & Talbot went bankrupt in 2008 and the lumber mills were divested. A timberland investment and management company named Pope Resources was spun off. In 2020 Pope Resources was acquired by a larger East Coast based lumber company Rayonier. Rayonier was originally also founded on the Olympic Peninsula.

=== The Legend of White Gold (1988) ===
Joseph Rassulo directed a television movie starring Richard Glover as Andrew Pope and Nick Young as Fred Talbot. It is a 20 minute promotional spoof of John Ford western films produced for Pope & Talbot by Turtledove Clemens, which won a bronze medal at the 32nd annual International Film & TV Festival of New York and Best in the West award from the Business and Professional Advertising Association.

== World War II ==
Pope & Talbot fleet of ships that were used to help the World War II effort. During World War II Pope & Talbot operated Merchant navy ships for the United States Shipping Board. During World War II Pope & Talbot was active with charter shipping with the Maritime Commission and War Shipping Administration. Pope & Talbot operated Liberty ships and Victory ships for the merchant navy. The ship was run by its Pope & Talbot crew and the US Navy supplied United States Navy Armed Guards to man the deck guns and radio.

== Ships ==
- SS Absaroka
- SS China Victory, as SS P & T. Leader starting in 1951
- USS Mendocino (APA-100)
- SS Saginaw Victory
- SS Brainerd Victory
- Cyrus Walker 1864 Tug
- Goliah 1849 Tug
- SS Saginaw Victory
- USS Sitka (APA-113)

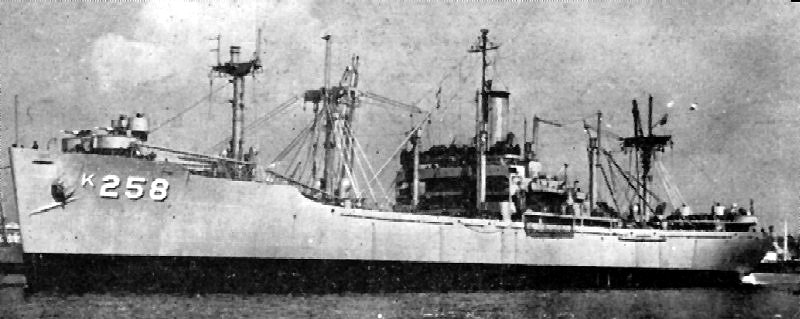
A Victory ship of World War II

Liberty ship of World War II

  - Liberty ships operated:
- George A. Pope
- George B. Porter
- Laura Bridgman
- Joe Fellows
- John Roach
- Ada Rehan
- Allen C. Balch
- Charles A. McCue
- Charles Robinson
- William Allen White
- West Portal, on Feb. 5, 1943 torpedoed by German submarine U-413
- Brander Matthews
- Russell R. Jones
- James A. Wilder
- Henry Villard
  - Victory ships operated:
- SS Seton Hall Victory
- SS Twin Falls Victory
- SS Provo Victory
- Brainerd Victory

== See also ==
- World War II United States Merchant Navy
- Swanee Paper
