= SS China Victory =

United States Merchant Marine ship

- Typical Victory ship

History

United States
- Name: SS China Victory
- Namesake: Republic of China
- Owner: War Shipping Administration
- Operator: Matson Navigation Company
- Builder: California Shipbuilding Company, Los Angeles
- Laid down: November 28, 1943
- Launched: January 26, 1944
- Completed: April 1, 1944
- Fate: Sold

United States
- Name: SS P & T. Leader 1951
- Operator: Pope & Talbot, Inc.
- Fate: Sold

United States
- Name: SS Smith Leader 1962
- Operator: Sumner A. Long
- Fate: Sold

United States
- Name: SS Transnorthern 1965
- Operator: Hudson Waterways Corp
- Fate: Sold

United States
- Name: SS Buckeye Victory 1969
- Operator: Buckeye Steamship Co,
- Fate: Scrapped in 1972 at Kaohsiung, Taiwan

General characteristics
- Class & type: VC2-S-AP3 Victory ship
- Tonnage: 7612 GRT, 4,553 NRT
- Displacement: 15,200 tons
- Length: 455 ft (139 m)
- Beam: 62 ft (19 m)
- Draft: 28 ft (8.5 m)
- Installed power: 8,500 shp (6,300 kW)
- Propulsion: HP & LP turbines geared to a single 20.5-foot (6.2 m) propeller
- Speed: 16.5 knots
- Boats & landing craft carried: 4 Lifeboats
- Complement: 62 Merchant Marine and 28 US Naval Armed Guards
- Armament: 1 × 5 inch (127 mm)/38 caliber gun; 1 × 3 inch (76 mm)/50 caliber gun; 8 × 20 mm Oerlikon

The SS China Victory was a Victory ship built during World War II under the Emergency Shipbuilding program. She was launched by the California Shipbuilding Company on January 26, 1944, and completed on April 1, 1944. The ship's United States Maritime Commission designation was 'VC2- S- AP3, hull number 1'. She was operated by the Matson Navigation Company of Hawaii. SS China Victory served in the Pacific Ocean during World War II. The 10,500-ton Victory ships were designed to replace the earlier Liberty Ships. Liberty ships were designed to be used just for World War II compared to Victory ships, which were designed to last longer and serve the US Navy after the war. Victory ships differed from Liberty ships in that they were faster, longer and wider, taller, had a thinner stack set farther toward the superstructure, and had a long raised forecastle.

SS China Victory was christened by the Republic of China's Envoy's wife, Wei Tao-ming. The ceremony had both an ancient Chinese invocation to the sea gods and the traditional American tradition of a bottle of champagne breaking. The matron of honor at the launching was Mrs. T. K. Chang, wife of the Chinese consul at Los Angeles. SS China Victory was one of a long line of Victory ships to leave the Calship building.

== World War II ==
SS China Victory picked up her crew in San Francisco and headed to Honolulu. The 233rd Engineer Combat Battalion's Transport Quartermaster Team loaded in to the China Victory at Honolulu starting on July 1, 1944. A 100-man team working 12-hour shifts was used to load her with the goods needed for island fighting. On July 7, 1944, she was loaded to the max and on July 9, 1944, she departed Honolulu Harbor for Guam, in a convoy. The flagship of the convoy was the SS Monrovia with the 307th Combat Team. Also in the convoy was the USS Alcione, transporting the 1st Battalion, 307th Infantry, and Company A, 233d Engineers; the USS Frederick Funston transporting the 2nd Battalion, 307th Infantry, and Company B, 233d Engineers; the USS War Hawk transporting the 3rd Battalion, 307th Infantry, and Company C, 233d Engineers; the USAT Noordam; the USS Elmore; the USS Harris; the USS Herald of the Morning; the USS Barnstable; the USS Goodhue; the USS Montrail; the USS Eastland; the USS Telfair; and the USS Wyandot. On the way to Guam the convoy stopped at the base at Enewetak Atoll. China Victory was taking all the supplies and vehicles for the 233rd Engineer Combat Battalion to the Second Battle of Guam, fought from July 21 to August 10 of 1944; the Battle of Leyte (at Battle of Ormoc Bay) from October 17 to December 26, 1944; the Battle of Iwo Jima from February 19 to March 26, 1945; and the Battle of Okinawa from April 1 until June 22, 1945. From Okinawa she steamed to Japan. China Victory took from island to island thirty-four hundred tons of artillery, ammunition, gas, trucks, guns, rations, water, medical supplies and more. China Victory load included sixty medium tanks; thirty-six light tanks; 139 trucks and jeeps; thirty days of supplies for the Combat Team, including gas and oil and rations by the hundreds of cases; 650 tons of ammunition; nineteen outboard motors; fifty-four 10-man rubber boats; lumber; wire; T.N.T.; clothing; shoes; mosquito repellent; salt tablets; arms; bandages; typewriter ribbons; and thousands of other needed items. It was the battalion’s TQM's responsibility to load and unload her at each stop. It was the job of Floyd K. Oglesby to kept a record of her load; he knew what was removed, reloaded and on the ship at all times and were to find it. The China Victory arrived July 22, 1944, at Guam; the battle had started the day before. One of the first things to be unloaded was 10-man rubber inflatable boats so the wounded could be moved from the beach to the hospital ship by the engineers. China Victory was close to Japan near the end of the war and saw the Atomic bombings of Hiroshima and Nagasaki on August 6 and 9, 1945.

== After World War II ==
After World War II she was laid up Astoria, Oregon, then moved to Olympia, Washington, for a short time as part of the National Defense Reserve Fleet. In 1947 she travelled to East Asia. On March 12, 1947, China Victory found the empty lifeboat of the broken-up T2 tanker SS Fort Dearborn that sank on March 12. China Victory was on the way to the Philippines from San Francisco when she reported the discovery of the lifeboat, floating upside down in the water, about 885 miles northwest of Oahu. On August 27, 1947, she delivered 31 tons of food and 7.9 tons of clothing to Yokohama, Japan, as part of relief supplies. On May 11, 1949, she transported 7.23 tons of clothing to Yokohama and on April 2, 1949, delivered 13.75 tons of food. She also steamed to Qingdao port in Mainland China, then to Shanghai. Departing Shanghai the China Victory was the last American-flagged vessel to leave Shanghai before the Communist takeover, departing the Shanghai Campaign in 1949. From Shanghai she steamed home. China Victory then steamed to Taiwan to unload crated airplanes and truck tires. Another first, the China Victory was the first American-flagged ship to return to Shanghai after the Communist takeover, when she unloaded some goods and picked up 12 expatriates who wanted to depart Communist China, including a reporter/photographer for Life magazine. China Victory unloaded onto an offshore barge terminal called Taku Bar, with goods for Tianjin, a Communist Mao Zedong port. She stopped at Japan before heading home.

== Korean War ==
The China Victory served in the Korean War from June 25, 1950, until July 27, 1953, helping American forces engaged against Communist aggression in South Korea. About 75 percent of the personnel taken to Korea for the Korean War came by the merchant marine ships. SS China Victory transported goods, mail, food and other supplies. About 90% of the cargo was moved by merchant marine ships to the war zone.

== Private use ==
In 1951 she was sold to Pope & Talbot, Inc., of San Francisco and renamed SS P. & T. Leader. In 1962 she was sold to Sumner A. Long, New York and again renamed SS Smith Leader. In 1965 she was sold to Hudson Waterways Corp of New York City and renamed SS Transnorthern. In 1969 she was sold to Buckeye Steamship Co of New York and renamed SS Buckeye Victory. In 1972 she was taken to Taiwan and scrapped at Kaohsiung.

== Honors ==
SS China Victory's Naval Armed Guard crews, as a U.S. Merchant Marine Ship, earned Battle Stars in World War II for war actions from November 5 to 29, 1944, during the landings at Leyte.

== Sources ==
- Sawyer, L.A. and W.H. Mitchell. Victory ships and tankers: The history of the ‘Victory’ type cargo ships and of the tankers built in the United States of America during World War II, Cornell Maritime Press, 1974, 0-87033-182-5.
- United States Maritime Commission:
- Victory Cargo Ships
