= Fred Talbot (disambiguation) =

Fred Talbot (born 1949) is a British former teacher and television presenter.

Fred or Fredrick Talbot(t) may also refer to:

- Frederic Talbot (1819–1907), American businessman
- Fred Talbott (1843–1918), U.S. congressman
  - USS J. Fred Talbott
- Fred Talbot (footballer) (1885-1959), English footballer, see List of Bury F.C. players (1–24 appearances)
- Frederick Talbot (1908-?), rugby league footballer of the 1930s for Wales, Huddersfield, and Keighley
- Frederick Hilborn Talbot, Permanent Representative of Guyana to the United Nations
- Fred Talbot (baseball) (1941–2013), Major League Baseball player
