= Fort Foster =

Fort Foster may refer to:

- Fort Foster, a 19th-century fortification in Florida
- Fort Foster (Kittery, Maine), built in 1872 and now a public park
- Fort Foster (Washington County, Maine), an earthworks of the American Revolutionary War near Machias
