= Lubec Consolidated School =

School in Lubec, Maine, United States

Coordinates: 44.8552°N 66.9883°W

Lubec Consolidated School, also known as Lubec Elementary School, is a PreK-8 school in Lubec, Maine. It is a part of Regional School Unit 85/Maine School Administrative District 19. It previously was a PreK-12 school. The high school program was in the same building as the elementary and middle school.

== History ==
The current school building opened in the 1970s. In 1997, there were 95 students in the high school level. That year, Diane Graettinger of The Bangor Daily News wrote that "many adults retain a fierce pride in the school, as well as a sense that it is important to the future of the community."

The high school program ended in 2010, when it had 37 students. The impetus for the closing was a decline in $579,000 in funding from the government of Maine. First, the school board voted to close the high school, and then residents voted 269 votes for and 230 votes against to close the high school. The closure happened even though a resident started a movement to try to stop the closure.

High schools taking Lubec students included Machias High School, Shead High School, and Washington Academy. The district and the city, seeing the commute across the Cobscook Bay to be possibly hazardous, chose not to authorize using a ferry to send students to Eastport High School. Washington Academy, a private school that receives public funds to take some students from areas around Lubec, had, in the period prior to the closure of Lubec High, given scholarships to some Lubec students.

Circa 2019 there was an attempt to reopen the high school division as some residents still wanted it to exist. In 2018 a committee called for the Committee to Investigate the Feasibility of Reopening Lubec High School decided that the school should remain closed. Joyce Kryszak of the Maine Monitor stated that ending the high school was "controversial".

== Curriculum ==
In 1997 the only foreign language offered at the high school was French. That year, the high school had a chemistry laboratory, though it did not in previous eras. The interim superintendent of the school district, Briane Coulthard, stated in 1997 that the high school had prowress in the English language classes and in the hard sciences, with the latter due to the breadth of course offerings. He stated that having strong foreign languages, art, and music programs in the high school division was not a viable proposition as the high school program was too small.
