= Swanee Paper =

- Headquarters: Ransom, Pennsylvania, United States

Swanee Paper Corporation manufactured paper in Ransom, Pennsylvania, United States. The paper mill still exists, although the company does not. In 1998, Pope & Talbot sold the 55,000 tons-per-year paper mill to Plainwell, Inc. As a result of Plainwell's November 2000 chapter 11 reorganization petition in federal bankruptcy court, the mill was sold to Perkins Papers, Ltd., a part of Canadian company Cascades, Inc., in 2001.

== History ==
An A&P advertisement on page 11 of the April 13, 1960 Gettysburg Times showed Swanee paper towels for sale. The mill now makes private label tissue, towel, and napkin products.

In 1961, Swanee Paper sued the Federal Trade Commission over allegations that Swanee violated the Clayton Act in its dealings with Grand Union, a supermarket chain, in buying advertising on the "Epok Panel", an advertising sign in Times Square using electrical lights to provide animated messages. The Federal Trade Commission won, but the case was overturned on appeal.

Swanee Paper Company, Inc., was registered as a corporation with the Pennsylvania Secretary of State on January 13, 1969, with an address of CT Corporation System, 123 South Broad Street, Philadelphia, Pennsylvania. The current status of this registration is "withdrawn".

Swanee Paper Corporation was registered as a corporation with the Pennsylvania Secretary of State on August 17, 1961, with no address other than Ransom, Pennsylvania. The current status of this registration is "withdrawn".

The paper mill is on the old Lehigh Valley Railroad.
