= Fort Foster (Washington County, Maine) =

- "The Rim" and Site of Fort Foster
- U.S. National Register of Historic Places
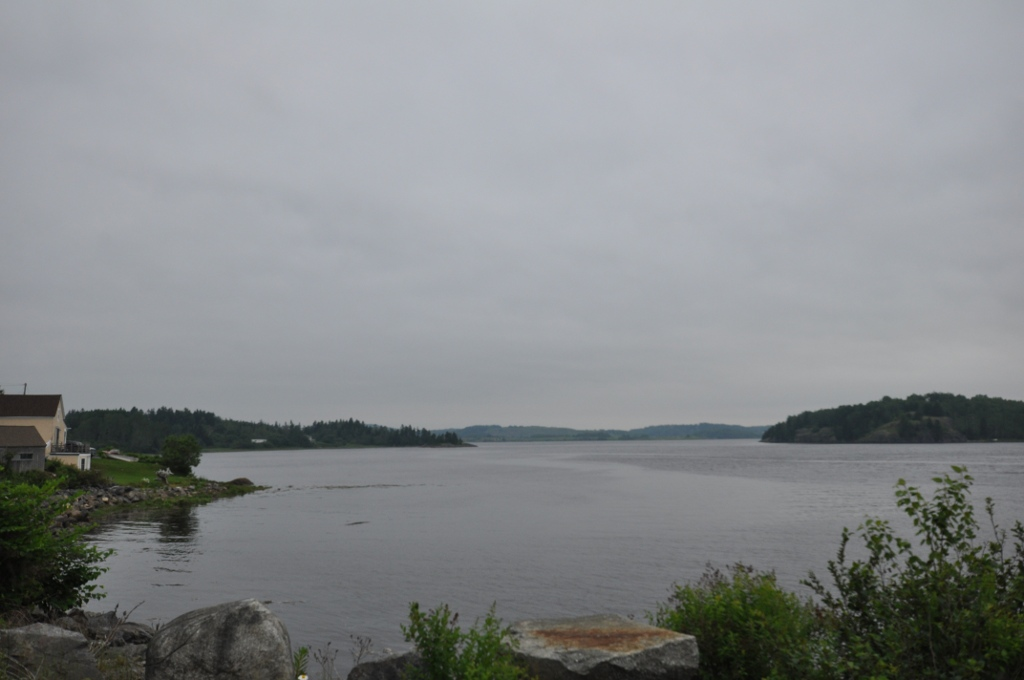
- View toward The Rim from the south

- Location within Maine Location within the United States
- Nearest city: East Machias, Maine
- Coordinates: 44°43′1″N 67°23′45″W
- Area: 200 acres (81 ha)
- Built: 1775
- NRHP reference No.: 73000155
- Added to NRHP: July 23, 1973

Fort Foster was a military site of the American Revolutionary War in what is now East Machias, Maine. Little more than a large earthworks, it was located on The Rim, a neck of land that commands the confluence of the Machias and East Machias Rivers. The earthworks were built in 1776, and attacked by British forces in the 1777 Battle of Machias. The site was listed on the National Register of Historic Places in 1973.

== Description and history ==
Machias Bay is located in Down East Maine, and is fed primarily by the Machias River, which flows generally eastward from the town of Machias toward its confluence with the East Machias River, and then southward into the bay. The East Machias River flows generally southward from Hadley Lake, past the village center of East Machias. Shortly before it meets the Machias River, it bends sharply to the east before turning south again to empty into the other river. The landform between this bend and the point of confluence is locally known as "The Rim". In the 18th century it was recognized for its military value, as it provides a commanding view of the southern stretch of the Machias River and into the bay.

Early records of the area's settlement are not clear on when The Rim was first occupied; the area was first settled by Europeans in 1763, and the land was known to have been cleared and in agriculture use by the start of the American Revolutionary War in 1775. Machias was the site of one of the war's first naval encounters, in which a British Navy sloop was captured. After this event, the townspeople decided to fortify The Rim. A breastwork was built there, which was sufficient to repel an attempted landing by British forces in the summer of 1775. In 1776 a more extensive breastwork was built, along with a watch house and barracks, and a log boom was laid across the river just to the south. In August 1777, the British once again arrived in force, and in the second Battle of Machias landed forces on The Rim. Guns mounted at Fort Foster fired on the first ships to arrive, but the fort was abandoned prior to the landing, and its guns were destroyed.

After the war The Rim appears to have been abandoned and allowed to become overgrown. In the 1920s it was cleared for blueberry production, and its earthworks, some as much as 6 feet (1.8 m) in height, were still visible then. They have since again become overgrown.

== See also ==
- National Register of Historic Places listings in Washington County, Maine
