= Austin Cary =

American forester

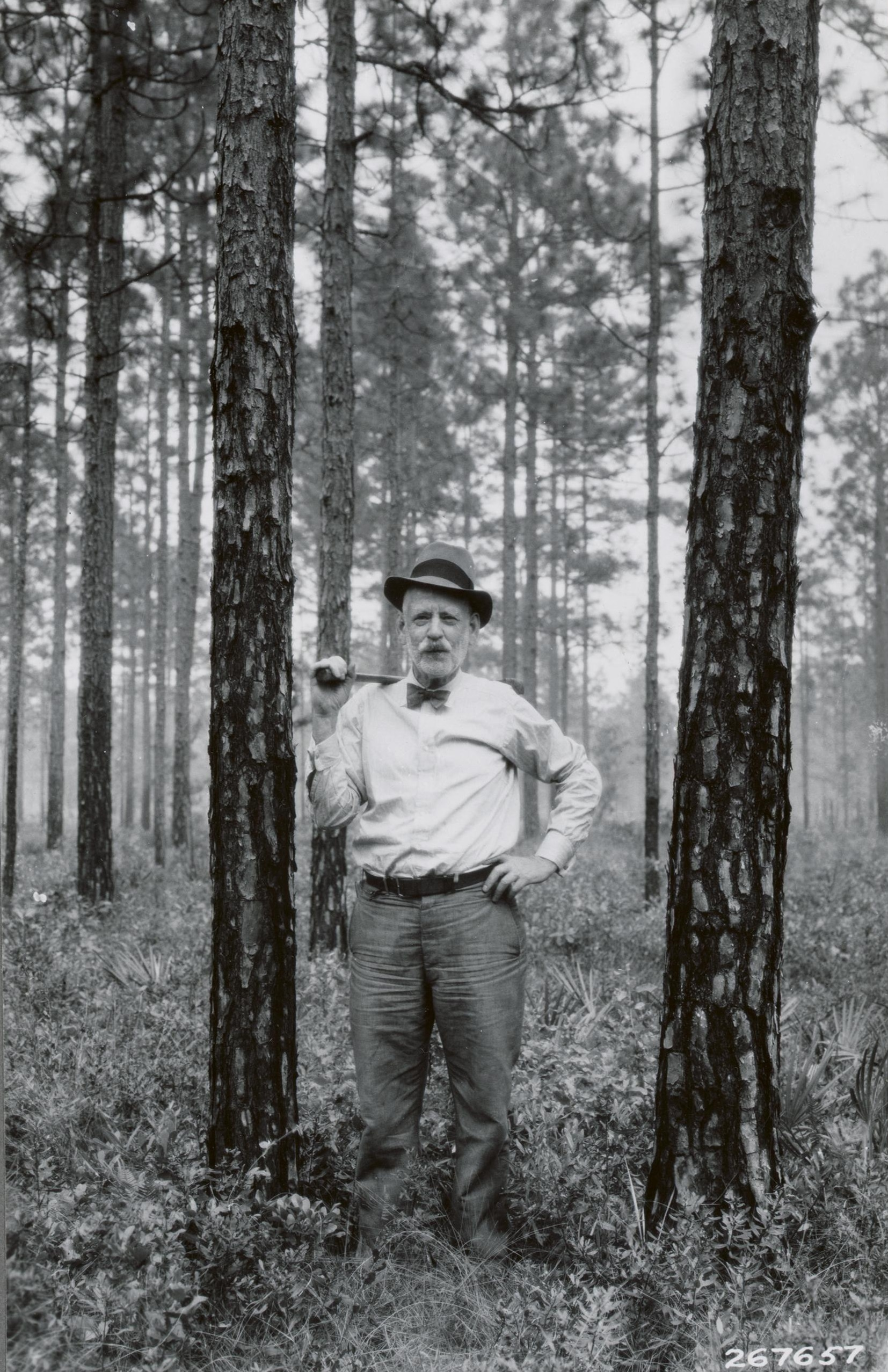
- Cary at Osceola National Forest, Florida, in 1932
- Born: July 31, 1865; East Machias, Maine, U.S.
- Died: April 28, 1936 (aged 70); Gainesville, Florida, U.S.
- Occupation: forester

Austin Cary (July 31, 1865 – April 28, 1936) was an American forester, known as the "father of southern forestry". Austin Cary Forest, on Great Island, Maine, is named for him.

== Early life and education ==
Cary was born in 1865 in East Machias, Maine, to Charles Cary and Mary Eliza. He was one of their two sons, the other being George. He was a descendent of John Cary, who arrived in the Massachusetts Bay Colony from Bristol, England, in 1630. Caleb Cary, Austin's grandfather, moved north in the early 19th century, settling in East Machias.

He was educated at Washington Academy in East Machias. He graduated with honors from Bowdoin College in 1887. After working as an instructor in Biology and Geology at Bowdoin for a year, he moved to Johns Hopkins University, where he studied biology for eighteen months.

In 1890, Cary studied paleontology at Princeton.

== Career ==
In the summer of 1891, Cary took part in the Bowdoin Scientific Expedition to Labrador, led by Professor Leslie A. Lee. With Dennis Cole, he traveled 300 miles (480 km) along the Churchill River to Grand Falls, discovering a navigable waterway which extended in continuous form for around 90 miles (140 km). They named the canyon at the bottom of Grand Falls the "Bowdoin Canyon" and named a nearby peak Mount Hyde, after Bowdoin president William DeWitt Hyde. Cary kept a diary of the expedition, later published in a bulletin by the American Geographical Society.

Cary initially began his career as a teacher at Harvard University, but later became a pioneer in forestry. He had a 25-year career with the United States Forest Service. His Woodsman's Manual (originally named Manual for Northern Woodsmen) became an important reference. He wrote over one hundred articles for various periodicals, including the American Geographical Society, Journal of Forestry and American Lumberman.

In 1893, Cary served for three years with the Federal Division of Forestry, having been given the role by Dr. Bernhard Fernow of the Bureau of Forestry.

Between 1898 and 1904, he worked for the Berlin Mills Company, which was prominent in northern New Hampshire and his home state of Maine.

In 1908, Maine governor William T. Cobb selected Cary to represent the state at the Great Natural Resources Conference in Washington, D.C. The following year, he was appointed Superintendent of Forests for New York, but resigned in 1910 due to ill health. Later that year, he became Senior Logging Engineer with the U.S. Forest Service. He worked with them for the next 25 years, retiring at the age of 70 in 1935.

== Personal life ==
Cary married Lelia J. Chisholm, of Seattle, Washington, on October 8, 1916. She died in May the following year.

In 1922, Cary was awarded a doctorate of Science by Bowdoin College. Two years later, be became a Fellow of the Society of American Foresters.

After retiring, Cary split his time between living in Lake City, Florida, and Brunswick, Maine, where he had a home on Gurnet Road, which leads to Harpswell.

== Death ==
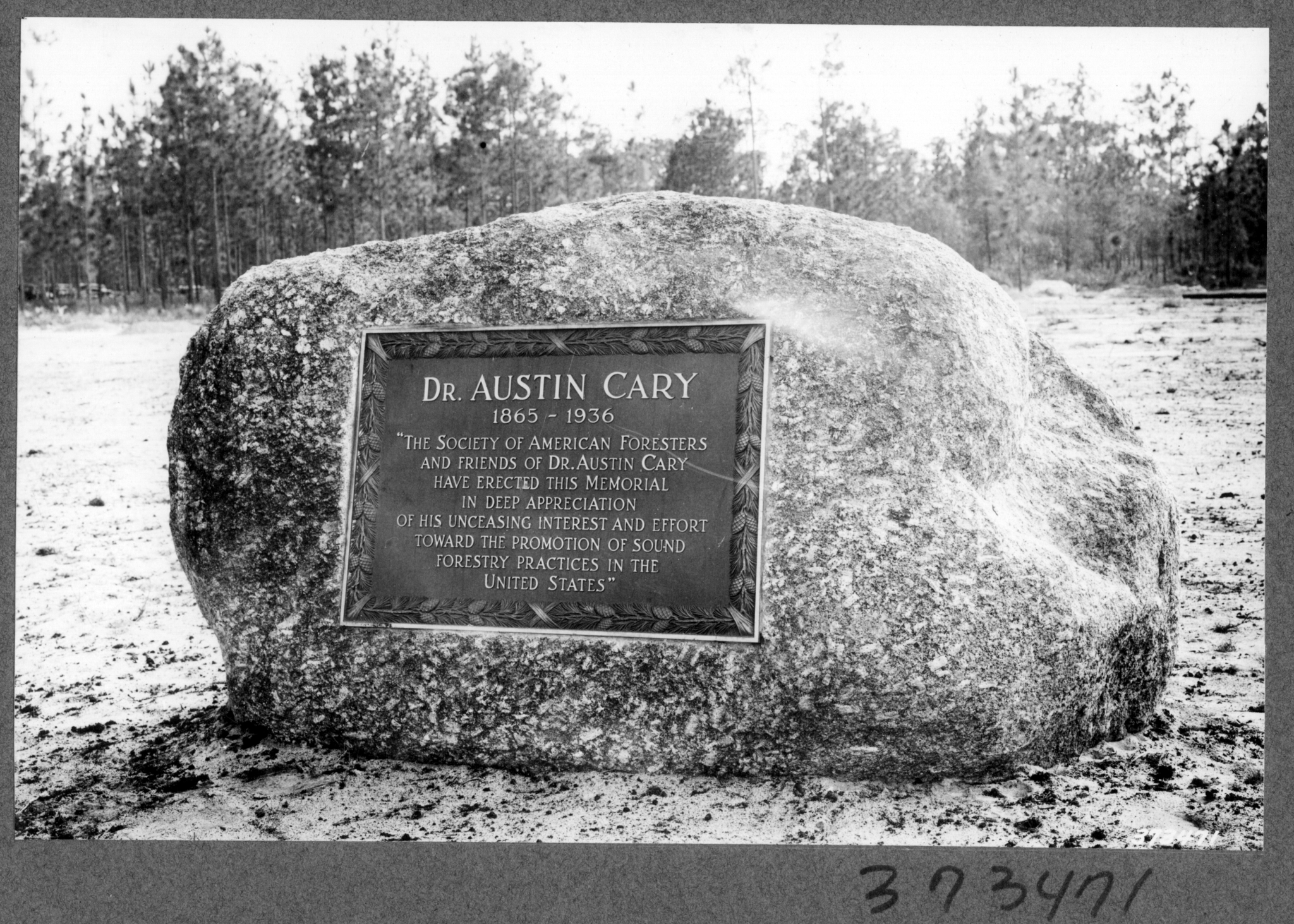
Memorial to Cary

Cary died at the University of Florida in Gainesville, Florida, in 1936, after a cardiac arrest. He was 70 years old. His body was cremated in Jacksonville, Florida.

=== Legacy ===
A memorial to Cary was erected beside Florida State Road 13, ten miles from Gainesville. It is a granite boulder, which was transported 1,500 miles (2,400 km) from Machias. On it is a bronze plaque with an inscription by T. A. Liefeld of the Forestry Department.

Austin Cary Forest, a 200-acre (81 ha) wood, on Great Island, Maine, is named for him. It was established by sisters Dr. Virginia Hamilton Bailey and Patricia Hamilton Lowery Bousfield.
