= Lubec Channel Light =

Lighthouse in Maine, US

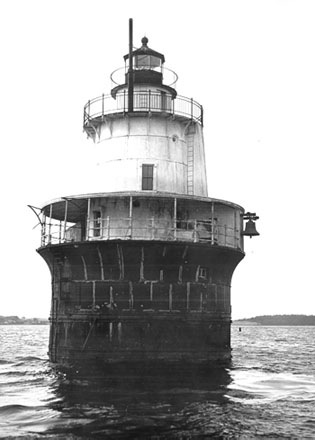
- Location: Lubec, Maine
- Coordinates: 44°50′31.387″N 66°58′35.822″W

Tower
- Constructed: 1890
- Automated: 1968
- Height: 12 m (39 ft)
- Shape: Conical Tower
- Markings: White tower on black pier
- Heritage: National Register of Historic Places listed place
- Fog signal: HORN: 1 every 15s

Light
- Focal height: 53 feet (16 m)
- Lens: 6.1 inches (155 mm)
- Range: 6 nautical miles (11 km; 6.9 mi)
- Characteristic: Fl W 6s
- Lubec Channel Light Station
- U.S. National Register of Historic Places
- Nearest city: Lubec, Maine
- Area: less than one acre
- Architect: US Army Corps of Engineers
- MPS: Light Stations of Maine MPS
- NRHP reference No.: 88000152
- Added to NRHP: March 14, 1988

Lubec Channel Light is a sparkplug lighthouse in Lubec, Maine. Established in 1890, it is one of three surviving sparkplug lights in the state, and served as an important aid to navigation on the route from the Bay of Fundy to Eastport, Maine and the St. Croix River It is set in shallow waters in the Lubec Channel, about 500 feet (150 m) from the Canada–United States border. The lighthouse was listed on the National Register of Historic Places as Lubec Channel Light Station on March 14, 1988. The lighthouse was sold by auction into private hands on 2007.

== Description and history ==
The town of Lubec is located in far eastern Maine, standing across the international border from Canada's Campobello Island. The Lubec Narrows passes between the two, which are joined by the Franklin Delano Roosevelt Bridge. South of the bridge lies a shallow bay, which opens into the Gulf of Maine after passing West Quoddy Head Light. In the 1880s a channel was dredged through the shallows to facilitate seagoing commerce from the port communities of Lubec, Eastport and Calais. An 1883 report recommended installation of a light on the channel to aid navigation, funding was authorized in 1888, and the light went into operation in 1890. It was automated in 1939.

The light is set to on the west side of the channel, and is mounted on a concrete foundation set in the muddy channel bottom. Its lower stage is a cast-iron round base, which flares out to support a wide deck. Originally sheltered by a shed roof, this deck is now exposed. The tower's second stage rises above, with a railing around its top, and a narrow third stage which supports the lantern house, also surrounded by a deck and railing. The lantern house is crowned by a spherical ventilator. The lantern stands 53 feet (16 m) above Mean High Water.

== See also ==
- National Register of Historic Places listings in Washington County, Maine
