= Anna L. Alline =

American nurse educator

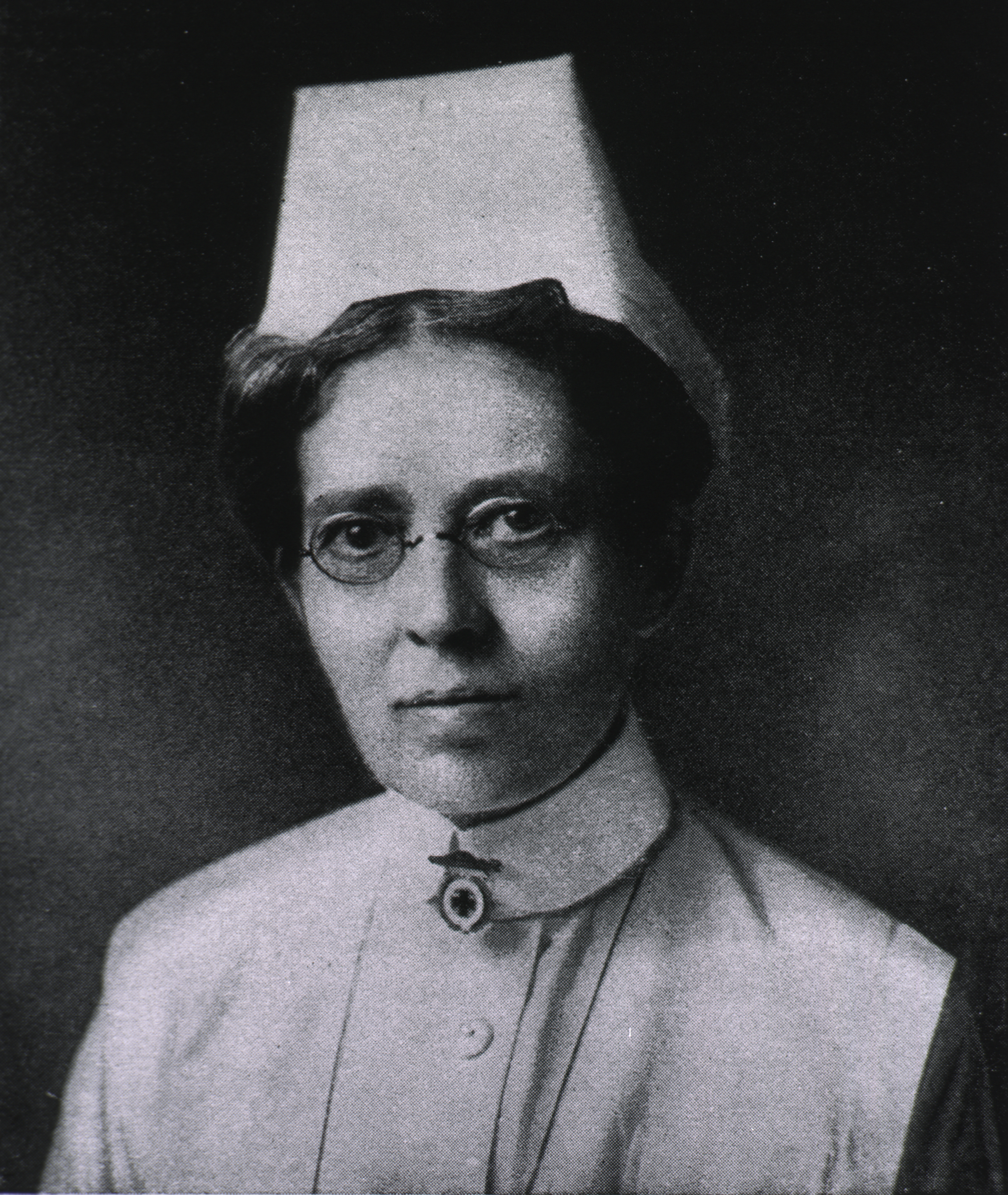
- Alline in 1923
- Born: Anna Lowell Alline; December 31, 1864; East Machias, Maine, U.S.
- Died: December 16, 1934 (aged 69); Ottumwa, Iowa, U.S.
- Other names: Anna Lowell Brown
- Occupations: Nurse, nursing school superintendent

Anna Lowell Alline (December 31, 1864 – December 16, 1934) was an American nurse, nurse educator, and inspector of nursing schools in New York State.

== Early life and education ==
Alline was born in East Machias, Maine, and raised in Iowa, the daughter of Henry Wadsworth Alline and Sarah Stearns Keller Alline. She graduated from the Homeopathic Hospital Training School for Nurses in Brooklyn in 1893, and was one of the first students in the Hospital Economics program at Teachers College, Columbia University.

== Career ==
Alline was a school teacher for several years before training to be a nurse. She taught hospital economics at Teachers College, Columbia University. She was treasurer of the American Society of Superintendents of Training Schools for Nurses from 1900 to 1909, She was elected president of the Associated Alumnae of the Brooklyn Training Schools for Nurses in 1897. She was a vice-president and inspector of training schools with the New York State Nurses' Association. She was superintendent of nursing at Buffalo Homeopathic Hospital from 1910 to 1912, and worked at a hospital in Albany in 1918 to 1923.

== Publications ==
- "Training-School Libraries" (1905)
- "Course in Hospital Economics" (1906, with Jeanie M. Campbell)
- "The Supply and Demand of Students in the Nurse Training-Schools" (1907)
- "Report on Inspection of Nurse Training Schools, for the year ending July 31, 1908" (1908)
- "State Supervision of Nursing Schools in New York" (1909)
- "The Education of Nurses. The Function of the Hospital" (1910)

== Personal life ==
Alline married widowed physician Elisha Wilton Brown in December 1924, and retired to Addison, Maine. Her husband died in June 1925. She died in 1934, at her brother's farm in Ottumwa, Iowa, at the age of 69.
