= Frederic Talbot =

American businessman (1819-1907)

Frederic Hovey Talbot (February 26, 1819 - December 20, 1907) was an American businessman, and one of the founders of the Pope & Talbot, Inc. lumber company.

He was born in East Machias, Maine, the son of Peter Talbot III and Eliza Chaloner. He attended Washington Academy. His family had been in the lumber business for generations, and some of their papers are held by the University of Maine.

In 1849, he travelled to San Francisco to form a business with Andrew J. Pope, whom he had known from childhood. In addition to lumber, he was involved in ship lighterage. He sold a cargo of lumber in Sacramento, and left California in 1850. After his departure from California, he was in business in New York City and in Providence, Rhode Island.

He was a member of Central Congregational Church in Providence, where he was a member of the committee that decided on the church's relocation from Benefit Street to Angell Street. He was also a member of the Rhode Island Historical Society.

He is buried in Swan Point Cemetery.
