= Albert Brewer Guptill =

American lawyer

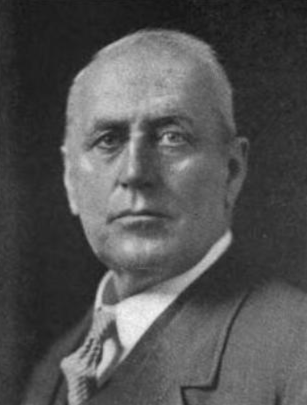
- Born: May 26, 1854; Lubec, Maine
- Died: January 8, 1931 (aged 76); Fargo, North Dakota
- Occupation(s): Writer, photographer

Albert Brewer Guptill (May 26, 1854 – January 8, 1931) was an author and photographer. He authored a book about the region traversed by the Northern Pacific Railway in 1891 and a field guide to Yellowstone with photo illustrations by Frank Jay Haynes.

Guptill was born in Lubec, Maine. In 1875 he became principal of schools in Zumbrota, Minnesota. In 1877 he became a lawyer in the District Court of Red Wing, Minnesota before settling in Fargo, North Dakota.

In 1891 his A Ramble in Wonderland-A Description of the Marvelous Region Traversed by the Northern Pacific Railroad was published and in 1894 his Yellowstone Park Guide: A Practical Hand-book Containing Accurate and Concise Descriptions of the Entire Park Region, Maps, Distances, Altitudes, Geyser Time Tables and All Necessary Information was published. It was "profusely illustrated" by Frank Jay Haynes, official photographer of the Northern Pacific Railway. The guide to Yellowstone became known as the Haynes Guide and continued in print for decades.

In 1898 he was reported to be the Secretary of the Republican Committee in North Dakota. Also in 1898, he left for the Klondike region and established an address in Dawson, Yukon Territory. He was a Scottish Rite Freemason.

Guptill died from heart disease in Fargo on January 8, 1931.

== Works ==
- Guptill, Albert B. (1891). A Ramble in Wonderland-A Description of the Marvelous Region Traversed by the Northern Pacific Railroad. Illustrated from photos by F. Jay Haynes. St Paul, MN: Charles F. Fee.
- Guptill, A. B. (1894). Yellowstone Park Guide-A Practical Handbook. Illustrated by F. Jay Haynes. St Paul, MN: F. Jay Haynes.
