= Shead High School =

Location
- 89 High Street; Eastport, Maine 04631; United States; 44.90750°N 66.98914°W

Information
- Former name: Shead Memorial High School
- Type: Public
- Motto: We Make It Personal
- Established: 1918
- School district: Eastport Public Schools
- Principal: Melissa Mitchell
- Grades: 9–12
- Enrollment: 99
- Student to teacher ratio: 9:1
- Language: English
- Campus type: Rural
- Colors: Orange and black
- Mascot: Tiger
- Team name: Shead Tigers
- Communities served: Eastport
- Website: http://www.shead.org

Shead High School is a public high school in Eastport, Maine. The original Shead Memorial High School was dedicated in 1918 and that building lasted until 1980, when it was destroyed and the new building was completed. Shead was named to the 2009 "America's Best High Schools" list by U.S. News & World Report.

After the high school in Lubec (the high school component of Lubec Consolidated School) closed in 2010, this school took some Lubec students.

== Athletics ==
Shead High School offers Baseball, Basketball, Cross Country, Golf, Soccer, Softball, and Tennis.
