= Martha Seavey Hoyt =

American writer, newspaper correspondent, businesswoman (1844–1915)

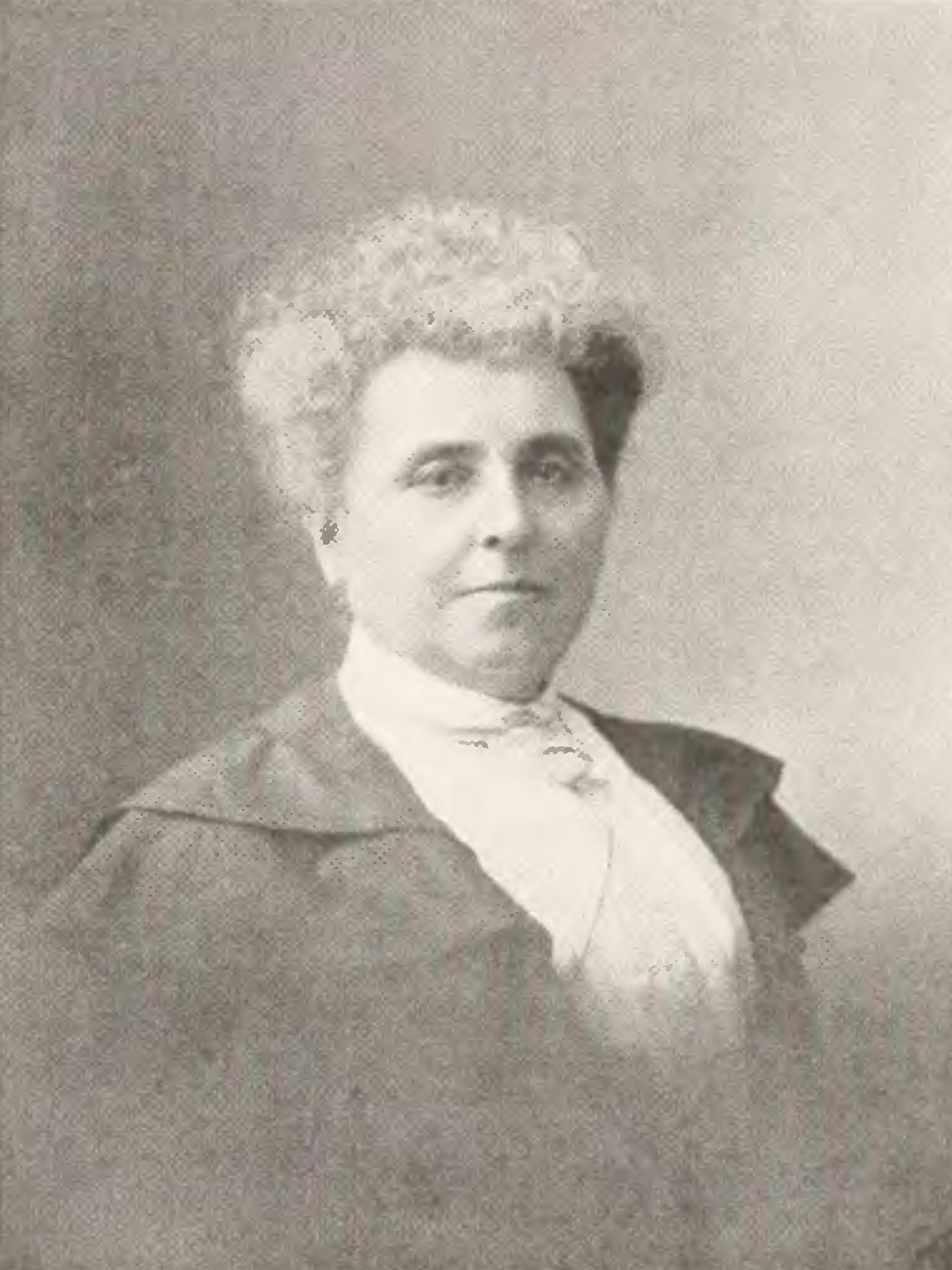
- Born: Martha O'Brien Seavey; July 4, 1844; East Machias, Maine, U.S.
- Died: June 15, 1915 (aged 70); Boston, Massachusetts, U.S.
- Occupations: biographer; newspaper correspondent; businesswoman
- Spouse: Gilman Allen Hoyt (m. 1866; died 1870)

Martha Seavey Hoyt (1844–1915) was an American biographer, newspaper correspondent, and businesswoman, active in real estate and in the insurance industry. She served as a Massachusetts State special commissioner, U.S. pension attorney, and representative of the Federation Bulletin.

== Early life and education ==
Martha O'Brien Seavey was born in East Machias, Maine, July 4, 1844. For three generations, she descended from New England ancestry. Her parents were Sylvanus (1794–1880) and Cynthia (0'Brien) Seavey (1800–1891). Her father was a temperance reformer and an early abolitionist. Martha had seven older siblings: Lucinda, Drusilla, John, Cynthia, Seth, Julia, and Emma.

Hoyt was educated in her home town at Washington Academy, graduating in 1865.

== Career ==
On September 22, 1866, in East Machias, she married Rev. Gilman Allen Hoyt (1840–1870), a Congregationalist. Immediately starting in their new field of work, they spent a year in Missouri and three more on the prairies of Kansas, Mrs. Hoyt being employed by the American Home Missionary Society at Warrensburg, Missouri and Hiawatha, Kansas. Rev. Hoyt died at Hiawatha, 1870.

Widowed, Hoyt decided to try something new and relocated to Boston, Massachusetts. Here she found pleasant work in one of the prominent newspaper offices. After her father's death, she returned to her childhood home to care for her mother and an infirm sister. There, she enjoyed spending time with her numerous friends and participating in the evening readings, with their pastor, the Rev. Henry Fisk Harding, as their guest, in which Browning was the favorite author.

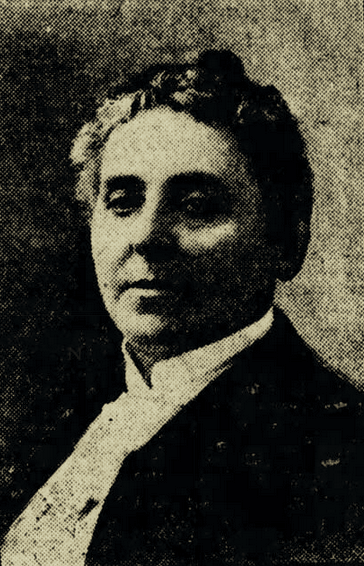
(1901)

After the need for her to be at home had passed, Hoyt returned to Boston, making it her permanent residence. She resumed her work in a larger sphere of public functions and responsibilities. She was appointed special commissioner by Governor Roger Wolcott. Being interested in working for the Civil War soldiers and soldiers' widows, she applied to the Bureau of Pensions in Washington, D.C. for authority to do all pension work, and, being able to fulfill all the requirements, was soon appointed pension attorney, an office granted to very few women. In this work, Hoyt was able to help widows.

At the request of several owners of property, Hoyt became a real estate dealer and agent who for many years, was a prominent operator in the industry. She also compiled biographies for a publishing company, and was a correspondent for several newspapers. Later, in addition to her other work, Hoyt signed a contract with the Mutual Life Insurance Company of New York, and became a representative in the Boston office, working more particularly on the line of Gold Bond and Annuity investments, which became popular with women. As a pension claim agent, she was the only woman authorized to execute pension vouchers in Boston and vicinity.

Hoyt was a member of the Boston Business League, the Massachusetts Woman Suffrage Association, the Women's Educational and Industrial Union, and the Underwriters' Association of Boston.

== Death ==
Martha Seavey Hoyt died in Boston, June 15, 1915.

== Selected works ==
- Sketches of Representative Women of New England, compiled by Mary Elvira Elliot, Mary A. Stimpson, Martha Seavey Hoyt, and others, under the editorial supervision of Julia Ward Howe, assisted by Mary H. Graves (Boston, New England Historical Publishing Company, 1904)
