= Washington Academy (Maine) =

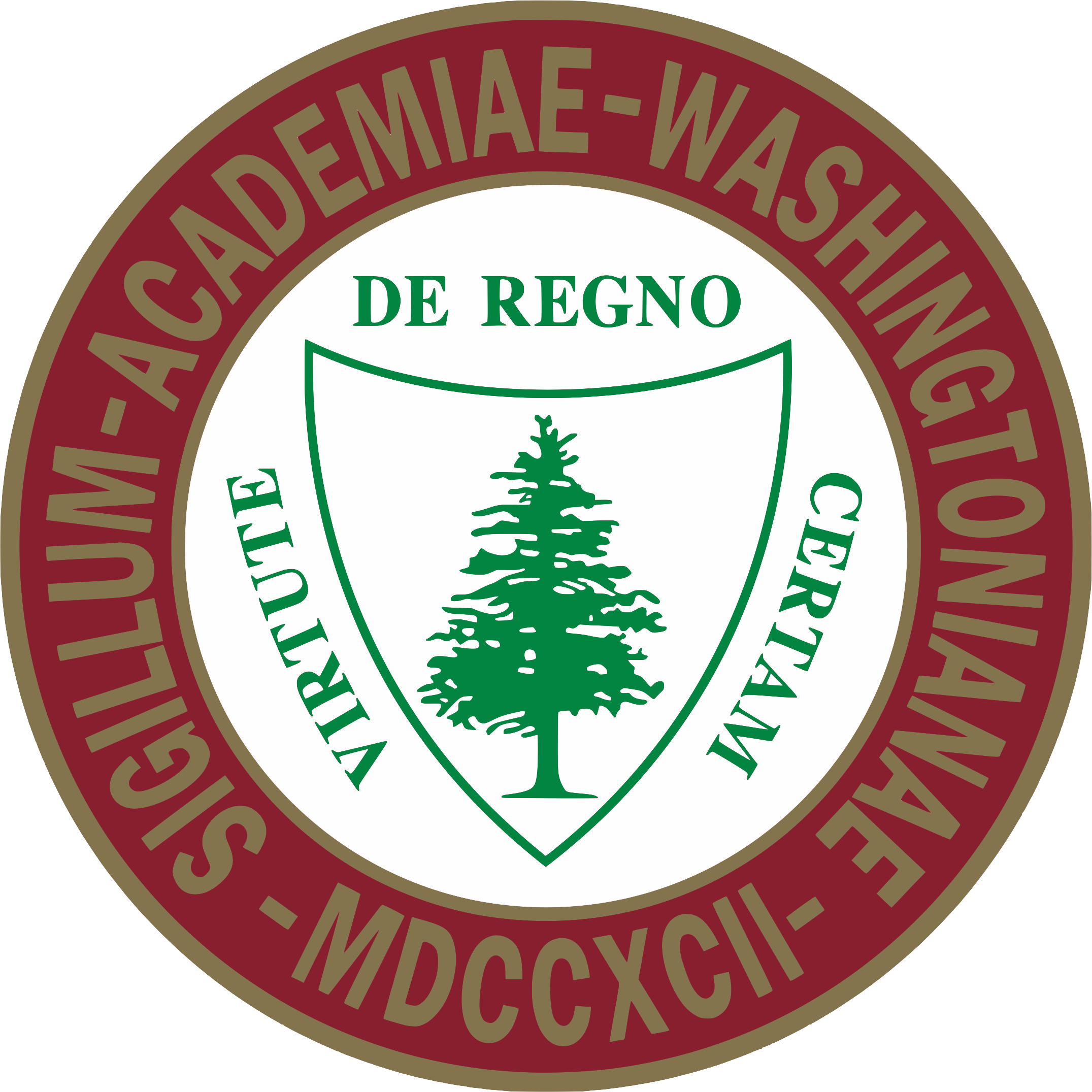

Location
- 66 Cutler Road; East Machias, Maine 04630; United States; 44°44′03″N 67°23′19″W

Information
- School type: Private, boarding
- Motto: Virtute de Regno Certam (The Virtue of the Kingdom is Certain)
- Founded: 1792; 234 years ago
- Head of school: Judson McBrine
- Grades: 9-12
- Enrollment: 392
- Student to teacher ratio: 10:1
- Campus type: Rural
- Colors: Maroon; White
- Mascot: Raider
- Nickname: Raiders
- Accreditation: New England Association of Schools and Colleges
- Publication: WA Today
- Yearbook: The Washington Record
- Tuition: $40,500
- Website: washingtonacademy.org

Washington Academy (WA) is a private preparatory high school in East Machias, Maine. Founded in 1792, the Academy has an enrollment of 438 boarding and day students.

The Maine Department of Education pays the school to take high school students from the unorganized territories of Cathance, Edmunds, Marion, and Trescott in Washington County. Students in other parts of Washington County may elect to attend as public school students. Due to the school taking public tuition money, Joyce Kryszak of the Maine Monitor stated that it is a "public-private" school.

== History ==
In the beginning, classes were held in Machias at the Burnham Tavern and the Masonic Hall. It wasn’t until much later that the school got its own building. After deliberation between neighboring towns, the first school building was built in East Machias, opening its doors on September 8, 1823.

Washington Academy is co-educational with about 50% of each gender. It has over 350 day students and about 90 residential students- representing more than 20 surrounding communities. In 2017, the school had 96 international students from 24 countries.

After the high school in Lubec (the high school component of Lubec Consolidated School) closed in 2010, this school took some Lubec students. The academy had, in the period prior to the closure of Lubec High, given scholarships to some Lubec students.

Washington Academy completed construction a new Health and Wellness Center, and improvements in athletic fields, classroom space, and digital infrastructure in 2011.

== Washington Academy Dual Diploma Program ==
Washington Academy takes part in the Dual Diploma Program (an American high school program that allows international students to earn a U.S. high school diploma alongside their national diploma by taking online classes.)

- Accredited in the U.S.
- Typically involves 6 online U.S. courses.
- Offers a way to improve English, access American education, and boost university applications.

It parteners with organizations like JEVlangue to offer the Dual Diploma Program in different countries.

== Notable alumni ==
- John C. Caldwell, American Civil War general and diplomat
- Austin Cary, forester
- George S. Grimmer, Canadian politician
- Alexander Hamilton Handy, judge
- George Harris, theologian
- Martha Seavey Hoyt, biographer, newspaper correspondent, businesswoman
- Frederick A. Pike, politician
- James Savage, banker
- Alfred Stone, architect
- Frederic Talbot, businessman

== See also ==
- Education in Maine

Other private high schools in Maine which take students with public funds (from unorganized areas and/or with agreements with school districts):

- Foxcroft Academy
- Lee Academy
- Waynflete School

Connecticut private academies acting as public high schools:

- Gilbert School
- Norwich Free Academy
- Woodstock Academy

New Hampshire private academies acting as public high schools:

- Coe-Brown Northwood Academy
- Pinkerton Academy
