= Jefferson Substation =

Historic building in Portland, Oregon, U.S.

- Formerly listed on the U.S. National Register of Historic Places
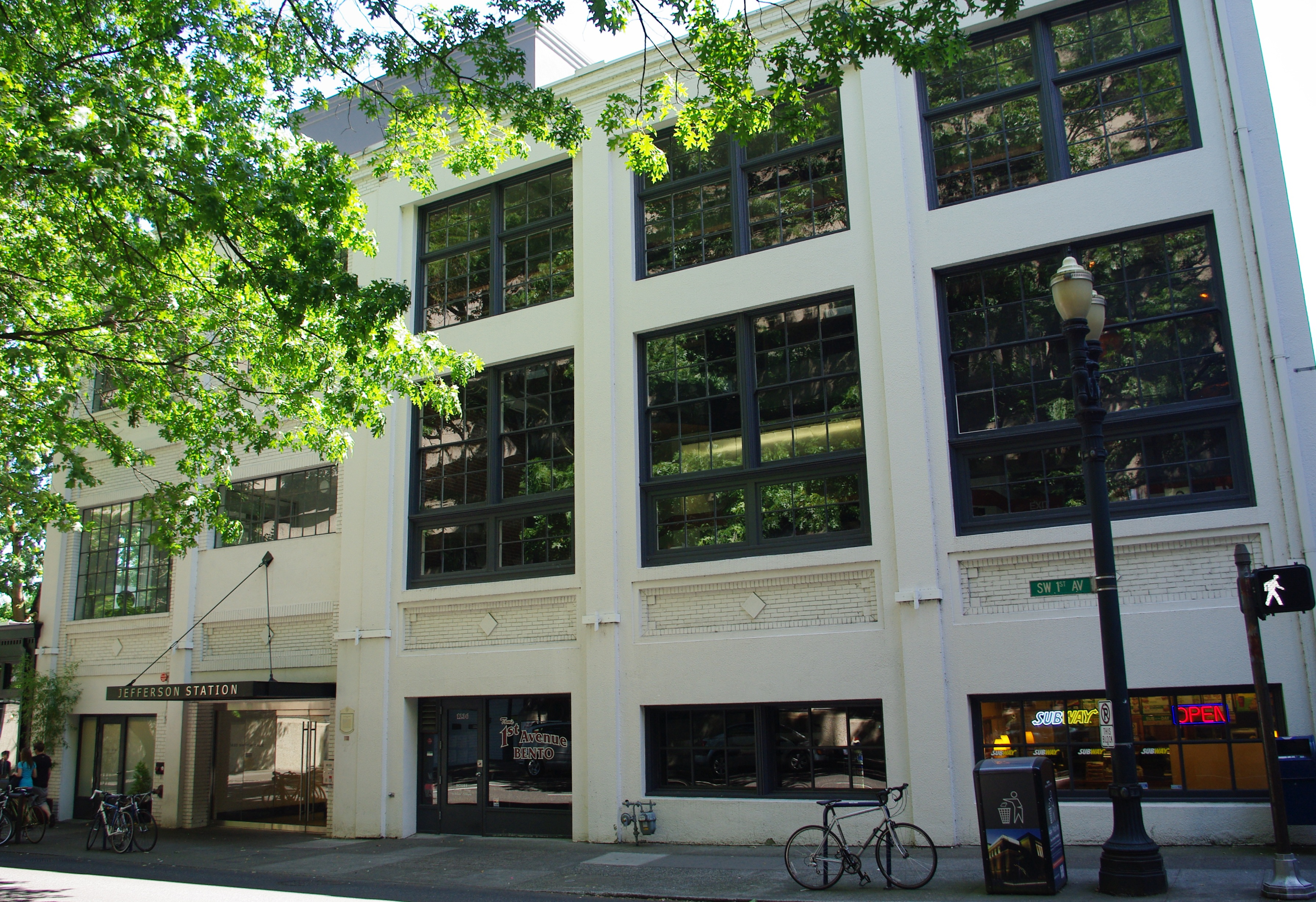

- Location within Portland, Oregon Location within Oregon Location within the United States
- Location: 37 SW Jefferson Street; Portland, Oregon
- Coordinates: 45°30′50″N 122°40′31″W
- Built: 1909
- Architect: Hurley Mason Co.
- NRHP reference No.: 80003368

Significant dates
- Added to NRHP: May 31, 1980
- Removed from NRHP: April 5, 2021

The Jefferson Station, formerly known as the Jefferson Substation, is a building located in downtown Portland, Oregon, that was once listed on the National Register of Historic Places.

== History ==
Designed by Trussed Concrete Steel Co and built in 1909 by Hurley Madison Co of Tacoma & Portland, the Jefferson Station served as an electrical substation for Portland General Electric.

== Use ==
The ground floor of the Jefferson Station was formerly occupied by restaurants such as Subway, Veritable Quandary (VQ) and Tom's First Avenue Bento. The building was also occupied by Turtledove Clemens, an integrated marketing communications firm which also houses Propel Businessworks, Urban Works Real Estate, a retail brokerage company, Sloy, Dahl & Holst, Inc., a money management firm, TYR Wood Products, a hardwood export company, and Quixote Investment, a financial planning company.

From 2016 to 2020, the Jefferson Station was converted to house courtrooms, then integrated into the newly constructed Multnomah County Central Courthouse adjacent to the building. The renovation and seismic retrofit preserved the building's original 1909 facades as well as a 20-ton crane above the second floor.

== See also ==
- National Register of Historic Places listings in Southwest Portland, Oregon
