= Lubec, Maine =

- Town
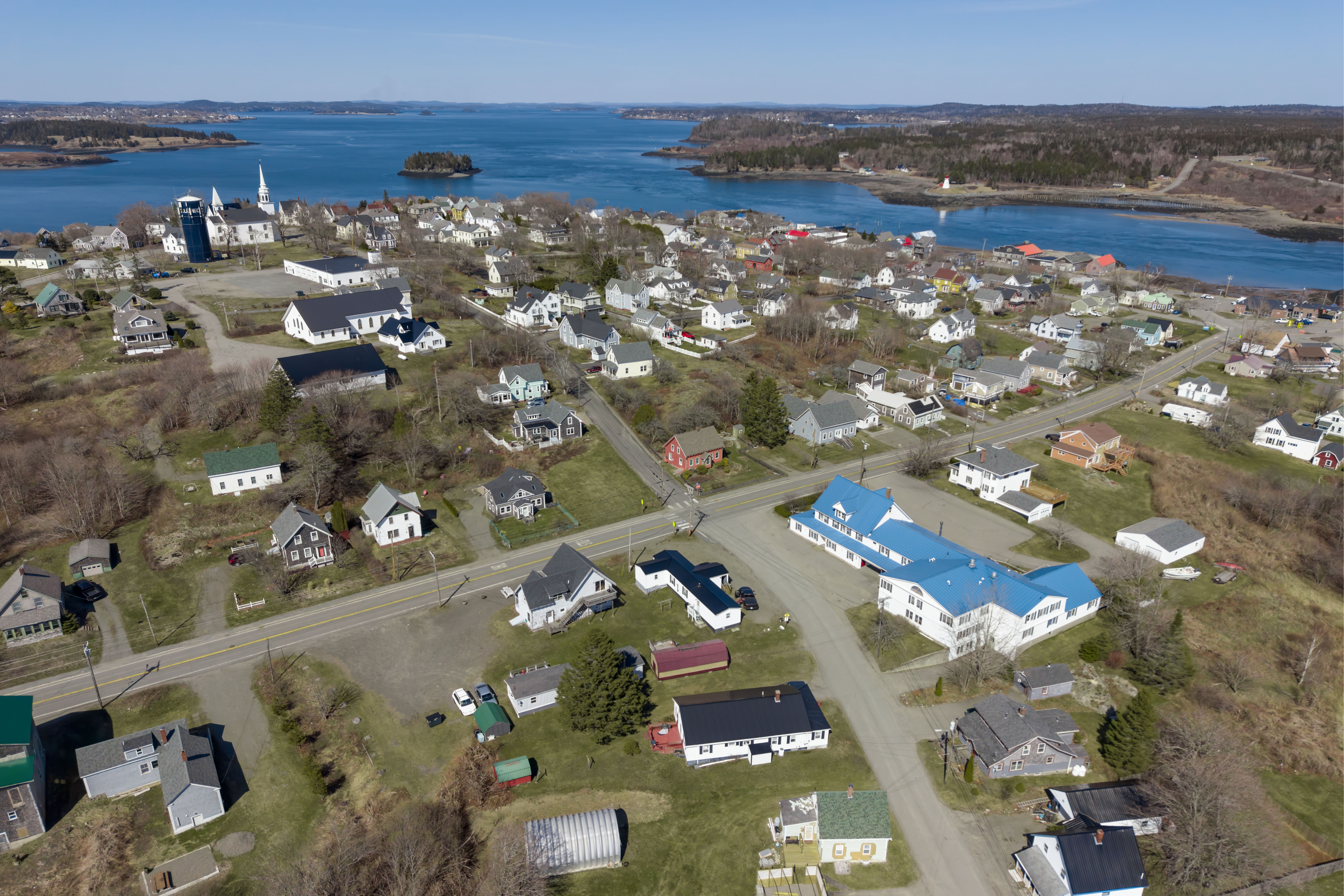
- Aerial view of Lubec

- Flag

- Location in the state of Maine Lubec (the United States)
- Coordinates: 44°49′20″N 67°00′56″W
- Country: United States
- State: Maine
- County: Washington
- Incorporated: 1811

Area
  - Total: 78.38 sq mi (203.00 km^{2})
  - Land: 33.25 sq mi (86.12 km^{2})
  - Water: 45.13 sq mi (116.89 km^{2})
- Elevation: 118 ft (36 m)

Population (2020)
  - Total: 1,237
  - Density: 37.2/sq mi (14.36/km^{2})
- Time zone: UTC-5 (Eastern (EST))
  - Summer (DST): UTC-4 (EDT)
- ZIP Code: 04652
- Area code: 207
- FIPS code: 23-41610
- GNIS feature ID: 582570
- Website: lubecme.gov

Lubec (/luːˈbɛk/ loo-BEK) is a town in Washington County, Maine, United States. It is the easternmost municipality in the contiguous U.S. (see extreme points of the United States) and is the country's closest continental location to Africa.

The town, with a population of 1,237 at the 2020 census, is home to Quoddy Head State Park.

== History ==
Located on a peninsula overlooking an ice-free harbor, the town was first settled about 1775. Originally part of Eastport, it was set off and incorporated on June 21, 1811, and named for Lübeck, Germany. In 1795, judge David Owen drew a map of the Passamaquoddy Bay, identifying old French settlements including one at Lubec.

Following the War of 1812, Lubec was the site of considerable smuggling trade in gypsum, although principal industries remained agriculture and fisheries. Captain Jabez Pike noted Lubec had been "founded on smuggling, and no one frowned on it except the government".

By 1859, there was a tannery, three gristmills and nine sawmills; by 1886, there were also two shipyards, three boatbuilders and three sailmakers.

From 1897 to 1898, the town was the site of a swindle in the sale of stock in the Electrolytic Marine Salts Company, the brainchild of Reverend Prescott Jernegan and Charles Fisher of Martha's Vineyard. Jernegan claimed to have developed a method of using "accumulators" to get gold from sea water, and bought an old grist mill to turn it into a factory. The scheme attracted an abundance of investors, who were all too eager to funnel money into the company after being promised astronomical returns. In the summer of 1898, work was suspended without explanation. Jernegan and Smith vanished, and the fraud was gleefully exposed by newspapers across New England.

Lubec reached its population peak in the 1910s and 1920s, hovering a little above 3,300. Since then, the population has generally been in a gradual but steady decline.

Before the year 2000 some area factory jobs disappeared. Meanwhile, Lubec's popularity increased with media outlets promoting it as a place to possibly see the start of the year 2000. Artists, persons with no children, and persons who were in older demographics moved to the community while families with children moved out. Real estate prices also rose. By 2010 many residents worked online.

As of 2020, its population had fallen to 1,237.

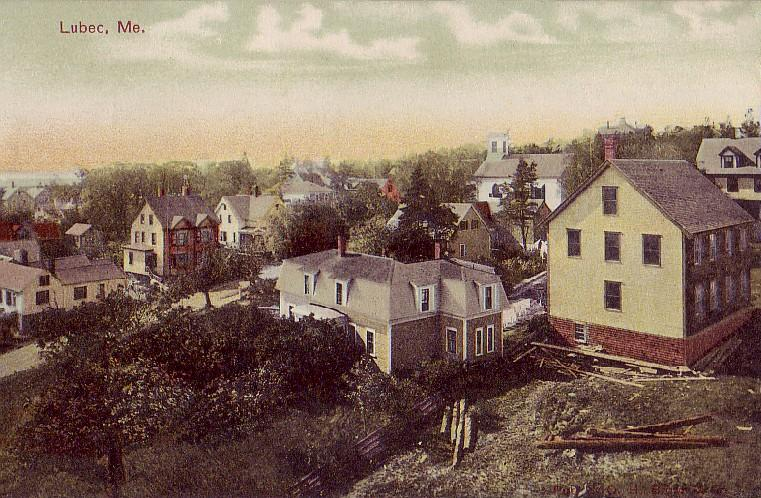
General view c. 1910

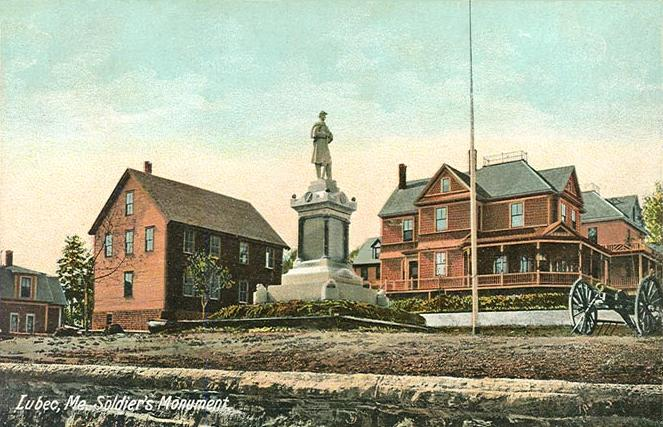
War monument in 1908

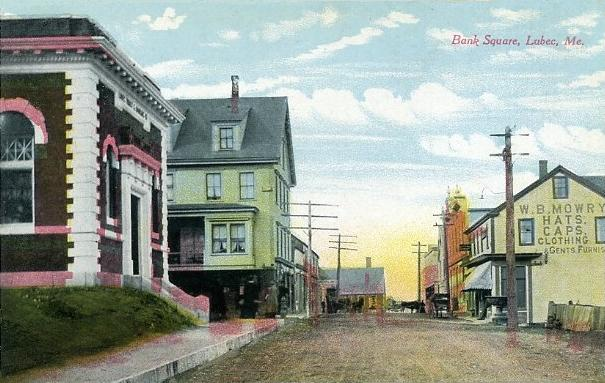
Bank Square c. 1908

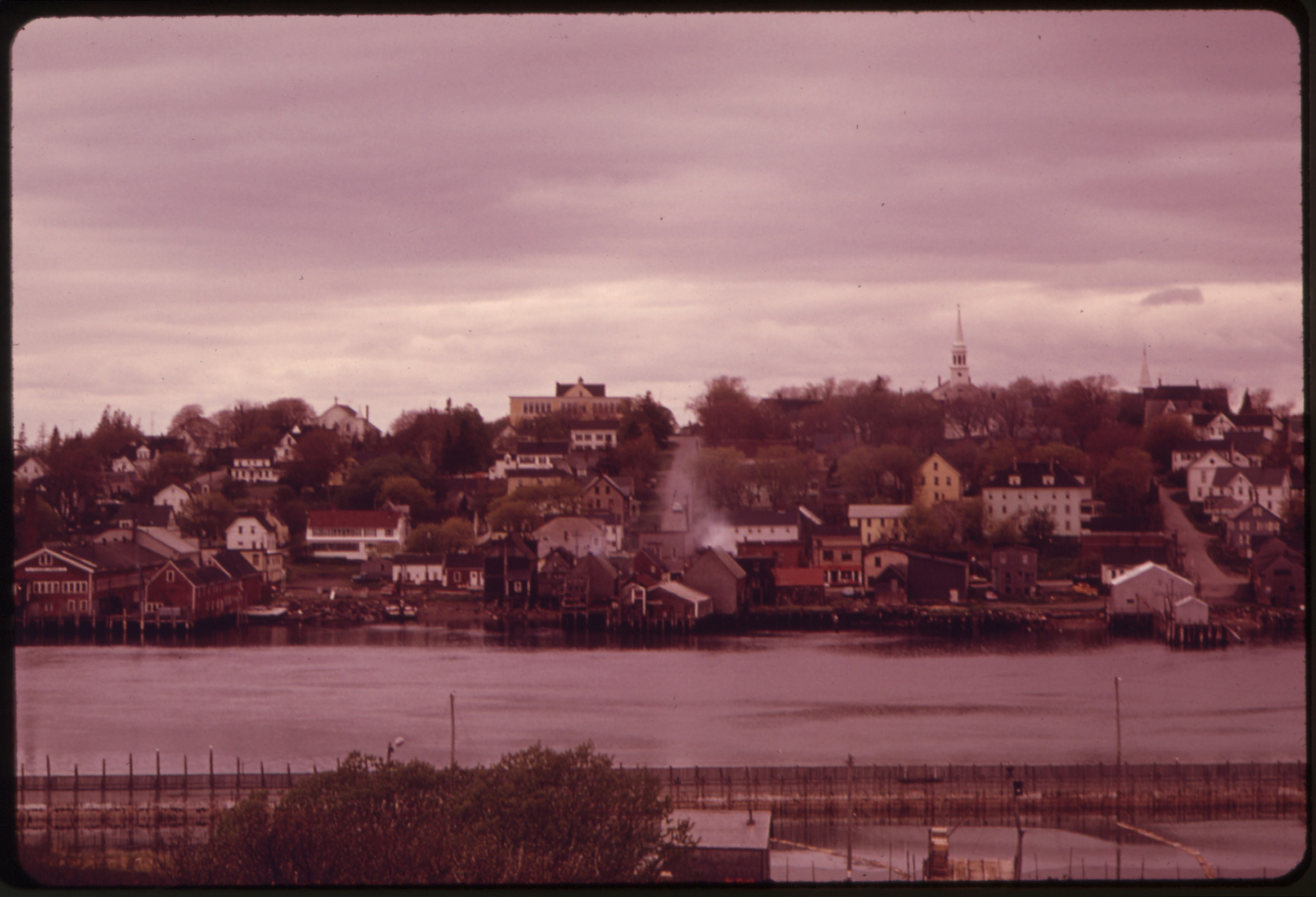
Lubec in 1973

== Geography ==
Lubec is located in northeastern Maine. According to the United States Census Bureau, the town has a total area of 78.38 square miles (203.00 km^{2}), of which 33.25 square miles (86.12 km^{2}) is land and 45.13 square miles (116.89 km^{2}) is water. Lubec is located on a peninsula in Passamaquoddy Bay, slightly south of Eastport. The West Quoddy Head is southeast.

Lubec is the easternmost town of the contiguous United States. West Quoddy Head in Lubec is the easternmost point in the contiguous United States, located at 44°48′54″N 66°57′1″W longitude. It is adjacent to the Quoddy Narrows, a narrow strait between Canada and the United States, one of the entrances into Passamaquoddy Bay. Since 1808, West Quoddy Head Lighthouse has been on the site to guide ships through this waterway. The present lighthouse with its distinctive red-and-white stripes was built in 1858.

Lubec is crossed by Maine State Route 189. The Franklin Delano Roosevelt Bridge connects the town to Campobello Island, New Brunswick, Canada.

=== Sites of interest ===
- Lubec Channel Light
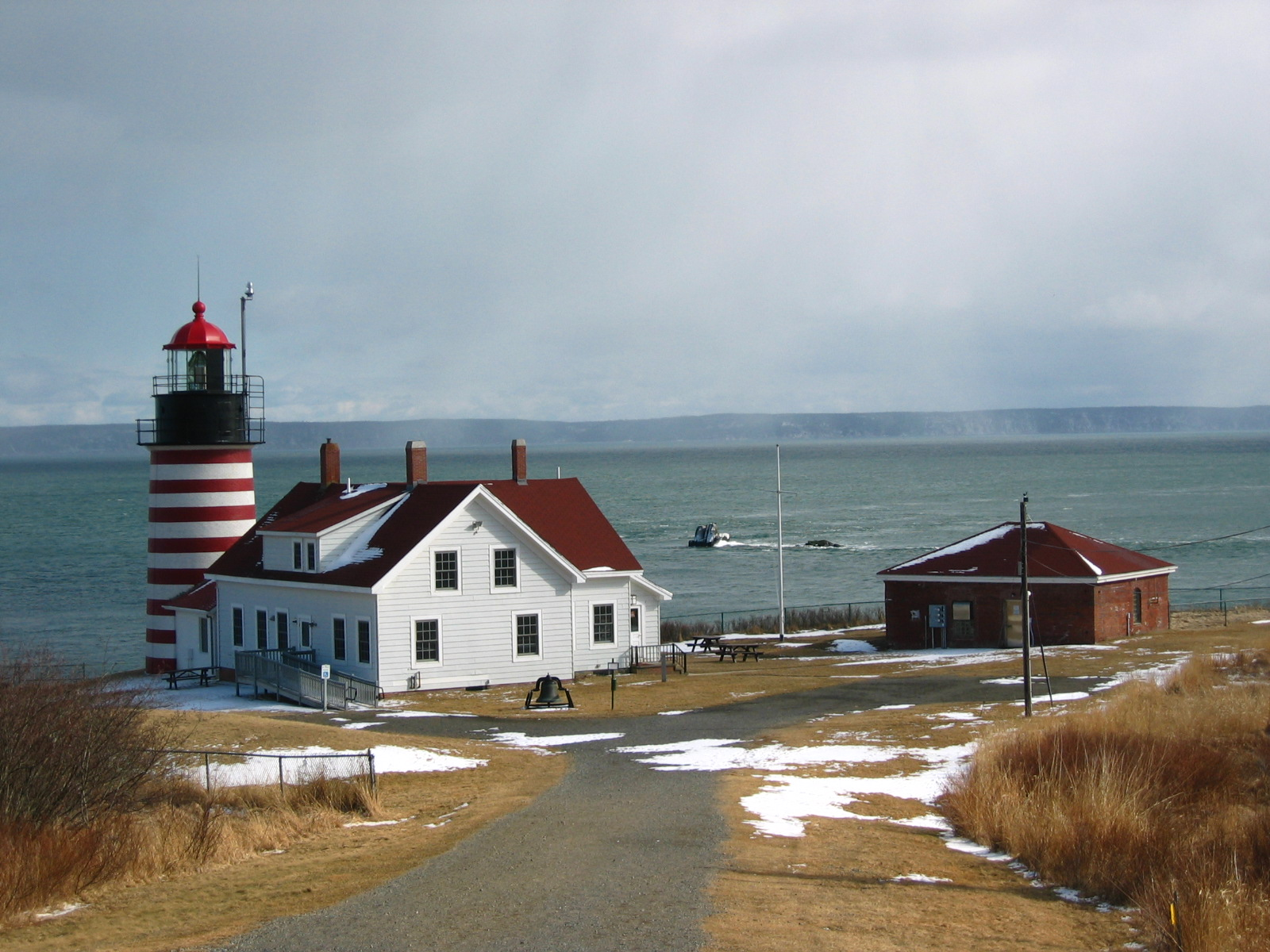
West Quoddy Head Lighthouse and Quoddy Narrows, with Grand Manan Island, Canada, in background

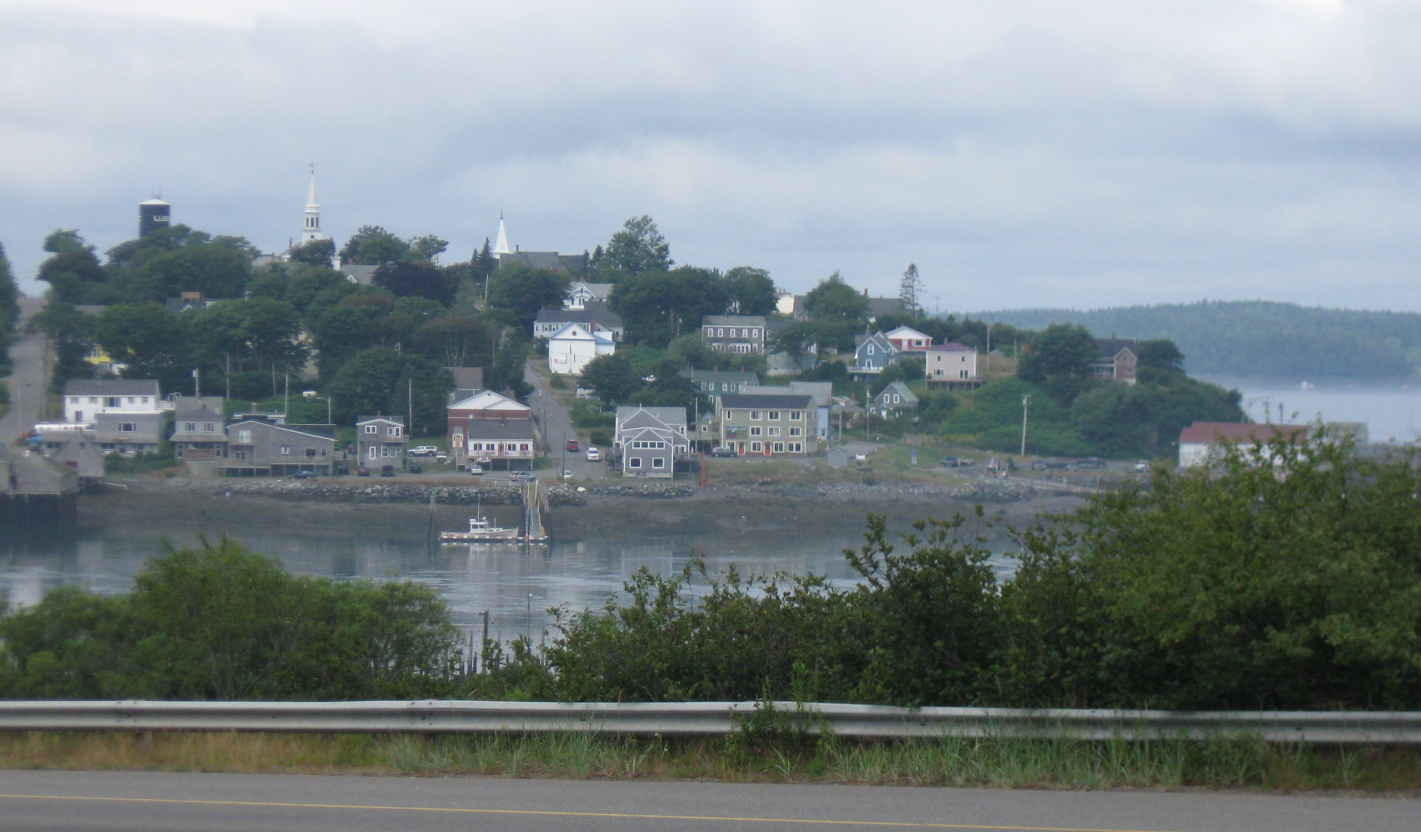
Center of Lubec as seen from Campobello Island

=== Climate ===
Lubec has a humid continental climate with mild summers and cold winters. Generally speaking, it is relatively cold for its coastline position at 44 degrees latitude, but milder in winter than nearby Machias due to moderate warming by the adjacent waters of the Atlantic. The climate is similar to that of nearby Eastport. The Weather Channel provides interpolated climate data based on nearby areas.

Climate data for Lubec, Maine
Month	Jan	Feb	Mar	Apr	May	Jun	Jul	Aug	Sep	Oct	Nov	Dec	Year
Record high °F (°C)	61 (16)	65 (18)	79 (26)	84 (29)	93 (34)	96 (36)	98 (37)	95 (35)	94 (34)	84 (29)	71 (22)	60 (16)	98 (37)
Mean daily maximum °F (°C)	30 (−1)	32 (0)	39 (4)	50 (10)	60 (16)	69 (21)	74 (23)	74 (23)	67 (19)	56 (13)	46 (8)	36 (2)	53 (12)
Daily mean °F (°C)	22 (−6)	25 (−4)	32 (0)	42 (6)	51 (11)	59 (15)	64 (18)	64 (18)	58 (14)	48 (9)	40 (4)	29 (−2)	45 (7)
Mean daily minimum °F (°C)	14 (−10)	17 (−8)	24 (−4)	34 (1)	41 (5)	48 (9)	54 (12)	54 (12)	49 (9)	40 (4)	33 (1)	21 (−6)	36 (2)
Record low °F (°C)	−27 (−33)	−23 (−31)	−13 (−25)	1 (−17)	24 (−4)	31 (−1)	36 (2)	33 (1)	23 (−5)	15 (−9)	3 (−16)	−23 (−31)	−27 (−33)
Average precipitation inches (mm)	3.83 (97)	3.24 (82)	4.07 (103)	3.67 (93)	3.77 (96)	3.66 (93)	2.98 (76)	3.10 (79)	4.11 (104)	4.37 (111)	4.87 (124)	4.27 (108)	45.94 (1,167)
Source: The Weather Channel

== Bay of Fundy International Marathon ==
The Bay of Fundy International Marathon is a marathon between Lubec and Campobello Island, New Brunswick, Canada. A 10K is also organized alongside the marathon. The 10K takes place entirely within Lubec.

The race begins at West Quoddy Head Lighthouse, which is the easternmost point in the United States. Runners cross the Franklin Delano Roosevelt Bridge connecting Maine to New Brunswick and run until they reach Head Harbour Lighthouse (East Quoddy Lighthouse), at which time the runners turn around and return to Lubec.

The first marathon was run in 2013. It included over 500 registered runners and was held in June. The race provided significant economic benefits to the area. The 2014 edition featured fewer runners (286 total). The organizers attributed the decrease to the "Boston effect", whereby marathon runners chose other marathons to run in order to qualify for the 2014 Boston Marathon.

== Demographics ==
Historical population
Census	Pop.	Note	%±
1820	1,430		—
1830	1,535		7.3%
1840	2,307		50.3%
1850	2,814		22.0%
1860	2,555		−9.2%
1870	2,136		−16.4%
1880	2,109		−1.3%
1890	2,769		31.3%
1900	3,005		8.5%
1910	3,363		11.9%
1920	3,371		0.2%
1930	2,994		−11.2%
1940	3,108		3.8%
1950	2,973		−4.3%
1960	2,684		−9.7%
1970	1,949		−27.4%
1980	2,045		4.9%
1990	1,853		−9.4%
2000	1,652		−10.8%
2010	1,359		−17.7%
2020	1,237		−9.0%
U.S. Decennial Census

As of 2000 the median income for a household in the town was $20,565, and the median income for a family was $26,098. Males had a median income of $25,170 versus $19,375 for females. The per capita income for the town was $13,081. About 20.3% of families and 28.8% of the population were below the poverty line, including 49.6% of those under age 18 and 20.6% of those age 65 or over.

=== 2010 census ===
As of the census of 2010, there were 1,359 people, 682 households, and 356 families residing in the town. The population density was 40.9 inhabitants per square mile (15.8/km^{2}). There were 1,147 housing units at an average density of 34.5 per square mile (13.3/km^{2}). The racial makeup of the town saw 97.7% White, 0.1% African American, 0.2% Native American, 0.3% Asian, 0.3% from other races, and 1.4% from two or more races. Hispanic or Latino of any race were 1.0% of the population.

There were 682 households, of which 16.9% had children under the age of 18 living with them, 39.4% were married couples living together, 8.7% had a female householder with no husband present, 4.1% had a male householder with no wife present, and 47.8% were non-families. Of all households 41.9% were made up of individuals, and 20.9% had someone living alone who was 65 years of age or older. The average household size was 1.94 and the average family size was 2.58.

The median age in the town was 54 years. 14.1% of residents were under the age of 18; 4.3% were between the ages of 18 and 24; 16.4% were from 25 to 44; 36.9% were from 45 to 64; and 28.3% were 65 years of age or older. The gender makeup of the town was 48.4% male and 51.6% female.

== Education ==
Lubec is in the Maine School Administrative District 19. As of 2012 Kenneth Johnson is the Superintendent of Schools. Lubec Consolidated School, a Pre-Kindergarten to Grade 8 School, belongs to that district. As required by law, the district pays for Lubec students to attend public or private high schools.

Previously Lubec had a high school program, which was in the same building as the elementary and middle school. The high school program ended in 2010, when it had 37 students. High schools taking Lubec students included Machias Memorial High School, Shead High School, and Washington Academy. The district and the city, seeing the commute across the Cobscook Bay to be possibly hazardous, chose not to authorize using a ferry to send students to Eastport High School.

== Notable people ==
- Myron Avery, lawyer, explorer
- James Henry Carleton, brevet major general in the U.S. Army
- Hazel Marion Eaton, daredevil, motordome thrill racer – one of the "mile a minute girls".
- Albert Brewer Guptill, author and photographer
- Sumner Pike, member of the US Securities Exchange Commission and the Atomic Energy Commission
- Doris Pike White, investment banker and president general of the Daughters of the American Revolution
- Hopley Yeaton, ship captain, considered the "Father of the US Coast Guard"

== Gallery ==
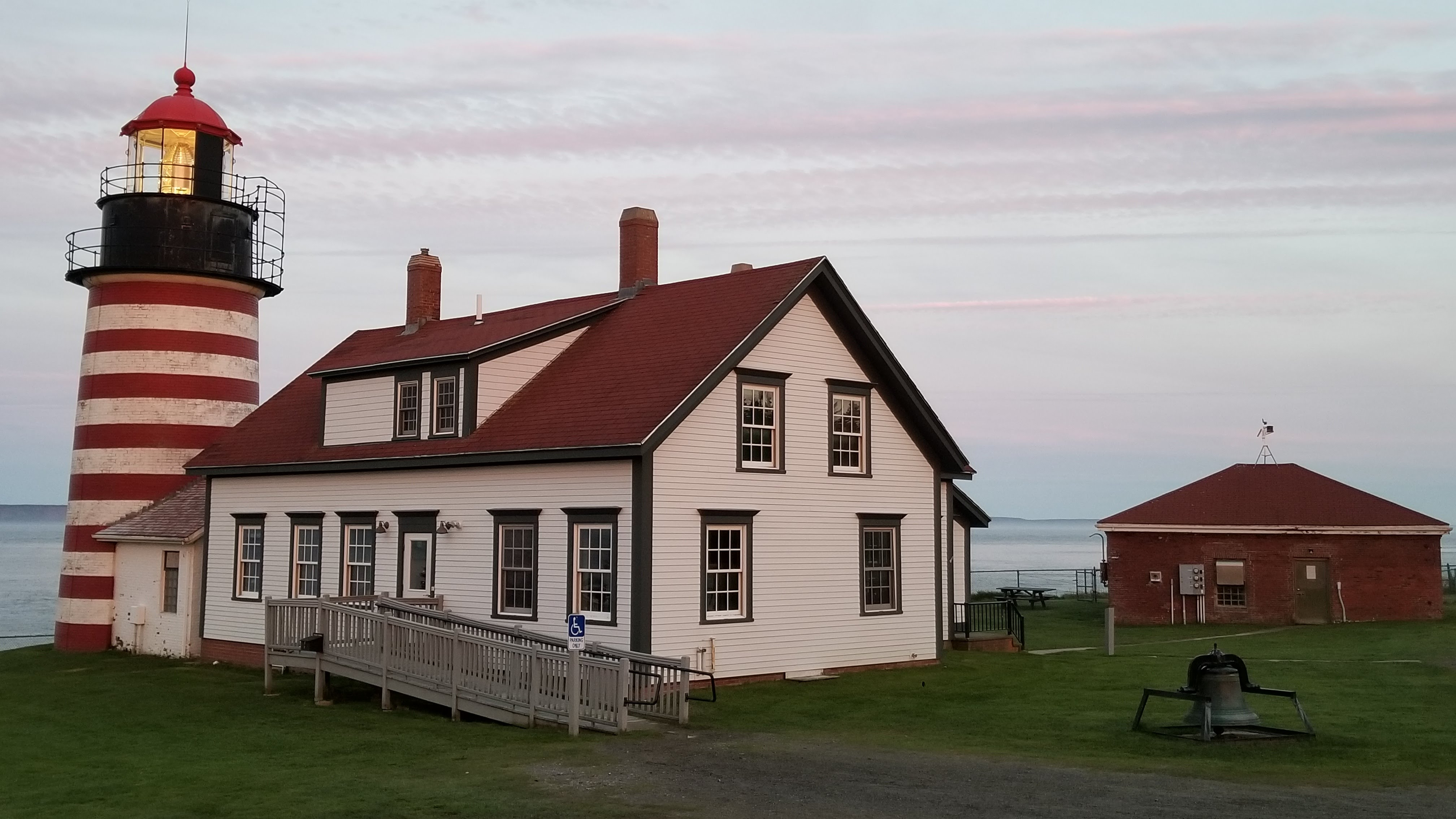
West Quoddy Head Lighthouse

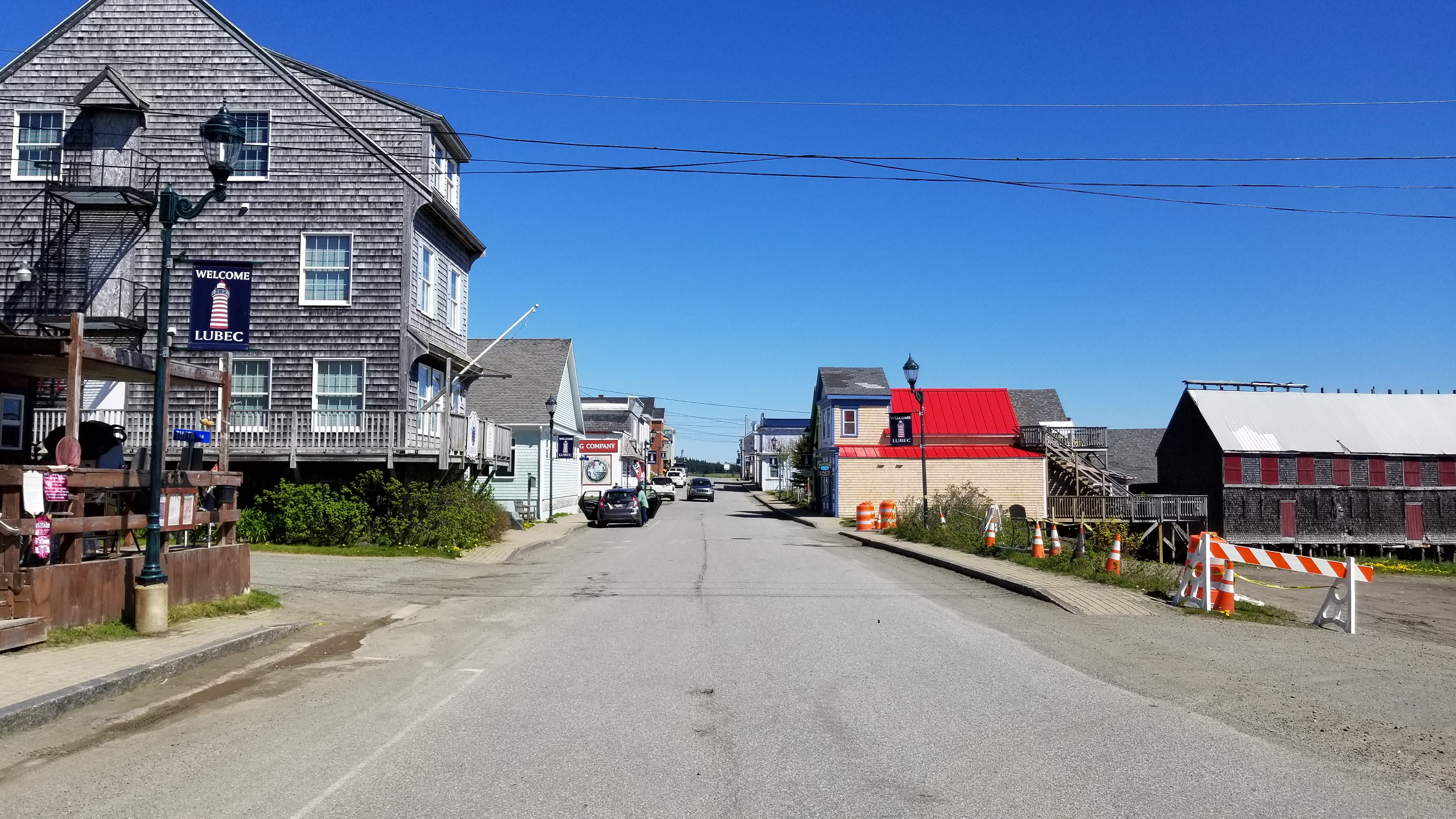
Lubec, Maine

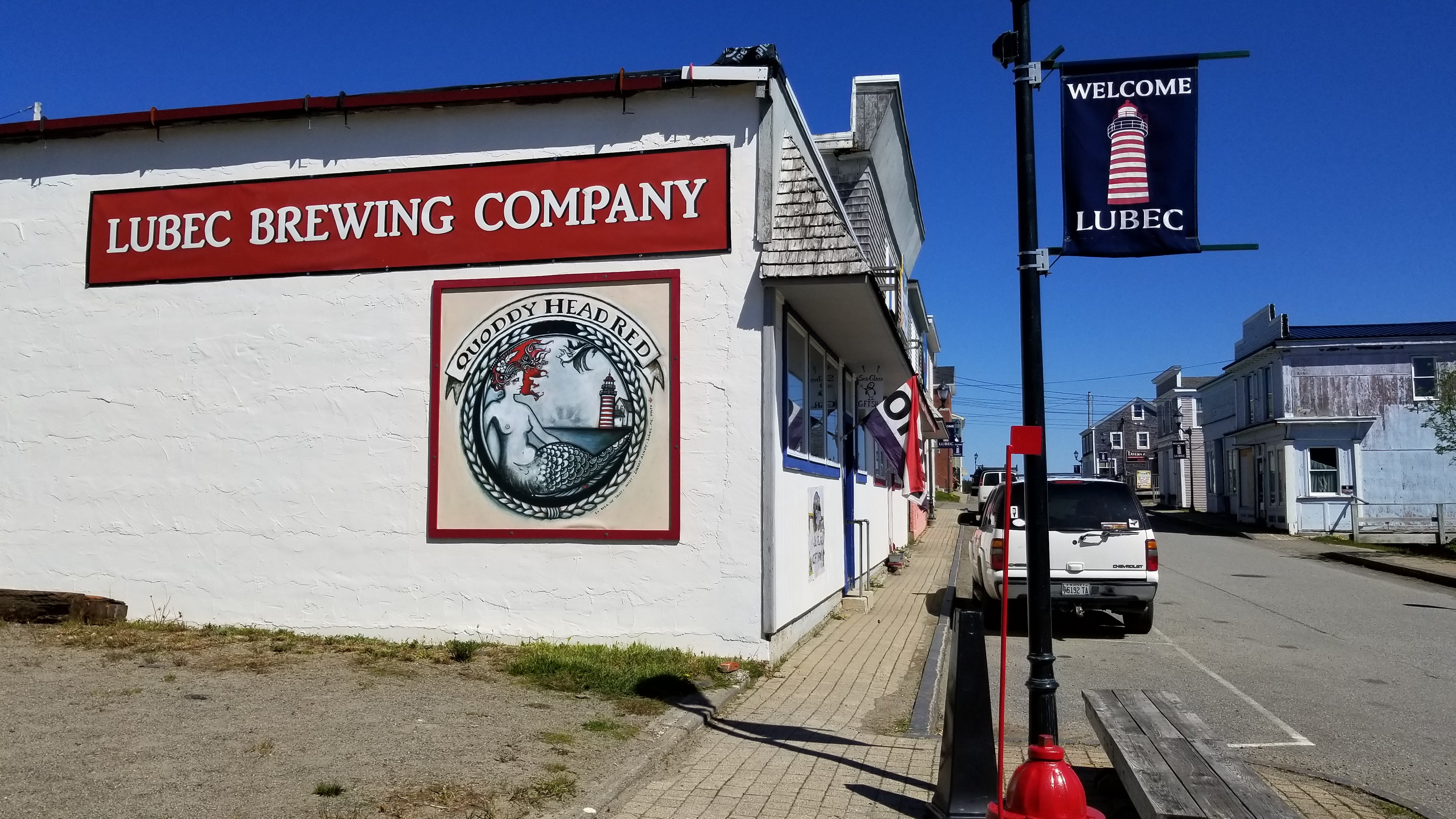
Lubec Brewing Company

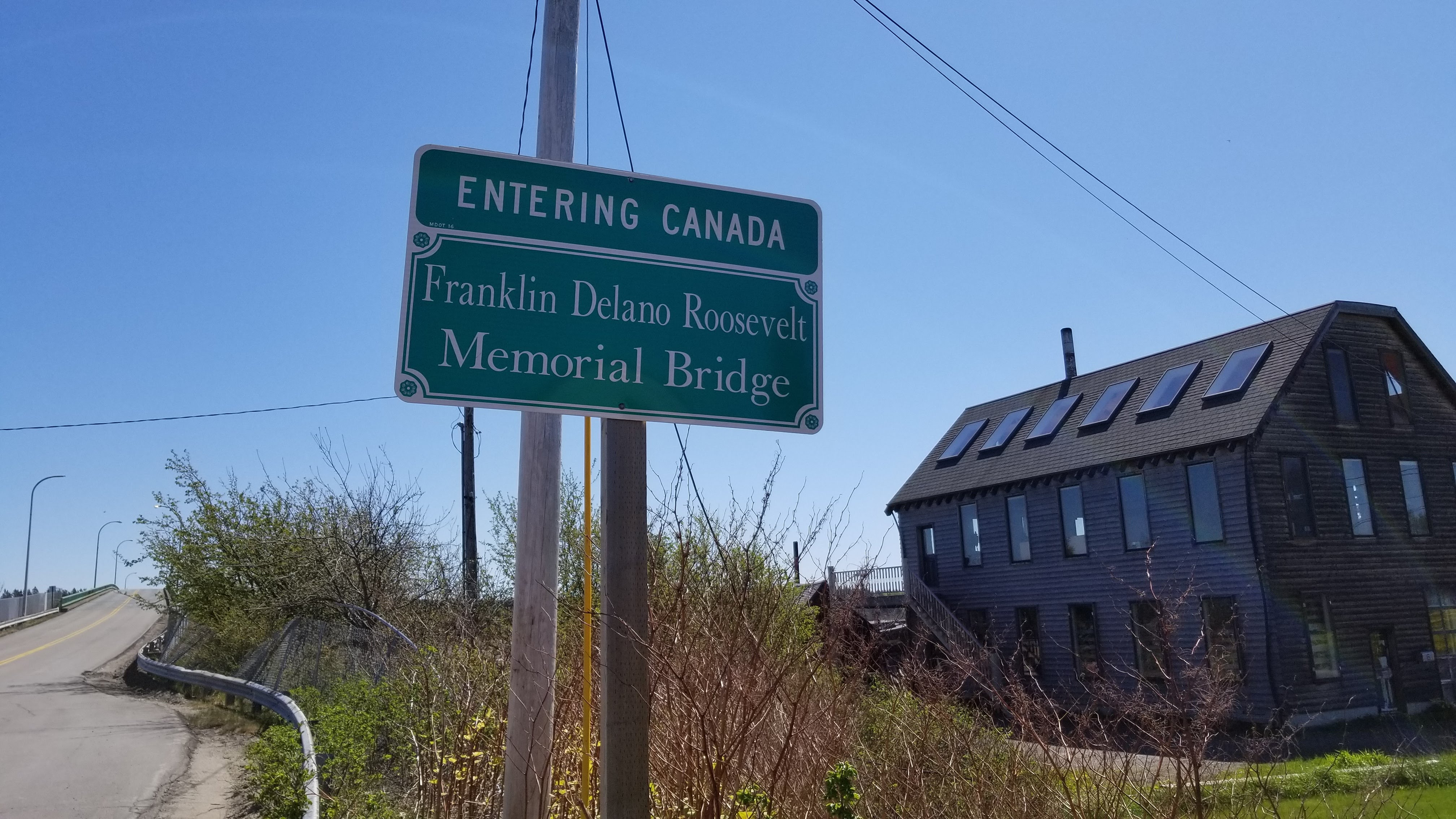
US-Canada Border in Lubec

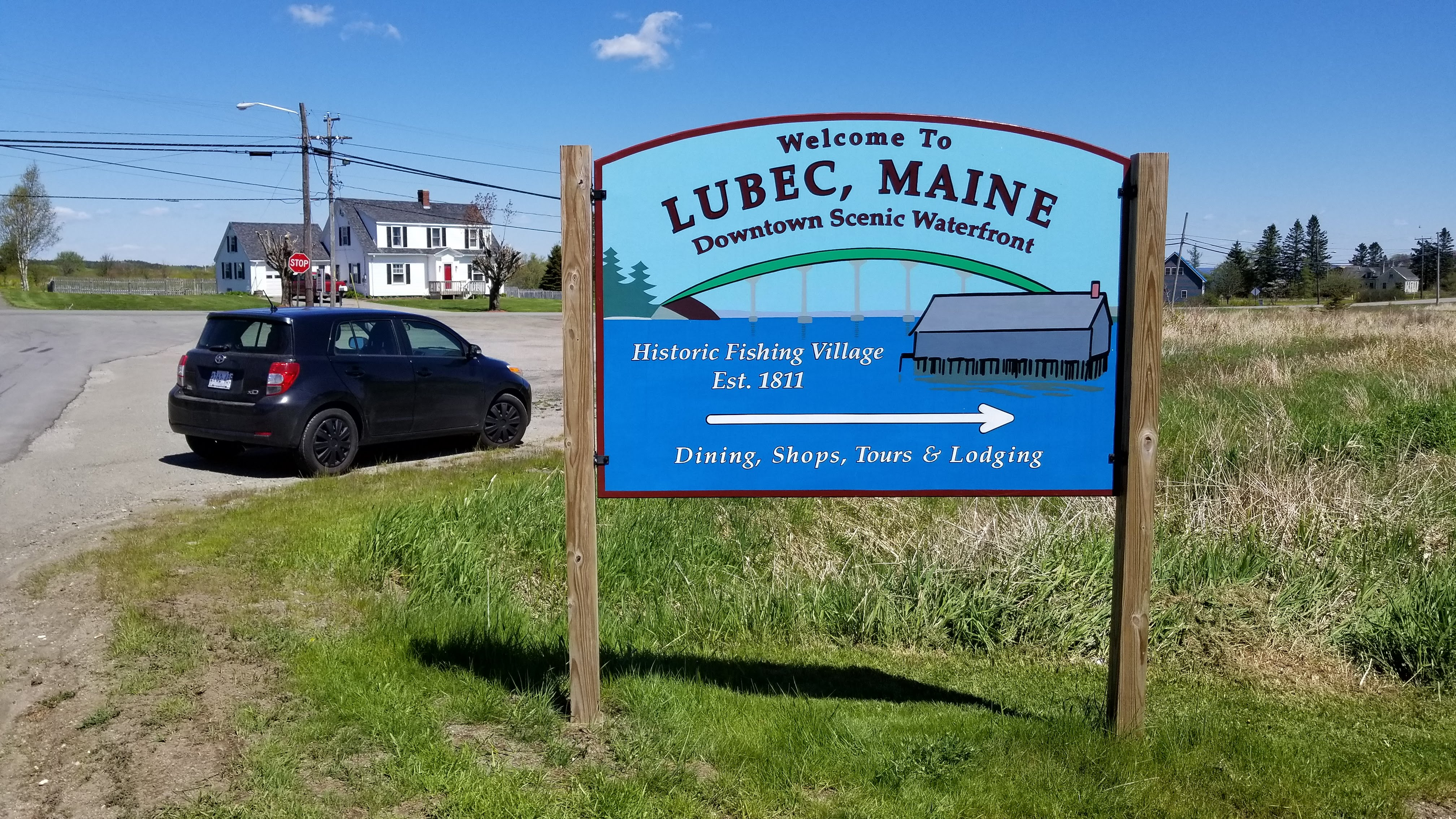
Lubec, Maine Sign

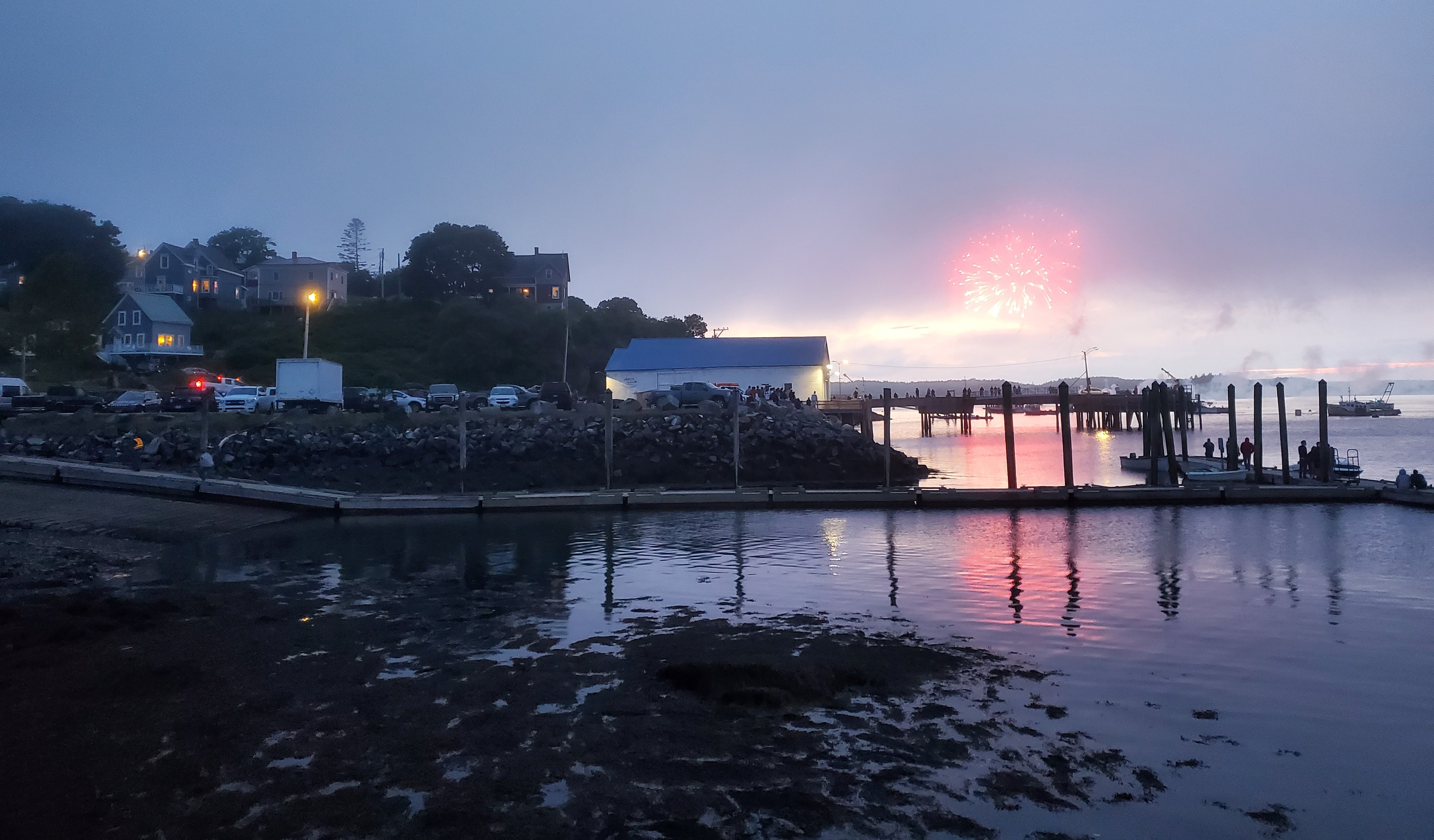
Fourth of July in Lubec

== See also ==
- Machias, Maine
- Washington County, Maine
