= USS Barnstable =

Bayfield-class attack transport ship

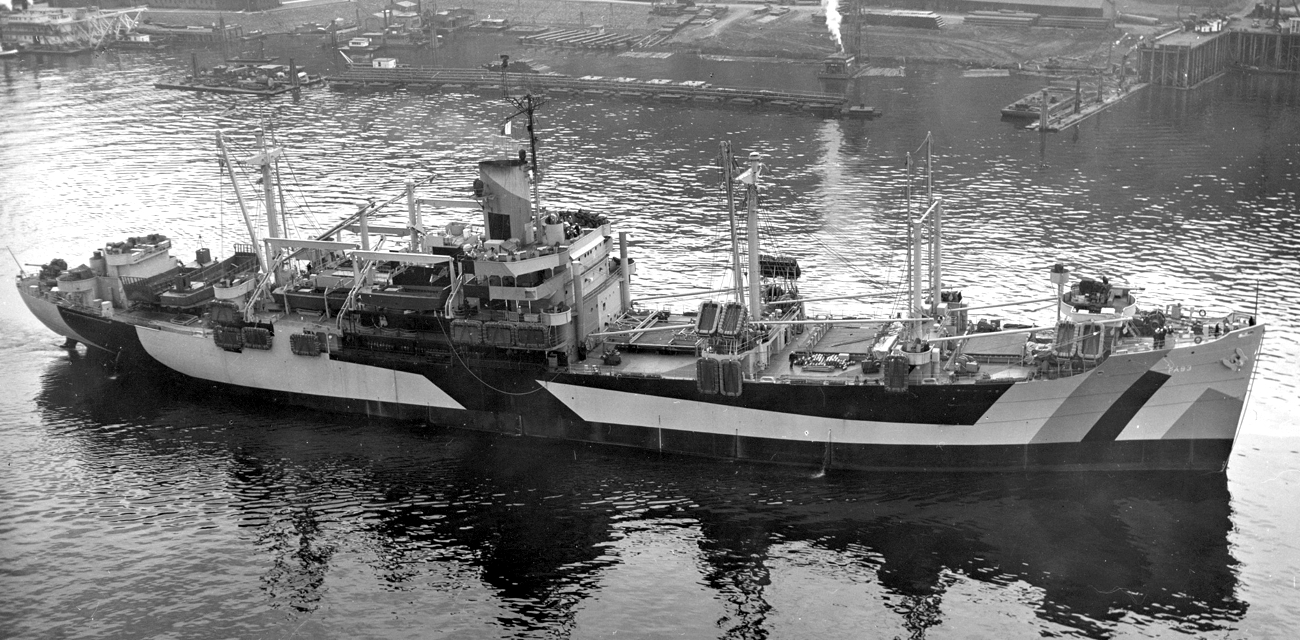

History

United States
- Namesake: Barnstable, Massachusetts
- Builder: Western Pipe & Steel
- Laid down: 6 May 1943
- Launched: 5 August 1943
- Sponsored by: Miss Jean Watts
- Christened: Sea Snapper
- Commissioned: 22 May 1944
- Decommissioned: 24 March 1946
- Renamed: USS Barnstable, Steel Fabricator, Reliance Dynasty, Grand Valor.
- Stricken: 12 April 1946
- Honours and awards: Four battle stars for service in World War II.
- Fate: Scrapped March 1973
- Notes: WPS Hull No. 94.; MC Hull No. 282.; Type C3-S-A2.; Ship delivered 30 October 1943.

General characteristics
- Class & type: Bayfield-class attack transport
- Displacement: 8,591 tons, 16,100 tons fully loaded
- Length: 492 ft (150 m)
- Beam: 69 ft 6 in (21.18 m)
- Draught: 26 ft 6 in (8.08 m)
- Propulsion: Westinghouse geared turbine, 2 × Combustion Engineering D-type boilers, single propeller, designed shaft horsepower 8,500
- Speed: 18 knots
- Boats & landing craft carried: 12 × LCVP, 4 × LCM (Mk-6), 3 × LCP(L) (MK-IV)
- Capacity: 4,700 tons (200,000 cu. ft).
- Complement: Crew: 478; Flag: 43 officers, 108 enlisted.; Troops: 80 officers, 1,146 enlisted
- Armament: 2 × single 5-inch/38 cal. dual-purpose gun mounts, one fore and one aft.; 2 × twin 40 mm AA gun mounts forward, port and starboard.; 2 × single 40 mm AA gun mounts.; 18 × single 20 mm AA gun mounts.

USS Barnstable (APA-93) was a Bayfield-class attack transport in service with the United States Navy from 1944 to 1946. She was sold to commercial service in 1948 and finally scrapped in 1974.

== History ==
The vessel was launched 5 August 1943 by Western Pipe & Steel, Los Angeles, California, under a Maritime Commission contract as Sea Snapper; acquired on a loan charter by the Navy 30 October, and commissioned the same day. Placed out of commission 3 November, Barnstable was outfitted as an APA by Commercial Iron Works, Portland, Oregon, and recommissioned 22 May 1944.

=== Palau Islands ===
Barnstable arrived at Pearl Harbor 30 July 1944 and joined Transport Division 32. Embarking troops and cargo she sailed to Guadalcanal for landing exercises 24 August-8 September, in preparation for the assault on the Palau Islands. Arriving at Peleliu, Palau Islands, 15 September, Barnstable remained there until 21 September, and then took part in the occupation of Ulithi Atoll, Caroline Islands (23–25 September 1944).

=== Leyte ===
Returning to Manus, Admiralty Islands, Barnstable loaded troops and cargo and arrived in Leyte Gulf 20 October 1944. She debarked troops for the assault waves and continued unloading cargo throughout the day. On the 21st she departed, arriving at the Palau Islands 23 October.

Barnstable transported troops and cargo between New Caledonia and the Admiralty Islands and then returned to Leyte, where she landed reinforcements (19–29 November 1944).

=== Luzon and Okinawa ===
Returning to New Guinea, she remained there until embarking troops and cargo for the landings at Lingayen Gulf, Luzon. She arrived 9 January and the following day landed her troops and cargo. She made several trips to the Philippines with reinforcements and then participated in the initial Okinawa landings (1–5 April).

Barnstable returned to the west coast in April 1945. After undergoing repairs, replacements were embarked and she returned to Manila. From Manila she made logistic runs to New Guinea. Upon the cessation of hostilities Barnstable participated in the occupation of Japan (12–26 October 1945), making two runs from the Philippine Islands to Japan transporting Army troops.

=== Decommissioning ===
She returned to California 17 November 1945 and operated along the west coast until January 1946. In February she arrived on the east coast and commenced pre-inactivation overhaul. She was decommissioned 25 March 1946 and returned to the Maritime Commission the following day.

Barnstable received four battle stars for her World War II service.

== Commercial service ==
In 1948 the Maritime Commission sold Barnstable to the Isthmian Steamship Company of New York, who renamed her Steel Fabricator. She was to remain in service with Isthmian Steamship until 1969.

In 1971 the vessel was sold to Reliance Carriers SA of Panama who renamed her Reliance Dynasty. She was sold again the following year to Valor Navigation Corporation of Panama who dubbed her Grand Valor. The vessel was scrapped in Kaohsiung, Taiwan in 1974.
