= Turtledove Clemens =

American marketing communications agency

Coordinates: 45°30′50″N 122°40′27″W

- Type: Private
- Industry: Integrated marketing communications
- Founded: Portland, Oregon, United States (1942)
- Founder: Earl Heims
- Headquarters: Portland, Oregon, U.S.
- Key people: Jay Clemens (CEO/President); Stuart Samuelson (Vice President)
- Website: www.turtledove.com

Turtledove Clemens is an American privately owned integrated marketing communications agency based in Portland, Oregon. The agency's offices are in the historic Jefferson Station building.

== History ==
Turtledove Clemens was founded in Portland, Oregon, in 1942 as Earl Heims & Associates. In 1958, Harry Leonard Turtledove joined the agency, which subsequently became known as Heims and Turtledove Agency. The agency provides local and regional clients with advertising, interactive, media buying, graphic design, and public relations services.

During the 1960s, the agency worked on several public and political advertising campaigns, including advertising for John F. Kennedy's 1960 presidential campaign in Oregon. In 1969, the agency developed a child abuse awareness campaign for the State of Oregon, with one of its posters later becoming part of the Smithsonian's collection.

Jay Clemens joined the agency in 1972 and became a partner in 1977, when the company adopted the name Turtledove Clemens.

During the 1980s, Turtledove Clemens worked on public health advertising initiatives, including an AIDS awareness campaign for the Oregon State Health Division in 1986.

In 1992, the company acquired a majority interest in Ballard Bratsberg, a Seattle-based advertising agency.

In 2007, Turtledove Clemens relocated its Portland offices to the histotic Jefferson Station building. In 2008, a tourism advertising campaign developed for Clackamas County Tourism & Cultural Affairs titled "Visiting Friends & Relatives", received a Gold David Ogilvy Research Award from the Advertising Research Foundation (ARF).

Harry Leonard Turtledove, whose name remained part of the agency's identity, died in 2011. The agency is a member of Independent Marketing Communications Network (ICOM), one of the world's largest networks of independent advertising agencies.
