= East Machias, Maine =

- Town
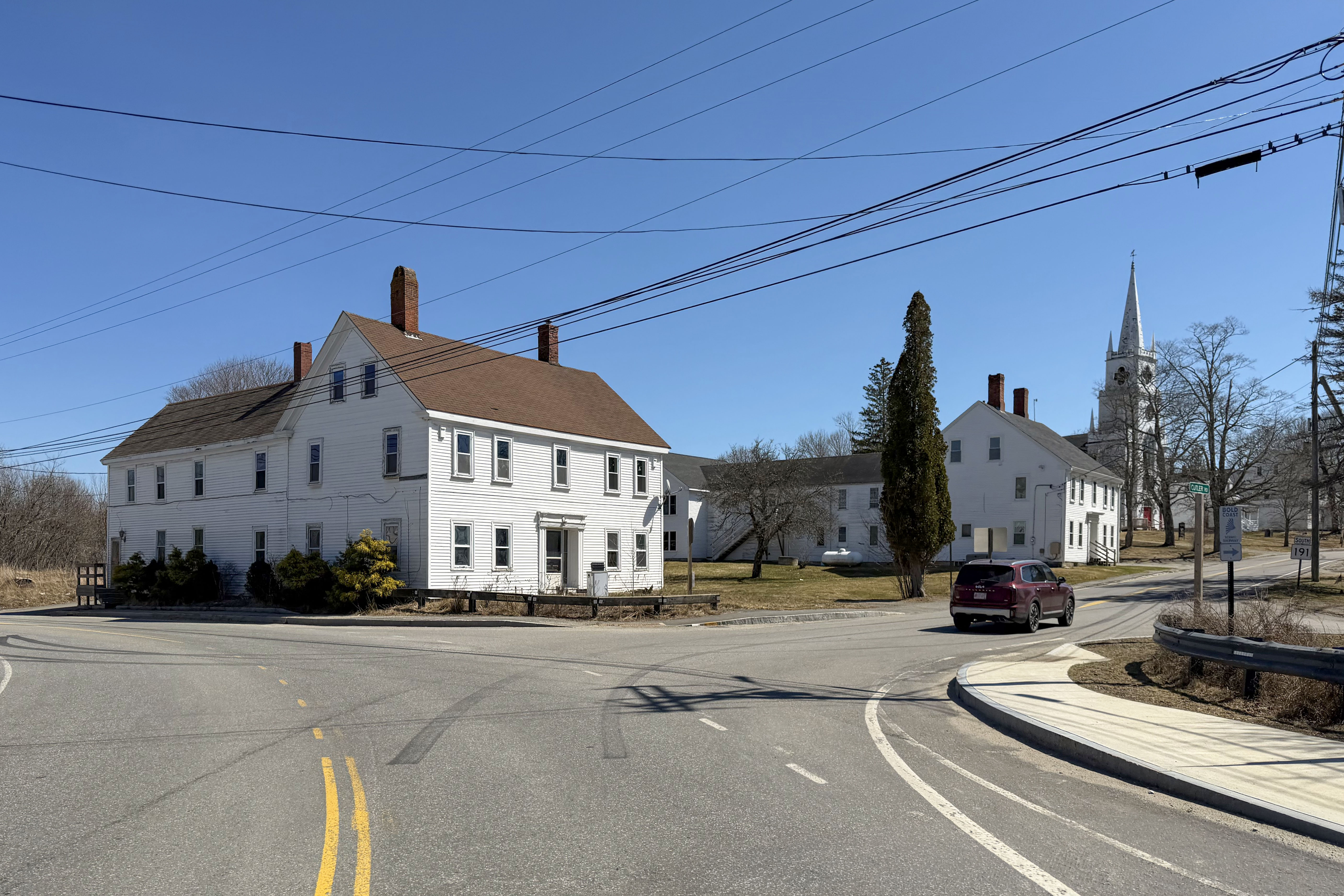
- Main Street

- Location within Maine Location within the United States
- Coordinates: 44°46′30″N 67°24′26″W
- Country: United States
- State: Maine
- County: Washington

Area
  - Total: 40.02 sq mi (103.65 km^{2})
  - Land: 34.81 sq mi (90.16 km^{2})
  - Water: 5.21 sq mi (13.49 km^{2})
- Elevation: 46 ft (14 m)

Population (2020)
  - Total: 1,326
  - Density: 38/sq mi (14.7/km^{2})
- Time zone: UTC-5 (Eastern (EST))
  - Summer (DST): UTC-4 (EDT)
- ZIP code: 04630
- Area code: 207
- FIPS code: 23-20960
- GNIS feature ID: 582457

East Machias is a town in Washington County, Maine, United States on the East Machias River. At the 2020 census, the town population was 1,326. It is the home of Washington Academy, a private school founded in 1792.

== Geography ==
According to the United States Census Bureau, the town has a total area of 40.02 square miles (103.65 km^{2}), of which 34.81 square miles (90.16 km^{2}) is land and 5.21 square miles (13.49 km^{2}) is water.

== Demographics ==
Historical population
Census	Pop.	Note	%±
1830	1,605		—
1840	1,395		−13.1%
1850	1,905		36.6%
1860	2,181		14.5%
1870	2,017		−7.5%
1880	1,875		−7.0%
1890	1,637		−12.7%
1900	1,521		−7.1%
1910	1,392		−8.5%
1920	1,353		−2.8%
1930	1,257		−7.1%
1940	1,183		−5.9%
1950	1,101		−6.9%
1960	1,198		8.8%
1970	1,057		−11.8%
1980	1,233		16.7%
1990	1,218		−1.2%
2000	1,298		6.6%
2010	1,368		5.4%
2020	1,326		−3.1%
U.S. Decennial Census

=== 2014 American Community Survey ===
As of the 2014 American Community Survey the largest self-reported ethnic/ancestry groups in the town of East Machias were English at 24.4%, Irish at 15.4%, German at 14.4% and those who identified as being American ancestry at 7.1%.

=== 2010 census ===
As of the census of 2010, there were 1,368 people, 582 households, and 377 families living in the town. The population density was 39.3 inhabitants per square mile (15.2/km^{2}). There were 845 housing units at an average density of 24.3 per square mile (9.4/km^{2}). The racial makeup of the town was 95.9% White, 0.8% African American, 0.3% Native American, 1.7% Asian, and 1.3% from two or more races. Hispanic or Latino of any race were 1.0% of the population.

There were 582 households, of which 27.0% had children under the age of 18 living with them, 51.9% were married couples living together, 8.4% had a female householder with no husband present, 4.5% had a male householder with no wife present, and 35.2% were non-families. 27.7% of all households were made up of individuals, and 13.6% had someone living alone who was 65 years of age or older. The average household size was 2.31 and the average family size was 2.77.

The median age in the town was 44.6 years. 19.8% of residents were under the age of 18; 8.4% were between the ages of 18 and 24; 22.6% were from 25 to 44; 33.1% were from 45 to 64; and 16.2% were 65 years of age or older. The gender makeup of the town was 48.8% male and 51.2% female.

=== 2000 census ===
As of the census of 2000, there were 1,298 people, 540 households, and 370 families living in the town. The population density was 36.9 inhabitants per square mile (14.2/km^{2}). There were 776 housing units at an average density of 22.0 per square mile (8.5/km^{2}). The racial makeup of the town was 98.84% White, 0.31% Native American, 0.08% Asian, and 0.77% from two or more races.

There were 540 households, out of which 29.4% had children under the age of 18 living with them, 56.5% were married couples living together, 9.3% had a female householder with no husband present, and 31.3% were non-families. 25.7% of all households were made up of individuals, and 11.9% had someone living alone who was 65 years of age or older. The average household size was 2.40 and the average family size was 2.89.

In the town, the population was spread out, with 23.5% under the age of 18, 7.1% from 18 to 24, 26.3% from 25 to 44, 27.0% from 45 to 64, and 16.1% who were 65 years of age or older. The median age was 41 years. For every 100 females, there were 92.6 males. For every 100 females age 18 and over, there were 88.8 males.

The median income for a household in the town was $28,073, and the median income for a family was $32,065. Males had a median income of $26,364 versus $19,118 for females. The per capita income for the town was $13,254. About 12.2% of families and 17.1% of the population were below the poverty line, including 22.2% of those under age 18 and 20.4% of those age 65 or over.

== Education ==
It is in the East Machias School District, which forms a part of the Machias Bay Area School System (Alternative Organizational System 96). Elm Street Elementary School is in East Machias. Machias Memorial High School is AOS96's public high school.

The town has a private school, Washington Academy.

== Notable people ==
- Anna L. Alline, nurse and nursing educator
- Maj. Gen. John Caldwell, played a central role in the Battle of Gettysburg
- Austin Cary, forester
- Samuel Harris, President of Bowdoin College and later professor at Yale University
- Martha Seavey Hoyt, biographer, newspaper correspondent, and businesswoman
- Alfred Stone, architect, founding partner of Stone, Carpenter, and Willson
- William Stone, Attorney General of South Carolina
