= Maine State Route 191 =

State highway in Washington County, Maine, US

State Route 191

Route information
- Maintained by MaineDOT
- Length: 61.24 mi (98.56 km)

Major junctions
- South end: SR 189 in Lubec
- US 1 in East Machias
- North end: US 1 / SR 9 in Baring Plantation

Location
- Country: United States
- State: Maine
- Counties: Washington

Highway system
- Maine State Highway System; Interstate; US; State; Auto trails; Lettered highways
← SR 190	→ SR 192

State Route 191 (SR 191) is a 61.24-mile-long (98.56 km) state highway in the US state of Maine. Its southern terminus at SR 189 in Lubec to U.S. Route 1 (US 1) and SR 9 in Baring Plantation. The route offers a bypass of the city of Calais and access to the Cutler Naval Station in Cutler. The entire route is in Washington County.

== Route description ==
The road begins at SR 189 in Lubec. The route heads south, then west, passing near Haycock Harbor, Moose Cove, Sandy Cove, and Money Cove along the Gulf of Maine. SR 191 then enters Cutler, providing a ferry to Machias Seal Island and passes by the Cutler Naval Station. Entering the town of East Machias, SR 191 turns north and runs along the East Machias River to US 1 where it runs southwest concurrently with it. After 0.09 miles (0.14 km) concurrent with US 1, SR 191 branches off and heads to the northeast. It then crosses the East Machias River. In Cathance Township (formerly Plantation No. 14), SR 191 meets SR 86. This is SR 86's western terminus. As SR 191 continues north, it runs along Lake Cathance in Cooper. Notably, in Cooper, SR 191 heads due east just below the 45 degree North parallel, possibly due to concerns in the 19th century that the Canada–United States border would be set there, as it is in New York and Vermont. Then SR 191 branches off of SR 214 in Meddybemps. This is SR 214's western terminus. SR 191 then runs along the Meddybemps Lake. As it enters Baring Plantation, SR 191 has its northern terminus at US 1 and SR 9.

== Major junctions ==
The entire route is in Washington County.

Location	mi	km	Destinations	Notes
Lubec	0.00	0.00	SR 189 (County Road) – Whiting, Lubec	
East Machias	27.02	43.48	US 1 north (Main Street) – Whiting, Calais	Southern end of US 1 concurrency
East Machias	27.11	43.63	US 1 south (Main Street) – Machias	Northern end of US 1 concurrency
East Central Washington	37.24	59.93	SR 86 east – Marion, Dennysville	Western terminus of SR 86
Meddybemps	54.08	87.03	SR 214 east (Conant Hill Road) – Pembroke	Western terminus of SR 214
Baring Plantation	61.24	98.56	US 1 / SR 9 – Houlton, Calais, St. Stephen, N.B.	
1.000 mi = 1.609 km; 1.000 km = 0.621 mi: Concurrency terminus
