= Lincoln House (Dennysville, Maine) =

Historic house in Maine, United States

- U.S. National Register of Historic Places
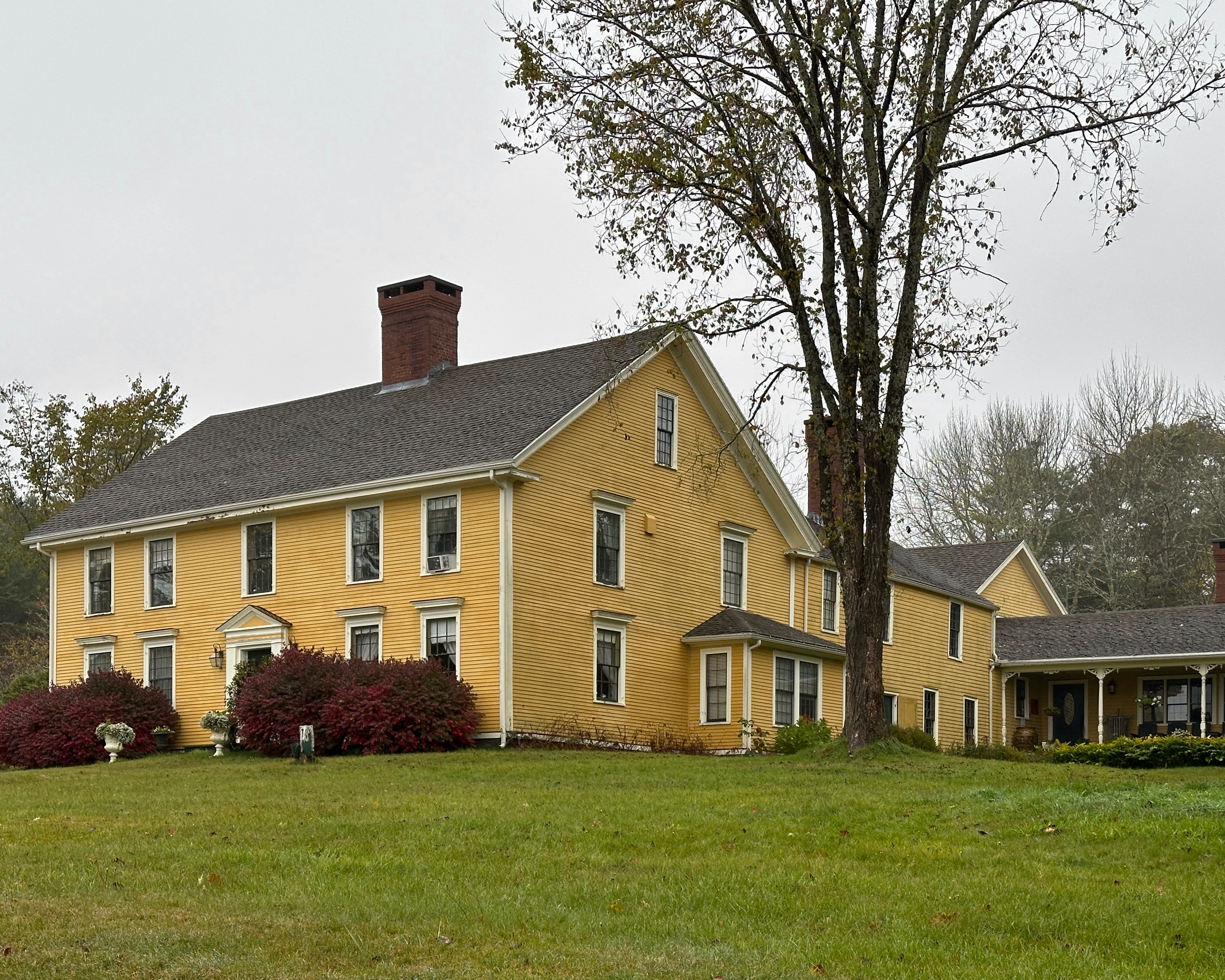

- Location within Maine Location within the United States
- Location: SR 86, Dennysville, Maine
- Coordinates: 44°54′23″N 67°13′44″W
- Area: 1 acre (0.40 ha)
- Built: 1787
- Built by: Joshua Chubbock
- NRHP reference No.: 78000206
- Added to NRHP: March 29, 1978

The Lincoln House is a historic house on Maine State Route 86 in Dennysville, Maine. Built in 1787, it is the community's oldest standing structure, built during the earliest period of its settlement for Theodore Lincoln, the son of proprietor Benjamin Lincoln who oversaw the area's settlement. The house was listed on the National Register of Historic Places in 1978.

== Description and history ==
The Lincoln House is located on the northwest side of Maine state Route 86, overlooking the Dennys River at the northern fringe of the town's dispersed village center. It is a 2 1/2-story wood-frame structure, five bays wide, with a side-gable roof, central chimney, clapboard siding, and fieldstone foundation. The central entrance is simply framed, with a triangular pediment above. First-floor windows are topped by small entablatured lintels, while the second-floor windows have plain lintels butted against the cornice. A period ell extends north from the rear of the building, joining the house to a larger single-story 20th-century ell.

The area that is now Dennysville was part of a grant of 10,000 acres granted to a group of Massachusetts proprietors led by American Revolutionary War general Benjamin Lincoln. In 1786 Lincoln sent his son Theodore and a group of settlers to the region, and this house was built for the younger Lincoln the following year. It was built by Hingham, Massachusetts builder Joshua Chubbuck, and was the first frame house built in what is now Dennysville. Notable visitors to the house include John James Audubon, whose wife stayed with the Lincolns in 1833 while he went to Labrador. A later resident was Anna Maxwell Brown, an opera singer for the D'Oyly Carte Opera Company, who married into the Lincoln family.

== See also ==
- National Register of Historic Places listings in Washington County, Maine
