= Maine State Route 86 =

State highway in Washington County, Maine, US

State Route 86

Route information
- Maintained by MaineDOT
- Length: 10.28 mi (16.54 km)
- Existed: 1962–present

Major junctions
- West end: SR 191 near East Machias
- East end: US 1 in Dennysville

Location
- Country: United States
- State: Maine
- Counties: Washington

Highway system
- Maine State Highway System; Interstate; US; State; Auto trails; Lettered highways
← SR 85	→ SR 88

State Route 86 (SR 86) is part of Maine's system of numbered state highways, located in the far eastern part of the state. It is a minor connecting route, running 10.3 miles (16.6 km) from an intersection with SR 191 near East Machias to an intersection with U.S. Route 1 (US 1) in Dennysville. SR 86 runs mostly through unincorporated forest land.

== Route description ==
SR 86 begins at an intersection with SR 191 in Marion Township, part of the unorganized territory of East Central Washington, just outside East Machias. SR 86 proceeds eastward through unincorporated Edmunds Township into the town of Dennysville, where it ends at US 1. SR 86 is named King Street in Dennysville.

== Junction list ==
The entire route is in Washington County.

Location	mi	km	Destinations	Notes
East Central Washington	0.00	0.00	SR 191 – East Machias, Baring Plantation	
Dennysville	10.28	16.54	US 1 (River Road) – Pembroke, Calais	
1.000 mi = 1.609 km; 1.000 km = 0.621 mi
