= Ntolonapemk, Eastern Surplus Superfund Site =

- U.S. National Register of Historic Places
- Location within Maine Location within the United States
- Nearest city: Meddybemps, Maine
- Coordinates: 45°2′18″N 67°21′31″W
- Area: 3 acres (1.2 ha)
- NRHP reference No.: 01000819
- Added to NRHP: August 8, 2001

Ntolonapemk, also known as the Eastern Surplus Company Superfund Site and Maine State Survey No. 96.02, is a prehistoric archaeological site in Meddybemps, a small town in Washington County, Maine. Located near the outlet of Meddybemps Lake, it is one of the only major inland prehistoric habitation sites in the county, with evidence of more than 8,000 years of use. The site was listed on the National Register of Historic Places in 2001.

== Description ==
"Ntolonapemk" is a historic name given to the site by the local Passamaquoddy tribe, meaning "Our Relative's Place". It is located on the south shore of Meddybemps Lake, at its outlet into the Dennys River. The site was locally well known as a place where small stone artifacts could be found, and was used as a storage site for military surplus goods by the Eastern Surplus Company beginning in 1946. In the 1980s it was identified as a Superfund site, and cleanup began in 1998. The area was first identified by state archaeologists in 1967, and underwent an in-depth excavations in 2000 and 2001. The site is located along what was a well-traveled Native route between Passamaquoddy Bay and the interior of Maine, and has yielded evidence of periodic occupation of the site from the Early Archaic (c. 8000 BCE) to the time of European contact and beyond.

More than 200 features have been found at the site, include large number of fire hearths, garbage pits, and storage pits. Artifacts found at the site include more than 70,000 animal bones, most of them consist with use as food. Alewife and other small anadromous fish were prominent in this assemblage, and were found across the time span of the site.

== See also ==
- National Register of Historic Places listings in Washington County, Maine
