= Hardscrabble River =

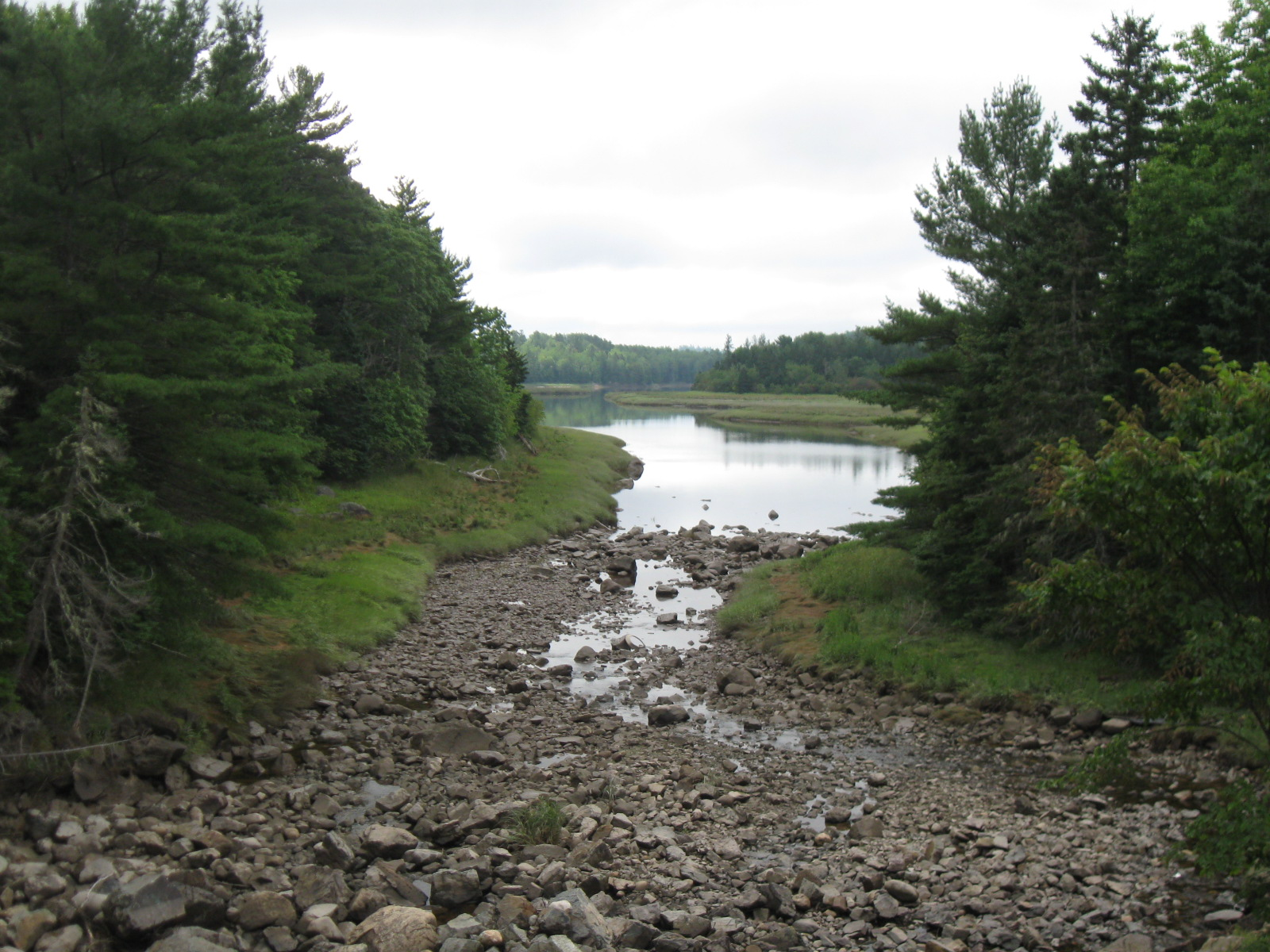
- Hardscrabble River at head of tide, from U.S. Route 1

Location
- Country: United States

Physical characteristics
- Source
  - location: Maine
- Mouth
  - location: Dennys Bay
  - coordinates: 44°54′11″N 67°10′41″W
  - elevation: sea level
- Length: about 10 miles (16 km)

Hardscrabble River is the estuary of Wilson Stream, a small river in Washington County, Maine. From its source (44°59′46″N 67°16′55″W) in Charlotte, Wilson Stream runs about 10 miles (16 km) southeast to Dennys Bay. It changes name to Hardscrabble River at about the point where it is crossed by U.S. Route 1 (44°56′02″N 67°13′34″W). This section of the stream separates Pembroke on its left bank from Dennysville and Edmunds on its right.

== See also ==
- List of rivers of Maine
