= Maine State Route 189 =

State highway in Washington County, Maine, US

State Route 189

Route information
- Maintained by MaineDOT
- Length: 11.25 mi (18.11 km)
- Existed: 1962 (current alignment)–present

Major junctions
- West end: US 1 in Whiting
- SR 191 in Lubec
- East end: Route 774 at the Canadian border in Lubec

Location
- Country: United States
- State: Maine
- Counties: Washington

Highway system
- Maine State Highway System; Interstate; US; State; Auto trails; Lettered highways
← SR 188	→ SR 190

State Route 189 (SR 189) is a numbered state highway in Maine, running from U.S. Route 1 (US 1) in Whiting in the west to the Canada–US border at Lubec in the east. In Lubec the route crosses the Franklin Delano Roosevelt Bridge onto Campobello Island, New Brunswick. SR 189 runs a total of 11 1/4 miles (18.1 km).

== Route description ==
SR 189 begins its eastward trek with its intersection with US 1 in Whiting. From the junction, the route generally follows a northeasterly course through Trescott Township (part of the East Central Washington unorganized territory) and West Lubec prior to reaching its eastern terminus at the Franklin Delano Roosevelt Bridge. Via the bridge, SR 189 crosses Johnson Bay into New Brunswick and continues as New Brunswick Route 774.

== Major junctions ==
The entire route is in Washington County.

Location	mi	km	Destinations	Notes
Whiting	0.00	0.00	US 1 (South River Road) – Machias, Eastport, Calais	
Lubec	5.73	9.22	SR 191 north (Dixie Road) – Cutler	Southern terminus of SR 191
Lubec Narrows	11.17– 11.25	17.98– 18.11	Franklin Delano Roosevelt Bridge	
Lubec	11.25	18.11	Route 774 north – Campobello Island	New Brunswick provincial line Canada–United States border
1.000 mi = 1.609 km; 1.000 km = 0.621 mi
