= Dennys River =

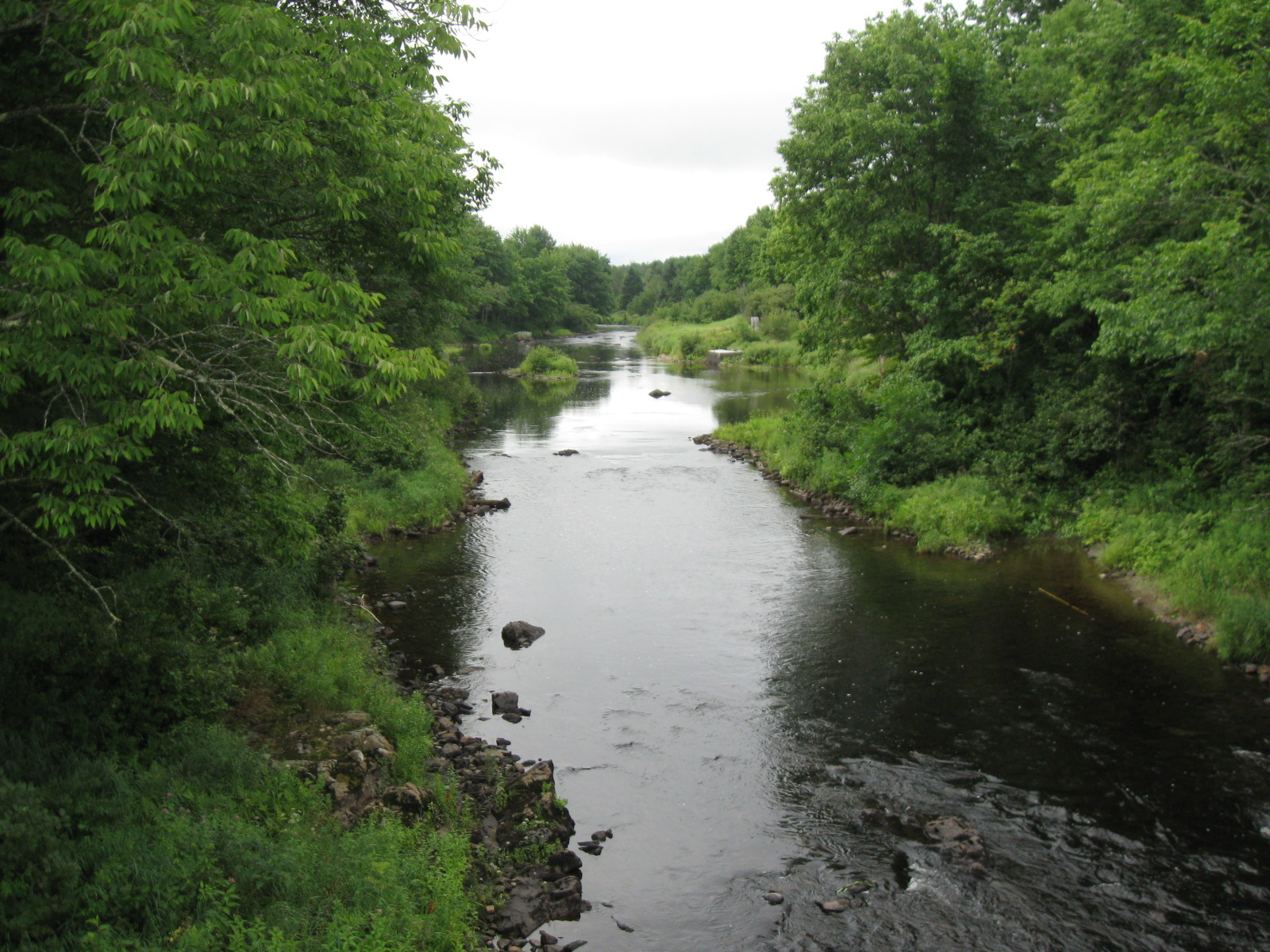
- Dennys River from Bunker Hill Road in Dennysville

Location
- Country: United States

Physical characteristics
- Source
  - location: Maine
- Mouth
  - location: Hardscrabble River
  - coordinates: 44°54′36″N 67°11′49″W
  - elevation: sea level
- Length: 23 mi (37 km)

The Dennys River is a river in Washington County, Maine. From the outflow of Meddybemps Lake (45°02′20″N 67°21′27″W) in Meddybemps, the river runs about 23 miles (37 km) southeast and east to Dennysville, where it becomes tidal and soon joins the Hardscrabble River estuary to form Dennys Bay.

The Dennys River was named for an Indian hunter.

== See also ==
- List of rivers of Maine
