= Maine State Route 214 =

State highway in Washington County, Maine, US

State Route 214

Route information
- Maintained by MaineDOT
- Length: 9.98 mi (16.06 km)

Major junctions
- West end: SR 191 in Meddybemps
- East end: US 1 in Pembroke

Location
- Country: United States
- State: Maine
- Counties: Washington

Highway system
- Maine State Highway System; Interstate; US; State; Auto trails; Lettered highways
← SR 213	→ SR 215

State Route 214 (SR 214) is a ten-mile-long (16 km) route from SR 191 in Meddybemps to U.S. Route 1 (US 1) in Pembroke. For the entire length, SR 214 is called Ayers Junction Road and is in Washington County.

== Major junctions ==
The entire route is in Washington County.

Location	mi	km	Destinations	Notes
Meddybemps	0.00	0.00	SR 191 (Main Street) – Calais, Machias	
Pembroke	9.98	16.06	US 1 (South River Road) / Ayres Junction Road – Calais, Machias	
1.000 mi = 1.609 km; 1.000 km = 0.621 mi
