= New Brunswick Route 774 =

Highway in New Brunswick, Canada

Route 774

Route information
- Maintained by New Brunswick Department of Transportation
- Length: 14.9 km (9.3 mi)

Major junctions
- North end: Lighthouse Road north of Head Harbour
- South end: SR 189 at the U.S. border in Lubec, ME

Location
- Country: Canada
- Province: New Brunswick

Highway system
- Provincial highways in New Brunswick; Former routes
← Route 772	→ Route 776

Route 774 is a 14.9-kilometre (9.3 mi) long north–south secondary highway on Campobello Island in Charlotte County, New Brunswick, Canada.

== Route description ==
The route's northern terminus is near Head Harbour Island. The road travels southwest past Pollock Cove, and into Wilsons Beach. From here, the route passes several coves including Curry Cove, Otter Cove, Clarks Cove and Conroy Cove. It passes the east bank of Harbour de Lute, turns east, and enters Welshpool on Friars Bay. The route then continues south past Herring Cove Provincial Park, Snug Cove, Roosevelt Campobello International Park, and finally Union Cove before ending at the Franklin Delano Roosevelt Bridge at the Canada–US border continuing on as Maine State Route 189.
