= Pennamaquan River =

Location
- Country: United States
- State: Maine
- City: Pembroke

Physical characteristics
- Source: Pennamaquan Lake
  - coordinates: 44°59′45″N 67°12′30″W
  - elevation: 75 ft (23 m)
- Mouth: Cobscook Bay
  - coordinates: 44°55′5″N 67°7′5″W
  - elevation: 0 ft (0 m)

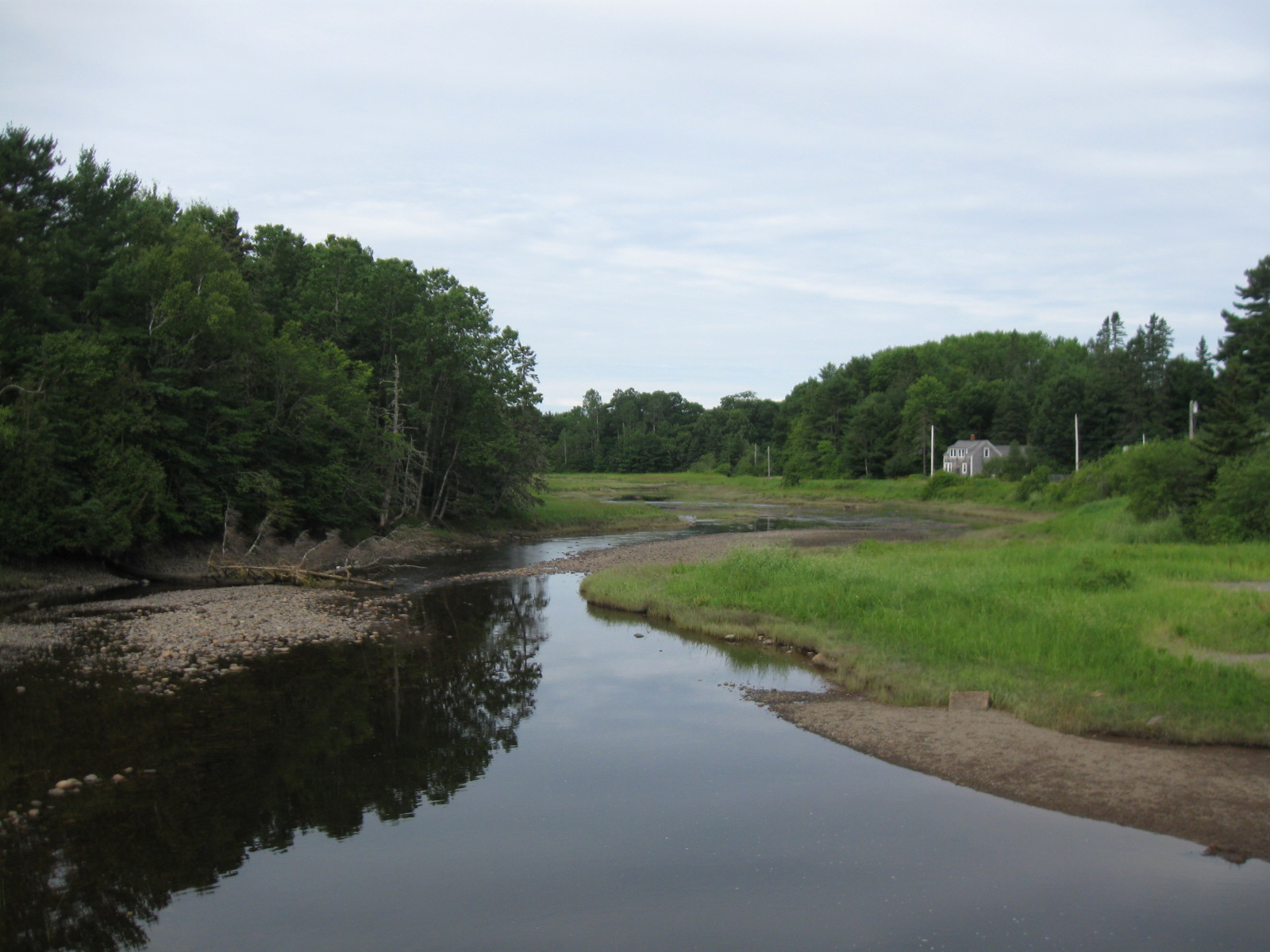
Head of tide at Pembroke

The Pennamaquan River is a short, 8.1-mile (13 km) river in the U.S. state of Maine, draining from medium-sized, low-elevation Pennamaquan Lake into Cobscook Bay.

== Course ==
The river begins at the outlet of Pennamaquan Lake, which is located about 3.4 miles (5.5 km) northwest of Pembroke. The river flows southeast for about 3.3 miles (5.3 km) before turning briefly south for about 1.4 miles (2.3 km) before entering Cobscook Bay.

== Tributaries ==
Of Pennamaquan Lake

- Taylor Brook
- Moosehorn Brook
- Round Lake
- Ohio Brook

Of the main river

- Crow Brook

== See also ==
- List of rivers in Maine
