= Meddybemps Lake =

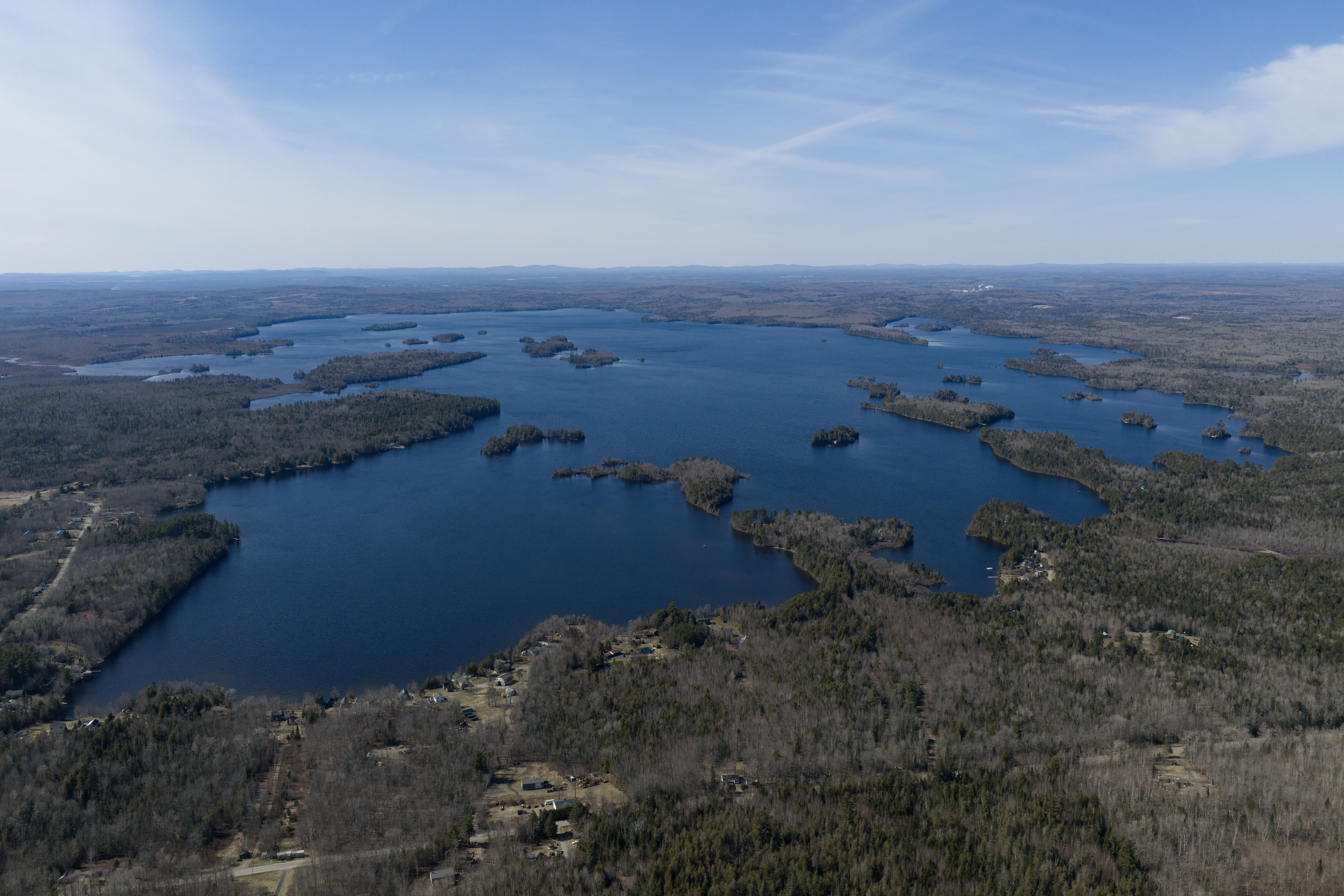

- Location within Maine
- Location: Washington County, Maine, United States
- Coordinates: 45°02′27″N 67°21′22″W
- Type: Reservoir
- Surface area: 6,765 acres (2,738 ha)
- Max. depth: 58 ft (18 m)
- Surface elevation: 174 ft (53 m)
- Islands: Numerous
- Settlements: Alexander; Baileyville; Baring; Meddybemps

Meddybemps Lake is a large lake in Washington County, Maine. The lake contains numerous islands, and has a total area of about 6,765 acres (27.38 km^{2}). Its maximum depth is 58 feet (18 m). The lake itself is split between four towns: Alexander, Baileyville, Baring, and Meddybemps. It is well known for its prolific smallmouth bass fishing.
