= Dennys Bay =

Bay in Maine, United States

Coordinates: 44°53′N 67°10′W

Dennys Bay is a bay in Washington County, Maine. Located between the towns of Pembroke, Dennysville, and Whiting, it extends roughly 5 mi. (8 km) from Dennysville to Cobscook Bay and is 2 mi. (3 km) at its widest.
