= Franklin Delano Roosevelt Bridge =

International bridge between the United States and Canada

Franklin Delano Roosevelt Memorial Bridge
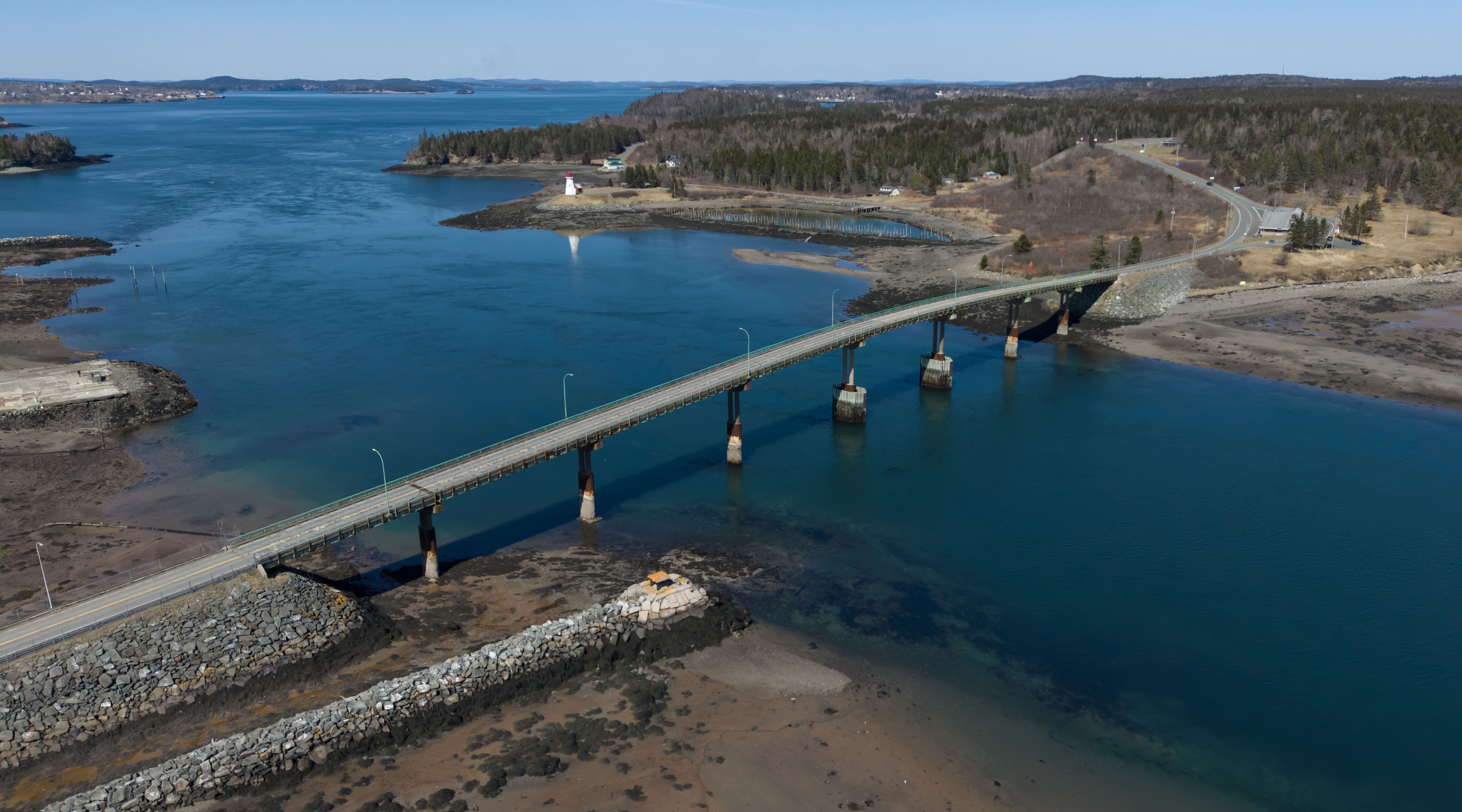
- Coordinates: 44°51′33.8″N 66°58′48.8″W
- Carries: Route 774 and SR 189
- Crosses: Lubec Channel
- Locale: Lubec, Maine and Campobello, New Brunswick
- Official name: Franklin Delano Roosevelt Memorial Bridge
- Other name: Roosevelt International Bridge
- Named for: Franklin D. Roosevelt
- Website: www.cbp.gov/contact/ports/eastport

Characteristics
- Material: Steel

History
- Construction start: 1958
- Opened: 1962

Location
- Interactive map of Franklin Delano Roosevelt Memorial Bridge

The Franklin Delano Roosevelt Memorial Bridge is an international bridge which connects the community of Lubec, Maine in the United States with Campobello Island in the Canadian province of New Brunswick across the Lubec Narrows. The decked steel beam bridge is named for Franklin D. Roosevelt, the 32nd President of the United States, who maintained a summer retreat on Campobello Island (now preserved as Roosevelt Campobello International Park). A plaque in the middle of the bridge is the easternmost physical marker of the Canada–United States border.

The bridge, connecting New Brunswick Route 774 to Maine State Route 189, is Campobello Island's only fixed connection to the mainland of North America; all of the island's transportation connections to the rest of New Brunswick are by seasonal ferry.

== Border crossing ==
U.S. Customs and Border Protection and Canada Border Services Agency stations are located at each end of the Franklin Delano Roosevelt Memorial Bridge, forming the Lubec-Campobello Border Crossing. Although a ferry connected Lubec with Campobello Island for many years, permanent border inspection facilities were not deployed until the bridge was completed in 1962. The US operated out of a mobile home for the first two years.

The crossing is the easternmost on the border between the United States and Canada.

== History ==
In 1958, the Canadian government passed the Campobello-Lubec Bridge Act providing for the framework for the construction of the span. Following a few years of planning, the bridge opened to traffic in 1962, with its official dedication occurring on August 15, 1962.

== See also ==
- List of buildings and monuments honoring presidents of the United States in other countries
- List of international bridges in North America
