= East Central Washington, Maine =

- Unorganized territory
- Location within Maine Location within the United States
- Coordinates: 44°49′47.6″N 67°18′37.5″W
- Country: United States
- State: Maine
- County: Washington

Area
  - Total: 252.6 sq mi (654.2 km^{2})
  - Land: 208.0 sq mi (538.7 km^{2})
  - Water: 44.6 sq mi (115.5 km^{2})
- Elevation: 154 ft (47 m)

Population (2020)
  - Total: 724
  - Density: 3.48/sq mi (1.34/km^{2})
- Time zone: UTC-5 (Eastern (EST))
  - Summer (DST): UTC-4 (EDT)
- ZIP Codes: 04628 (Dennysville); 04630 (East Machias); 04652 (Lubec); 04657 (Meddybemps)
- Area code: 207
- FIPS code: 23-19870
- GNIS feature ID: 582455

East Central Washington is an unorganized territory in Washington County, Maine, United States. The population was 724 at the 2020 census.

== Geography ==
According to the United States Census Bureau, the unorganized territory has a total area of 252.6 square miles (654.2 km^{2}), of which 208.0 square miles (538.7 km^{2}) is land and 44.6 square miles (115.5 km^{2}), or 17.66%, is water.

The territory consists of six townships:

- T19 ED BPP
- Berry
- Cathance
- Marion
- Edmunds
- Trescott

== Demographics ==
Historical population
Census	Pop.	Note	%±
1970	498		—
1980	625		25.5%
1990	661		5.8%
2000	768		16.2%
2010	728		−5.2%
2020	724		−0.5%
U.S. Decennial Census

As of the census of 2000, there were 768 people, 315 households, and 219 families residing in the unorganized territory. The population density was 3.7 inhabitants per square mile (1.4/km^{2}). There were 609 housing units at an average density of 2.9 per square mile (1.1/km^{2}). The racial makeup of the unorganized territory was 97.01% White, 0.13% Black or African American, 1.43% Native American, 0.13% Asian, 0.39% from other races, and 0.91% from two or more races. Hispanic or Latino of any race were 0.78% of the population.

There were 315 households, of which 31.1% had children under 18 living with them, 56.5% were married couples living together, 9.2% had a female householder with no husband present, and 30.2% were non-families. 22.5% of all households were made up of individuals, and 7.0% had someone living alone who was 65 years of age or older. The average household size was 2.44 and the average family size was 2.87.

In the unorganized territory the population was spread out, with 24.7% under the age of 18, 7.8% from 18 to 24, 28.0% from 25 to 44, 25.4% from 45 to 64, and 14.1% who were 65 years of age or older. The median age was 38 years. For every 100 females, there were 96.4 males. For every 100 females age 18 and over, there were 95.3 males.

The median income for a household in the unorganized territory was $25,125, and the median income for a family was $27,500. Males had a median income of $28,571 versus $20,000 for females. The per capita income for the unorganized territory was $12,882. About 13.9% of families and 19.0% of the population were below the poverty line, including 18.8% of those under age 18 and 16.2% of those age 65 or over.

== Education ==
The Maine Department of Education takes responsibility for coordinating school assignments in the unorganized territory.
