= Baring Plantation, Maine =

- Plantation
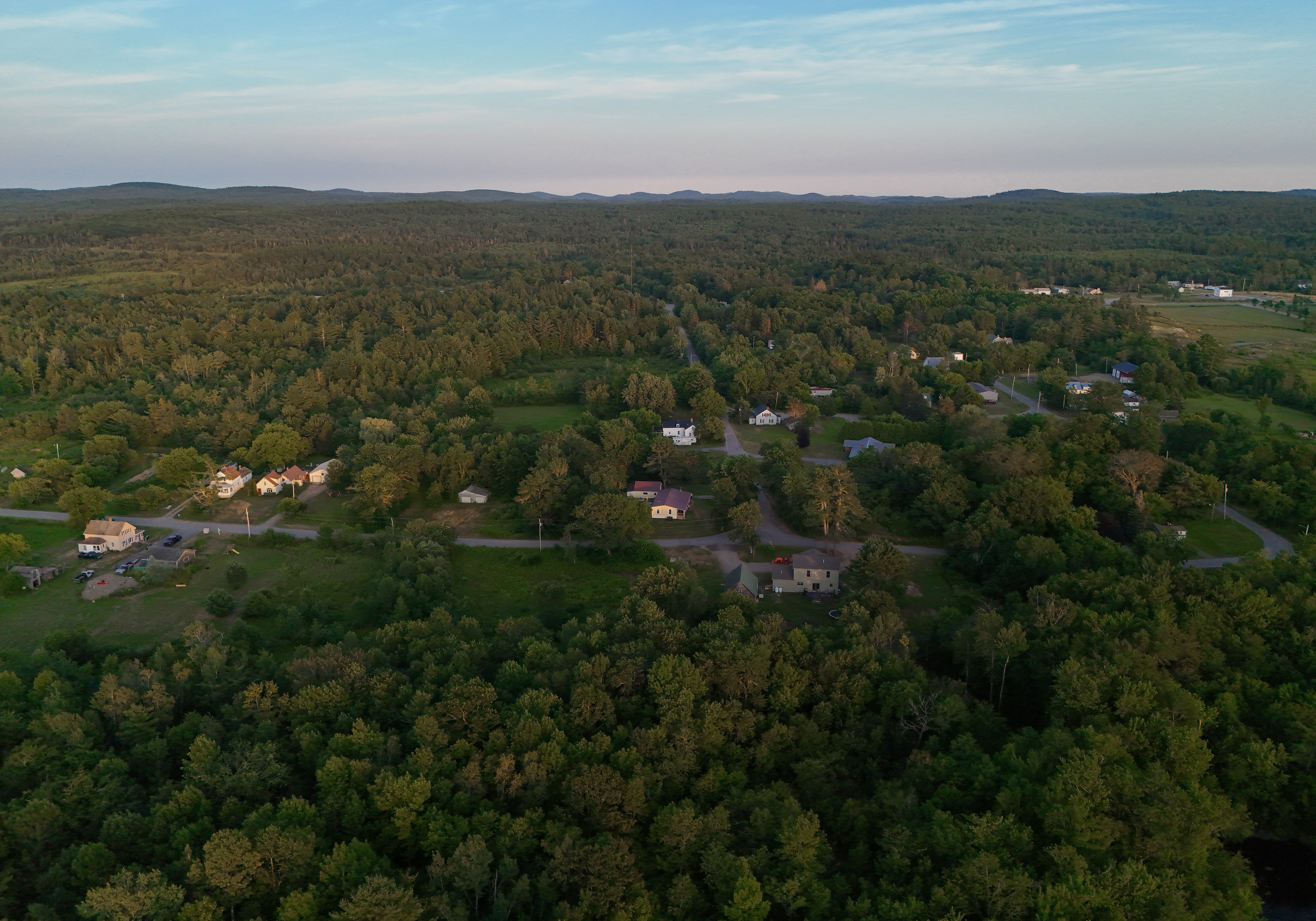
- Areal view of Baring Plantation

- Seal

- Location within Maine Location within the United States
- Coordinates: 45°08′04″N 67°18′56″W
- Country: United States
- State: Maine
- County: Washington

Area
  - Total: 24.1 sq mi (62.4 km^{2})
  - Land: 20.9 sq mi (54.1 km^{2})
  - Water: 3.2 sq mi (8.3 km^{2})
- Elevation: 249 ft (76 m)

Population (2020)
  - Total: 201
  - Density: 9.62/sq mi (3.72/km^{2})
- Time zone: UTC-5 (Eastern (EST))
  - Summer (DST): UTC-4 (EDT)
- ZIP code: 04694
- Area code: 207
- FIPS code: 23-02970
- GNIS feature ID: 582342
- Website: baringplantation.gov

Baring Plantation is a plantation in Washington County, Maine, United States. The population was 201 at the 2020 census. The plantation is named for Alexander Baring, 1st Baron Ashburton, the British negotiator of the Webster–Ashburton Treaty which ended the Aroostook War in 1838–1839.

== Geography ==
According to the United States Census Bureau, the plantation has a total area of 24.1 square miles (62 km^{2}), of which 20.9 square miles (54 km^{2}) is land and 3.2 square miles (8.3 km^{2}), or 13.20%, is water.

== Demographics ==
Historical population
Census	Pop.	Note	%±
1830	159		—
1840	376		136.5%
1850	380		1.1%
1860	409		7.6%
1870	364		−11.0%
1880	303		−16.8%
1890	273		−9.9%
1900	231		−15.4%
1910	228		−1.3%
1920	227		−0.4%
1930	204		−10.1%
1940	190		−6.9%
1950	157		−17.4%
1970	181		—
1980	308		70.2%
1990	275		−10.7%
2000	273		−0.7%
2010	251		−8.1%
2020	201		−19.9%
U.S. Decennial Census

As of the census of 2000, there were 273 people, 113 households, and 81 families residing in the plantation. The population density was 13.1 people per square mile (5.0/km^{2}). There were 146 housing units at an average density of 7.0 per square mile (2.7/km^{2}). The racial makeup of the plantation was 97.80% White, 0.37% African American, 0.37% Native American, and 1.47% from two or more races.

There were 113 households, out of which 27.4% had children under the age of 18 living with them, 61.9% were married couples living together, 8.8% had a female householder with no husband present, and 28.3% were non-families. 23.9% of all households were made up of individuals, and 8.8% had someone living alone who was 65 years of age or older. The average household size was 2.42, and the average family size was 2.85.

In the plantation, the population was spread out, with 22.0% under the age of 18, 9.2% from 18 to 24, 25.6% from 25 to 44, 29.3% from 45 to 64, and 13.9% who were 65 years of age or older. The median age was 41 years. For every 100 females, there were 103.7 males. For every 100 females age 18 and over, there were 102.9 males.

The median income for a household in the plantation was $30,536, and the median income for a family was $35,000. Males had a median income of $32,344 versus $19,531 for females. The per capita income for the plantation was $14,083. About 12.5% of families and 20.2% of the population were below the poverty line, including 33.3% of those under 18 and 25.0% of those 65 or over.

== Education ==
Baring Plantation students attend Calais High School or Woodland High School.
