= Pembroke, Maine =

Town in Maine, United States

- Town
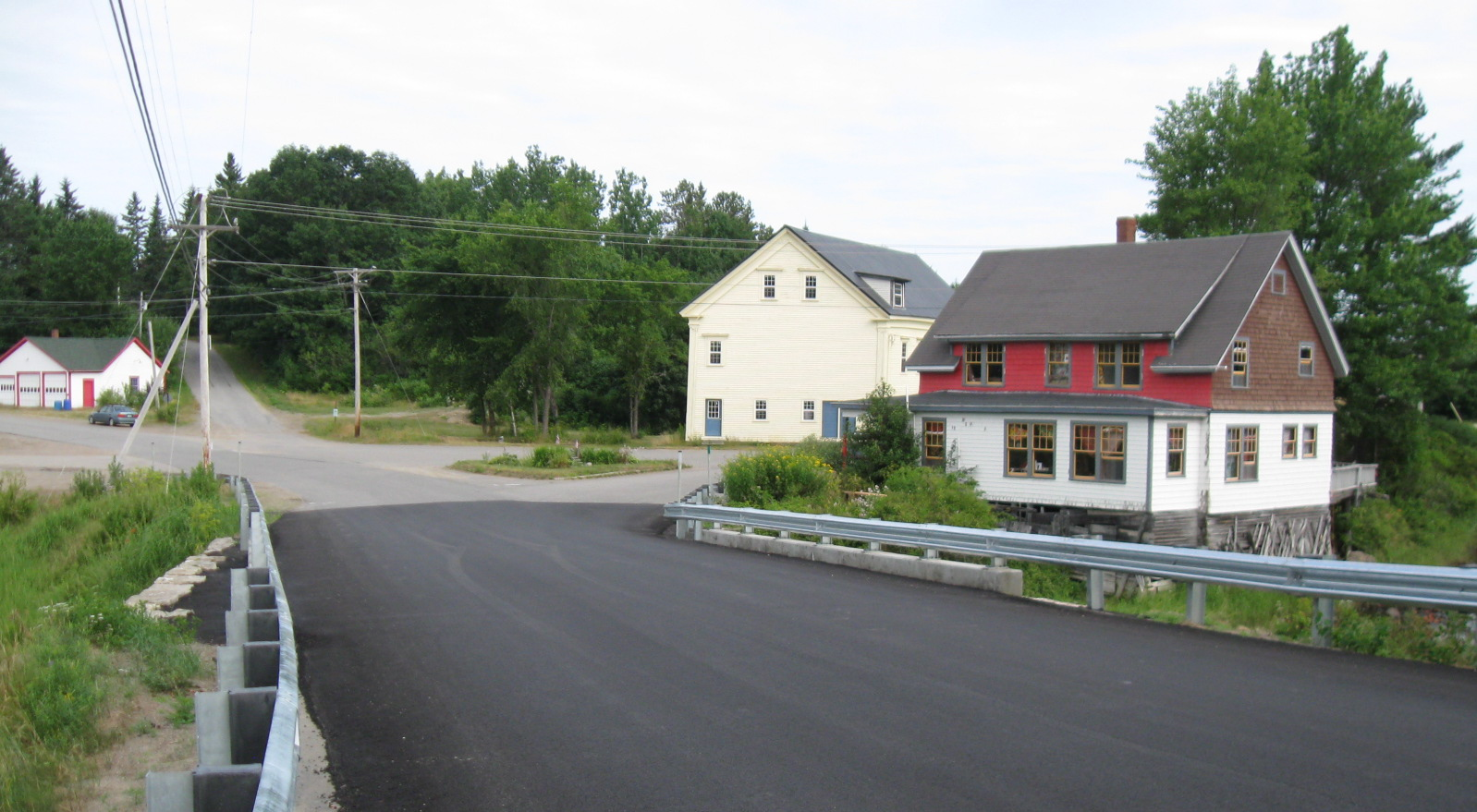
- Union Square in 2012

- Location within Maine Location within the United States
- Coordinates: 44°56′55″N 67°10′35″W
- Country: United States
- State: Maine
- County: Washington
- Incorporated: 1832

Area
  - Total: 35.26 sq mi (91.32 km^{2})
  - Land: 27.36 sq mi (70.86 km^{2})
  - Water: 7.90 sq mi (20.46 km^{2})
- Elevation: 33 ft (10 m)

Population (2020)
  - Total: 788
  - Density: 29/sq mi (11.1/km^{2})
- Time zone: UTC-5 (Eastern (EST))
  - Summer (DST): UTC-4 (EDT)
- ZIP code: 04666
- Area code: 207
- FIPS code: 23-57780
- GNIS feature ID: 582667
- Website: www.pembrokemaine.org

Pembroke is a town in Washington County, Maine, United States. The population was 788 at the 2020 census. The town is home to a reversing falls on Mahar's Point.

== History ==
Called Pennamaquan by the Passamaquoddy Indians, the area was settled about 1774 as part of Dennysville. It was set off and incorporated on February 4, 1832, by the legislature, which named it after Pembroke in Wales, a community with a history of wooden shipbuilding stretching back to the Middle Ages. With one of the finest harbors in Maine, Pembroke too became a shipbuilding center. Vessels were constructed here as early as 1825. By 1859, when the population was 1,712, there were seven shipyards operating. Most schooners constructed here were used either by the coasting trade or fisheries.

Pembroke also had a stone factory, three sawmills, one gristmill, four shingle mills and four lath machines. Near the head of tide stood the Pembroke Iron Company, established in 1832 and by 1856 producing almost 5,000 tons of iron spikes, rivets and nails a year. Another occupation was agriculture. In 1880, the town's population was 2,324.

== Geography ==
According to the United States Census Bureau, the town has a total area of 35.26 square miles (91.32 km^{2}), of which 27.36 square miles (70.86 km^{2}) is land and 7.90 square miles (20.46 km^{2}) is water. Drained by the Pennamaquan River, Pembroke is on Cobscook Bay.

The town is crossed by U.S. Route 1 and Maine State Route 214.

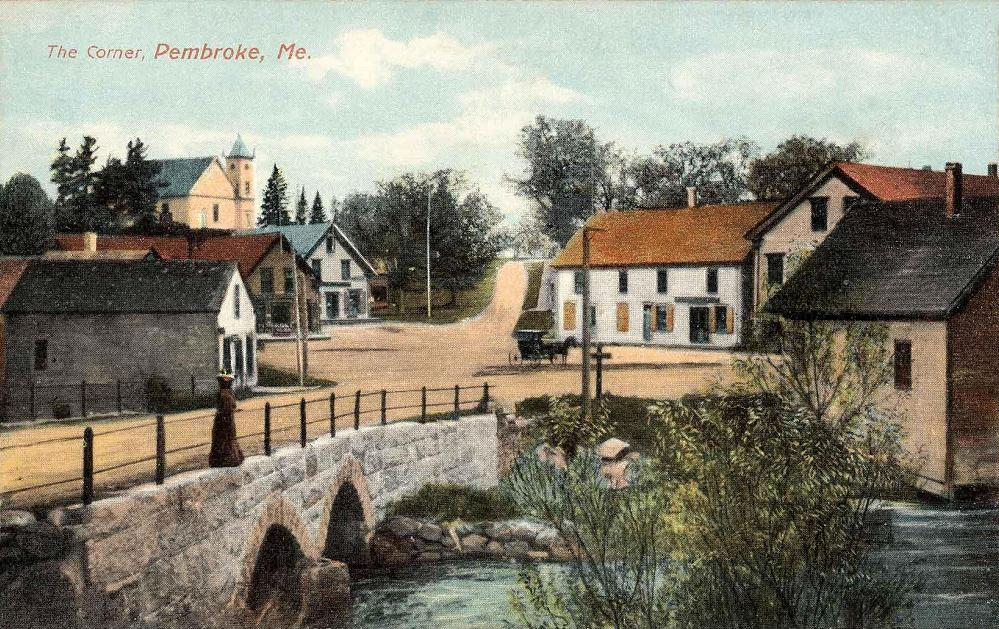
Union Square c. 1908

== Demographics ==
Historical population
Census	Pop.	Note	%±
1840	1,050		—
1850	1,712		63.0%
1860	2,299		34.3%
1870	2,551		11.0%
1880	2,324		−8.9%
1890	1,514		−34.9%
1900	1,652		9.1%
1910	1,378		−16.6%
1920	1,168		−15.2%
1930	965		−17.4%
1940	1,029		6.6%
1950	998		−3.0%
1960	871		−12.7%
1970	700		−19.6%
1980	920		31.4%
1990	852		−7.4%
2000	879		3.2%
2010	840		−4.4%
2020	788		−6.2%
U.S. Decennial Census

=== 2010 census ===
As of the census of 2010, there were 840 people, 358 households, and 236 families living in the town. The population density was 30.7 inhabitants per square mile (11.9/km^{2}). There were 531 housing units at an average density of 19.4 per square mile (7.5/km^{2}). The racial makeup of the town was 94.9% White, 0.1% African American, 1.3% Native American, 0.4% Asian, 0.2% from other races, and 3.1% from two or more races. Hispanic or Latino of any race were 1.0% of the population.

There were 358 households, of which 28.2% had children under the age of 18 living with them, 49.7% were married couples living together, 10.1% had a female householder with no husband present, 6.1% had a male householder with no wife present, and 34.1% were non-families. 27.4% of all households were made up of individuals, and 12% had someone living alone who was 65 years of age or older. The average household size was 2.30 and the average family size was 2.68.

The median age in the town was 48.5 years. 20.2% of residents were under the age of 18; 4.3% were between the ages of 18 and 24; 20.2% were from 25 to 44; 33% were from 45 to 64; and 22.3% were 65 years of age or older. The gender makeup of the town was 48.7% male and 51.3% female.

=== 2000 census ===
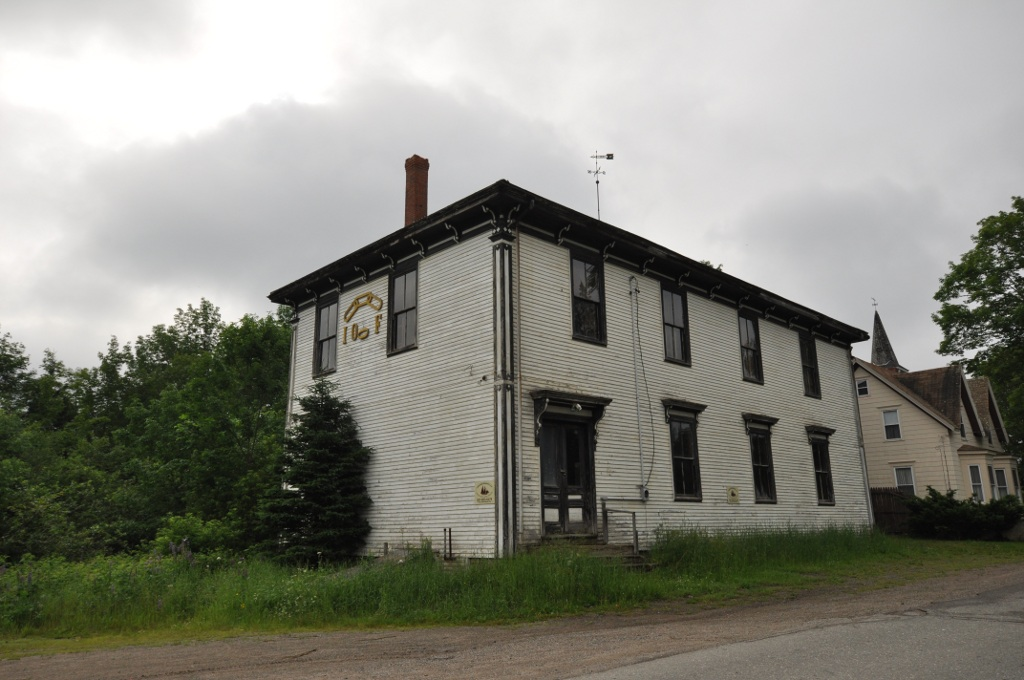
The old IOOF hall

As of the census of 2000, there were 879 people, 376 households, and 263 families living in the town. The population density was 32.1 inhabitants per square mile (12.4/km^{2}). There were 539 housing units at an average density of 19.7 per square mile (7.6/km^{2}). The racial makeup of the town was 96.93% White, 0.11% African American, 0.91% Native American, 0.46% Asian, and 1.59% from two or more races. Hispanic or Latino of any race were 0.46% of the population.

There were 376 households, out of which 27.9% had children under the age of 18 living with them, 57.4% were married couples living together, 8.8% had a female householder with no husband present, and 29.8% were non-families. 26.1% of all households were made up of individuals, and 13.3% had someone living alone who was 65 years of age or older. The average household size was 2.34 and the average family size was 2.75.

In the town, the population was spread out, with 22.6% under the age of 18, 4.9% from 18 to 24, 26.5% from 25 to 44, 26.3% from 45 to 64, and 19.7% who were 65 years of age or older. The median age was 42 years. For every 100 females, there were 89.4 males. For every 100 females age 18 and over, there were 89.4 males.

The median income for a household in the town was $23,365, and the median income for a family was $27,875. Males had a median income of $35,972 versus $21,544 for females. The per capita income for the town was $12,382. About 14.6% of families and 20.7% of the population were below the poverty line, including 24.2% of those under age 18 and 30.1% of those age 65 or over.

== Notable people ==
- Charles Best, co-discoverer of insulin
- Styles Bridges, governor of New Hampshire and U.S. senator
- Joseph Monninger, author and professor at Plymouth State University
- William Robinson Pattangall, Maine attorney general, chief justice of the Maine Supreme Court
