= Dennysville, Maine =

Town in Maine, United States

- Town
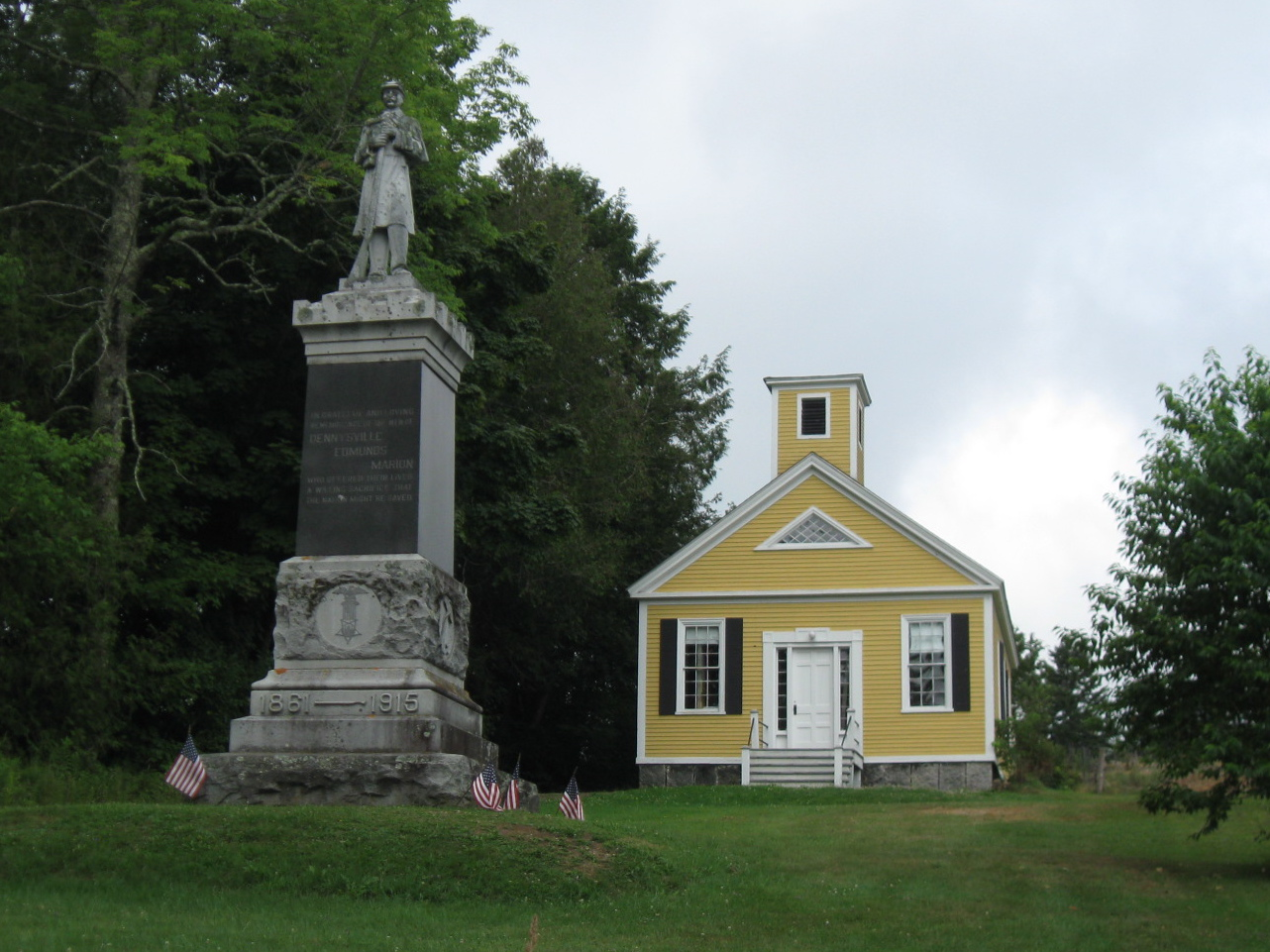
- Dennysville Historic District, Dennysville

- Location within Maine Location within the United States
- Coordinates: 44°55′46″N 67°14′40″W
- Country: United States
- State: Maine
- County: Washington

Area
  - Total: 15.28 sq mi (39.58 km^{2})
  - Land: 14.92 sq mi (38.64 km^{2})
  - Water: 0.36 sq mi (0.93 km^{2})
- Elevation: 154 ft (47 m)

Population (2020)
  - Total: 300
  - Density: 20/sq mi (7.8/km^{2})
- Time zone: UTC-5 (Eastern (EST))
  - Summer (DST): UTC-4 (EDT)
- ZIP code: 04628
- Area code: 207
- FIPS code: 23-17355
- GNIS feature ID: 582440

Dennysville is a town in Washington County, Maine, United States. The population was 300 at the 2020 census.

== History ==
Dennysville takes its name from the Dennys River. It was first settled by a group of sixteen men who came by boat from Hingham, Massachusetts. They arrived on the river shore on May 17, 1786.

== Geography ==
According to the United States Census Bureau, the town has a total area of 15.28 square miles (39.58 km^{2}), of which 14.92 square miles (38.64 km^{2}) is land and 0.36 square miles (0.93 km^{2}) is water.

== Demographics ==
Historical population
Census	Pop.	Note	%±
1820	557		—
1830	856		53.7%
1840	378		−55.8%
1850	458		21.2%
1860	485		5.9%
1870	488		0.6%
1880	522		7.0%
1890	452		−13.4%
1900	482		6.6%
1910	459		−4.8%
1920	434		−5.4%
1930	443		2.1%
1940	424		−4.3%
1950	345		−18.6%
1960	303		−12.2%
1970	278		−8.3%
1980	296		6.5%
1990	355		19.9%
2000	319		−10.1%
2010	342		7.2%
2020	300		−12.3%
U.S. Decennial Census

=== 2010 census ===
As of the census of 2010, there were 342 people, 154 households, and 96 families living in the town. The population density was 22.9 inhabitants per square mile (8.8/km^{2}). There were 189 housing units at an average density of 12.7 per square mile (4.9/km^{2}). The racial makeup of the town was 97.4% White, 0.6% Native American, and 2.0% from two or more races. Hispanic or Latino of any race were 1.8% of the population.

There were 154 households, of which 22.1% had children under the age of 18 living with them, 51.3% were married couples living together, 7.1% had a female householder with no husband present, 3.9% had a male householder with no wife present, and 37.7% were non-families. 33.8% of all households were made up of individuals, and 18.8% had someone living alone who was 65 years of age or older. The average household size was 2.22 and the average family size was 2.86.

The median age in the town was 48.6 years. 19.9% of residents were under the age of 18; 6.7% were between the ages of 18 and 24; 19.3% were from 25 to 44; 34.5% were from 45 to 64; and 19.6% were 65 years of age or older. The gender makeup of the town was 46.8% male and 53.2% female.

=== 2000 census ===
At the 2000 census, there were 319 people, 140 households and 95 families living in the town. The population density was 21.6 per square mile (8.3/km^{2}). There were 201 housing units at an average density of 13.6 per square mile (5.3/km^{2}). The racial makeup of the town was 99.37% White, and 0.63% from two or more races. Hispanic or Latino of any race were 0.31% of the population.

There were 140 households, of which 28.6% had children under the age of 18 living with them, 55.0% were married couples living together, 6.4% had a female householder with no husband present, and 32.1% were non-families. 30.7% of all households were made up of individuals, and 19.3% had someone living alone who was 65 years of age or older. The average household size was 2.28 and the average family size was 2.79.

24.1% of the population were under the age of 18, 7.5% from 18 to 24, 23.8% from 25 to 44, 24.1% from 45 to 64, and 20.4% who were 65 years of age or older. The median age was 41 years. For every 100 females, there were 92.2 males. For every 100 females age 18 and over, there were 90.6 males.

The median household income was $20,000 and the median family income was $28,750. Males had a median income of $27,292 versus $13,750 for females. The per capita income for the town was $13,336. About 20.8% of families and 23.6% of the population were below the poverty line, including 15.9% of those under age 18 and 29.5% of those age 65 or over.
