= Maine State Route 158 =

State highway in Aroostook County, Maine, US

State Route 158

Route information
- Maintained by MaineDOT
- Length: 4.44 mi (7.15 km)
- Existed: 1925–present

Major junctions
- West end: SR 11 in Sherman
- I-95 in Sherman
- East end: US 2 in Sherman

Location
- Country: United States
- State: Maine
- Counties: Aroostook

Highway system
- Maine State Highway System; Interstate; US; State; Auto trails; Lettered highways
← SR 157	→ SR 159

State Route 158 (SR 158) is part of Maine's system of numbered state highways, located entirely within the town of Sherman in Aroostook County. It is a short connector route running 4.42 miles (7.11 km) between SR 11 and U.S. Route 2 (US 2). The route is also known as Main Street and Woodbridge Corner Road.

== Route description ==
SR 158 begins at an intersection with SR 11 in Sherman, just west of Interstate 95 (I-95). The highway interchanges with I-95 at exit 264 and continues east. From there, the route heads through the town as Main Street until an intersection with Golden Ridge Road within the community of Sherman Mills. From this intersection, SR 158 continues Woodbridge Corner Road to its eastern terminus at US 2.

== History ==
SR 158, as designated in 1925, was a much longer route than it is today, stretching from its current eastern (then southern) terminus in Sherman all the way to Fort Kent. In the early 1930s, SR 11 was given its modern routing to Fort Kent, absorbing nearly all of SR 158 and leaving the short connector route in Sherman which exists today.

== Major intersections ==
The entire route is in Sherman, Aroostook County.

mi	km	Destinations	Notes
0.00	0.00	SR 11 (Grindstone / Station Roads) – Millinocket, Patten	
0.23– 0.39	0.37– 0.63	I-95 – Bangor, Houlton	I-95 exit 264
4.44	7.15	US 2 (Silver Ridge / Island Falls Roads) – Macwahoc, Island Falls	
1.000 mi = 1.609 km; 1.000 km = 0.621 mi
