= Maine State Route 217 =

State highway in Sagadahoc County, Maine, US

State Route 217
- Sebasco Road

Route information
- Maintained by MaineDOT
- Length: 1.2 mi (1.9 km)
- Existed: 1928–2007

Major junctions
- West end: Sebasco Road / Kenyon Road in Phippsburg
- East end: SR 209 in Phippsburg

Location
- Country: United States
- State: Maine
- Counties: Sagadahoc

Highway system
- Maine State Highway System; Interstate; US; State; Auto trails; Lettered highways
← SR 216	→ SR 218

State Route 217 (SR 217) was a short state highway in Maine, serving as a connection to the Sebasco Harbor Resort in Phippsburg. It was first designated in 1928, and had maintained its alignment since. Between January and March 2007, all signage for the highway was removed.

== Route description ==
SR 217 began at the intersection of Sebasco Road and Kenyon Road in the Phippsburg community of Sebasco Estates, near Sebasco Harbor Resort. The state route traveled south along Sebasco Road adjacent to a golf course before entering a wooded area with some houses surrounding the road. Passing Roundcove Lane, the road curves to the east to continue through the woodlands of the peninsula. After cresting a small ridge, the road winds its way around small hills to end at SR 209 in the community of Ashdale.

== Junction list ==
The entire route was in Phippsburg, Sagadahoc County.

mi	km	Destinations	Notes
0.0	0.0	Kenyon Road / Sebasco Road	
1.2	1.9	SR 209 (Main Road)	
1.000 mi = 1.609 km; 1.000 km = 0.621 mi
