= List of state routes in Maine =

State Routes in Maine
- Standard markers of State Routes in Maine

System information
- Maintained by MaineDOT

Highway names
- Interstates: Interstate x (abbreviated I-X)
- US Highways: U.S. Route x (abbreviated US-X)
- State: State Route x or Route x (abbreviated SR X)
- Lettered routes: Route x

System links
- Maine State Highway System; Interstate; US; State; Auto trails; Lettered highways

State routes in Maine are highways within the Maine State Highway System that are signed and maintained by the Maine Department of Transportation, and not U.S. Routes or routes of the Interstate Highway System. Some parts of these roads are maintained by local government authorities. There are over 100 State routes.

Note about termini: In several cases there is disagreement between the administrative termini of a route (which are defined by MaineDOT) and the termini signed in the field. All termini listed on this page are administrative termini; discrepancies are listed on the respective pages.

== Primary and secondary routes ==
Number	Length (mi)	Length (km)	Southern or western terminus	Northern or eastern terminus	Formed	Removed	Notes
SR 1	9.0	14.5	US 1 / SR 103 in Kittery	US 1A in York	1936	1940	Became part of SR 103 after US 1 was designated
SR 1	20.0	32.2	US 1 / SR 9 in Wells	US 1 / SR 9 in Biddeford	1940	1949	Proposed alternate for US 1 but was never approved by AASHTO. It was cosigned with SR 9 for its entire length.
SR 2	46.0	74.0	US 2 in Macwahoc	US 2 in Houlton	1939	1939	Shown on the 1939 map and 1939 route log, even though US 2A already existed by then
SR 3	120.67	194.20	SR 8 / SR 11 / SR 27 in Augusta	SR 102 / SR 198 in Mount Desert	1940	current	
SR 4	168.85	271.74	NH 4 in Rollinsford, NH	Haines Landing in Rangeley	1931	current	
SR 5	118.54	190.77	SR 9 in Old Orchard Beach	SR 120 in Andover	c. 1933	current	
SR 6	—	—	US 1	Old Orchard Beach	1937	c. 1946	Renumbered to SR 98
SR 6	207.23	333.50	Route 173 / US 201 near Saint-Théophile, QC (Armstrong–Jackman Border Crossing)	Route 4 near Saint Croix, NB (Saint Croix–Vanceboro Bridge)	1949	current	Only route with both termini at the Canada–US border
SR 7	61.90	99.62	US 1 / SR 3 / SR 137 in Belfast	SR 15 in Dover-Foxcroft	c. 1933	current	
SR 8	51.60	83.04	US 201 / SR 11 / SR 17 / SR 27 / SR 100 in Augusta	US 201 / US 201A in Solon	c. 1954	current	
SR 9	289.09	465.25	NH 9 / NH 236 in Somersworth, NH	Ferry Point International Bridge to St. Stephen, NB	c. 1933	current	
SR 10	9.28	14.93	US 1 in Presque Isle	US 1A in Easton	1940	current	Formerly US 1
SR 11	400.93	645.23	US 202 / NH 11 in Rochester, NH	US 1 / SR 161 in Fort Kent	1926	current	Longest state highway in Maine, state highway designation for former New England Route 11, extended to modern length in 1933-1934
SR 15	180.12	289.88	Main / West Main / School Streets in Stonington	US 201 / SR 6 in Jackman	1933	current	
SR 16	189.78	305.42	NH 16 in Wentworth Location, NH	US 2 in Orono	c. 1933	current	
SR 17	130.70	210.34	SR 4 in Rangeley	US 1 / US 1A in Rockland	c. 1933	current	
SR 18	54.15	87.15	NH 18 in Conway (now US 302)	US 1 in Portland (now SR 77)	1926	1935	State highway designation for former New England Route 18, redesignated US 302 in 1935
SR 22	19.48	31.35	SR 35 in Buxton	SR 25 / SR 77 in Portland	1939	current	
SR 23	68.53	110.29	SR 8 / SR 11 / SR 17 in Sidney	SR 6 / SR 15 / SR 16 in Guilford	1954	current	Originally part of a much longer SR 24
SR 24	43.99	70.80	Baileys Island Road in Harpswell	US 201 / SR 9 / SR 27 / SR 126 in Gardiner	c. 1933	current	
SR 25	42.38	68.20	NH 25 near Freedom, NH	SR 22 / SR 77 in Portland	1926	current	State highway designation for former New England Route 25 designated in 1925
SR 26	95.91	154.35	SR 77 in Portland	NH 26 in Cambridge, NH	1926	current	State highway designation for former New England Route 26 designated in 1925
SR 27	154.10	248.00	SR 238 in Southport	Route 161 near Saint-Augustin-de-Woburn, QC; Coburn Gore–Woburn Border Crossing)	1933	current	
SR 32	58.62	94.34	SR 130 in Bristol	US 201 / SR 100 / SR 137 Business in Winslow	1933	current	
SR 35	90.90	146.29	SR 9 / SR 9A in Kennebunk	US 2 / SR 5 in Bethel	c. 1933	current	
SR 37	9.25	14.89	SR 117 in Bridgton	SR 118 in Waterford	c. 1937	current	
SR 41	12.6	20.3	SR 41 in New Sharon	SR 43 in Starks	c. 1939	1946	renumbered as SR 134; former SR 134 renumbered as SR 41
SR 41	26.88	43.26	US 202 / SR 11 / SR 100 / SR 133 in Winthrop	US 2 / SR 27 / SR 156 in Farmington	c. 1946	current	Current SR 41 was originally designated SR 134 in 1928; designations were swapped in 1946-7
SR 43	102.71	165.30	Temple / Intervale / Cummings Hill Roads in Temple	US 2 / US 2A in Old Town	c. 1933	current	
SR 46	18.65	30.01	US 1 in Orland	SR 9 in Eddington	1960	current	Formerly part of SR 175
SR 47	1.45	2.33	SR 6 / SR 15 / SR 16 / SR 150 in Guilford	SR 23 in Sangerville	c. 1960	current	Unmarked internal designation for Pleasant Avenue/Hudson Avenue in Guilford and Sangerville
SR 50	0.9	1.4	I-95 in Orono	US 2A in Old Town	c. 1960	current	Unmarked internal designation for Stillwater Avenue at least from I-95 Exit 193 to US 2A
SR 52	17.19	27.66	US 1 in Camden	US 1 in Belfast	1960	current	Formerly part of SR 137
SR 69	34.62	55.72	SR 11 / SR 100 in Pittsfield	US 1A / SR 139 in Winterport	1959	current	
SR 73	10.68	17.19	SR 131 in St. George	US 1 in Rockland	1963	current	
SR 77	12.32	19.83	SR 207 in Scarborough	SR 22 / SR 25 in Portland	1939	current	
SR 85	7.91	12.73	US 302 / SR 35 in Raymond	SR 11 in Casco	1948	current	
SR 86	10.32	16.61	SR 191 near East Machias	US 1 in Dennysville	1962	current	
SR 88	8.41	13.53	US 1 in Falmouth	US 1 in Falmouth	c. 1946	current	Formerly US 1
SR 89	10.89	17.53	SR 161B / SR 164 in Caribou	US 1A in Limestone	c. 1946	current	
SR 90	10.83	17.43	US 1 in Warren	US 1 in Rockport	c. 1946	current	
SR 91	7.83	12.60	US 1 in York	SR 236 in South Berwick	1949	current	
SR 92	4.19	6.74	US 1 in Machias	Old County Road in Machiasport	1939	current	
SR 93	11.01	17.72	US 302 in Bridgton	SR 5 in Lovell	1953	current	
SR 94	13.35	21.48	SR 7 in Dexter	SR 11 / SR 43 in Corinth	1948	current	
SR 95	8.18	13.16	SR 25 in Gorham	SR 35 in Standish	c. 1946	1957	Renumbered SR 237 after the designation of I-95
SR 96	5.77	9.29	SR 27 in Boothbay Harbor	Middle Road in Boothbay	1948	current	
SR 97	9.53	15.34	SR 220 in Friendship	US 1 in Warren	1949	current	Formerly SR 220
SR 98	2.81	4.52	US 1 in Saco	SR 5 in Old Orchard Beach	c. 1946	current	
SR 99	8.76	14.10	SR 109 in Sanford	US 1 / SR 9A in Kennebunk	c. 1940	current	
SR 100	139.7	224.8	Cumberland Avenue in Portland	US 2 in Bangor	1925	current	First numbered state highway in Maine. Removed after statewide renumbering in 1926, then put back onto most of original routing in 1935. Old route from Augusta to Waterville now SR 11; section north of Newport now SR 7, SR 6/SR 16, SR 155, and SR 188.
SR 101	—	—	US 201 in Augusta	US 1 / US 1A in Rockland	1925	c. 1933	Became part of SR 17
SR 101	8.22	13.23	US 1 in Kittery	Gulf Road in Dover, NH	c. 1940	current	
SR 102	12.99	20.91	SR 102A in Tremont	SR 3 / SR 198 in Bar Harbor	1931	current	Original 1925 route is now part of SR 3; the modern alignment was first designated in 1931
SR 103	16.33	26.28	SR 236 in Eliot	US 1A in York	c. 1929	current	
SR 104	—	—	US 2 in Newport	Greenville Junction	1925	c. 1931	Became part of SR 100 and SR 105 (Now SR 7, SR 15, and SR 16)
SR 104	34.7	55.8	SR 8 / SR 11 / SR 27 in Augusta	US 2 / US 201 / US 201A in Skowhegan	1931	current	
SR 105	—	—	US 1A in Bangor	Greenville Junction	1925	c. 1933	Became part of SR 15
SR 105	48.11	77.43	US 201 / US 202 / SR 9 / SR 17 / SR 100 in Augusta	US 1 in Camden	c. 1933	current	
SR 106	—	—	US 1A in Brewer	SR 3 in Ellsworth	1925	c. 1933	Became part of SR 15
SR 106	14.15	22.77	US 202 / SR 11 / SR 100 in Leeds	SR 133 in Livermore Falls	c. 1937	current	
SR 107	—	—	SR 100 (now also US 202) in Auburn	Haines Landing	1925	c. 1933	Section east of Rangeley became part of SR 4 in 1931; remainder became part of SR 16 until 1951, when it too became part of SR 4.
SR 107	16.22	26.10	SR 11 / SR 113 in Baldwin	SR 117 in Bridgton	1936	current	
SR 108	26.69	42.95	US 2 in Rumford	SR 219 in Turner	1925	current	Current western alignment was first designated in 1929
SR 109	26.16	42.10	US 1 / SR 9 in Wells	NH 109 in Wakefield, NH	1925	current	
SR 110	3.60	5.79	Stevens Corner Road to NH 153 in Wakefield, NH	SR 11 in Newfield	1925	current	In 1931, the section from Alfred to East Waterboro became part of SR 4 (now US 202) and the former section between Limerick and Waterboro became part of former SR 205 (now SR 5), and SR 110 was extended west to the New Hampshire border in Newfield. Most of the remaining length became part of SR 11 in 1933.
SR 111	—	—	SR 110 (now US 202) in East Waterboro	SR 25 in Gorham	1925	c. 1931	Became part of SR 4
SR 111	13.88	22.34	US 202 / SR 4 / SR 4A in Alfred	SR 9 / SR 208 in Biddeford	c. 1933	current	Section from Alfred to US 1 in Biddeford was formerly SR 11 and originally part of New England Route 11 in 1925.
SR 112	25.9	41.7	US 1 / SR 5 / SR 9 in Saco	SR 114 in Gorham	1925	current	
SR 113	54.81	88.21	SR 25 in Standish	US 2 in Gilead	1925	current	6.0 miles (9.7 km) of the route run within New Hampshire. NH 113B is a loop of SR 113.
SR 114	35.04	56.39	US 1 / SR 9 / SR 207 in Scarborough	US 302 / SR 11 in Naples	1925	current	The section north of Scarborough was part of SR 207; the original section from there became part of SR 35 and SR 95 (now SR 237)
SR 115	18.04	29.03	US 302 / SR 35 in Windham	SR 88 in Yarmouth	1925	current	originally went on what is now US 202 (then SR 4) south of West Gray
SR 116	—	—	SR 18 (now US 302) in Naples	SR 121 in Mechanic Falls	1925	c. 1933	became part of SR 11
SR 116	56.42	90.80	SR 16 in Old Town	SR 11 / SR 157 in Medway	c. 1933	current	
SR 117	88.16	141.88	SR 112 in Saco	SR 219 in Turner	1925	current	
SR 118	13.04	20.99	SR 35 in Waterford	SR 117 / Main Street in Norway	1925	current	section north of North Waterford became SR 35 / SR 5; this alignment has since been bypassed
SR 119	—	—	SR 117 in Harrison	SR 118 in Waterford	1925	1933	Became part of SR 35
SR 119	15.2	24.5	SR 11 / SR 121 in Minot	SR 26 / SR 117 in Paris	1935	current	
SR 120	15.18	24.43	SR 5 in Andover	US 2 in Rumford	1925	current	
SR 121	35.76	57.55	US 302 / SR 35 in Raymond	US 202 / SR 4 / SR 11 / SR 100 in Auburn	1925	current	
SR 122	5.11	8.22	SR 26 in Poland	US 202 / SR 4 / SR 100 in Auburn	1925	current	
SR 123	13.66	21.98	Hurricane Ridge Road in Harpswell	SR 24 in Brunswick	1925	current	
SR 124	—	—	Bailey's Island	US 1 in Brunswick	1925	c. 1933	Became part of SR 24
SR 124	12.47	20.07	SR 11 / SR 121 in Mechanic Falls	SR 117 in Buckfield	c. 1933	current	
SR 125	22.12	35.60	US 1 / SR 136 in Freeport	SR 24 in Bowdoinham	1925	current	
SR 126	48.78	78.50	US 202 / SR 100 in Lewiston	SR 220 in Washington	1925	current	
SR 127	—	—	U.S. Route 201 in Gardiner	US 1 in Wiscasset	1925	c. 1933	Became part of SR 27
SR 127	25.64	41.26	Seguinland Road in Georgetown	SR 27 / SR 197 in Dresden	c. 1933	current	
SR 128	—	—	US 1 in Wiscasset	Boothbay Harbor	1925	c. 1933	Became part of SR 27
SR 128	15.36	24.72	SR 127 in Woolwich	SR 27 in Dresden	c. 1933	current	
SR 129	13.36	21.50	Middle Road in South Bristol	US 1 Bus. / SR 130 in Damariscotta	1925	current	
SR 130	14.41	23.19	Pemaquid Loop Road in Bristol	US 1 Bus. / SR 129 in Damariscotta	1925	current	
SR 131	58.63	94.36	Drift Inn / Glenmere Roads in St. George	SR 141 in Swanville	1925	current	
SR 132	—	—	SR 101 (now SR 17) in Jefferson	US 1 in Waldoboro	1925	c. 1933	Became part of SR 32
SR 132	10.8	17.4	SR 9 / SR 126 in Sabattus	US 202 / SR 11 / SR 100 in Monmouth	c. 1937	current	
SR 133	31.78	51.14	US 202 / SR 11 / SR 41 / SR 100 in Winthrop	US 2 / SR 4 in Farmington	1925	current	
SR 134	26.96	43.39	US 202 / SR 11 / SR 100 / SR 133 in Winthrop	US 2 / SR 27 / SR 156 in Farmington	1925	c. 1946	Renumbered as SR 41; old SR 41 renumbered as SR 134
SR 134	12.6	20.3	SR 41 in New Sharon	SR 43 in Starks	c. 1946	current	
SR 135	23.48	37.79	SR 132 in Monmouth	SR 8 / SR 11 in Belgrade	1925	current	
SR 136	23.48	37.79	SR 100 (now SR 11) in Oakland	US 2 in Norridgewock	1925	c. 1933	became part of SR 137
SR 136	19.17	30.85	US 1 / SR 125 in Freeport	US 202 / SR 11 / SR 100 in Auburn	c. 1933	current	
SR 137	56.25	90.53	US 2 in Mercer	US 1 / SR 3 / SR 7 in Belfast	1925	current	
SR 138	—	—	US 201 in Augusta	US 1 in Hampden	1925	c. 1933	became part of SR 9 (now also US 202)
SR 138	9.53	15.34	US 201 in Bowdoin	US 201 in Richmond	c. 1946	current	Originally designated SR 201 in 1937; renumbered in 1946-7
SR 139	58.83	94.68	US 2 / US 201A / SR 8 in Norridgewock	US 1A / SR 69 in Winterport	1925	current	
SR 140	—	—	SR 100 (now SR 8/ SR 11) in Belgrade	US 2 in New Sharon	1925	c. 1933	became part of SR 27
SR 140	22.4	36.0	SR 117 in Buckfield	SR 4 / SR 17 in Jay	c. 1933	current	
SR 141	13.22	21.28	US 1 / SR 3 in Belfast	SR 139 in Monroe	1925	current	
SR 142	43.29	69.67	US 2 / SR 17 in Dixfield	SR 16 / SR 27 in Kingfield	1925	current	
SR 143	—	—	SR 107 (now SR 4/ SR 27) in Fairbanks	Eustis	1925	c. 1933	outside Eustis became part of SR 4 in 1931; remainder became part of SR 27
SR 143	15.25	24.54	US 202 / SR 9 in Dixmont	SR 222 in Stetson	c. 1937	current	
SR 144	—	—	SR 107 (now SR 4) in Rangeley	US 201 (now US 201A) in North Anson	1925	c. 1933	Became part of SR 16
SR 144	—	—	SR 16 in Oquossoc	Haines Landing	1937	c. 1951	Became part of SR 4
SR 144	8.42	13.55	West Shore Road in Westport	US 1 in Wiscasset	1954	current	
SR 145	10.15	16.33	SR 4 in Strong	SR 142 near Kingfield	1925	current	
SR 146	6.33	10.19	SR 27 in New Portland	SR 16 in New Portland	1925	current	
SR 147	15.0	24.1	US 2 / US 201 in Skowhegan	US 201 in Solon	1925	1954	Redesignated US 201 after the designation of US 201A in 1954
SR 148	19.22	30.93	SR 43 in Industry	US 201 in Madison	1925	current	Western segment formerly SR 43A
SR 149	—	—	US 201 in Bingham	US 201 in Abbot	1925	1933	Became part of SR 16
SR 149	—	—	SR 27 north of Eustis	SR 16 (now submerged) in Flagstaff	1933	1949	Cancelled and road partially submerged when the Flagstaff Dam and Flagstaff Lake were constructed
SR 149	16.08	25.88	SR 4 in Strong	SR 142 in Phillips	1951	current	
SR 150	50.81	81.77	US 2 in Skowhegan	Sebec Lake in Willimantic	1925	current	
SR 151	30.45	49.00	US 2 in Palmyra	SR 16 near Wellington	1925	current	
SR 152	20.31	32.69	SR 11 / SR 100 in Pittsfield	SR 150 in Cambridge	1925	current	
SR 153	—	—	SR 152 north of St. Albans	SR 100 (now SR 7) in Dexter	1925	1933	Became part of SR 24 (this section now part of SR 23)
SR 153	4.66	7.50	SR 6 / SR 16 in Dover-Foxcroft	Greeley's Landing in Dover-Foxcroft	c. 1933	current	
SR 154	—	—	SR 104 (now SR 6 / SR 16 and SR 15) in Dover-Foxcroft	US 2 in West Enfield	1925	1931	Became part of SR 100 (now also part of SR 6)
SR 154	20.21	32.52	SR 151 near Wellington	SR 23 in Ripley	c. 1933	current	
SR 155	—	—	SR 6 in LaGrange	US 2 in Orono	1925	1955	Became part of SR 16; number reused on intersecting route
SR 155	34.41	55.38	SR 11 / SR 221 in Bradford	US 2 / SR 6 in Lincoln	1955	current	
SR 156	—	—	SR 155 in LaGrange	US 2 in West Enfield	1925	1929	Became part of SR 154 (later SR 100, now SR 6/SR 155)
SR 156	23.16	37.27	SR 142 in Weld	SR 41 in Chesterville	1929	current	
SR 157	22.46	36.15	SR 11 in Millinocket	US 2 in Mattawamkeag	1925	current	
SR 158	4.42	7.11	SR 11 in Sherman	US 2 in Sherman	1925	current	
SR 159	20.68	33.28	Shin Pond Village in Mt. Chase	US 2 in Island Falls	1925	current	
SR 160	—	—	SR 5 in Limerick	US 1 in Fort Kent	1925	1933	became part of SR 161
SR 160	32.64	52.53	SR 5 in Limerick	SR 117 in Denmark	1933	current	
SR 161	83.03	133.62	Route 190 in Carlingford, NB (Fort Fairfield–Andover Border Crossing)	Frank Mack Road in Allagash	1925	current	
SR 162	16.97	27.31	SR 161 near St. Agatha	US 1 in Frenchville	1925	current	
SR 163	29.22	47.03	SR 11 in Ashland	SR 167 in Presque Isle	1925	current	
SR 164	23.63	38.03	US 1 in Presque Isle	US 1 in Caribou	1925	current	
SR 165	—	—	US 1 in Easton	US 1A in Fort Fairfield	1925	1983	Redesignated US 1A in 1983
SR 166	46.0	74.0	US 2 in Macwahoc	US 2 in Macwahoc	1925	1936	Redesignated US 2A in 1936
SR 166	7.34	11.81	Main Street in Castine	SR 175 in Penobscot	c. 1940	current	Originally designated SR 202 in 1925; renumbered SR 166E in 1939, then SR 166 in 1940-1
SR 167	—	—	US 2 in Lincoln	Canada border in Vanceboro	1925	1933	Became part of SR 16 (now SR 6)
SR 167	12.98	20.89	US 1 in Presque Isle	US 1A in Fort Fairfield	1936	current	
SR 168	10.18	16.38	SR 6 in Lee	US 2 in Winn	1925	current	
SR 169	24.22	38.98	SR 6 / SR 170 in Springfield	US 1 in Danforth	1925	current	
SR 170	20.37	32.78	SR 6 / SR 169 in Springfield	US 2 in Macwahoc	1925	current	
SR 171	17.83	28.69	SR 169 in Prentiss	US 2A in Reed Plantation	1925	current	
SR 172	—	—	US 2 in West Enfield	Grand Falls Road east of Burlington	1925	1931	Became part of SR 100 (now SR 188 and SR 155)
SR 172	22.66	36.47	SR 175 in Sedgwick	US 1 / SR 3 in Ellsworth	c. 1933	current	
SR 173	—	—	US 2 in West Enfield	SR 11 (now SR 155 near Enfield	1925	1951	Became part of SR 188
SR 173	21.03	33.84	US 1 in Lincolnville	SR 220 in Liberty	1953	current	
SR 174	—	—	SR 106 (now SR 15) in East Orland	SR 106 (now SR 172) in Ellsworth	1925	1931	Became part of SR 102; this section became part of SR 3 in 1933, and is now part of US 1
SR 174	3.8	6.1	US 1A in Prospect	US 1 / SR 3 in Prospect	1931	current	
SR 175	46.16	74.29	SR 15 / SR 172 / SR 176 in Blue Hill	US 1 / SR 3 / SR 15 in Orland	1925	current	
SR 176	38.27	61.59	SR 175 in Brooksville	US 1 / SR 3 in Orland	1925	current	
SR 177	6.98	11.23	SR 175 in Penobscot	SR 15 / SR 172 / SR 176 in Blue Hill	1925	current	
SR 178	13.27	21.36	State Street / SR 9 in Brewer	US 2 in Milford	1925	current	
SR 179	22.34	35.95	US 1A in Ellsworth	SR 9 in Aurora	1925	current	
SR 180	20.1	32.3	US 1A in Ellsworth	SR 9 in Clifton	1925	current	
SR 181	12.46	20.05	SR 180 in Otis	SR 9 in Amherst	1925	current	
SR 182	23.5	37.8	US 1 in Hancock	US 1 in Cherryfield	1925	current	
SR 183	—	—	US 1 in Ellsworth	SR 198 in Town Hill	1925	1931	Became part of SR 102; this section became part of SR 3 in 1933, and is now part of US 1
SR 183	5.45	8.77	US 1 in Sullivan	Schoodic Beach Road in Sullivan	c. 1937	current	
SR 184	8.64	13.90	Lamoine Beach in Lamoine	US 1 in Ellsworth	1925	current	
SR 185	3.69	5.94	Waukeag Avenue in Sorrento	US 1 in Sullivan	1925	current	
SR 186	16.13	25.96	US 1 in Gouldsboro	US 1 in Gouldsboro	1925	current	
SR 187	22.85	36.77	US 1 in Columbia Falls	US 1 in Jonesboro	1925	current	
SR 188	—	—	US 1 in East Machias	Cutler	1925	1933	Became part of SR 191
SR 188	15.6	25.1	SR 155 in Enfield	Lord Brook Road near Burlington	c. 1933	current	
SR 189	11.19	18.01	US 1 in Whiting	Route 774 on Campobello Island, NB (Franklin D. Roosevelt Bridge)	1925	current	
SR 190	7.09	11.41	Water Street in Eastport	US 1 in Perry	1925	current	
SR 191	61.58	99.10	SR 189 in Lubec	US 1 / SR 9 near Baileyville	1925	current	
SR 192	20.39	32.81	US 1 in Machias	SR 9 in Wesley	1925	current	
SR 193	—	—	SR 179 (Now SR 9) in East Eddington	US 1 in East Holden	1925	1933	Became part of SR 175 (which has since shifted to the east, and later, that section was renumbered SR 46)
SR 193	19.11	30.75	US 1 in Cherryfield	SR 9 near Beddington	c. 1933	current	
SR 194	—	—	New England Interstate 24 (now SR 10) and SR 165 (now US 1A) in Easton Center	Canada	1925	1933	
SR 194	—	—	SR 17 in West Rockport	US 1 in Rockport	1933	1949	Became part of SR 90 in 1948, but overlapped SR 90 for a year before decommissioning
SR 194	16.68	26.84	SR 27 in Pittston	SR 215 in Newcastle	1951	current	
SR 195	—	—	US 201 in Jackman	SR 15 in Rockwood	1925	1940	Became part of SR 15 (now SR 6/SR 15)
SR 195	8.99	14.47	Crowley Island Road in Gouldsboro	US 1 in Gouldsboro	c. 1946	current	Duplicate number; not renumbered after I-195 was opened in 1983
SR 196	19.42	31.25	US 202 / SR 11 / SR 100 in Lewiston	US 1 in Brunswick	1925	current	
SR 197	20.52	33.02	SR 9 / SR 126 in Sabattus	SR 27 / SR 127 in Dresden	1925	current	
SR 198	10.79	17.36	Main Street in Mount Desert	SR 3 in Bar Harbor	1925	current	
SR 199	10.57	17.01	SR 166 in Castine	SR 15 in Penobscot	1925	current	
SR 200	17.97	28.92	US 1 in Sullivan	SR 179 in Waltham	1925	current	
SR 201	—	—	SR 18 (now US 302) in Naples	SR 117 in Harrison	1925	1926	Renumbered SR 213 (which became part of SR 35 in 1933) because of the creation of US 201
SR 201	9.53	15.34	US 201 in Bowdoin	US 201 in Richmond	c. 1937	c. 1946	Proposed alternate for US 201 but was never approved by AASHTO; renumbered SR 138 in 1946-7
SR 202	—	—	Main Street in Castine	SR 175 in Castine (now SR 166 / SR 199)	1925	1939	After US 202 was designated; SR 202 was renumbered SR 166E in 1939, then to SR 166 in 1940-1
SR 203	—	—	SR 185 in Sorrento	Downtown Sorrento	1925	1928	Became part of SR 185
SR 203	—	—	SR 110 in West Newfield	New Hampshire	1928	1949	Section from SR 109 to SR 110 became part of SR 11 in 1933
SR 203	4.62	7.44	SR 131 in Waldo	SR 139 in Brooks	c. 1950	2023	on a 1950 map, but did not appear in route logs until 1953
SR 204	—	—	SR 218 (now SR 9) in Kennebunkport	US 1 in Kennebunk	1925	1933	Became part of SR 35 and SR 9A
SR 204	6.5	10.5	SR 3 in Trenton	Seal Point / Marlboro Beach Roads in Lamoine	1936	current	
SR 205	—	—	SR 25 in Cornish	US 1 in West Scarborough	1925	1933	Became part of SR 5 and SR 9
SR 205	10.79	17.36	SR 167 in Presque Isle	SR 161 in Caribou	c. 1937	current	
SR 206	—	—	SR 155 (now SR 16) west of Old Town	US 2 in Old Town	1925	1933	Became part of SR 43
SR 206	1.6	2.6	SR 17 in Washington	SR 105 in Washington	c. 1933	current	
SR 207	2.94	4.73	SR 77 in Scarborough	US 1 / SR 9 / SR 114 in Scarborough	1925	current	
SR 208	7.29	11.73	Lester B. Orcutt Blvd. in Biddeford	SR 9 / SR 111 in Biddeford	1925	current	Mostly overlapped by SR 9
SR 209	16.03	25.80	Popham Beach in Phippsburg	US 1 in Bath	1925	current	
SR 210	6.20	9.98	US 1 / SR 164 in Presque Isle	US 1 in Presque Isle	1925	c. 2007	All signage removed as of October 2007
SR 211	—	—	SR 157 in Medway	SR 158 in Medway	c. 1925	1933	Became part of SR 11
SR 211	6.7	10.8	SR 41 in Mount Vernon	SR 27 in Belgrade	c. 1933	1957	
SR 212	10.28	16.54	SR 11 in Moro Plantation	US 2 in Smyrna	1925	current	
SR 213	—	—	SR 18 (now US 302) in Naples	SR 117 in Harrison	1926	1933	Became part of SR 35
SR 213	9.35	15.05	SR 215 in Newcastle	SR 126 in Jefferson	c. 1933	current	
SR 214	—	—	SR 9 in North Berwick	SR 109 in Sanford	1928	1931	Became part of SR 4
SR 214	9.96	16.03	SR 191 in Meddybemps	US 1 in Pembroke	c. 1933	current	
SR 215	—	—	SR 134 in Readfield	SR 100 (now also US 202 and SR 11 in Manchester	1928	1933	Became part of SR 17
SR 215	17.43	28.05	US 1 Bus. in Newcastle	SR 32 in Jefferson	c. 1933	current	
SR 216	2.3	3.7	Small Point in Phippsburg	SR 209 in Phippsburg	1928	current	
SR 217	1.22	1.96	Kenyon / Sebasco Roads in Phippsburg	SR 209 in Phippsburg	1928	2007	Designation of Sebasco Road between Kenyon Road and SR 209; all signage was removed as of March 2007
SR 218	—	—	US 1 in Elms	SR 204 (now SR 35 and SR 9A) in Kennebunkport	1928	1933	Became part of SR 9
SR 218	20.96	33.73	US 1 / SR 27 in Wiscasset	SR 17 / SR 32 in Whitefield	c. 1933	current	
SR 219	—	—	US 2 in Rumford Point	South Arm	1928	1933	Became part of SR 5 (which was later decommissioned north of Andover)
SR 219	35.1	56.5	Greenwood Road in Greenwood	SR 133 in Wayne	c. 1933	current	
SR 220	66.66	107.28	SR 97 in Friendship	SR 11 / SR 100 in Palmyra	1929	current	
SR 221	16.05	25.83	SR 15 in Bangor	SR 11 / SR 155 in Bradford	c. 1931	current	
SR 222	—	—	US 1 in Caribou	Canada border	1931	1933	Became part of SR 161
SR 222	27.65	44.50	SR 7 / SR 11 / SR 43 in Corinna	US 2 / SR 100 in Bangor	1936	current	
SR 223	6.45	10.38	SR 89 in Caribou	US 1A in Limestone	c. 1931	current	
SR 224	—	—	SR 100 (now SR 7) in Dexter	SR 105 in Guilford (now SR 6/SR 15/SR 16)	1931	1933	Became part of SR 24 (this section now part of SR 23)
SR 224	2.09	3.36	SR 11 / SR 11A / SR 109 in Sanford	US 202 / SR 4A in Sanford	c. 1933	current	
SR 225	5.65	9.09	SR 27 in Rome	SR 8 / SR 137 in Smithfield	1932	current	
SR 226	5.50	8.85	SR 27 / SR 126 in Randolph	SR 17 in Chelsea	1934	current	
SR 227	24.51	39.45	SR 11 in Ashland	SR 163 in Presque Isle	c. 1939	current	
SR 228	16.93	27.25	SR 164 in Washburn	SR 161B in Caribou	c. 1939	current	
SR 229	1.96	3.15	US 1A in Limestone	Route 375 in Grand-Sault, NB (Limestone–Gillespie Portage Border Crossing)	c. 1939	current	
SR 230	14.24	22.92	SR 3 in Trenton	US 1 / SR 3 in Ellsworth	c. 1946	current	
SR 231	11.52	18.54	SR 115 in North Yarmouth	US 202 / SR 4 / SR 100 in New Gloucester	1954	current	
SR 232	9.3	15.0	SR 26 in Woodstock	US 2 in Rumford	1955	current	
SR 233	5.85	9.41	SR 3 / SR 198 in Mount Desert	SR 3 in Bar Harbor	1956	current	
SR 234	18.67	30.05	SR 145 / SR 149 in Strong	US 201A / SR 8 in Anson	1956	current	
SR 235	23.71	38.16	US 1 in Waldoboro	SR 52 / SR 173 in Lincolnville	1957	current	
SR 236	15.8	25.4	SR 103 in Kittery	SR 9 in Berwick	1957	current	
SR 237	8.18	13.16	SR 25 in Gorham	SR 35 in Standish	1957	current	Originally designated SR 95 in 1946-7; renumbered SR 237 after I-95 was designated in 1957
SR 238	3.76	6.05	SR 27 in Southport	SR 27 in Southport	1975	current	
SR 701	1.77	2.85	US 1 / SR 9 in Scarborough	I-295 in South Portland	—	—	Scarborough Connector; posted on mile markers every 0.2 miles (0.32 km) with an origin point at the northern end
SR 703	1.91	3.07	I-95 in South Portland	US 1 / SR 9 in South Portland	c. 2004	current	Maine Turnpike Approach Road, also known as the Maine Mall Connector; posted on mile markers every 0.2 miles (0.32 km) with an origin point at the western end
Former

== Special routes ==
Number	Length (mi)	Length (km)	Southern or western terminus	Northern or eastern terminus	Formed	Removed	Notes
SR 4A	6.5	10.5	SR 4 / SR 109 in Sanford	US 202 / SR 4 / SR 111 in Alfred	c. 1946	current	Southern segment
SR 4A	4.0	6.4	US 202 / SR 4 / SR 35 in Hollis	US 202 / SR 4 in Buxton	c. 1937	current	Northern segment
SR 5A	2.1	3.4	SR 5 in Lovell	SR 5 in Lovell	1960	c. 2003	
SR 9A	11.28	18.15	SR 9 in Wells	SR 9 / SR 35 in Kennebunk	c. 1933	current	
SR 9B	4.14	6.66	SR 9 in Wells	US 1 in Wells	c. 1933	current	
SR 11A	3.3	5.3	US 202 / SR 11 in Sanford	SR 11 / SR 109 / SR 224 in Sanford	1931	current	Southern segment
SR 11A	6.7	10.8	SR 11 in Charleston	SR 11 / SR 221 in Bradford	c. 1980	current	Northern segment; formerly SR 11
SR 11B	0.3	0.48	SR 11 / SR 157 in Millinocket	SR 11 in Millinocket	—	—	
SR 15 Bus.	2.8	4.5	I-395 / SR 15 / SR 9 in Brewer	I-95 / SR 15 in Bangor	2004	current	Formerly SR 15
SR 15A	—	—	SR 15 in Corinth	SR 15 in Charleston	1950	1960	Redesignated SR 15 in 1960
SR 24 Bus.	4.3	6.9	SR 24 in Brunswick	SR 24 in Topsham	2014	current	Formerly SR 24
SR 25 Bus.	2.8	4.5	SR 25 in Westbrook	SR 25 in Portland	c. 1977	current	Formerly SR 25
SR 26A	1.6	2.6	US 202 / SR 4 / SR 26 / SR 100 / SR 115 in Gray	SR 26 in Gray	2006	2023	Redesignated as SR 26
SR 35A	4.7	7.6	SR 35 in Standish	SR 25 / SR 35 in Standish	c. 1937	c. 2002	Formerly SR 35; now unnumbered Cape Road west of SR 25
SR 43A	11.3	18.2	SR 43 in Industry	SR 43 in Anson	1936	c. 1946	Renumbered as an extension of SR 148 in 1946-7
SR 100A	5.1	8.2	US 201 / SR 100 / SR 137 in Winslow	SR 100 / SR 139 in Benton	—	—	
SR 102A	6.7	10.8	SR 102 in Tremont	SR 102 in Southwest Harbor	—	—	
NH 113B	1.0	1.6	SR 113 in Stow	SR 113 in Stow	—	—	Despite NH Route designation, loop of SR 113. Of the route's total 3.95 miles (6.36 km), 1.0 mile exist in Maine
SR 137 Bus.	3.01	4.84	SR 137 in Winslow	SR 11 / SR 104 / SR 137 in Waterville	1997	current	Formerly SR 137
SR 161B	3.62	5.83	US 1 / SR 161 in Caribou	SR 161 in Caribou	2012	current	Formerly SR 161, business route designation
SR 166A	3.77	6.07	SR 166 in Castine	SR 166 in Castine	c. 1946	current	Originally designated SR 166W; renumbered in 1946-7
SR 172A	11.3	18.2	SR 172 in Stonington (now SR 15)	SR 172 in Deer Isle (now SR 15)	c. 1940	1963	Decommissioned when SR 172 was truncated in 1963; now unnumbered roads
SR 228T	0.60	0.97	SR 164 in Washburn	SR 228 in Washburn	1964	current	Only truck route ever designated in Maine
SR 9 Bus.	12.9	20.8	US 202 / SR 9 in Hampden	SR 9 in Eddington	2025	current	Newest state highway designation in Maine; formerly SR 9
Former

== Routes crossing state borders ==
New Hampshire Route 113B and New Hampshire Route 153 enter Maine. NH 153 remains entirely under NHDOT maintenance. NH 113B is a loop of Maine State Route 113. The spans of NH 113B within Maine are considered unnumbered highway by the MDOT. SR 113 enters New Hampshire several times but remains under MDOT maintenance.

New England Interstates

- New England Route 1
- New England Route 9
- New England Route 11
- New England Route 15
- New England Route 18
- New England Route 19
- New England Route 20
- New England Route 24
- New England Route 25
- New England Route 26
