= Maine State Route 134 =

State highway in Maine, US

State Route 134

Route information
- Maintained by MaineDOT
- Length: 12.53 mi (20.17 km)

Major junctions
- South end: SR 41 near New Sharon
- US 2 / SR 27 in New Sharon
- North end: SR 43 in Starks

Location
- Country: United States
- State: Maine

Highway system
- Maine State Highway System; Interstate; US; State; Auto trails; Lettered highways
← SR 133	→ SR 135

State Route 134 (abbreviated SR 134) is a north–south route in the U.S. State of Maine that connects SR 41 and its southern points, such as Winthrop, with SR 43 and its northern points, such as Anson. SR 134 intersects U.S. Route 2 (US 2) and SR 27 in the town of New Sharon. Before circa 1946, it was known as SR 41, while the current SR 41 was known as SR 134.

== Major intersections ==
County	Location	mi	km	Destinations	Notes
Franklin	New Sharon	0.00	0.00	SR 41 (Vienna Road) – Farmington, Mount Vernon	
Franklin	New Sharon	3.89	6.26	US 2 east / SR 27 south (Mercer Road) – Norridgewock	Southern end of concurrency with US 2 / SR 27
Franklin	New Sharon	4.10	6.60	US 2 west / SR 27 north (Farmington Falls Road) / Water Street – Farmington	Northern end of concurrency with US 2 / SR 27
Somerset	Starks	12.53	20.17	SR 43 (Industry Road) – Farmington, Starks	
1.000 mi = 1.609 km; 1.000 km = 0.621 mi: Concurrency terminus
