= U.S. Route 2 in Maine =

State highway in central Maine, US

U.S. Route 2
- US 2 highlighted in red

Route information
- Maintained by MaineDOT
- Length: 273.21 mi (439.69 km)

Major junctions
- West end: US 2 at the New Hampshire state line in Gilead
- US 201 / US 201A in Skowhegan; SR 7 / SR 11 / SR 100 in Newport; I-95 / I-395 / SR 15 in Bangor; US 2A in Orono / Old Town; I-95 in Smyrna; US 1 / US 2A in Houlton
- East end: I-95 in Houlton

Location
- Country: United States
- State: Maine
- Counties: Oxford, Franklin, Somerset, Penobscot, Aroostook

Highway system
- United States Numbered Highway System; List; Special; Divided; Maine State Highway System; Interstate; US; State; Auto trails; Lettered highways
← US 1A	→ US 2A
← Route 14	N.E.	→ Route 16

U.S. Route 2 (US 2) in the U.S. state of Maine is a principal east–west route through the central portion of the state, extending from the New Hampshire border in Gilead to the town of Houlton less than a quarter mile from the Canadian border.

== Route description ==
After crossing the New Hampshire state line in Gilead, US 2 continues to follow the Androscoggin River, turning north in Bethel (State Route 26 [SR 26] continues eastward from this turn). From there, the road crosses the river and turns north for a short while before turning eastward again, following the curving path of the river on the opposite bank until Dixfield, where it turns northeast, crossing from Oxford County, through southeastern Franklin County and into Somerset County. The road has a major junction with US 201 in Skowhegan, continuing to Penobscot County and the town of Newport, where the road begins a loosely parallel path with Interstate 95 (I-95), interchanging with the interstate just southeast of Bangor International Airport in Bangor.

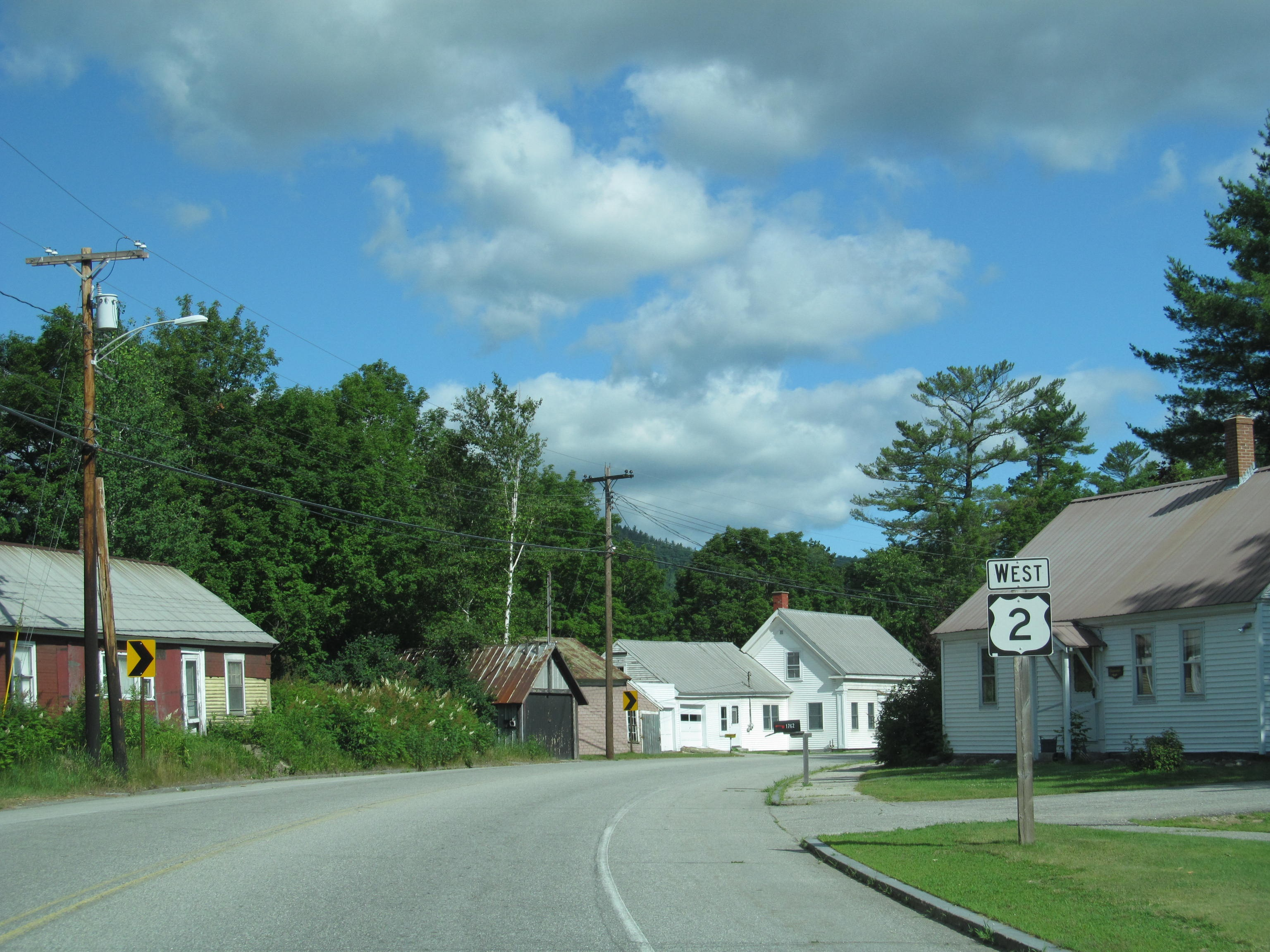
US 2 in Rumford Point

From Bangor, the road begins following the Penobscot River northward, passing through Orono, crossing the river just south of the main campus of the University of Maine on Marsh Island. In Old Town, the road crosses the river again, staying to the east bank of the river through Mattawamkeag, crossing the Mattawamkeag River, then heading northward through the rest of the county and into Aroostook County, heading due north from Macwahoc, eventually meeting up again with I-95 near exit 286 in Oakfield, before crossing back at exit 291 in Smyrna. From Smyrna, the road travels due east into Houlton, sharing a concurrency with US 1 for just under one-half mile (0.80 km) before heading east and terminating just north of Houlton International Airport at I-95 exit 305, the last exit before it changes to Route 95.

== History ==
The original path of the road near the Houlton Airport did not turn around what is now the north–south runway, instead going straight on what is now Old Woodstock Road, over the eventual path of the runway, and crossing Airport Drive just south of the exit, meeting at the old U.S. Customs station, 200 yards (180 m) due south of the current one. The corresponding Canadian road also has closed, ending 0.4 miles (0.64 km) further from the border than it once did. The roadway paths are still visible on satellite imagery.

== Major intersections ==
County	Location	mi	km	Destinations	Notes
Oxford	Gilead	0.00	0.00	US 2 west – Gorham	Continuation into New Hampshire
Oxford	Gilead	2.22	3.57	SR 113 south – Evans Notch	Northern terminus of SR 113
Oxford	Bethel	11.87	19.10	SR 5 south / SR 35 south (Lovers Lane) – Waterford	Western end of concurrency with SR 5; northern terminus of SR 35
Oxford	Bethel	12.20	19.63	SR 26 south – Bethel, South Paris	Western end of concurrency with SR 26
Oxford	Bethel	12.77	20.55	Androscoggin River	
Oxford	Newry	17.99	28.95	Bear River	
Oxford	Newry	18.05	29.05	SR 26 north (Bear River Road) – Upton, Errol NH	Eastern end of concurrency with SR 26
Oxford	Rumford	24.24	39.01	SR 5 north (Ellis River Road) – Andover, South Arm	Eastern end of concurrency with SR 5
Oxford	Rumford	24.81	39.93	SR 232 – Bryant Pond, South Paris	Northern terminus of SR 232
Oxford	Rumford	34.39	55.35	SR 108 (Bridge Street) – Canton, Dixfield	Western terminus of SR 108
Oxford	Rumford	35.21	56.67	SR 120 west (Hancock Street) – Andover	Eastern terminus of SR 120
Oxford	Mexico	35.66	57.39	SR 17 north – Rangeley, Scenic Highway	Western end of concurrency with SR 17
Oxford	Dixfield	40.61	65.36	SR 142 – Mount Blue State Park, Weld	Southern terminus of SR 142
Franklin	No major junctions				
Oxford	No major junctions				
Franklin	Wilton	52.61	84.67	SR 17 south to SR 4 south – North Jay	Eastern end of concurrency with SR 17
Franklin	Wilton	57.40	92.38	SR 4 south – Livermore Falls, Jay, Auburn	Western end of concurrency with SR 4
Franklin	Wilton	58.33	93.87	SR 156 (Depot Street) – Wilton, Weld	
Franklin	Farmington	62.32	100.29	SR 133 (Livermore Falls Road) – Livermore Falls	Northern terminus of SR 133
Franklin	Farmington	65.10	104.77	SR 43 west (Bridge Street) – Temple	Western end of concurrency with SR 43
Franklin	Farmington	65.25	105.01	SR 4 north / SR 27 north / SR 43 east (Main Street) – Saddleback, Sugarloaf, Rangeley	Eastern end of concurrency with SR 4 / SR 43; western end of concurrency with SR 27
Franklin	Farmington	69.66	112.11	SR 41 south (Crosswell Road) to SR 156 – Mount Vernon, Farmington Falls	Northern terminus of SR 41
Franklin	New Sharon	74.03	119.14	SR 134 north (Starks Road)	Western end of concurrency with SR 134
Franklin	New Sharon	74.24	119.48	SR 134 south (Cape Cod Hill Road) – Mount Vernon	Eastern end of concurrency with SR 134
Franklin	New Sharon	74.83	120.43	SR 27 south (Mile Hill Road) – Belgrade Lakes, Augusta	Eastern end of concurrency with SR 27
Somerset	Mercer	81.52	131.19	SR 137 east (Valley Road) – Smithfield	Western terminus of SR 137
Somerset	Norridgewock	86.58	139.34	US 201A north / SR 8 north (Bridge Street) – Madison	Western end of concurrency with US 201A / SR 8
Somerset	Norridgewock	86.96	139.95	SR 8 south (Mechanic Street) – Smithfield	Southern end of concurrency with SR 8
Somerset	Norridgewock	86.98	139.98	SR 139 east (Waterville Road) – Waterville	Western terminus of SR 139
Somerset	Skowhegan	92.00	148.06	US 201A ends US 201 south (Waterville Road) / SR 104 (Fairview Avenue) – Fairfield, Fairfield Center	Eastern end of concurrency with US 201A; western end of concurrency with US 201; northern terminus of SR 104
Somerset	Skowhegan	92.37	148.66	US 201 north	Eastern end of concurrency with US 201
Somerset	Skowhegan	92.46	148.80	SR 150 (North Avenue) – Guilford, Athens	Southern terminus of SR 150
Somerset	Canaan	100.65	161.98	SR 23 south (Hinckley Road) – Hinckley, Fairfield	Western end of concurrency with SR 23
Somerset	Canaan	101.14	162.77	SR 23 north (Hartland Road) – Hartland	Eastern end of concurrency with SR 23
Somerset	Palmyra	109.64	176.45	SR 152 (Estes Avenue) – Pittsfield, Hartland	
Somerset	Palmyra	112.32	180.76	SR 151 (Warren Hill Road) – Hartland, St. Albans	Southern terminus of SR 151
Penobscot	Newport	116.38	187.30	SR 7 north / SR 11 / SR 100 south (Moosehead Trail) to I-95 – Pittsfield, Moosehead Lake Region, Dexter	Rotary; western end of concurrency with SR 7 / SR 100; exit 157 on I-95
Penobscot	Newport	119.92	192.99	SR 7 south (Roussin Road) to I-95 – Dixmont, Plymouth	Eastern end of concurrency with SR 7; exit 161 on I-95
Penobscot	Etna	125.50	201.97	SR 143 (Dixmont Road / Lakins Road) to I-95 – Dixmont Center, Stetson	
Penobscot	Carmel	128.77	207.24	SR 69 to I-95 north – Winterport	
Penobscot	Bangor	141.32	227.43	I-395 / I-95 / SR 15 to SR 9 – Bangor, Brewer, Newport, Orono	Western terminus of I-395; exit 182 on I-95
Penobscot	Bangor	142.35– 142.51	229.09– 229.35	I-95 / SR 15 – Newport, Augusta, Orono, Houlton	Exit 183 on I-95
Penobscot	Bangor	143.68	231.23	SR 222	Eastern terminus of SR 222
Penobscot	Bangor	144.00	231.75	SR 100 ends / Main Street	Eastern end of concurrency with SR 100; former eastern terminus of US 202
Penobscot	Bangor	144.22	232.10	SR 15 Bus. (Broadway) to I-95 / SR 9 Bus. – Brewer, Dover-Foxcroft	
Penobscot	Orono	151.81	244.31	SR 16 west (Bennoch Road) – Lagrange, Milo	Eastern terminus of SR 16
Penobscot	Orono	152.14	244.85	US 2A east (College Avenue)	Western terminus of US 2A
Penobscot	Old Town	156.03	251.11	US 2A west / SR 43 west – Stillwater, Hudson, Penobscot Indian Reservation	Eastern terminus of US 2A / SR 43
Penobscot	Milford	156.44	251.77	SR 178 – Eddington, Bradley	Northern terminus of SR 178
Penobscot	Enfield	179.01	288.09	SR 6 west / SR 116 south / SR 155 (Hammett Road) to I-95 – Enfield, Howland	Western end of concurrency with SR 6 / SR 116
Penobscot	Lincoln	189.22	304.52	SR 116 north to I-95	Eastern end of concurrency with SR 116
Penobscot	Lincoln	190.81	307.08	SR 155 – Enfield	Northern terminus of SR 155
Penobscot	Lincoln	191.02	307.42	SR 6 east – Topsfield	Eastern end of concurrency with SR 6
Penobscot	Winn	201.88	324.89	SR 168 south – Lee	Northern terminus of SR 168
Penobscot	Mattawamkeag	204.58	329.24	Mattawamkeag River	
Penobscot	Mattawamkeag	204.77	329.55	SR 157 to I-95 – Baxter State Park, Medway, Millinocket	Eastern terminus of SR 157
Aroostook	Macwahoc Plantation	214.02	344.43	SR 170 – Kingman	Northern terminus of SR 170
Aroostook	Macwahoc Plantation	214.33	344.93	US 2A east – Haynesville, Houlton	Western terminus of US 2A
Aroostook	Sherman	231.67	372.84	SR 158 (Woodbridge Corner Road) to I-95 – Sherman, Sherman Mills, Patten	Eastern terminus of SR 158
Aroostook	Island Falls	242.75	390.67	SR 159 (Crystal Road) to I-95 – Patten	Eastern terminus of SR 159
Aroostook	Smyrna	253.32	407.68	SR 212 Smyrna-Oakfield Road to I-95	Eastern terminus of SR 212
Aroostook	Smyrna	258.63– 258.85	416.22– 416.58	I-95 – Bangor, Houlton	Exit 291 on I-95
Aroostook	Houlton	269.76	434.14	US 1 north to I-95 – Mars Hill	Western end of concurrency with US 1
Aroostook	Houlton	269.93	434.41	Meduxnekeag River	
Aroostook	Houlton	270.05	434.60	US 2A west (Military Street) – Bangor	Eastern terminus of US 2A
Aroostook	Houlton	270.12	434.72	US 1 south (Court Street) – Calais	Eastern end of concurrency with US 1
Aroostook	Houlton	273.21	439.69	I-95 – Woodstock NB, Bangor	Eastern terminus of US 2; exit 305 on I-95
1.000 mi = 1.609 km; 1.000 km = 0.621 mi: Concurrency terminus

U.S. Route 2
Previous state: New Hampshire	Maine	Next state: Terminus
