= Maine State Route 159 =

State highway in Maine, US

State Route 159

Route information
- Maintained by MaineDOT
- Length: 20.52 mi (33.02 km)
- Existed: 1925–present

Major junctions
- West end: Shin Pond Village in Mt. Chase
- SR 11 in Patten; I-95 in Island Falls
- East end: US 2 in Island Falls

Location
- Country: United States
- State: Maine
- Counties: Penobscot, Aroostook

Highway system
- Maine State Highway System; Interstate; US; State; Auto trails; Lettered highways
← SR 158	→ SR 160

State Route 159 (abbreviated SR 159) is part of Maine's system of numbered state highways, located in Penobscot and Aroostook counties. The highway runs for 20 1/2 miles (33.0 km) from the village of Shin Pond in Mt. Chase to an intersection with U.S. Route 2 (US 2) in Island Falls.

SR 159 is signed as an east–west highway, but has a roughly L-shaped alignment.

== Route description ==
SR 159 begins in the west at Shin Pond Village in the northwest corner of Mt. Chase, on Shin Pond Road about 10 miles (16 km) northwest of SR 11. Route logs do not indicate a specific intersection for the terminus, which is located between the intersections of Black Point Road and Grand Lake / Snowshoe Roads.

The highway proceeds almost due south and slightly east through Mt. Chase, then enters the town of Patten. SR 156 turns due east and intersects with SR 11 in the town center. The two routes overlap briefly before SR 159 continues east along a slightly meandering route towards Island Falls. Crossing into Island Falls, SR 159 interchanges with Interstate 95 at exit 276 before terminating at US 2 in the town center.

== History ==
SR 159 was originally designated in 1925 and ran between SR 11 in Patten and US 2 in Island Falls. In 1949, it was extended northwest to its current western terminus.

== Junction list ==
County	Location	mi	km	Destinations	Notes
Penobscot	Mount Chase	0.00	0.00	Shin Pond Village	Western terminus of SR 159
Penobscot	Patten	9.93	15.98	SR 11 north – Ashland, Fort Kent	Northern terminus of SR 11 / SR 159 concurrency
Penobscot	Patten	10.36	16.67	SR 11 south – Sherman, Millinocket	Southern terminus of SR 11 / SR 159 concurrency
Aroostook	Island Falls	19.65– 19.84	31.62– 31.93	I-95 – Bangor, Houlton	I-95 exit 276
Aroostook	Island Falls	20.52	33.02	US 2 (Sherman Street / Houlton Road) – Sherman, Oakfield	Eastern terminus of SR 159
1.000 mi = 1.609 km; 1.000 km = 0.621 mi: Concurrency terminus
