= Maine State Route 185 =

State highway in Hancock County, Maine, US

State Route 185

Route information
- Maintained by MaineDOT
- Length: 3.46 mi (5.57 km)

Major junctions
- South end: Waukeag Avenue in Sorrento
- North end: US 1 in Sullivan

Location
- Country: United States
- State: Maine
- Counties: Hancock

Highway system
- Maine State Highway System; Interstate; US; State; Auto trails; Lettered highways
← SR 184	→ SR 186

State Route 185 (SR 185) is a short state route in the U.S. state of Maine. The route starts at Ocean Avenue in Sorrento and ends at U.S. Route 1 (US 1) in Sullivan. The length of the route is 3.46 miles (5.57 km) and it is located entirely in Hancock County.

== Route description ==
SR 185 is the main route into the center of Sorrento. It begins east of the downtown area at the intersection of Ocean Avenue and Keasarge Avenue on the south side of the peninsula. The route heads northeast for one block until reaching a four-way intersection with Waukeag Avenue and Doanes Point Avenue. At this point, SR 185 turns due north along Sorrent Avenue and parallels Back Cove for about 0.4 miles (0.64 km). At West Shore Road, SR 185 heads east along East Side Road to cut across the Waukeag Neck peninsula to later parallel the shore of Flanders Bay. Through this area, the road passes a golf course and a church. Shortly after the northernmost intersection with West Shore Road, SR 185 ends at US 1 just past the Sorrento–Sullivan town line.

== Junction list ==
The entire route is in Hancock County.

Location	mi	km	Destinations	Notes
Sorrento	0.00	0.00	Ocean Avenue	
Sullivan	3.46	5.57	US 1	
1.000 mi = 1.609 km; 1.000 km = 0.621 mi
