= Maine State Route 41 =

State highway in central Maine, US

State Route 41

Route information
- Maintained by MaineDOT
- Length: 26.98 mi (43.42 km)
- Existed: c. 1946–present

Major junctions
- South end: US 202 / SR 11 / SR 100 / SR 133 in Winthrop
- SR 17 in Readfield
- North end: US 2 / SR 27 near Farmington

Location
- Country: United States
- State: Maine
- Counties: Kennebec, Franklin

Highway system
- Maine State Highway System; Interstate; US; State; Auto trails; Lettered highways
← SR 37	→ SR 43

State Route 41 (abbreviated SR 41) is part of Maine's system of numbered highways, located in the central part of the state. It runs for 27 miles (43 km) from an intersection with U.S. Route 202 (US 202), SR 11, SR 100 and SR 133 in Winthrop north to an intersection with US 2 and SR 27 in Farmington.

== Route description ==
SR 41 begins in Winthrop along with SR 133 at an interchange with US 202 and SR 11/SR 100. The two routes run concurrent for two miles (3.2 km) before they split apart not far north from Winthrop. SR 41 runs west of Maranacook Lake until it joins with SR 17 in Readfield. Two miles (3.2 km) later, SR 41 splits north also in Readfield. From the split SR 17 and SR 41 northward to Vienna, SR 41 comes close to eight lakes, but only crosses a small river connecting Echo Lake to Taylor Pond. SR 41 passes through Vienna and then enters Franklin County. SR 41 passes through the extreme southwestern corner of New Sharon near Crowell Pond and meets the southern terminus of SR 134 before entering Chesterville. Continuing north, SR 41 meets the eastern terminus of SR 156 just before crossing into Farmington, and ends shortly thereafter at the intersection with Farmington Falls Road (US 2/SR 27).

== Major intersections ==
County	Location	mi	km	Destinations	Notes
Kennebec	Winthrop	0.00– 0.41	0.00– 0.66	US 202 / SR 11 / SR 100 / SR 133 begins – Augusta, Manchester, Lewiston	Interchange; south end of SR 41 and SR 133
Kennebec	Winthrop	1.77– 1.91	2.85– 3.07	SR 133 north (Wayne Road) – Wayne, Livermore	North end of overlap with SR 133
Kennebec	Readfield	6.66	10.72	SR 17 south (Main Street) – Manchester	South end of overlap with SR 17
Kennebec	Readfield	8.76– 8.79	14.10– 14.15	SR 17 north (Main Street) – Fayette, Livermore	North end of overlap with SR 17
Franklin	New Sharon	23.62	38.01	SR 134 (Cape Cod Hill Road) – New Sharon	South end of SR 134
Franklin	Chesterville	26.43– 26.45	42.53– 42.57	SR 156 west (Lucy Knowles Road) – Chesterville	East end of SR 156
Franklin	Farmington	26.98	43.42	US 2 / SR 27 (Farmington Falls Road) – Farmington, New Sharon	North end of SR 41
1.000 mi = 1.609 km; 1.000 km = 0.621 mi: Concurrency terminus
