= Maine State Route 210 =

State highway in Aroostook County, Maine, US

State Route 210
- Route of SR 210 c. 2007 highlighted in red

Route information
- Maintained by MaineDOT
- Length: 6.1 mi (9.8 km)
- Existed: 1925–c. 2007

Major junctions
- South end: US 1 / SR 164 in Presque Isle
- North end: US 1 in Presque Isle

Location
- Country: United States
- State: Maine
- Counties: Aroostook

Highway system
- Maine State Highway System; Interstate; US; State; Auto trails; Lettered highways
← SR 209	→ SR 211

State Route 210 (SR 210) was a state highway entirely in Presque Isle, Maine. It ran in a 6.1-mile (9.8 km) loop from the intersection of U.S. Route 1 (US 1) and SR 164 along the north and west side of the Aroostook River before turning to the west and ending at US 1. The route was originally designated in 1925, and ran between Fryeburg and North Waterford. During the renumbering, it became part of SR 5. Between 1937 and 1938, the number was applied to the loop built as a service road for the Northern Maine Sanitarium. Even after the closure of the sanitarium in the 1970s, the road along which the state route ran remains open and in use.

== Route description ==
The route began at the intersection of Caribou Road (US 1) and Washburn Road (SR 164 at its southern terminus) about 430 feet (130 m) north of the Aroostook River and approximately two miles (3.2 km) north of downtown Presque Isle. The road (named Reach Road) went southeast paralleling the river passing some woods, houses, and farmland. At the site of a former factory, the road curved to the east-northeast and intersected Higgins Road. At this point, SR 210 began to also closely follow a Bangor and Aroostook Railroad line. It passed the site of the Northern Maine Sanitarium (now in use as apartments) before slowly curving to the north. Now heading north, opposite the river from SR 205, the west side of the road's surroundings are mostly farms. At Brewer Road, SR 210 turned onto it heading due west up a small hill and through an area surrounded completely by farms and associated houses and work buildings. The road intersected the other end of Higgins Road and passed the studio and transmitter location of WAGM-TV before ending at a T-intersection with US 1/Caribou Road.

== Major junctions ==
The entire route was in Presque Isle, Aroostook County.

mi	km	Destinations	Notes
0.0	0.0	US 1 (Caribou Road) / SR 164 (Washburn Road) – Washburn, Caribou, Mars Hill	Southern terminus of SR 164
6.1	9.8	US 1 (Caribou Road)	
1.000 mi = 1.609 km; 1.000 km = 0.621 mi
