= Maine State Route 157 =

State highway in northern Maine, US

State Route 157

Route information
- Maintained by MaineDOT
- Length: 22.3 mi (35.9 km)

Major junctions
- West end: SR 11 in Millinocket
- I-95 in Medway
- East end: US 2 in Mattawamkeag

Location
- Country: United States
- State: Maine
- Counties: Penobscot, Aroostook

Highway system
- Maine State Highway System; Interstate; US; State; Auto trails; Lettered highways
← SR 156	→ SR 158

State Route 157 (SR 157) is a 22-mile-long (35 km) state highway in the northern part of the U.S. state of Maine. It travels between the towns of Millinocket and Mattawamkeag generally following the northern banks of the West Branch Penobscot River and the Penobscot River. For just under a half of its length, it is concurrent with SR 11 from Millinocket to Medway. This portion is also concurrent with the Katahdin Woods & Waters Maine Scenic Byway.

== Route description ==
SR 157 begins at the intersection of Katahdin Avenue, School Street, and Central Street. At this point, SR 11 continues south along Katahdin Avenue towards the center of the town while the road to the north is part of the Katahdin Woods & Waters Maine Scenic Byway and heads towards Baxter State Park. SR 11 and SR 157 head southeast then east along Central Avenue through a mostly residential neighborhood. At Penobscot Avenue, the road crosses the northern limits of the town's business district; this is also where the one-way SR 11B has its northern terminus. After crossing the Millinocket Stream, the road widens to three lanes (two lanes eastbound, one westbound) and climbs a small hill. At the crest of the hill, the road widens to four lanes (two lanes in each direction) passing in front of numerous gas stations, strip malls, and other businesses. The road narrows to two lanes and continues east through wooded areas. After curving to the northeast then to the southeast. It has a level crossing with a railroad then crosses Dolby Pond on a causeway. It enters the town limits of East Millinocket and crosses another reach of the pond, but otherwise stays along the northeast shoreline of Dolby Pond.

Through East Millinocket, several small businesses and houses line the north side of Main Street, the road carrying SR 11 and SR 157. On the south side of the road is a Great Northern Paper Company factory. The road briefly divides between Maple and Spruce streets and then resumes a southeasterly journey into the town of Medway. The road more closely parallels the West Branch Penobscot River in this part of the town as it passes in front of many small businesses. As SR 11 and SR 157 start to bend to the east, it intersects SR 116 at its northern terminus. The road heads in front of a few more businesses, houses, and a park before it crosses the East Branch Penobscot River. Shortly after the crossing of the river, SR 11 and the Katahdin Woods & Waters Byway turn north along Grindstone Road while SR 157 alone heads southeast past a motel and other businesses surrounding Interstate 95's exit 244. The interchange is a diamond interchange with SR 157 passing over the Interstate. East of the interchange, the road passes some small houses as it parallels the Penobscot River. It briefly enters Aroostook County but re-enters Penobscot County in the town of Mattawamkeag. The highway ends at an intersection with U.S. Route 2 north of downtown Mattawamkeag and the Mattawamkeag River.

== Major junctions ==
County	Location	mi	km	Destinations	Notes
Penobscot	Millinocket	0.0	0.0	SR 11 south (Katahdin Avenue) / School Street – Baxter State Park	Western end of SR 11 concurrency
Penobscot	Millinocket	0.2	0.32	SR 11B south (Penobscot Avenue)	Northern terminus of SR 11B
Penobscot	Medway	9.8	15.8	SR 116 south (Pattagumpus Road) – Woodville, Chester	Northern terminus of SR 116
Penobscot	Medway	10.5	16.9	SR 11 north (Grindstone Road) / Main Road – Grindstone	Eastern end of SR 11 concurrency
Penobscot	Medway	11.2– 11.3	18.0– 18.2	I-95 – Bangor, Houlton	Exit 244 (I-95)
Aroostook	No major junctions				
Penobscot	Mattawamkeag	22.3	35.9	US 2 – Lincoln, Houlton	
1.000 mi = 1.609 km; 1.000 km = 0.621 mi: Concurrency terminus
