= Maine State Route 208 =

State highway in York County, Maine, US

State Route 208

Route information
- Maintained by MaineDOT
- Length: 7.09 mi (11.41 km)
- Existed: 1964 (current alignment)–present

Major junctions
- South end: Mile Stretch Road / Yates Street in Biddeford
- SR 9 in Biddeford
- North end: SR 9 / SR 111 in Biddeford

Location
- Country: United States
- State: Maine
- Counties: York

Highway system
- Maine State Highway System; Interstate; US; State; Auto trails; Lettered highways
← SR 207	→ SR 209

State Route 208 (SR 208) is a numbered state highway in York County, Maine, located entirely within the city of Biddeford. It serves as the main north–south connector between Biddeford Pool and downtown. SR 208 is 7.09 miles (11.41 km) long, although most of the route runs concurrently with SR 9.

== Route description ==
SR 208 begins at the intersection of Yates Street and Mile Stretch Road at Biddeford Pool. From there, it continues - signed as northbound but traveling in a southwesterly direction - along the outer peninsula that separates the Biddeford Pool from the Atlantic Ocean. At the intersection of Mile Stretch Road and Bridge Road, SR 208 turns northward meeting SR 9 (Pool Street) near the Biddeford water tower. SR 208 joins SR 9 and the two routes run concurrently into downtown Biddeford. This stretch of the road is still two lanes wide, but with a significantly wider shoulder. The road through the campus of University of New England. Speed limits range from 35–50 miles per hour (56–80 km/h) approaching downtown. The SR 208 designation ends at the intersection of Alfred Street and Jefferson Street, which is also the eastern terminus of SR 111. SR 111 runs westbound through Biddeford towards the Maine Turnpike while SR 9 turns northeast to enter Saco. Both provide nearby access to U.S. Route 1.

== Major junctions ==
The entire route is in Biddeford, York County.

mi	km	Destinations	Notes
0.00	0.00	Mile Stretch Road / Yates Street	
1.66	2.67	SR 9 west (Pool Street) – Kennebunkport	Southern end of SR 9 concurrency
7.09	11.41	SR 9 east / SR 111 west (Alfred Street) / Jefferson Street – Arundel, Kennebunk, Saco	Northern end of SR 9 concurrency; eastern terminus of SR 111
1.000 mi = 1.609 km; 1.000 km = 0.621 mi: Concurrency terminus
