= Maine State Route 107 =

State highway in Cumberland County, Maine, US

State Route 107

Route information
- Maintained by MaineDOT
- Length: 16.33 mi (26.28 km)
- Existed: 1936–present

Major junctions
- South end: SR 11 / SR 113 in Baldwin
- SR 11 in Baldwin
- North end: SR 117 in Bridgton

Location
- Country: United States
- State: Maine
- Counties: Cumberland

Highway system
- Maine State Highway System; Interstate; US; State; Auto trails; Lettered highways
← SR 106	→ SR 108

State Route 107 (SR 107) is a state highway in the U.S. state of Maine. It is a 16.33 mi (26.28 km) secondary route that connects the towns of Baldwin and Bridgton. The southern terminus is at State Route 11 and State Route 113 in Baldwin and the northern terminus is at State Route 117 in Bridgton. The highway runs through Cumberland County.

== Route description ==
SR 107 begins in East Baldwin at SR 11 and SR 113. It is overlapped with SR 11 for the southernmost 1.80 miles (2.90 km) of its length, following Bridgton Road due north between Woods Millpond and Sand Pond to an intersection with Sebago Road. SR 11 splits to the northeast onto Sebago Road while SR 107 continues north, continuing to follow Bridgton Road to Long Hill Road, where it enters Sebago. SR 107 turns northwest away from the nearby Sebago Lake, passing between Peabody Pond and Hancock Pond and traversing hilly terrain through the central part of town. The route then turns north again, entering the town of Bridgton. SR 107 runs through South Bridgton along South Bridgton Road before crossing Sandy Creek and ending at SR 117, less than 1 mile (1.6 km) west of U.S. Route 302.

== History ==
The SR 107 designation was originally applied in 1925 to a 75.6-mile (121.7 km) route running between SR 100 in downtown Auburn and Haines Landing in Rangeley. Most of this route was absorbed by SR 4 when it was designated in 1931, and all of it exists as the northernmost segment of SR 4 today.

Modern SR 107 was designated in 1936 on a new route between SR 11 north of Baldwin and SR 117 in Bridgton, with an original length of 14.53 miles (23.38 km). In 1953, SR 107 was extended south along SR 11 to terminate at SR 113 in Baldwin. The route has not changed since.

== Junction list ==
The entire route is in Cumberland County.

Location	mi	km	Destinations	Notes
Baldwin	0.00	0.00	SR 11 south / SR 113 – Steep Falls, Standish, Baldwin	Southern end of SR 11 overlap
Baldwin	1.80	2.90	SR 11 north – Sebago	Northern end of SR 11 overlap
Bridgton	16.33	26.28	SR 117 – Denmark, Bridgton	
1.000 mi = 1.609 km; 1.000 km = 0.621 mi: Concurrency terminus
