= Maine State Route 156 =

State highway in Franklin County, Maine, US

State Route 156

Route information
- Maintained by MaineDOT
- Length: 22.93 mi (36.90 km)

Major junctions
- West end: SR 142 in Weld
- US 2 / SR 4 near Wilton
- East end: SR 41 in Chesterville

Location
- Country: United States
- State: Maine
- Counties: Franklin

Highway system
- Maine State Highway System; Interstate; US; State; Auto trails; Lettered highways
← SR 155	→ SR 157

State Route 156 (SR 156) is a 23-mile-long (37 km) state highway in the U.S. state of Maine. It is located entirely in Franklin County and runs between Weld and the Chesterville village of Farmington Falls.

== Route description ==
SR 156 begins in the town of Weld at an intersection with SR 142. It heads southeast past a few houses and the Weld Town Hall in an otherwise rural area of Weld. It enters the unincorporated South Franklin heading through a mostly wooded area continuing south west. After entering Wilton the number of houses lining the road begins to slowly increase especially as it reaches the settlement of Wilton Intervale. Some small farms line the road as SR 156 heads towards downtown Wilton. Before entering the town center, the road passes Wilson Lake Country Club and a factory. At the intersection of Weld Road and Main Street, surrounded by a few small businesses and houses, SR 156 turns east along Main Street for one block before turning southeast onto Depot Street. The road generally follows Wilson Stream whilst passing homes and a small factory before heading towards another business district in the town. Nearing the town line at the settlement of Dryden, SR 156 intersects U.S. Route 2 (US 2) and SR 4.

A few more houses line SR 156 while it is in Wilton, but the surroundings become more rural upon entering the town of Jay. The road climbs a small hill passing a cemetery and some churches before intersecting SR 133 at the hamlet of Beans Corner. Past here, SR 156 bends to the northeast through a rural area, then briefly enters Chesterville, re-enters Wilton, and heads into the southernmost reaches of Farmington before turning southeast to re-enter Chesterville and the hamlet of North Chesterville. Except for one general store, the area consists of houses lining the road. At Wilton Road, SR 156 turns to the northwest to cross Wilson Stream and enter Farmington again. The route turns northeast onto Lucy Knowles Road and heads through a forested area. SR 156 turns to the east, crosses Wilson Stream one last time and re-enters Chesterville at the hamlet of Farmington Falls. In this area, the route officially ends at a wye intersection with SR 41. However, some signage for SR 156 shows it joining SR 41 for a short concurrency across the Sandy River and onto Philbrick Road to US 2 and SR 27 within the town limits of Farmington. While there is no signage for eastbound traffic to be directed along SR 156 past SR 41; a reassurance marker for west SR 156 exists heading west from US 2/SR 27.

== Major junctions ==
The entire route is in Franklin County.

Location	mi	km	Destinations	Notes
Weld	0.00	0.00	SR 142 (Mill Street / Church Street) / Center Hill Road – Phillips, Dixfield	
Wilton	14.29	23.00	US 2 / SR 4 – Rumford, Farmington	
Jay	16.15	25.99	SR 133 (Franklin Road) – Farmington, Livermore Falls	
Chesterville	22.93	36.90	SR 41 (Vienna Road) to US 2 / SR 27 – Vienna, Farmington	
1.000 mi = 1.609 km; 1.000 km = 0.621 mi
