= Maine State Route 133 =

State highway in Maine, US

State Route 133

Route information
- Maintained by MaineDOT
- Length: 28.76 mi (46.28 km)

Major junctions
- South end: US 202 / SR 11 / SR 41 / SR 100 in Winthrop
- SR 219 in Wayne; SR 106 in Livermore Falls; SR 17 in Livermore Falls; SR 156 in Jay
- North end: US 2 / SR 4 in Farmington

Location
- Country: United States
- State: Maine
- Counties: Kennebec, Androscoggin, Franklin

Highway system
- Maine State Highway System; Interstate; US; State; Auto trails; Lettered highways
← SR 132	→ SR 134

State Route 133 (SR 133) is part of Maine's system of numbered state highways, running from U.S. Route 202 (US 202), SR 11, and SR 100 in Winthrop to US 2 and SR 4 in Farmington. The first two miles of the route runs concurrently with SR 41. The total length of SR 133 is 28.76 miles (46.28 km).

== Route description ==
SR 133 (and SR 41) begins at the interchange with US 202/SR 11/SR 100 in Winthrop. Routes 133 and 41 run concurrently for about two miles (3.2 km) in Winthrop. After splitting from SR 41 in Winthrop, the road heads west towards Wayne, where it meets the eastern end of SR 219. After the SR 219 junction, it heads north to the northern end of SR 106 at Livermore Falls. After passing SR 106, SR 133 keeps going north to SR 17 in Livermore Falls. SR 17 marks the second time where SR 133 has a concurrency with another state highway. Upon leaving SR 17 in Livermore Falls, it heads north towards SR 156 in Jay. SR 133 ends at Farmington at the junction with US 2 and SR 4 after passing SR 156 in Jay.

== Major junctions ==
County	Location	mi	km	Destinations	Notes
Kennebec	Winthrop	0.00– 0.41	0.00– 0.66	US 202 / SR 11 / SR 100 / SR 41 begins – Augusta, Manchester, Lewiston	Interchange; southern end of SR 41 concurrency
Kennebec	Winthrop	1.85– 1.88	2.98– 3.03	SR 41 north (Readfield Road) – Readfield	Northern end of SR 41 concurrency
Kennebec	Wayne	7.76	12.49	SR 219 west (Leeds Road) – North Turner, West Paris	Eastern terminus of SR 219
Androscoggin	Livermore Falls	11.74	18.89	SR 106 south (Leeds Road) / Campground Road – North Leeds	Northern terminus of SR 106
Androscoggin	Livermore Falls	16.87	27.15	SR 17 east (Main Street) / Foundry Road – Fayette, Readfield	Southern end of SR 17 concurrency
Androscoggin	Livermore Falls	17.68	28.45	SR 17 west (Depot Street) – Wilton	Northern end of SR 17 concurrency
Franklin	Jay	25.35	40.80	SR 156 (Depot Street / Chesterville Road) – Wilton, Chesterville	
Franklin	Farmington	28.76	46.28	US 2 (Wilton Road) / SR 4 / Hospital Drive – Wilton, Farmington	
1.000 mi = 1.609 km; 1.000 km = 0.621 mi: Concurrency terminus
