= Maine State Route 110 =

State highway in York County, Maine, US

State Route 110

Route information
- Maintained by MaineDOT
- Length: 3.60 mi (5.79 km)
- Existed: 1931–present

Major junctions
- West end: Route 110 in Wakefield, NH
- East end: SR 11 in Newfield

Location
- Country: United States
- State: Maine
- Counties: York

Highway system
- Maine State Highway System; Interstate; US; State; Auto trails; Lettered highways
| ← SR 109 | → SR 111 |

State Route 110 (SR 110) is a state highway in the U.S. state of Maine. It is a 3.60-mile (5.79 km) secondary route that connects the villages of East Wakefield, New Hampshire and West Newfield, Maine. The western terminus is at the New Hampshire state line in Newfield, where it indirectly connects to New Hampshire Route 153 . The eastern terminus is at State Route 11 in Newfield. The highway is located entirely within the town of Newfield in York County.

== Route description ==
SR 110 begins at the New Hampshire state line between Newfield, Maine and Wakefield, New Hampshire approximately 0.5 miles (0.8 km) east of NH 153, and runs due east through West Newfield until intersecting and ending at SR 11. SR 110 is called Wakefield Road over its entire length.

=== Western terminus ===
In East Wakefield, the road running between NH 153 and the state line is known locally as "Route 110" and maintained by the New Hampshire Department of Transportation, but is not a numbered highway, nor is it related to NH 110. Junction signage for SR 110 is present on NH 153 using Maine-style route shields. An eastbound reassurance shield for SR 110 is present on the New Hampshire side; however, westbound signage clearly indicates the route's end at the state line. Many maps erroneously depict SR 110 extending all the way to NH 153.

== History ==
When it was designated in 1925, SR 110 was much longer than it is today, stretching from Alfred to Limington. It went under major changes in 1931, with its western terminus being shifted to the New Hampshire state line and all of its eastern routing becoming part of modern SR 4, SR 5, SR 11, and U.S. Route 202, resulting in the short alignment it has today.

== Junction list ==
The entire route is in Newfield, York County.

| mi | km | Destinations | Notes |
|---|---|---|---|
| 0.00 | 0.00 | To NH 153 (Route 110) – Sanbornville, Effingham | Continuation into New Hampshire |
| 3.60 | 5.79 | SR 11 (Water Street/Bond Spring Road) – Limerick, Shapleigh, Sanford | |
1.000 mi = 1.609 km; 1.000 km = 0.621 mi
