= Maine State Route 111 =

State highway in York County, Maine, US

State Route 111
- Carl Broggi Highway

Route information
- Maintained by MaineDOT
- Length: 13.97 mi (22.48 km)
- Existed: 1925, c. 1946 (current alignment)–present

Major junctions
- West end: US 202 / SR 4 / SR 4A in Alfred
- SR 35 in Lyman; I-95 / Maine Turnpike in Biddeford; US 1 in Biddeford
- East end: SR 9 / SR 208 in Biddeford

Location
- Country: United States
- State: Maine
- Counties: York

Highway system
- Maine State Highway System; Interstate; US; State; Auto trails; Lettered highways
← SR 110	→ SR 112
← Route 10	N.E.	→ Route 12

State Route 111 (SR 111), also known as the Carl Broggi Highway, is a 14-mile-long (23 km) state highway in southern Maine. It runs east–west, connecting the towns of Alfred and Biddeford. It is a major east–west corridor in central York County, Maine.

== Route description ==
SR 111 begins at its junction with U.S. Route 202 (US 202), SR 4, and SR 4A in Alfred, Maine. It travels east along Biddeford Road/Carl Broggi Highway. Outside the Alfred city limits, Biddeford Road becomes "Alfred Road". SR 111 intersects SR 35 at Goodwin Mills Road, then continues into Biddeford crossing Interstate 95 (Maine Turnpike) at exit 32.

SR 111 continues as Alfred Street, the turnpike link into downtown Biddeford. Just prior to entering downtown Biddeford, it intersects US 1, then reaches its eastern terminus at the junction with SR 9/SR 208.

For the majority of its length, SR 111 is a two lane road. However it has recently been widened to four lanes for a short distance between The Shops at Biddeford Crossing and US 1 due to heavier traffic from nearby shopping centers.

== History ==

SR 111's entire distance was once designated as part of the now-defunct New England Interstate Route 11, which traversed from Biddeford to Manchester, Vermont (near the Vermont - New York border). The road was most likely renamed as Route 111 to commemorate its association with the historic New England Route 11.

== Junction list ==
The entire route is in York County.

Location	mi	km	Destinations	Notes
Alfred	0.00	0.00	US 202 west / SR 4A south (Sanford Road) – Sanford US 202 east / SR 4 north (Oak Street) – Waterboro SR 4 south (Jordan Springs Road) – North Berwick	Western terminus; northern terminus of SR 4A
Lyman	5.95	9.58	SR 35 (Goodwin's Mills Road / Alewive Road) – Hollis Center, Kennebunk	
Biddeford	11.47	18.46	I-95 / Maine Turnpike / Biddeford Connector – Arundel, Kittery, Boston, Portland, Augusta, Montreal	Exit 32 on I-95 / Turnpike
Biddeford	12.78– 12.85	20.57– 20.68	US 1 (Elm Street) – Saco, Kennebunk	
Biddeford	13.97	22.48	SR 9 / SR 208 south (Alfred Street / Pool Street) – Saco, Biddeford Pool, Kennebunkport	Eastern terminus; northern terminus of SR 208
1.000 mi = 1.609 km; 1.000 km = 0.621 mi
