= Maine State Route 207 =

State highway in Cumberland County, Maine, US

State Route 207
- Black Point Road

Route information
- Maintained by MaineDOT
- Length: 2.93 mi (4.72 km)

Major junctions
- South end: SR 77 in Scarborough
- North end: US 1 / SR 9 / SR 114 in Scarborough

Location
- Country: United States
- State: Maine
- Counties: Cumberland

Highway system
- Maine State Highway System; Interstate; US; State; Auto trails; Lettered highways
← SR 206	→ SR 208

State Route 207 (SR 207) is a short state highway through the town of Scarborough, Maine. It connects Center Scarborough to the coastline at Prouts Neck. For its entire 2.93-mile (4.72 km) length, it is called Black Point Road.

== Major junctions ==
The entire route is in Scarborough, Cumberland County.

mi	km	Destinations	Notes
0.00	0.00	SR 77 north (Spurwink Road) / Black Point Road	Southern terminus of SR 77
2.93	4.72	US 1 / SR 9 / SR 114 north (Gorham Road) – Saco, Portland, Gorham	Southern terminus of SR 114
1.000 mi = 1.609 km; 1.000 km = 0.621 mi
