= Maine State Route 106 =

State highway in Androscoggin County, Maine, US

State Route 106

Route information
- Maintained by MaineDOT
- Length: 14.11 mi (22.71 km)
- Existed: 1938–present

Major junctions
- South end: US 202 / SR 11 / SR 100 in Leeds
- North end: SR 133 in Livermore Falls

Location
- Country: United States
- State: Maine
- Counties: Androscoggin

Highway system
- Maine State Highway System; Interstate; US; State; Auto trails; Lettered highways
← SR 105	→ SR 107

State Route 106 (SR 106) is part of Maine's system of state highways, located in northeastern Androscoggin County. It is a secondary highway running from an intersection with U.S. Route 202 (US 202), SR 11, and SR 100 south of Leeds northwest to Livermore Falls, where it intersects SR 133. SR 106 is signed as a north–south highway.

== Route description ==
SR 106 begins at US 202/SR 11/SR 100 in Leeds, in the southern corner of town. The highway runs northward into town, along the west side of Androscoggin Lake, until it meets SR 219. The two routes share a brief concurrency before SR 106 turns back north along the Androscoggin River. The highway crosses into the town limits of Livermore Falls and ends at an intersection with SR 133, south of town.

== Junction list ==
The entire route is in Androscoggin County.

Location	mi	km	Destinations	Notes
Leeds	0.00	0.00	US 202 / SR 11 / SR 100 – Lewiston, Augusta	
Leeds	9.16	14.74	SR 219 east – Wayne	Eastern terminus of SR 219 concurrency
Leeds	9.84	15.84	SR 219 west (Howes Corner Road) – Hartford, West Paris	Western terminus of SR 219 concurrency
Livermore Falls	14.11	22.71	SR 133 (Park Street) – Livermore Falls, Wayne	
1.000 mi = 1.609 km; 1.000 km = 0.621 mi: Concurrency terminus
