= Maine State Route 216 =

State highway in Sagadahoc County, Maine, US

State Route 216
- Small Point Road

Route information
- Maintained by MaineDOT
- Length: 2.28 mi (3.67 km)

Major junctions
- South end: Small Point Road / Head Beach Road in Phippsburg
- North end: SR 209 in Phippsburg

Location
- Country: United States
- State: Maine
- Counties: Sagadahoc

Highway system
- Maine State Highway System; Interstate; US; State; Auto trails; Lettered highways
← SR 215	→ SR 218

State Route 216 (SR 216) is a short state route in the U.S. state of Maine. It runs from Head Beach Road to SR 209 in the town of Phippsburg.

== Junction list ==
The entire route is in Phippsburg, Sagadahoc County.

mi	km	Destinations	Notes
0.00	0.00	Head Beach Road / Small Point Road	
2.28	3.67	SR 209 (Main Road / Popham Road)	
1.000 mi = 1.609 km; 1.000 km = 0.621 mi
