= Maine State Route 209 =

State highway in Sagadahoc County, Maine, US

State Route 209

Route information
- Maintained by MaineDOT
- Length: 15.92 mi (25.62 km)

Major junctions
- South end: Dead end in Phippsburg
- SR 216 in Phippsburg
- North end: US 1 in Bath

Location
- Country: United States
- State: Maine
- Counties: Sagadahoc

Highway system
- Maine State Highway System; Interstate; US; State; Auto trails; Lettered highways
| ← SR 208 | → SR 212 |

State Route 209 (SR 209) is a state route in the U.S. state of Maine. It runs from the intersection of Popham Road and Sea Street in the Phippsburg community of Popham Beach to an interchange with U.S. Route 1 (US 1) in Bath. The entire route is in Sagadahoc County. At its southern end, state maintenance of Popham Road continues past Sea Street to the entrance to Fort Popham.

== Junction list ==
The entire route is in Sagadahoc County.

| Location | mi | km | Destinations | Notes |
|---|---|---|---|---|
| Phippsburg | 0.00 | 0.00 | Popham Road / Sea Street – Fort Popham | |
| Phippsburg | 4.65 | 7.48 | SR 216 south (Small Point Road) | Northern terminus of SR 216 |
| Bath | 15.89– 15.92 | 25.57– 25.62 | US 1 south / High Street | Interchange; US 1 northbound exit / US 1 southbound entrance only |
1.000 mi = 1.609 km; 1.000 km = 0.621 mi: Incomplete access
