= Sorrento, Maine =

- Town
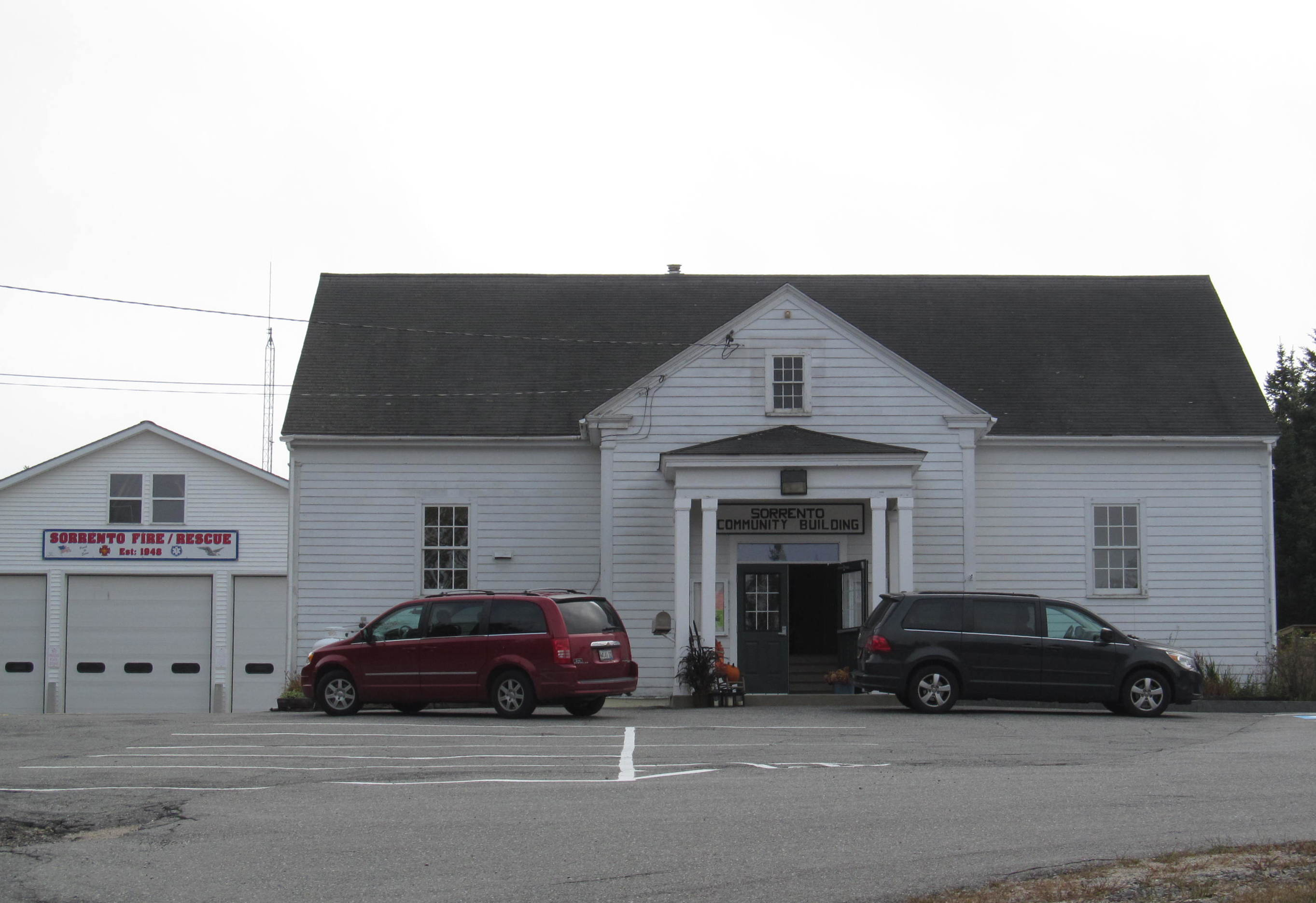

- Location within Maine Location within the United States
- Coordinates: 44°28′57″N 68°11′10″W
- Country: United States
- State: Maine
- County: Hancock
- Established: 1895

Government
  - Type: Board of Selectmen

Area
  - Total: 14.11 sq mi (36.54 km^{2})
  - Land: 3.99 sq mi (10.33 km^{2})
  - Water: 10.12 sq mi (26.21 km^{2})
- Elevation: 39 ft (12 m)

Population (2020)
  - Total: 279
  - Density: 70/sq mi (27/km^{2})
- Time zone: UTC-5 (Eastern (EST))
  - Summer (DST): UTC-4 (EDT)
- ZIP code: 04677
- Area code: 207
- FIPS code: 23-69750
- GNIS feature ID: 582730
- Website: www.sorrentome.org

Sorrento is a town in Hancock County, Maine, United States. The population was 279 at the 2020 census.

== Geography ==
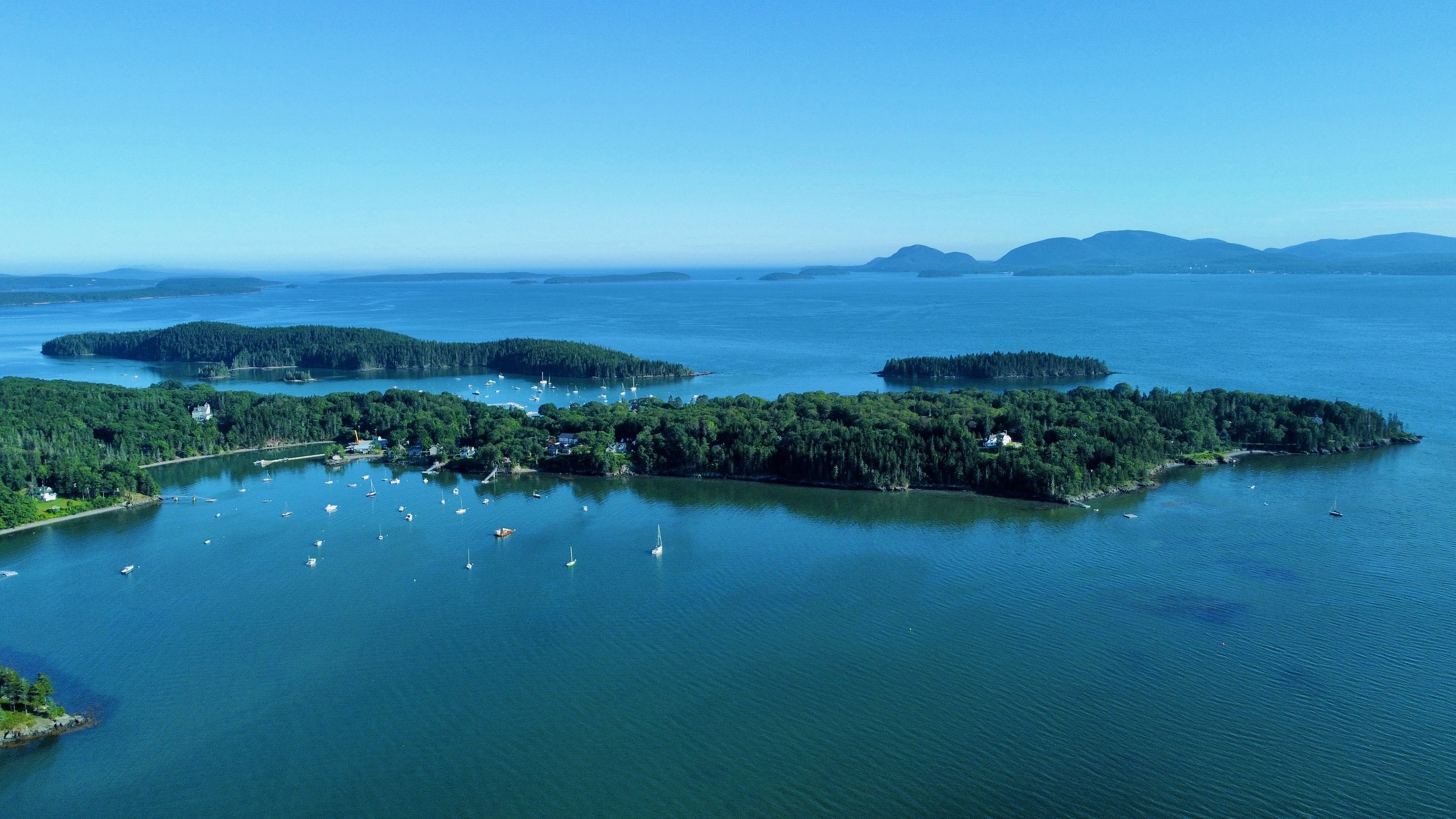
Drone view of Sorrento

According to the U.S. Census Bureau, the town has a total area of 14.11 square miles (36.54 km^{2}), of which 3.99 square miles (10.33 km^{2}) is land and 10.12 square miles (26.21 km^{2}) is water.

== Demographics ==
Historical population
Census	Pop.	Note	%±
1900	117		—
1910	147		25.6%
1920	140		−4.8%
1930	143		2.1%
1940	188		31.5%
1950	201		6.9%
1960	196		−2.5%
1970	199		1.5%
1980	276		38.7%
1990	295		6.9%
2000	290		−1.7%
2010	274		−5.5%
2020	279		1.8%
U.S. Decennial Census

=== 2010 census ===
As of the census of 2010, there were 274 people, 141 households, and 77 families living in the town. The population density was 68.7 inhabitants per square mile (26.5/km^{2}). There were 314 housing units at an average density of 78.7 per square mile (30.4/km^{2}). The racial makeup of the town was 95.6% White, 1.1% Native American, 0.7% Asian, and 2.6% from two or more races. Hispanic or Latino of any race were 0.4% of the population.

There were 141 households, of which 14.2% had children under the age of 18 living with them, 43.3% were married couples living together, 6.4% had a female householder with no husband present, 5.0% had a male householder with no wife present, and 45.4% were non-families. 38.3% of all households were made up of individuals, and 15.6% had someone living alone who was 65 years of age or older. The average household size was 1.94 and the average family size was 2.47.

The median age in the town was 52.5 years. 12% of residents were under the age of 18; 6.4% were between the ages of 18 and 24; 20.1% were from 25 to 44; 38.8% were from 45 to 64; and 22.6% were 65 years of age or older. The gender makeup of the town was 49.3% male and 50.7% female.

=== 2000 census ===
As of the census of 2000, there were 290 people, 128 households, and 93 families living in the town. The population density was 72.6 inhabitants per square mile (28.0/km^{2}). There were 282 housing units at an average density of 70.6 per square mile (27.3/km^{2}). The racial makeup of the town was 96.21% White, 2.07% Native American, 0.34% Pacific Islander, 1.03% from other races, and 0.34% from two or more races. Hispanic or Latino of any race were 0.69% of the population.

There were 128 households, out of which 21.9% had children under the age of 18, 60.2% were married couples living together, 9.4% had a single female, and 27.3% were non-families. 20.3% of all households were made up of individuals, and 9.4% had someone living alone who was 65 years of age or older. The average household size was 2.27 and the average family size was 2.59.

In the town, the population was spread out, with 16.6% under the age of 18, 6.9% from 18 - 24, 21.0% from 25 - 44, 32.8% from 45 - 64, and 22.8% who were 65 years of age or older. The median age was 47 years. For every 100 females, there were 95.9 males. For every 100 females age 18 and over, there were 96.7 males.

The median income for a household in the town was $42,125, and the median income for a family was $47,083. Males had a median income of $24,167 versus $27,500 for females. The per capita income for the town was $23,791. About 3.4% of families and 5.7% of the population were below the poverty line, including 17.4% of those under the age of eighteen and 3.0% of those 65 or over.

== Education ==
The school district is Regional School Unit 24. An elementary school in Sullivan, Mountain View School, covers Sorrento. The district's secondary schools, Sumner Middle School and Sumner Memorial High School, are a part of the Sumner Learning Campus in Sullivan.

== Notable people ==
- Howard Bruenn, Physician to the President who attended to Franklin D. Roosevelt before his death
- Newbold Noyes Jr., journalist
