= Starks, Maine =

Town in Maine, United States

- Town
- Location within Maine Location within the United States
- Coordinates: 44°44′18″N 69°57′08″W
- Country: United States
- State: Maine
- County: Somerset

Area
  - Total: 32.13 sq mi (83.22 km^{2})
  - Land: 31.59 sq mi (81.82 km^{2})
  - Water: 0.54 sq mi (1.40 km^{2})
- Elevation: 341 ft (104 m)

Population (2020)
  - Total: 593
  - Density: 19/sq mi (7.2/km^{2})
- Time zone: UTC-5 (Eastern (EST))
  - Summer (DST): UTC-4 (EDT)
- ZIP code: 04911
- Area code: 207
- FIPS code: 23-73845
- GNIS feature ID: 582745
- Website: www.starksme.com

Starks is a town in Somerset County, Maine, United States. The town was named after General John Stark of the Revolutionary War. The population was 593 at the 2020 census.

== Geography ==
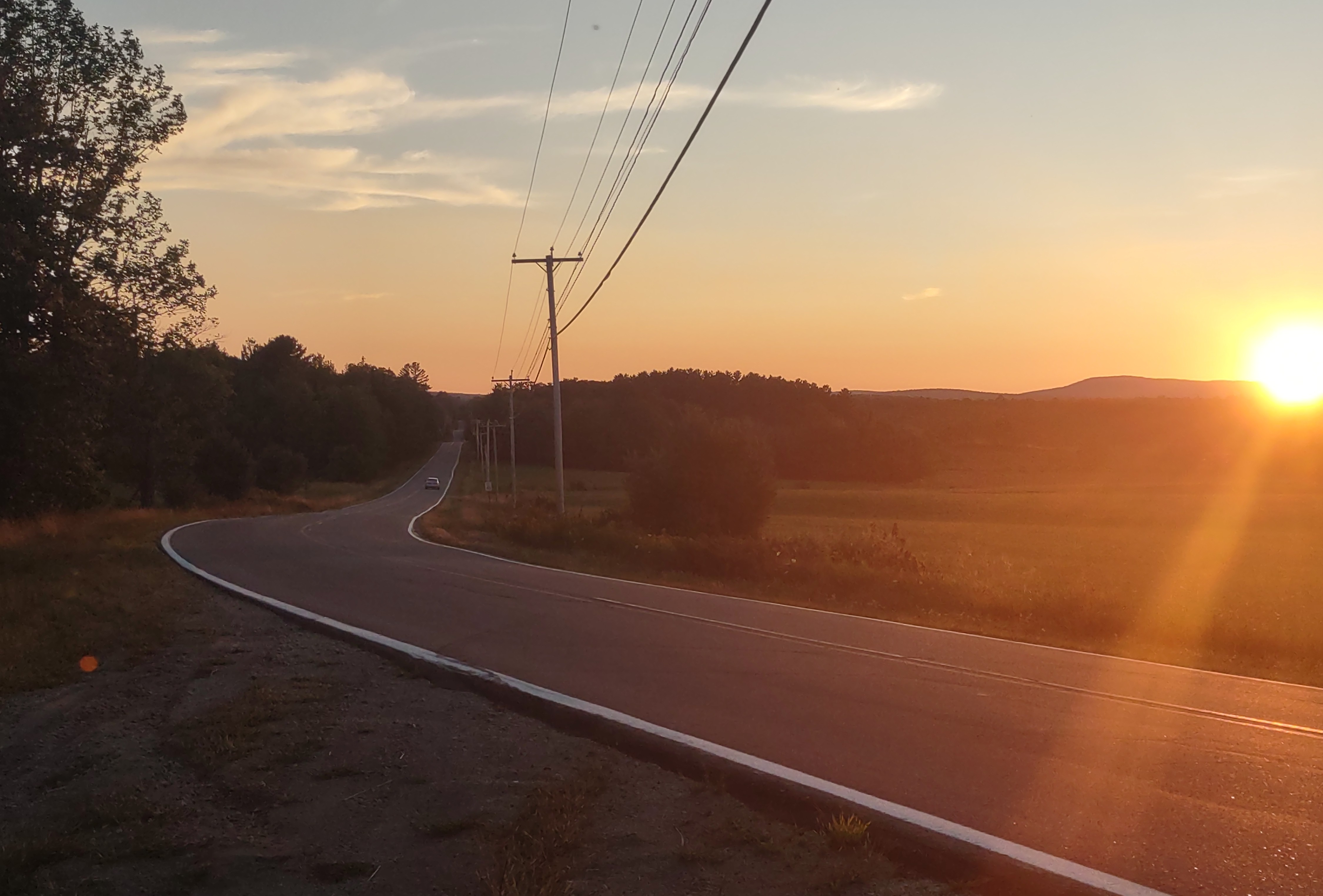
Landscape photo of Starks Maine

According to the United States Census Bureau, the town has a total area of 32.13 square miles (83.22 km^{2}), of which 31.59 square miles (81.82 km^{2}) is land and 0.54 square miles (1.40 km^{2}) is water.

== Demographics ==
Historical population
Census	Pop.	Note	%±
1800	502		—
1810	828		64.9%
1820	1,053		27.2%
1830	1,471		39.7%
1840	1,559		6.0%
1850	1,446		−7.2%
1860	1,340		−7.3%
1870	1,083		−19.2%
1880	929		−14.2%
1890	766		−17.5%
1900	636		−17.0%
1910	549		−13.7%
1920	528		−3.8%
1930	474		−10.2%
1940	426		−10.1%
1950	421		−1.2%
1960	306		−27.3%
1970	323		5.6%
1980	440		36.2%
1990	508		15.5%
2000	578		13.8%
2010	640		10.7%
2020	593		−7.3%
U.S. Decennial Census

=== 2010 census ===
As of the census of 2010, there were 640 people, 273 households, and 167 families living in the town. The population density was 20.3 inhabitants per square mile (7.8/km^{2}). There were 395 housing units at an average density of 12.5 per square mile (4.8/km^{2}). The racial makeup of the town was 98.6% White, 0.3% Native American, 0.2% Asian, 0.2% from other races, and 0.8% from two or more races. Hispanic or Latino of any race were 0.6% of the population.

There were 273 households, of which 28.2% had children under the age of 18 living with them, 50.9% were married couples living together, 5.5% had a female householder with no husband present, 4.8% had a male householder with no wife present, and 38.8% were non-families. 29.7% of all households were made up of individuals, and 8% had someone living alone who was 65 years of age or older. The average household size was 2.34 and the average family size was 2.92.

The median age in the town was 42.1 years. 21.4% of residents were under the age of 18; 7.2% were between the ages of 18 and 24; 26.5% were from 25 to 44; 30.7% were from 45 to 64; and 14.5% were 65 years of age or older. The gender makeup of the town was 51.7% male and 48.3% female.

=== 2000 census ===
As of the census of 2000, there were 578 people, 224 households, and 159 families living in the town. The population density was 18.4 people per square mile (7.1/km^{2}). There were 321 housing units at an average density of 10.2 per square mile (4.0/km^{2}). The racial makeup of the town was 98.27% White, 0.17% African American, 0.35% Native American, 0.17% Asian, and 1.04% from two or more races.

There were 224 households, out of which 33.9% had children under the age of 18 living with them, 59.8% were married couples living together, 6.7% had a female householder with no husband present, and 28.6% were non-families. 22.3% of all households were made up of individuals, and 5.8% had someone living alone who was 65 years of age or older. The average household size was 2.58 and the average family size was 3.01.

In the town, the population was spread out, with 27.3% under the age of 18, 6.6% from 18 to 24, 26.1% from 25 to 44, 31.7% from 45 to 64, and 8.3% who were 65 years of age or older. The median age was 38 years. For every 100 females, there were 104.2 males. For every 100 females age 18 and over, there were 110.0 males.

The median income for a household in the town was $30,313, and the median income for a family was $33,462. Males had a median income of $30,208 versus $20,357 for females. The per capita income for the town was $13,764. About 12.1% of families and 16.7% of the population were below the poverty line, including 19.1% of those under age 18 and 17.4% of those age 65 or over.

== Marijuana legalization ==
In 1992, the town of Starks made the first legal vote for marijuana legalization since the 1970s. Two ordinances written by Dave Wilkinson from neighboring Chesterville were voted on by thirteen Maine towns in the spring of 1992, an event which dominated the local news for a few weeks. One ordinance required that helicopters should not fly lower than 2000 feet over the town except in emergency. The other permitted the cultivation and possession of two pounds' dry weight of cannabis. Don Christen and Maine Vocals lobbied hard for votes. When Starks became the only town to pass both ordinances, it became national news. Wilkinson and other activists went to New York to appear on the "Faith Daniels Show," the high point of the media attention. The following year, the ordinances were repealed.

Starks continues to serve as a focal point among proponents of marijuana legalization in New England. A local farmer, Harry Brown, has hosted weekend festivals, concerts, and rallies to support the repeal of cannabis prohibition on his hillside since 1991.

== Notable person ==
- Edwin F. Ladd, U.S. senator from North Dakota
