= Macwahoc Plantation, Maine =

- Plantation
- Location of Macwahoc Plantation, Maine
- Coordinates: 45°37′06″N 68°15′46″W
- Country: United States
- State: Maine
- County: Aroostook

Area
  - Total: 29.6 sq mi (76.7 km^{2})
  - Land: 29.4 sq mi (76.2 km^{2})
  - Water: 0.15 sq mi (0.4 km^{2})
- Elevation: 404 ft (123 m)

Population (2020)
  - Total: 62
  - Density: 2.1/sq mi (0.81/km^{2})
- Time zone: UTC-5 (Eastern (EST))
  - Summer (DST): UTC-4 (EDT)
- ZIP code: 04451
- Area code: 207
- FIPS code: 23-42450
- GNIS feature ID: 582575

Macwahoc Plantation is a plantation in Aroostook County, Maine, United States. The population was 62 at the 2020 census.

== Geography ==
According to the United States Census Bureau, the plantation has a total area of 29.6 square miles (76.7 km^{2}), of which 29.4 square miles (76.2 km^{2}) is land and 0.15 square miles (0.4 km^{2}), or 0.55%, is water.

== Demographics ==
Historical population
Census	Pop.	Note	%±
1860	202		—
1870	170		−15.8%
1880	187		10.0%
1890	216		15.5%
1900	153		−29.2%
1910	147		−3.9%
1920	131		−10.9%
1930	163		24.4%
1940	242		48.5%
1950	131		−45.9%
1960	165		26.0%
1970	126		−23.6%
1980	126		0.0%
1990	114		−9.5%
2000	98		−14.0%
2010	79		−19.4%
2020	62		−21.5%
U.S. Decennial Census

At the 2000 census there were 98 people, 42 households, and 34 families living in the plantation. The population density was 3.3 inhabitants per square mile (1.3/km^{2}). There were 79 housing units at an average density of 2.7 per square mile (1.0/km^{2}). The racial makeup of the plantation was 100.00% White. Of the 42 households 28.6% had children under the age of 18 living with them, 66.7% were married couples living together, 7.1% had a female householder with no husband present, and 19.0% were non-families. 19.0% of households were one person and 7.1% were one person aged 65 or older. The average household size was 2.33 and the average family size was 2.59.

The age distribution was 17.3% under the age of 18, 8.2% from 18 to 24, 30.6% from 25 to 44, 32.7% from 45 to 64, and 11.2% 65 or older. The median age was 43 years. For every 100 females, there were 127.9 males. For every 100 females age 18 and over, there were 113.2 males.

The median household income was $23,750 and the median family income was $25,313. Males had a median income of $24,750 versus $13,750 for females. The per capita income for the plantation was $10,787. There were 12.8% of families and 16.5% of the population living below the poverty line, including 12.5% of under eighteens and 60.0% of those over 64.
