= New Sharon, Maine =

Town in Maine, United States

- Town
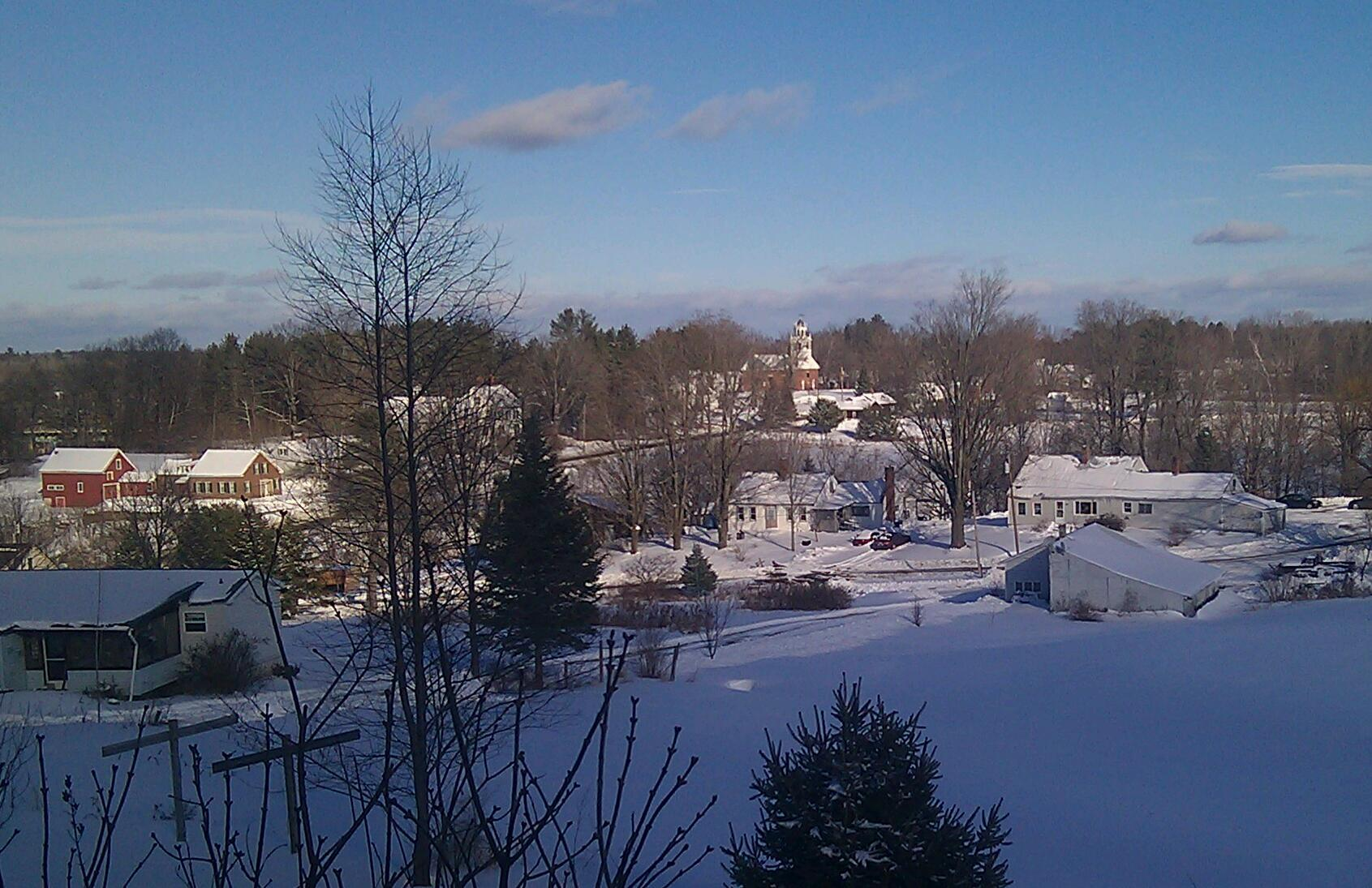
- Cape Cod Hill Road in New Sharon after snow.

- Seal

- Location within the state of Maine
- Coordinates: 44°37′18″N 70°00′25″W
- Country: United States
- State: Maine
- County: Franklin

Area
  - Total: 46.83 sq mi (121.29 km^{2})
  - Land: 46.19 sq mi (119.63 km^{2})
  - Water: 0.64 sq mi (1.66 km^{2})
- Elevation: 394 ft (120 m)

Population (2020)
  - Total: 1,458
  - Density: 32/sq mi (12.2/km^{2})
- Time zone: UTC-5 (Eastern (EST))
  - Summer (DST): UTC-4 (EDT)
- ZIP code: 04955
- Area code: 207
- FIPS code: 23-49345
- GNIS feature ID: 582624
- Website: www.newsharon.maine.gov

New Sharon is a town in Franklin County, Maine, United States, incorporated in 1794. The population was 1,458 at the 2020 census. The town is roughly bisected by the Sandy River, a tributary of the Kennebec River.

== Geography ==
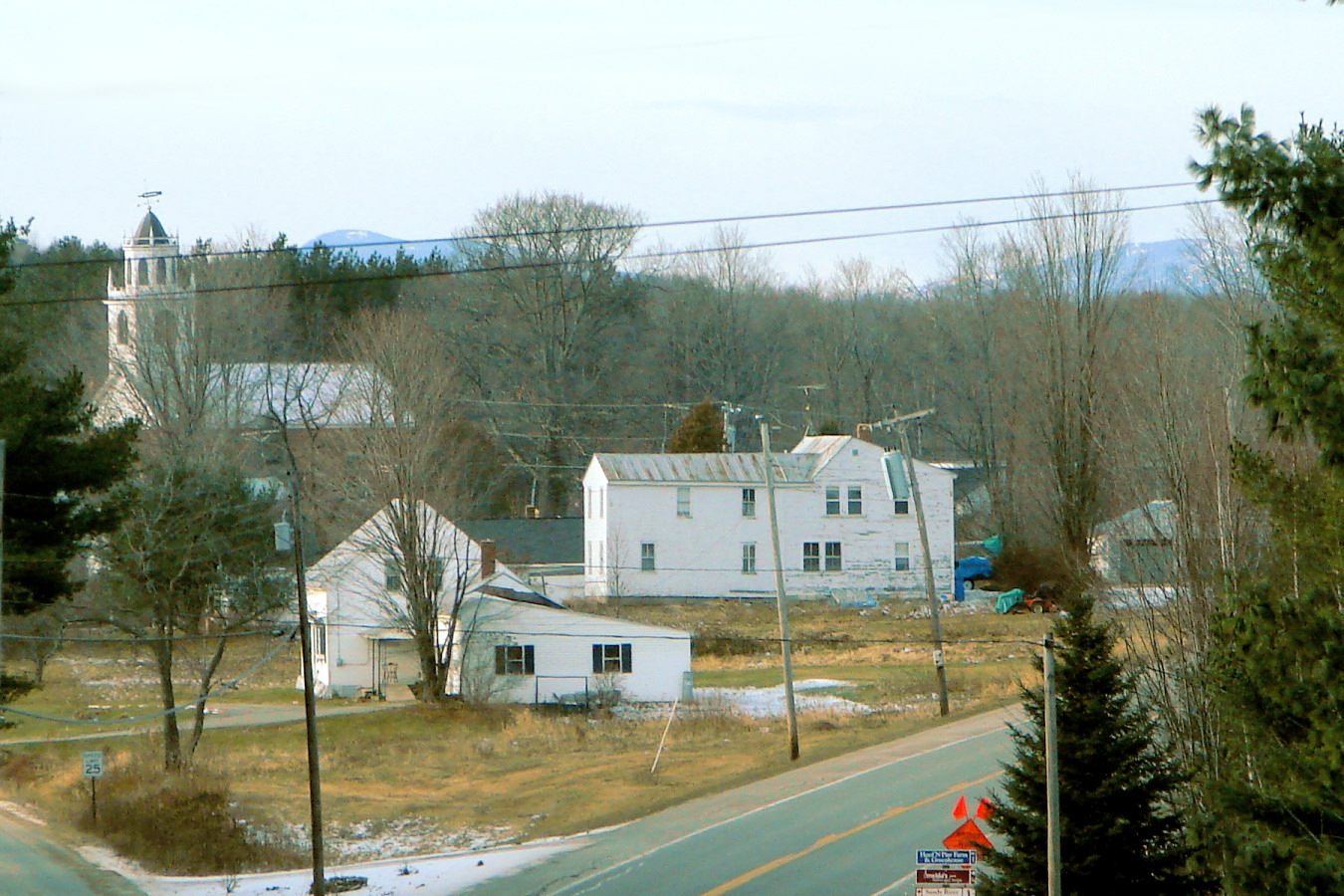
New Sharon

According to the United States Census Bureau, the town has a total area of 46.83 square miles (121.29 km^{2}), of which 46.19 square miles (119.63 km^{2}) is land and 0.64 square miles (1.66 km^{2}) is water.

=== Climate ===
This climatic region is typified by large seasonal temperature differences, with warm to hot (and often humid) summers and cold (sometimes severely cold) winters. According to the Köppen Climate Classification system, New Sharon has a humid continental climate, abbreviated "Dfb" on climate maps.

Climate data for New Sharon, Maine (1991–2020 normals, extremes 1995–present)
| Month | Jan | Feb | Mar | Apr | May | Jun | Jul | Aug | Sep | Oct | Nov | Dec | Year |
|---|---|---|---|---|---|---|---|---|---|---|---|---|---|
| Record high °F (°C) | 59 (15) | 61 (16) | 83 (28) | 89 (32) | 92 (33) | 97 (36) | 98 (37) | 97 (36) | 94 (34) | 84 (29) | 75 (24) | 64 (18) | 98 (37) |
| Mean maximum °F (°C) | 49.6 (9.8) | 50.2 (10.1) | 57.7 (14.3) | 74.1 (23.4) | 86.1 (30.1) | 88.1 (31.2) | 90.0 (32.2) | 88.4 (31.3) | 85.6 (29.8) | 75.3 (24.1) | 63.7 (17.6) | 53.0 (11.7) | 91.9 (33.3) |
| Mean daily maximum °F (°C) | 27.4 (−2.6) | 30.0 (−1.1) | 38.8 (3.8) | 51.8 (11.0) | 65.0 (18.3) | 73.2 (22.9) | 78.9 (26.1) | 78.0 (25.6) | 72.1 (22.3) | 57.0 (13.9) | 44.3 (6.8) | 33.3 (0.7) | 54.2 (12.3) |
| Daily mean °F (°C) | 17.3 (−8.2) | 19.5 (−6.9) | 28.3 (−2.1) | 41.0 (5.0) | 53.3 (11.8) | 62.0 (16.7) | 67.8 (19.9) | 66.4 (19.1) | 59.1 (15.1) | 46.5 (8.1) | 34.7 (1.5) | 24.3 (−4.3) | 43.4 (6.3) |
| Mean daily minimum °F (°C) | 7.2 (−13.8) | 9.0 (−12.8) | 17.8 (−7.9) | 30.3 (−0.9) | 41.6 (5.3) | 50.7 (10.4) | 56.8 (13.8) | 54.9 (12.7) | 46.0 (7.8) | 36.0 (2.2) | 25.1 (−3.8) | 15.2 (−9.3) | 32.6 (0.3) |
| Mean minimum °F (°C) | −12.3 (−24.6) | −7.7 (−22.1) | −2.5 (−19.2) | 20.2 (−6.6) | 29.8 (−1.2) | 39.9 (4.4) | 48.5 (9.2) | 44.5 (6.9) | 32.3 (0.2) | 23.9 (−4.5) | 11.3 (−11.5) | −3.9 (−19.9) | −15.6 (−26.4) |
| Record low °F (°C) | −26 (−32) | −20 (−29) | −16 (−27) | 11 (−12) | 24 (−4) | 30 (−1) | 42 (6) | 35 (2) | 25 (−4) | 15 (−9) | 2 (−17) | −24 (−31) | −26 (−32) |
| Average precipitation inches (mm) | 3.48 (88) | 3.06 (78) | 3.82 (97) | 4.08 (104) | 3.65 (93) | 4.92 (125) | 4.12 (105) | 3.92 (100) | 3.51 (89) | 5.64 (143) | 4.34 (110) | 4.36 (111) | 48.9 (1,243) |
| Average snowfall inches (cm) | 18.7 (47) | 22.2 (56) | 17.9 (45) | 5.4 (14) | 0.2 (0.51) | 0.0 (0.0) | 0.0 (0.0) | 0.0 (0.0) | 0.0 (0.0) | 0.4 (1.0) | 4.5 (11) | 16.8 (43) | 86.1 (217.51) |
| Average extreme snow depth inches (cm) | 16.4 (42) | 20.9 (53) | 21.5 (55) | 9.5 (24) | 0.2 (0.51) | 0.0 (0.0) | 0.0 (0.0) | 0.0 (0.0) | 0.0 (0.0) | 0.7 (1.8) | 3.3 (8.4) | 11.3 (29) | 24.7 (63) |
| Average precipitation days (≥ 0.01 in.) | 10.2 | 8.7 | 9.5 | 10.4 | 12.2 | 12.6 | 12.4 | 10.1 | 9.2 | 11.0 | 10.3 | 11.2 | 127.8 |
| Average snowy days (≥ 0.1 in) | 7.9 | 6.5 | 5.6 | 1.8 | 0.1 | 0.0 | 0.0 | 0.0 | 0.0 | 0.3 | 2.4 | 6.4 | 31.0 |
Source 1: NOAA
Source 2: National Weather Service (mean maxima/minima, snow depth 2006–2020)

== Demographics ==
Historical population
| Census | Pop. | Note | %± |
|---|---|---|---|
| 1800 | 359 | | — |
| 1810 | 944 | | 163.0% |
| 1820 | 1,219 | | 29.1% |
| 1830 | 1,599 | | 31.2% |
| 1840 | 1,829 | | 14.4% |
| 1850 | 1,732 | | −5.3% |
| 1860 | 1,731 | | −0.1% |
| 1870 | 1,451 | | −16.2% |
| 1880 | 1,306 | | −10.0% |
| 1890 | 1,064 | | −18.5% |
| 1900 | 946 | | −11.1% |
| 1910 | 955 | | 1.0% |
| 1920 | 885 | | −7.3% |
| 1930 | 750 | | −15.3% |
| 1940 | 761 | | 1.5% |
| 1950 | 755 | | −0.8% |
| 1960 | 712 | | −5.7% |
| 1970 | 725 | | 1.8% |
| 1980 | 969 | | 33.7% |
| 1990 | 1,175 | | 21.3% |
| 2000 | 1,297 | | 10.4% |
| 2010 | 1,407 | | 8.5% |
| 2020 | 1,458 | | 3.6% |
U.S. Decennial Census

=== 2010 census ===
As of the census of 2010, there were 1,407 people, 585 households, and 405 families living in the town. The population density was 30.5 inhabitants per square mile (11.8/km^{2}). There were 700 housing units at an average density of 15.2 per square mile (5.9/km^{2}). The racial makeup of the town was 97.4% White, 0.1% African American, 0.9% Native American, 0.1% from other races, and 1.5% from two or more races. Hispanic or Latino of any race were 0.9% of the population.

There were 585 households, of which 30.3% had children under the age of 18 living with them, 54.4% were married couples living together, 10.3% had a female householder with no husband present, 4.6% had a male householder with no wife present, and 30.8% were non-families. 24.3% of all households were made up of individuals, and 9.6% had someone living alone who was 65 years of age or older. The average household size was 2.41 and the average family size was 2.80.

The median age in the town was 43.7 years. 22.2% of residents were under the age of 18; 6.6% were between the ages of 18 and 24; 23.6% were from 25 to 44; 32.9% were from 45 to 64; and 14.6% were 65 years of age or older. The gender makeup of the town was 50.0% male and 50.0% female.

=== 2000 census ===
As of the census of 2000, there were 1,297 people, 518 households, and 360 families living in the town. The population density was 28.2 inhabitants per square mile (10.9/km^{2}). There were 598 housing units at an average density of 13.0 per square mile (5.0/km^{2}). The racial makeup of the town was 98.92% White, 0.23% African American, 0.23% Native American, 0.31% Asian, 0.08% from other races, and 0.23% from two or more races. Hispanic or Latino of any race were 0.46% of the population.

There were 518 households, out of which 30.1% had children under the age of 18 living with them, 58.7% were married couples living together, 6.8% had a female householder with no husband present, and 30.5% were non-families. 23.2% of all households were made up of individuals, and 9.8% had someone living alone who was 65 years of age or older. The average household size was 2.50 and the average family size was 2.99.

In the town, the population was spread out, with 24.5% under the age of 18, 7.3% from 18 to 24, 27.8% from 25 to 44, 28.0% from 45 to 64, and 12.3% who were 65 years of age or older. The median age was 41 years. For every 100 females, there were 100.2 males. For every 100 females age 18 and over, there were 98.2 males.

The median income for a household in the town was $33,083, and the median income for a family was $37,171. Males had a median income of $29,118 versus $21,927 for females. The per capita income for the town was $15,690. About 12.3% of families and 15.6% of the population were below the poverty line, including 31.2% of those under age 18 and 5.5% of those age 65 or over.

== Notable people ==
- Barry Longyear, author
- Melanie Sachs, member of the Maine House of Representatives
