= Sherman, Maine =

Town in Maine, United States

- Town
- Location of Sherman, Maine
- Coordinates: 45°53′20″N 68°22′32″W
- Country: United States
- State: Maine
- County: Aroostook
- Villages: Sherman; Sherman Mills; Woodbridge Corner

Area
  - Total: 40.53 sq mi (104.97 km^{2})
  - Land: 40.04 sq mi (103.70 km^{2})
  - Water: 0.49 sq mi (1.27 km^{2})
- Elevation: 630 ft (190 m)

Population (2020)
  - Total: 815
  - Density: 20/sq mi (7.9/km^{2})
- Time zone: UTC-5 (Eastern (EST))
  - Summer (DST): UTC-4 (EDT)
- ZIP Code: 04776
- Area code: 207
- FIPS code: 23-67790
- GNIS feature ID: 582723

Sherman is a town in Aroostook County, Maine, United States. The population was 815 at the 2020 census.

== Geography ==
According to the United States Census Bureau, the town has a total area of 40.53 square miles (104.97 km^{2}), of which 40.04 square miles (103.70 km^{2}) is land and 0.49 square miles (1.27 km^{2}) is water.

== Demographics ==
Historical population
Census	Pop.	Note	%±
1850	194		—
1870	701		—
1880	798		13.8%
1890	909		13.9%
1900	980		7.8%
1910	1,053		7.4%
1920	1,134		7.7%
1930	1,027		−9.4%
1940	1,058		3.0%
1950	1,029		−2.7%
1960	1,034		0.5%
1970	949		−8.2%
1980	1,021		7.6%
1990	1,027		0.6%
2000	937		−8.8%
2010	848		−9.5%
2020	815		−3.9%
U.S. Decennial Census

=== 2010 census ===
As of the census of 2010, there were 848 people, 363 households, and 247 families living in the town. The population density was 21.2 inhabitants per square mile (8.2/km^{2}). There were 452 housing units at an average density of 11.3 per square mile (4.4/km^{2}). The racial makeup of the town was 97.9% White, 1.2% Native American, and 0.9% from two or more races.

There were 363 households, of which 22.9% had children under the age of 18 living with them, 55.1% were married couples living together, 8.5% had a female householder with no husband present, 4.4% had a male householder with no wife present, and 32.0% were non-families. 26.2% of all households were made up of individuals, and 11.8% had someone living alone who was 65 years of age or older. The average household size was 2.34 and the average family size was 2.77.

The median age in the town was 48.8 years. 19% of residents were under the age of 18; 5% were between the ages of 18 and 24; 21.4% were from 25 to 44; 35.4% were from 45 to 64; and 19.2% were 65 years of age or older. The gender makeup of the town was 50.0% male and 50.0% female.

=== 2000 census ===
As of the census of 2000, there were 458 people, 374 households, and 289 families living in the town. The population density was 23.2 people per square mile (9.0/km^{2}). There were 449 housing units at an average density of 11.1 per square mile (4.3/km^{2}). The racial makeup of the town was 97.87% White, 0.32% African American, 0.75% Native American, 0.21% from other races, and 0.85% from two or more races. Hispanic or Latino of any race were 0.21% of the population.

There were 374 households, out of which 31.3% had children under the age of 18 living with them, 68.7% were married couples living together, 5.9% had a female householder with no husband present, and 22.5% were non-families. 20.3% of all households were made up of individuals, and 11.2% had someone living alone who was 65 years of age or older. The average household size was 2.51 and the average family size was 2.84.

In the town, the age distribution of the population was: 23.4% under the age of 18, 5.2% from 18 to 24, 25.3% from 25 to 44, 28.9% from 45 to 64, and 17.2% who were 65 years of age or older. The median age was 42 years. For every 100 females, there were 100.6 males. For every 100 females age 18 and over, there were 94.1 males.

The median income for a household in the town was $27,574, and the median income for a family was $32,500. Males had a median income of $34,821 versus $20,694 for females. The per capita income for the town was $14,524. About 11.2% of families and 13.5% of the population were below the poverty line, including 16.3% of those under age 18 and 14.2% of those age 65 or over.
