= List of U.S. Highways in Maine =

United States Numbered Highways in Maine
- Standard markers for US Highways in Maine

System information
- Maintained by MaineDOT
- Formed: November 11, 1926

Highway names
- Interstates: Interstate x (I-X)
- US Highways: U.S. Route x (US-X)
- State: State Route x or Route x (SR X)

System links
- Maine State Highway System; Interstate; US; State; Auto trails; Lettered highways

== Primary routes ==
Note about termini: In several cases there is disagreement between the administrative termini of a route (which is defined by MaineDOT) and the termini signed in the field. All termini listed on this page are administrative termini; discrepancies are listed on the respective pages.

Number	Length (mi)	Length (km)	Southern or western terminus	Northern or eastern terminus	Formed	Removed	Notes
US 1	527.19	848.43	US 1 in Portsmouth, NH	Route 161 in Clair, NB	1926	current	Mostly follows the old New England Route 1 and New England Route 24
US 2	273.64	440.38	US 2 in Shelburne, NH	I-95 in Houlton	1926	current	Mostly follows the old New England Route 15
US 201	157.46	253.41	US 1 / SR 24 in Brunswick	SR 6 / Route 173 near Saint-Theophile, QC	1926	current	Mostly follows the old New England Route 20
US 202	168.52	271.21	US 202 / NH 11 in Rochester, NH	I-395 / US 1A / SR 15 in Bangor	1936	current	Currently signed with US 1A into downtown Bangor at US 2, but was truncated to I-395 in 1989. Does not officially intersect with US 2.
US 302	54.15	87.15	US 302 in Conway, NH	I-295 / US 1 / SR 100 in Portland	1935	current	Mostly follows the old New England Route 18; Currently signed with SR 100 to end at Park Ave (formerly US 1), but was truncated in 2007 when US 1 was shifted onto I-295.

== Alternate and auxiliary routes ==
Number	Length (mi)	Length (km)	Southern or western terminus	Northern or eastern terminus	Formed	Removed	Notes
US 1 Byp.	1.5	2.4	US 1 Byp. in Portsmouth	US 1 in Kittery	c. 1960	current	Originally designated US 1A, also designated I-95 until 1972
US 1 Bus.	3.4	5.5	US 1 in Newcastle	US 1 in Damariscotta	1963	current	Formerly US 1
US 1 Bus.	3.6	5.8	—	—	1951	1960	Former alignment of US 1, redesignated US 1 in 1960
US 1 Bus.	2.6	4.2	—	—	1955	1956	Redesignated US 1A Business, which was later decommissioned
US 1A	7.0	11.3	US 1 in York	US 1 in York	1936	current	York segment
US 1A	3.5	5.6	I-295 / US 1 in Portland	I-295 / US 1 in Portland	1951	current	Portland segment
US 1A	1.6	2.6	US 1 in Rockland	US 1 in Rockland	1941	current	Rockland segment; redesignated US 1 Bypass in 1963 but reverted to US 1A in 1987
US 1A	54.0	86.9	US 1 / SR 3 in Stockton Springs	US 1 / SR 3 in Ellsworth	1966	current	Stockton Springs-Ellsworth segment; formerly US 1
US 1A	7.8	12.6	US 1 in Milbridge	US 1 in Harrington	1936	current	Milbridge-Harrington segment
US 1A	8.1	13.0	US 1 in Jonesboro	US 1 in Machias	1936	current	Jonesboro-Machias segment
US 1A	49.8	80.1	US 1 in Mars Hill	US 1 in Van Buren	1940	current	Mars Hill-Van Buren segment, formerly US 1.
US 1A Bus.	—	—	—	—	1955	—	Unsigned designation for a former alignment of US 1 in Bangor, now unnumbered.
US 2A	4.6	7.4	US 2 in Orono	US 2 / SR 43 in Old Town	1954	current	Southern segment, formerly US 2
US 2A	43.5	70.0	US 2 in Macwahoc Plantation	US 1 / US 2 in Houlton	1936	current	Northern segment, formerly SR 166
US 201A	26.18	42.13	US 2 / US 201 / SR 104 in Skowhegan	US 201 / SR 8 in Solon	1954	current	Formerly US 201; now completely overlaid with other routes
Former
