= Maine State Highway System =

Highway system in the United States

- Standard markers in Maine

System information
- Length: 22,236 mi (35,785 km)

Highway names
- Interstates: Interstate x (I-X)
- US Highways: U.S. Route x (US-X)
- State: State Route x or Route x (SR X)

System links
- Maine State Highway System; Interstate; US; State; Auto trails; Lettered highways

The Maine State Highway System is maintained by the Maine Department of Transportation (MaineDOT) as a system of numbered highways, defined as the "connected main highways throughout the state which primarily serve arterial or through traffic." As of 2006, 22,236 miles (35,785 km) of roadway are included in the highway system, including Interstate highways, U.S. Routes, state highways, and other urban and rural local roads.

== Route types and funding ==
=== Interstate Highways ===
Maine has one primary Interstate Highway, Interstate 95 (I-95), within its borders, as well as four related routes: I-195, I-295, I-395, and the unsigned I-495. All Interstate Highways in Maine are part of the National Highway System and, as such, receive some degree of federal funding. All of these highways are freeways and are built under set standards for roadway design.

=== U.S. Numbered Highways ===
Maine contains two primary U.S. numbered highways: U.S. Route 1 (US 1) and US 2. US 1 has a bypass and business route as well as several alternate alignments designated US 1A. US 1 also has a "child" route—the intrastate US 201, a spur route north to the Canadian border which also has its own alternate, designated US 201A.

US 2 has two alternate alignments designated US 2A as well as two child routes: US 202, a southwestern spur stretching to Delaware, and US 302, a western loop connecting US 1 in Portland to US 2 in Montpelier, Vermont.

These routes are generally maintained and funded in the same manner as state routes, with these responsibilities falling to MaineDOT.

=== State Routes ===
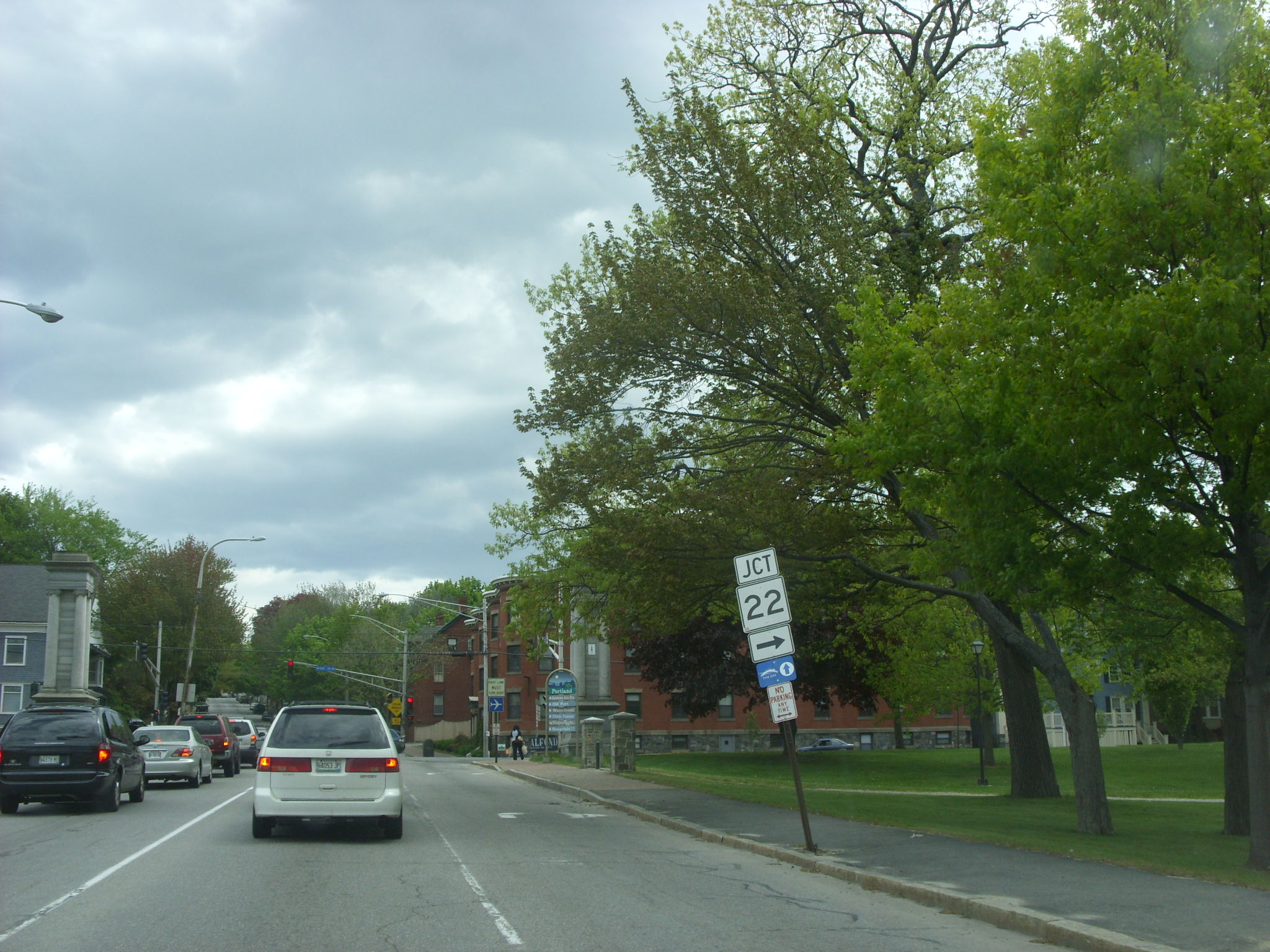
SR 22 intersection on SR 77

State routes are numbered and signed by the state, and by extension are also generally maintained and funded by the state, except in areas designated as "urban compact areas", defined by MaineDOT as "those in which the population according to the last United States census exceeds 7,500 inhabitants. Urban compact municipalities are also those in which the population according to the last United States census is less than 7,500 inhabitants but more than 2,499 inhabitants, and in which the ratio of people whose place of employment is in a given municipality to employed people residing in that same municipality according to the last United States census is 1.0 or greater." In this case, the section of road is the responsibility of the municipality.

=== State-aid highways ===
State-aid highways are roads chosen by the local municipality which serve as links between other state routes. Winter snow removal is the responsibility of the municipality, while other maintenance and funding is handled by the state, with the exception of urban compact areas.

=== Townways ===
Townways in Maine are classified as all highways that do not fall into one of the preceding categories. These roads are chosen, funded, and maintained by the towns, or the county in unorganized areas. The vast majority of highways in the state fall under this category. These also represent the closest thing to county roads in the state, as Maine does not have signed county roads as other states such as New York do.

== Signage practices ==
I-95 marker used in Maine

Maine uses standard-size Interstate shields on its Interstate Highways. Many of Maine's Interstate shields contain the state name, and others do not. I-95 shields on the Maine Turnpike are generally accompanied by Maine Turnpike markers. The Falmouth Spur, designated I-495 in 2004, is unsigned.

US 201A marker used in Maine

Maine uses standard shields for U.S. Routes, a white six-point shield on a black border. Square signs are used one- and two-digit routes and rectangular for three-digit routes. Maine also has two business U.S. Routes, indicated by banners complementing the corresponding route shields. Maine also has a US 1 Bypass, indicated in the same way, with a bypass shield.

SR 4 marker used in Maine

Maine's route marker is a simple black-on-white design, nearly identical to route markers used in Massachusetts. One- and two-digit numbered routes use 24-by-24-inch (610 mm × 610 mm) or 36-by-36-inch (910 mm × 910 mm) signs while three-digit numbered routes use 30-by-24-inch (760 mm × 610 mm) or 45-by-36-inch (1,140 mm × 910 mm) signs.

Maine has three business state routes, indicated with a "Business" banner accompanying the route shield.
