= List of Interstate Highways in Maine =

Interstate Highways in Maine
- Standard markers for Interstate Highways in Maine
- Interstate Highways highlighted in red

System information
- Maintained by MaineDOT
- Formed: June 29, 1957

Highway names
- Interstates: Interstate x (I-X)
- US Highways: U.S. Route x (US-X)
- State: State Route x or Route x (SR X)

System links
- Maine State Highway System; Interstate; US; State; Auto trails; Lettered highways

== List ==
Note about termini: In several cases there is disagreement between the administrative termini of a route (which is defined by MaineDOT) and the termini signed in the field. All termini listed on this page are administrative termini; discrepancies are listed on the respective pages.

Number	Length (mi)	Length (km)	Southern or western terminus	Northern or eastern terminus	Formed	Removed	Notes
I-95	303.2	488.0	I-95 in Portsmouth, NH	Route 95 in Woodstock, NB (Houlton–Woodstock Border Crossing)	1956	current	Realigned in 2004, former toll-free alignment designated I-295
I-195	1.55	2.49	I-95	SR 5	1982	current	
I-295	53.61	86.28	I-95	I-95	1956	current	Extended in 2004, alignment north of the Falmouth Spur was originally I-95
I-395	5.00	8.05	I-95/SR 15	US 1A	1959	current	
I-495	—	—	I-95	I-95	1988	2004	Former designation of the Maine Turnpike north of the Falmouth Spur, redesignated I-95 in 2004
I-495	4.41	7.10	I-95 (Maine Turnpike)	US 1	2004	current	Unsigned, formerly I-95 prior to 2004 renumbering; known as the Falmouth Spur
Former

== See also ==
- Maine Turnpike
