= Sumner, Maine =

Town in Maine, United States

- Town
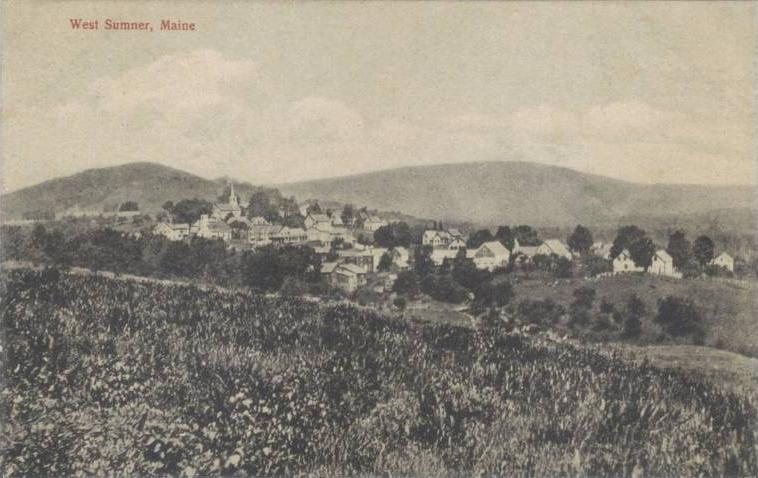
- West Sumner c. 1910

- Location within Maine Location within the United States
- Coordinates: 44°22′03″N 70°26′16″W
- Country: United States
- State: Maine
- County: Oxford
- Incorporated: 1798

Area
  - Total: 44.87 sq mi (116.21 km^{2})
  - Land: 44.27 sq mi (114.66 km^{2})
  - Water: 0.60 sq mi (1.55 km^{2})
- Elevation: 472 ft (144 m)

Population (2020)
  - Total: 994
  - Density: 23/sq mi (8.7/km^{2})
- Time zone: UTC-5 (Eastern (EST))
  - Summer (DST): UTC-4 (EDT)
- ZIP Codes: 04292 (Sumner); 04220 (Buckfield); 04289 (West Paris)
- Area code: 207
- FIPS code: 23-75035
- GNIS feature ID: 582755
- Website: www.townofsumner.me

Sumner is a town in Oxford County, Maine, United States. Sumner is included in the Lewiston-Auburn, Maine metropolitan New England City and Town Area. The population was 994 at the 2020 census. The town includes the villages of West Sumner and East Sumner.

== History ==
Originally called West Butterfield Plantation, it was first settled in 1783 by Noah Bosworth from Plympton, Massachusetts. Most of the early settlers were Revolutionary soldiers from Plymouth County, Massachusetts. The town was incorporated by the General Court on June 13, 1798, and named for Increase Sumner, who was then the governor of Massachusetts.

Despite an uneven and somewhat broken surface, the town's principal occupation became agriculture. The two branches of the Nezinscot River provided water power for mills. By 1859, when the population was 1,151, Sumner had three sawmills, two gristmills, two shingle mills, a starch factory, a clover mill (to clean clover seeds, food for cattle), and a powder mill. The Rumford Falls and Buckfield Railroad opened a station near East Sumner in 1878.

== Geography ==
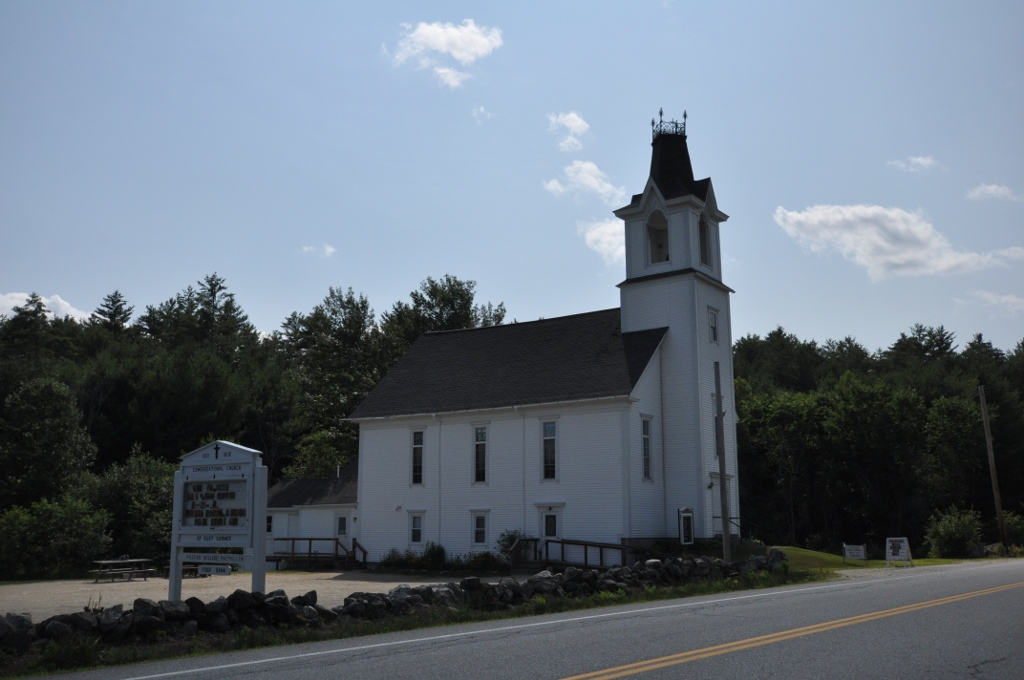
Congregational Church of East Sumner

According to the United States Census Bureau, the town has a total area of 44.87 square miles (116.21 km^{2}), of which 44.27 square miles (114.66 km^{2}) is land and 0.60 square miles (1.55 km^{2}) is water. It is drained by the east and west branches of the Nezinscot River. The town is bordered by Peru to the north, Hartford to the east, Buckfield to the south, and Paris and Woodstock to the west.

Sumner is served by state routes 140 and 219.

== Demographics ==
Historical population
Census	Pop.	Note	%±
1800	330		—
1810	611		85.2%
1820	1,055		72.7%
1830	1,098		4.1%
1840	1,269		15.6%
1850	1,151		−9.3%
1860	1,154		0.3%
1870	1,170		1.4%
1880	1,014		−13.3%
1890	901		−11.1%
1900	802		−11.0%
1910	762		−5.0%
1920	670		−12.1%
1930	867		29.4%
1940	541		−37.6%
1950	526		−2.8%
1960	481		−8.6%
1970	525		9.1%
1980	613		16.8%
1990	761		24.1%
2000	854		12.2%
2010	939		10.0%
2020	994		5.9%
U.S. Decennial Census

=== 2010 census ===
As of the census of 2010, there were 939 people, 383 households, and 266 families living in the town. The population density was 21.2 inhabitants per square mile (8.2/km^{2}). There were 565 housing units at an average density of 12.8 per square mile (4.9/km^{2}). The racial makeup of the town was 97.4% White, 0.4% African American, 0.5% Native American, 0.3% Asian, 0.5% from other races, and 0.7% from two or more races. Hispanic or Latino of any race were 2.0% of the population.

There were 383 households, of which 26.9% had children under the age of 18 living with them, 59.3% were married couples living together, 4.7% had a female householder with no husband present, 5.5% had a male householder with no wife present, and 30.5% were non-families. 21.9% of all households were made up of individuals, and 9.7% had someone living alone who was 65 years of age or older. The average household size was 2.45 and the average family size was 2.85.

The median age in the town was 45.5 years. 20.7% of residents were under the age of 18; 6.7% were between the ages of 18 and 24; 21.4% were from 25 to 44; 36.5% were from 45 to 64; and 14.7% were 65 years of age or older. The gender makeup of the town was 50.9% male and 49.1% female.

=== 2000 census ===
As of the census of 2000, there were 854 people, 330 households, and 248 families living in the town. The population density was 19.3 people per square mile (7.5/km^{2}). There were 488 housing units at an average density of 11.0 per square mile (4.3/km^{2}). The racial makeup of the town was 98.59% White, 0.12% African American, 0.47% Native American, 0.23% from other races, and 0.59% from two or more races. Hispanic or Latino of any race were 0.47% of the population.

There were 330 households, out of which 28.8% had children under the age of 18 living with them, 61.2% were married couples living together, 7.9% had a female householder with no husband present, and 24.8% were non-families. 18.2% of all households were made up of individuals, and 7.6% had someone living alone who was 65 years of age or older. The average household size was 2.59 and the average family size was 2.87.

In the town, the population was spread out, with 23.4% under the age of 18, 6.2% from 18 to 24, 28.2% from 25 to 44, 31.5% from 45 to 64, and 10.7% who were 65 years of age or older. The median age was 40 years. For every 100 females, there were 98.1 males. For every 100 females age 18 and over, there were 101.2 males.

The median income for a household in the town was $39,196, and the median income for a family was $41,786. Males had a median income of $31,806 versus $23,500 for females. The per capita income for the town was $17,370. About 7.7% of families and 11.0% of the population were below the poverty line, including 26.1% of those under age 18 and 2.4% of those age 65 or over.

== Notable person ==
- Samuel F. Hersey, US congressman; lumber baron
