= Maine State Route 108 =

State highway in Maine, US

State Route 108

Route information
- Maintained by MaineDOT
- Length: 26.64 mi (42.87 km)

Major junctions
- West end: US 2 in Rumford
- SR 140 in Canton; SR 4 in Livermore
- East end: SR 219 in Turner

Location
- Country: United States
- State: Maine
- Counties: Oxford, Androscoggin

Highway system
- Maine State Highway System; Interstate; US; State; Auto trails; Lettered highways
← SR 107	→ SR 109

State Route 108 (SR 108) is part of Maine's system of numbered state highways, located in Oxford and Androscoggin counties. Its western terminus is in Rumford, at the intersection with U.S. Route 2 (US 2). Its eastern terminus is at Turner, at the intersection with SR 219.

== Route description ==
SR 108 begins at US 2 at Rumford. The route travels east along Bridge Street, first immediately crossing the Androscoggin River on Morse Bridge, a steel through arch bridge constructed in 1935. After passing a few offices, the road crosses a branch of the Androscoggin River on Upper Canal Bridge, a simple steel girder bridge. The road heads northeast passing to the south of Rumford Mill before making a curve to the southeast closely following the southern banks of the Androscoggin River. SR 108 mostly heads through rural wooded areas except when it heads through the town center of Peru. Near Gilbertville, the highway breaks off of its close following of the river and heads south into Canton where it intersects State Route 140 in the town center.

Continuing southeast, SR 108 still passes through forested areas. It briefly clips the town of Hartford before entering Livermore, Androscoggin County. SR 108 carries the name Canton Road as it heads towards the town center. After passing Brettuns Pond, SR 108 makes a turn onto Church Street towards the east and SR 4. Canton Road continues south as a state-maintained highway signed as SR 108 but not officially designated as such by the Maine Department of Transportation. At SR 4, SR 108 forms a concurrency and together head east for about one mile (1.6 km) on Federal Road. After the concurrency with SR 4, the road keeps going south to Turner where the road ends at SR 219 just west of its crossing of the Androscoggin River.

== Major junctions ==
County	Location	mi	km	Destinations	Notes
Oxford	Rumford	0.00	0.00	US 2 (Franklin Street / Bridge Street) – Bethel, Mexico	
Oxford	Androscoggin River	0.01– 0.06	0.016– 0.097	Morse Bridge	
Oxford	Canton	15.67	25.22	SR 140 (Main Street / School Street) – Jay, Buckfield	
Androscoggin	Livermore	21.10	33.96	SR 4 south (Federal Road) – Turner, Auburn	Western end of SR 4 concurrency
Androscoggin	Livermore	22.14	35.63	SR 4 north (Federal Road) – Livermore Falls	Eastern end of SR 4 concurrency
Androscoggin	Turner	26.64	42.87	SR 219 (Howes Corner Road) – Wayne, North Turner	
1.000 mi = 1.609 km; 1.000 km = 0.621 mi: Concurrency terminus
