= Maine State Route 219 =

East-west state highway in Maine, US

State Route 219

Route information
- Maintained by MaineDOT
- Length: 35.1 mi (56.5 km)
- Existed: 1933–present

Major junctions
- West end: Greenwood Road in Greenwood
- SR 26 in West Paris; SR 4 in Turner
- East end: SR 133 in Wayne

Location
- Country: United States
- State: Maine
- Counties: Oxford, Androscoggin, Kennebec

Highway system
- Maine State Highway System; Interstate; US; State; Auto trails; Lettered highways
← SR 218	→ SR 220

State Route 219 (abbreviated SR 219) is part of Maine's system of numbered state highways, located in the western central part of the state. It runs for 35.1 miles (56.5 km) from the town center of Greenwood to an intersection with State Route 133 in Wayne.

SR 219 runs through parts of Oxford, Androscoggin and Kennebec counties.

== Route description ==
SR 219 begins in the west at Greenwood Road in the town center of Greenwood. From this intersection, SR 219 proceeds eastward and crosses into West Paris where it intersects with SR 26. The two routes share a brief overlap before SR 219 continues northeast into Sumner. The highway continues through the center of town and intersects with SR 140 just feet shy of the Nezinscot River.

SR 140 turns east along SR 219 and the two routes cross the river into Hartford. After a 1.8-mile (2.9 km) concurrency, SR 140 splits off to the north while SR 219 turns southeast and crosses into the northern part of Turner in Androscoggin County. SR 219 crosses SR 4 and intersects both the northern terminus of SR 117 and eastern terminus of SR 108 before crossing the Androscoggin River into Leeds. Continuing east, SR 219 intersects, and briefly overlaps with, SR 106 before crossing into Wayne and Kennebec County. SR 219 meets its eastern terminus at SR 133 shortly thereafter, located near the northern tip of Androscoggin Lake.

== History ==
Modern SR 219, as first designated in 1933, was approximately 16 miles (26 km) in length and ran between SR 140 in Hartford and its current eastern terminus at SR 133 in Wayne. A minor routing shift was made near Bear Pond in 1937–8; the highway, which once ran along the north side of the pond, now runs along the south side. The old routing is still present as unnumbered local roadways. By 1941, SR 219 had been extended westward along a concurrency with SR 140, then through entirely new routing through Sumner and West Paris to the current western terminus in Greenwood.

The first highway in Maine designated SR 219 ran between Rumford and South Arm north of Andover in 1928. This is now the northernmost stretch of SR 5, although the route to South Arm was later truncated to what is now the intersection of SR 5 and SR 120 in Andover.

== Major intersections ==
County	Location	mi	km	Destinations	Notes
Oxford	Greenwood	0.0	0.0	Greenwood Road – Norway, Bethel	Western terminus of SR 219
Oxford	West Paris	5.6	9.0	SR 26 south (Bethel Road) – Paris, Norway	Southern terminus of SR 26 / SR 219 concurrency
Oxford	West Paris	5.7	9.2	SR 26 north (South Main Street) – Woodstock, Bethel	Southern terminus of SR 26 / SR 219 concurrency
Oxford	Sumner	17.3	27.8	SR 140 south (Butterfield Road) – Buckfield	Western terminus of SR 140 / SR 219 concurrency
Oxford	Hartford	19.1	30.7	SR 140 north (Main Street) – Canton, Jay	Eastern terminus of SR 140 / SR 219 concurrency
Androscoggin	Turner	25.6	41.2	SR 4 (Auburn Road) – Auburn, Livermore Falls	
Androscoggin	Turner	27.7	44.6	SR 117 south (North Parish Road) – Turner, Buckfield	Northern terminus of SR 117
Androscoggin	Turner	29.4	47.3	SR 108 west (Boothby Road) – Livermore, Canton	Eastern terminus of SR 108
Androscoggin	Leeds	31.6	50.9	SR 106 north – Livermore Falls	Western terminus of SR 106 / SR 219 concurrency
Androscoggin	Leeds	32.3	52.0	SR 106 south – Leeds	Eastern terminus of SR 106 / SR 219 concurrency
Kennebec	Wayne	35.1	56.5	SR 133 – Livermore Falls, Wayne	Eastern terminus of SR 219
1.000 mi = 1.609 km; 1.000 km = 0.621 mi: Concurrency terminus
