= Rumford Branch =

Railroad line in Maine, US

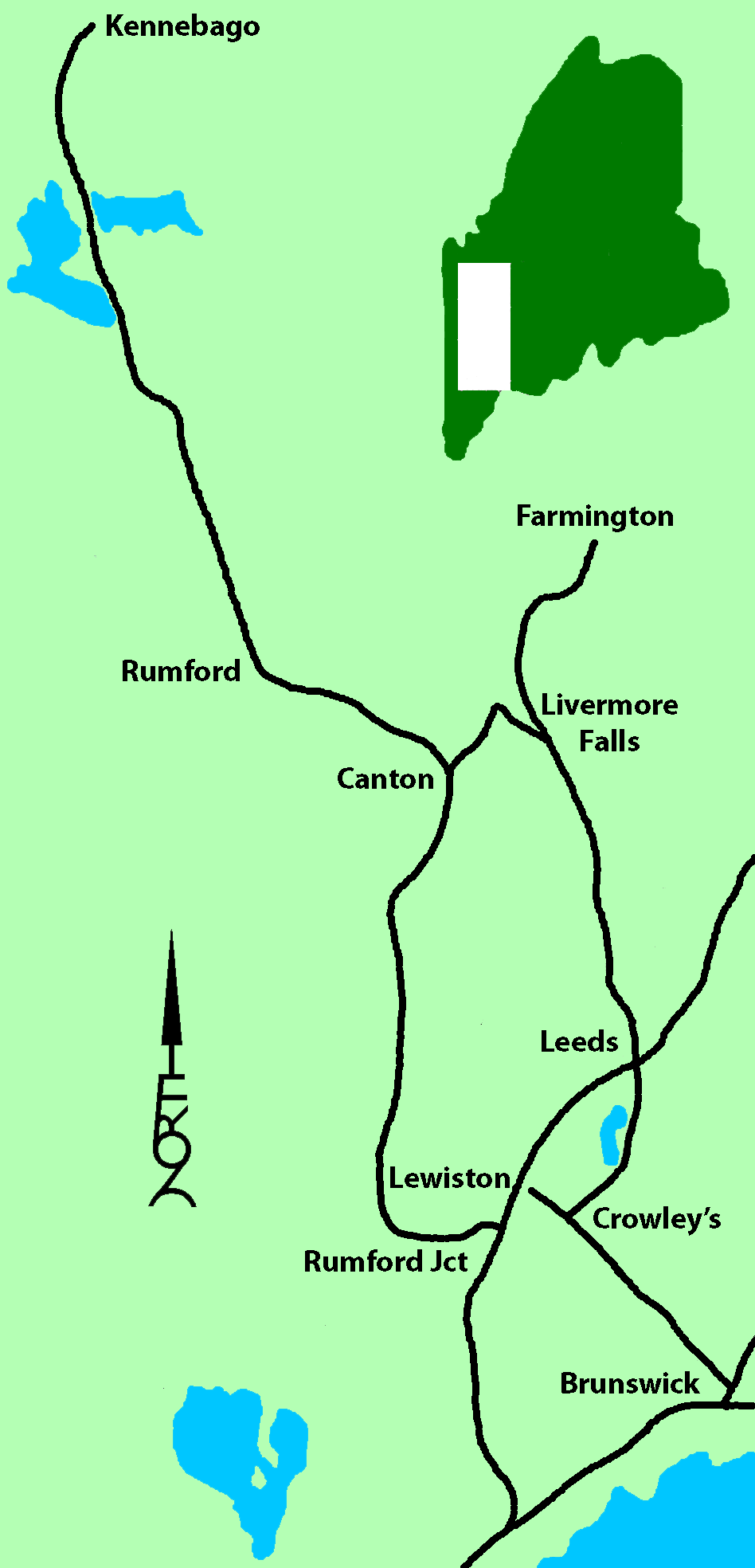
Maine Central Railroad Rangeley branch, Livermore Falls branch, Farmington branch and Lewiston branch in 1917.

The Rumford Branch is a railroad line in the state of Maine, in the United States. It runs 47 miles (76 km) from Leeds Junction to Rumford, traveling up the Androscoggin River valley, passing through Livermore Falls and terminating at Rumford. The branch comprises the remaining trackage of three earlier branches, all built by predecessors of the Maine Central Railroad in the 19th century. Today, CSX Transportation owns the branch.

The branch comprises the remaining trackage of three earlier branches:

- The first 20.1 miles are the former Farmington Branch from Crowley's Junction on the Lewiston Branch through Leeds Junction and Livermore Falls to Wilton and Farmington.
- The next 11 miles are the former Livermore Falls Branch from Canton to Livermore Falls.
- The last 16.1 miles are the former Rangeley Branch from Rumford Junction on the Maine Central Back Road through Canton and Rumford to Kennebago north of Rangeley Lake.

Traffic over the Rangeley branch decreased after adjacent timberlands had been harvested. Summer passenger trains between Oquossoc and Kennebago were replaced in 1933 by a railbus built in the Sandy River and Rangeley Lakes Railroad shops. The Rangeley branch north of Rumford was abandoned and dismantled following damage in the 1936 flood. The southern end of the Farmington branch from Leeds Junction to Crowley Junction on the Lewiston lower branch was dismantled in 1938. The southern end of the Rangeley branch from Rumford Junction to Canton was dismantled in 1952. The last passenger train to Farmington was in 1957.

== Route mileposts ==
- Milepost 0: Leeds Junction on the Maine Central Back Road
- Milepost 7.3: Leeds Center
- Milepost 20.1: Livermore Falls former junction with the Farmington Branch north to the narrow-gauge Sandy River and Rangeley Lakes Railroad interchange at Farmington
- Milepost 24.8: Riley's large paper mill originating or terminating 17,000 annual carloads in 1973.
- Milepost 31.1: Canton former junction with the Rangeley Branch south through Mechanic Falls to Rumford Junction on the Maine Central Back Road near Auburn.
- Milepost 47.2: Rumford and Rumford Mill originating or terminating 11,000 annual carloads in 1973.

== History ==
Map of the Androscoggin Railroad, later divided into the Lewiston and Farmington branches

The Androscoggin Railroad was chartered in 1848 to build a Portland gauge railroad to Farmington, Maine from Leeds Junction on the Portland gauge Androscoggin and Kennebec Railroad. The railway was completed to Livermore Falls in 1852, and to Farmington in 1859. The railway was then extended south from Leeds Junction to Brunswick to connect with the standard gauge Kennebec and Portland Railroad in 1861. Conversion of the Androscoggin Railroad to standard gauge that year initiated a series of court battles ultimately eliminating Maine's Portland gauge rail network. Maine Central leased the Androscoggin Railroad in 1871, and converted its own line to standard gauge in 1873. The southern end of the Androscoggin Railroad adjacent to the Androscoggin River from Brunswick to Crowley Junction became the Lewiston branch of the Maine Central, while the remainder of the line to Farmington became the Farmington branch.

=== Farmington Branch ===
- Milepost 0: Crowley's Junction with the Maine Central Lewiston Lower Branch [CW]
- Milepost 4.3: Sabattus [BA]
- Milepost 11.2: Leeds Junction [JE] with the Maine Central Back Road
- Milepost 13: Highmoor
- Milepost 15.6: Curtis Corner
- Milepost 18.5: Leeds Center [RM]
- Milepost 21.3: North Leeds [N]
- Milepost 23.5: Strickland [SF]
- Milepost 26.2: East Livermore
- Milepost 31.3: Livermore Falls junction with the Maine Central Livermore Falls Branch [CD]
- Milepost 33.5: Jay [BY]
- Milepost 37: North Jay [NX]
- Milepost 40.6: Wilton [WO]
- Milepost 42.9: East Wilton [RB]
- Milepost 47.1: West Farmington [MS]
- Milepost 47.8: Farmington [FD] interchange with the Sandy River and Rangeley Lakes Railroad

=== Lewiston Branch ===
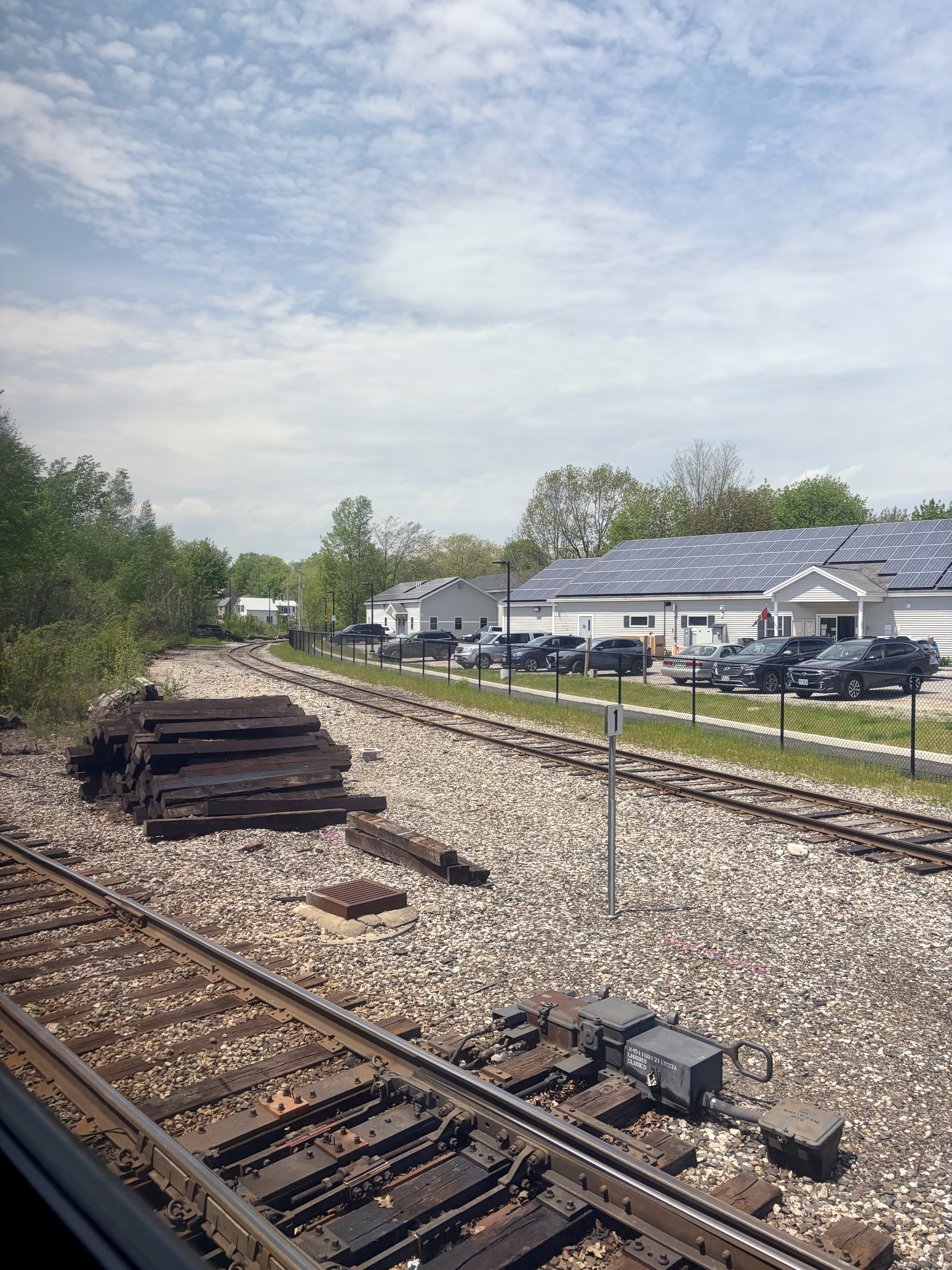
The Lewiston Branch beginning just west of Brunswick station

- Milepost 0: Brunswick on the Maine Central Lower Road
- Milepost 4.6: Pejepscot Mills
- Milepost 8: Lisbon Falls
- Milepost 11.7: Lisbon
- Milepost 14.8: Crowley's Junction with the Maine Central Farmington Branch
- Milepost 19.6: Lewiston Lower Station
Map of the Rumford Falls and Rangeley Lakes Railroad, later divided into the Rangeley and Livermore Falls branches

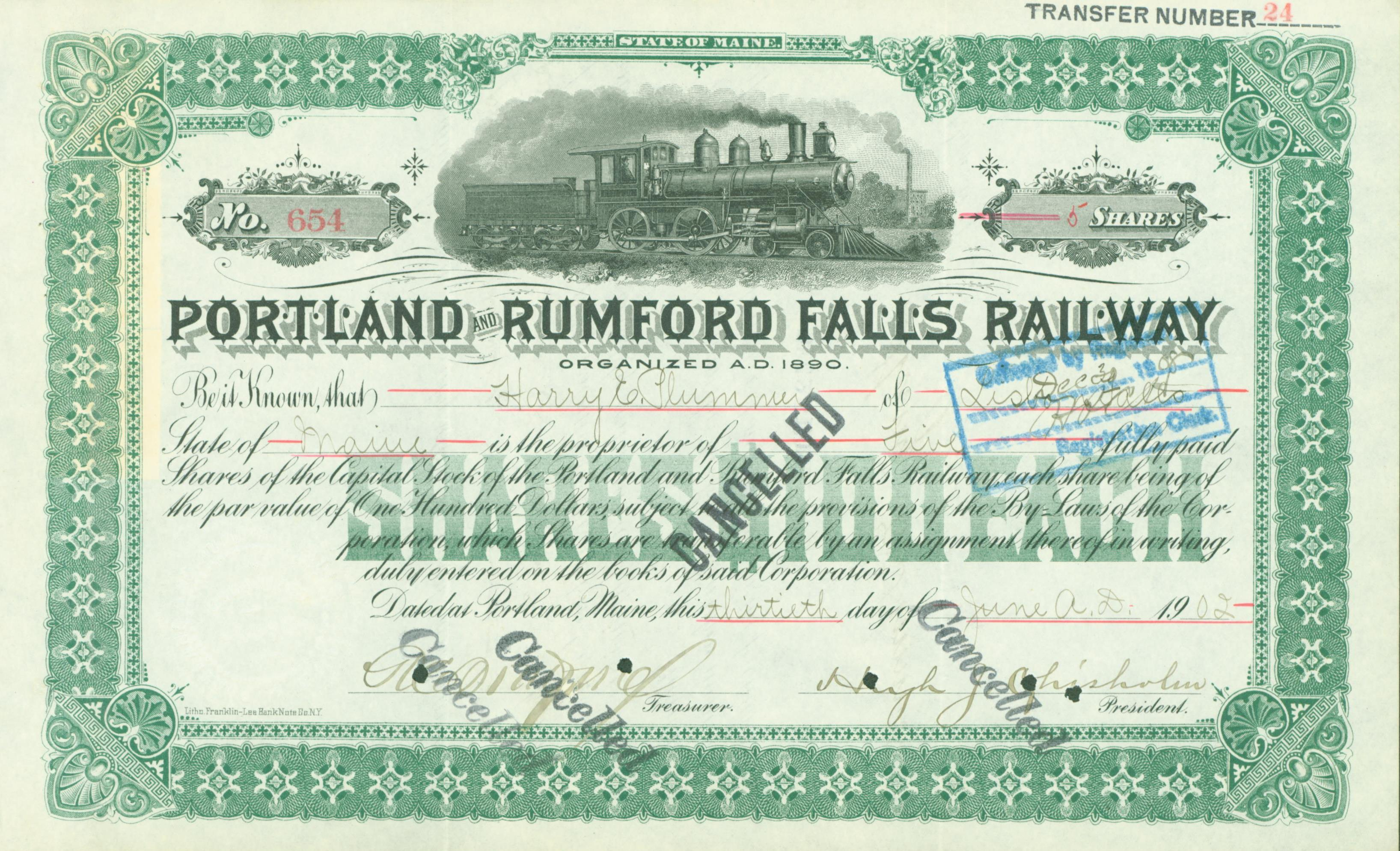
Share of the Portland and Rumford Falls Railway, issued 30 June 1902, signed by Hugh J. Chisholm

The Buckfield Branch Railroad was chartered in 1847 to build a Portland gauge railroad to Buckfield from Mechanic Falls on the Grand Trunk Railway. The railway was completed to Buckfield in 1849 and reorganized as the Portland and Oxford Central Railroad in 1857. The railway was extended to Canton in 1870 and reorganized as the Rumford Falls and Buckfield Railroad in 1874. The railway went into receivership in 1878 and was converted to standard gauge. The railway was reorganized by Hugh J. Chisholm in 1890 as the Portland and Rumford Falls Railway. The Portland and Rumford Falls Railway was extended north to Rumford Falls in 1892 and south to connect with the Maine Central Railroad at Rumford Junction near Auburn in 1893. A branch line was completed from Canton to Chisholm in 1897 and extended to a connection with the former Androscoggin Railroad at Livermore Falls in 1899. The Portland and Rumford Falls Railway chartered a subsidiary Rumford Falls and Rangeley Lakes Railroad in 1894 to access aboriginal forests north of Rumford. The Rumford Falls and Rangeley lakes reached Oquossoc in 1902. Maine Central leased the entire line from Rumford Junction to Oquossoc in 1907, and extended it to Kennebago. This line became known as the Rangeley branch when formally merged into the Maine Central in 1914. The branch from Canton to Livermore Falls was designated the Livermore Falls branch.

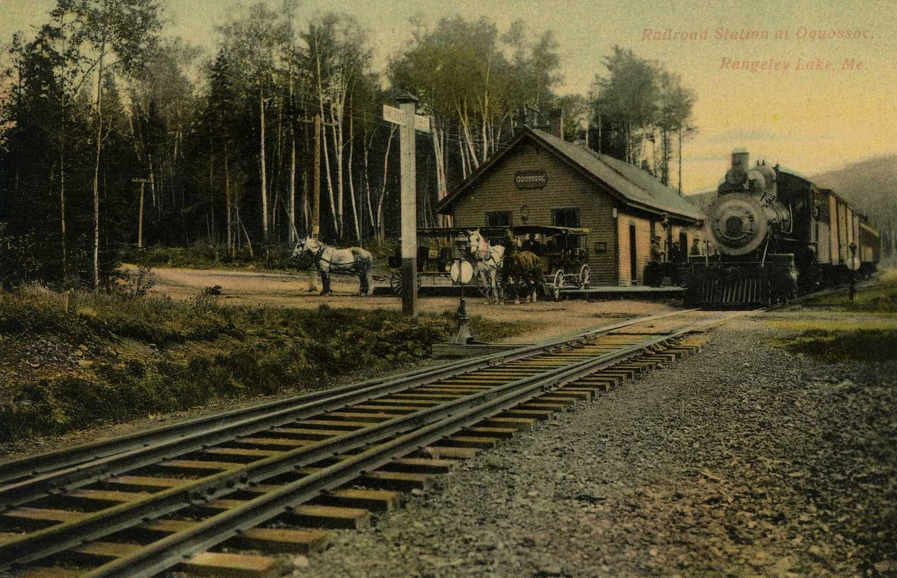
Maine Central train at Oquossoc station on the Rangeley branch about 1910.

=== Rangeley Branch ===
[with telegraoh calls]

- Milepost 0: Rumford Junction on the Maine Central Back Road [RJ]
- Milepost 4.1: Elmwood
- Milepost 5.9: Riccars (Poland Spring Sta) [SG]
- Milepost 8: Poland [ND]
- Milepost 11.6: Mechanic Falls [MF] interchange with the Grand Trunk Railway
- Milepost 16.1: West Minot [WN]
- Milepost 20.2: East Hebron [NO]
- Milepost 24.8: Buckfield [B]
- Milepost 29.5: East Sumner [F]
- Milepost 31.5: Hartford [HA]
- Milepost 36.6: Canton [CA]
- Milepost 37.3: junction with the Maine Central Livermore Falls Branch
- Milepost 38.3: Gilbertville [G]
- Milepost 43: East Peru
- Milepost 44.8: Peru
- Milepost 48.2: Dixfield [DX]
- Milepost 52.7: Rumford [RD] (Dispatch Office [KY])
- Milepost 58.5: Frye
- Milepost 62.2: Roxbury
- Milepost 66.6: Byron
- Milepost 70.5: Houghton
- Milepost 79.3: Bemis [BM]
- Milepost 86.1: South Rangeley
- Milepost 88.6: Oquossoc [DK]
- Milepost 99.4: Kennebago [KN]

=== Livermore Falls Branch ===
- Milepost 0: Canton on the Maine Central Rangeley Branch [CA]
- Milepost 6.3: Riley's [RI]
- Milepost 8.4: Jay Bridge [BY]
- Milepost 9.4 Chisholm Yard
- Milepost 11: Livermore Falls on the Maine Central Farmington Branch
