= Maine State Route 140 =

State highway in Maine, US

State Route 140

Route information
- Maintained by MaineDOT
- Length: 22.30 mi (35.89 km)

Major junctions
- South end: SR 117 in Buckfield
- SR 219 in Sumner; SR 108 in Canton
- North end: SR 4 / SR 17 in Jay

Location
- Country: United States
- State: Maine
- Counties: Oxford, Franklin

Highway system
- Maine State Highway System; Interstate; US; State; Auto trails; Lettered highways
| ← SR 139 | → SR 141 |

State Route 140 (SR 140) is part of Maine's system of numbered state highways, located in Oxford and Franklin counties. The southern terminus of the route is in Buckfield, at the intersection with SR 117. The northern terminus of the route is in Jay, at the intersections with SR 4 and SR 17. SR 140 is 22.3 miles (35.9 km) long.

== Junction list ==
| County | Location | mi | km | Destinations | Notes |
|---|---|---|---|---|---|
| Oxford | Buckfield | 0.00 | 0.00 | SR 117 (Depot Street / Turner Street) / Loring Hill Road – Turner, South Paris | |
| Oxford | Sumner | 5.17 | 8.32 | SR 219 west (Main Street) – West Paris | Southern end of SR 219 concurrency |
| Oxford | Hartford | 6.99 | 11.25 | SR 219 east (Bear Pond Road) – North Turner | Northern end of SR 219 concurrency |
| Oxford | Canton | 13.21 | 21.26 | SR 108 (Pleasant Street / Turner Street) – Rumford, Turner | |
| Franklin | Jay | 22.30 | 35.89 | SR 4 / SR 17 – Farmington, Livermore Falls | |
1.000 mi = 1.609 km; 1.000 km = 0.621 mi: Concurrency terminus
