= Canton, Maine =

Town in Maine, United States

- Town
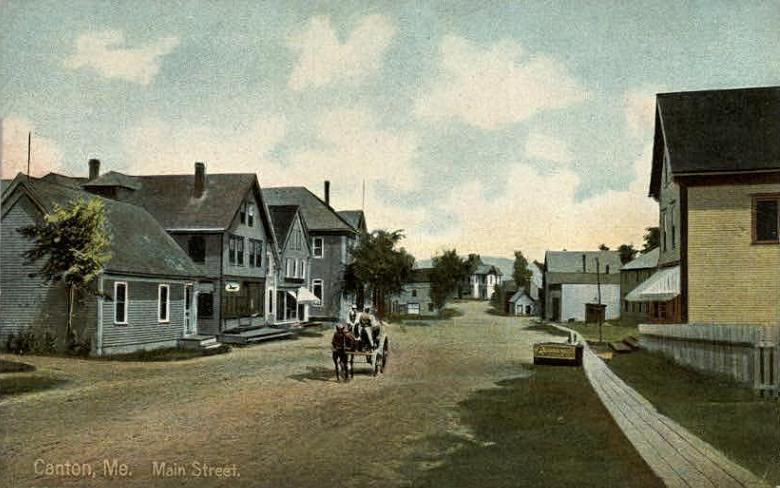
- Main Street in 1909

- Location within Maine Location within the United States
- Coordinates: 44°30′02″N 70°16′50″W
- Country: United States
- State: Maine
- County: Oxford
- Incorporated: 1821

Area
  - Total: 30.50 sq mi (78.99 km^{2})
  - Land: 29.12 sq mi (75.42 km^{2})
  - Water: 1.38 sq mi (3.57 km^{2})
- Elevation: 407 ft (124 m)

Population (2020)
  - Total: 1,125
  - Density: 39/sq mi (14.9/km^{2})
- Time zone: UTC-5 (Eastern (EST))
  - Summer (DST): UTC-4 (EDT)
- ZIP code: 04221
- Area code: 207
- FIPS code: 23-10005
- GNIS feature ID: 582386
- Website: www.cantonme.com

Canton is a town in Oxford County, Maine, United States. Canton is included in the Lewiston-Auburn, Maine metropolitan New England City and Town Area. The population was 1,125 at the 2020 census. Located beside Lake Anasagunticook, Canton is a summer recreational area.

== History ==
Canton Point was the site of Rockemeka, village of the Anasagunticook (or Androscoggin) Abenaki Indians. It is said the tribe had 500 acres (2.0 km^{2}) cleared to raise corn. In 1698 a French Jesuit mission was established, which they called Naurakamig. By 1757 the tribe population was devastated by smallpox.

The land became part of a grant the Massachusetts General Court awarded to Captain Joseph Phipps and 63 other soldiers for their services during the French and Indian War. Called Phipps-Canada, it was incorporated in 1795 as Jay in honor of John Jay, the first chief justice of the U. S. Supreme Court. On February 5, 1821, Canton was set off from Jay and incorporated, named after Canton, Massachusetts.

Settlement began in the early 1790s when William Livermore, William French, Joseph Coolidge, and Alexander Shepherd arrived. Others followed, principally from Massachusetts. The surface of the town is uneven in the outskirts, but smooth and level at Canton Point, where the soil was considered unsurpassed in the state for agriculture. The outlet of Lake Anasagunticook provided water power for industry. Gustavus Hayford settled here in 1814. In addition to a log cabin, he built a sawmill and gristmill. First called Hayford Mills, it was renamed Canton Mills, and then Canton. In the 19th century, it had a machine shop to manufacture farm implements, a tinware factory, and an iron foundry. It remains the business center. The Rumford Branch of the Maine Central Railroad passed through the town in the late 1850s, carrying freight and also tourists. The community developed as a resort area for camping.

In December 2005 the town began a project to relocate the town center and about 60 homes on the floodplains surrounding the Androscoggin River due to frequent spring flooding. Proposals have been floated to replace the vacated lots with parkland or nature trails.

== Geography ==
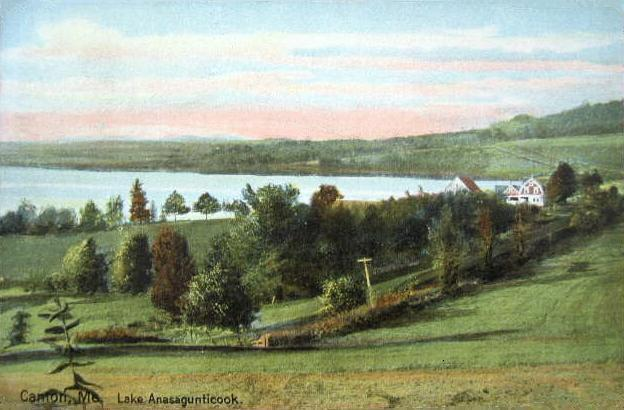
Lake Anasagunticook in 1911

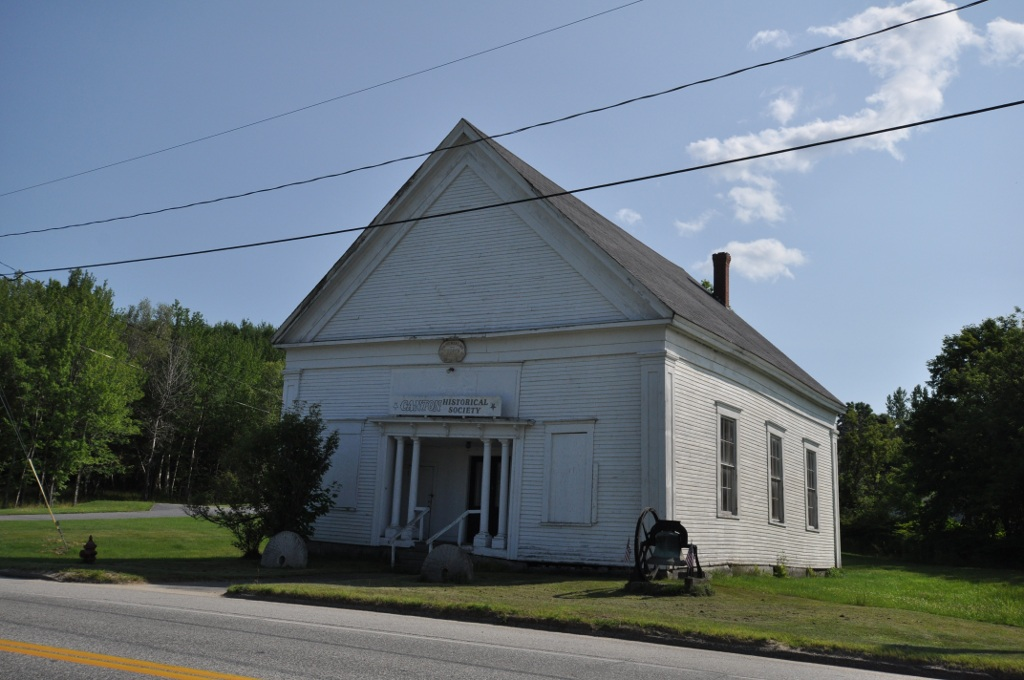
Canton Historical Society

According to the United States Census Bureau, the town has an area of 30.50 square miles (78.99 km^{2}), of which 29.12 square miles (75.42 km^{2}) is land and 1.38 square miles (3.57 km^{2}) is water. Situated beside Lake Anasagunticook, Canton is drained by Whitney Brook and the Androscoggin River.

The town is served by state routes 108 and 140. It borders the towns of Jay to the northeast, Hartford to the south, Peru to the west, and Dixfield to the northwest.

== Demographics ==
Historical population
| Census | Pop. | Note | %± |
|---|---|---|---|
| 1830 | 746 | | — |
| 1840 | 919 | | 23.2% |
| 1850 | 926 | | 0.8% |
| 1860 | 1,025 | | 10.7% |
| 1870 | 984 | | −4.0% |
| 1880 | 1,029 | | 4.6% |
| 1890 | 1,303 | | 26.6% |
| 1900 | 946 | | −27.4% |
| 1910 | 1,013 | | 7.1% |
| 1920 | 750 | | −26.0% |
| 1930 | 767 | | 2.3% |
| 1940 | 706 | | −8.0% |
| 1950 | 746 | | 5.7% |
| 1960 | 728 | | −2.4% |
| 1970 | 742 | | 1.9% |
| 1980 | 831 | | 12.0% |
| 1990 | 951 | | 14.4% |
| 2000 | 1,121 | | 17.9% |
| 2010 | 990 | | −11.7% |
| 2020 | 1,125 | | 13.6% |
U.S. Decennial Census

=== 2010 census ===
As of the census of 2010, there were 990 people, 410 households, and 239 families living in the town. The population density was 34.0 inhabitants per square mile (13.1/km^{2}). There were 473 housing units at an average density of 16.2 per square mile (6.3/km^{2}). The racial makeup of the town was 97.3% White, 0.2% African American, 0.2% Native American, 0.2% Asian, 0.2% from other races, and 1.9% from two or more races. Hispanic or Latino of any race were 1.0% of the population.

There were 410 households, of which 22.2% had children under the age of 18 living with them, 44.1% were married couples living together, 8.5% had a female householder with no husband present, 5.6% had a male householder with no wife present, and 41.7% were non-families. 27.8% of all households were made up of individuals, and 9.2% had someone living alone who was 65 years of age or older. The average household size was 2.30 and the average family size was 2.83.

The median age in the town was 48 years. 17.2% of residents were under the age of 18; 7.1% were between the ages of 18 and 24; 20.2% were from 25 to 44; 33.7% were from 45 to 64; and 21.8% were 65 years of age or older. The gender makeup of the town was 47.9% male and 52.1% female.

=== 2000 census ===
As of the census of 2000, there were 1,121 people, 400 households, and 273 families living in the town. The population density was 38.7 inhabitants per square mile (14.9/km^{2}). There were 476 housing units at an average density of 16.4 per square mile (6.3/km^{2}). The racial makeup of the town was 99.11% White, 0.09% African American, 0.18% Native American, 0.54% Asian, and 0.09% from two or more races. Hispanic or Latino of any race were 0.80% of the population.

There were 400 households, out of which 33.3% had children under the age of 18 living with them, 52.0% were married couples living together, 12.0% had a female householder with no husband present, and 31.8% were non-families. 25.0% of all households were made up of individuals, and 10.5% had someone living alone who was 65 years of age or older. The average household size was 2.54 and the average family size was 3.06.

In the town, the population was spread out, with 23.9% under the age of 18, 5.5% from 18 to 24, 30.3% from 25 to 44, 21.6% from 45 to 64, and 18.6% who were 65 years of age or older. The median age was 40 years. For every 100 females, there were 92.6 males. For every 100 females age 18 and over, there were 97.5 males.

The median income for a household in the town was $32,625, and the median income for a family was $40,469. Males had a median income of $31,607 versus $21,094 for females. The per capita income for the town was $14,065. About 14.0% of families and 19.4% of the population were below the poverty line, including 23.9% of those under age 18 and 22.5% of those age 65 or over.

== Sites of interest ==
- Canton Historical Society
- The road shore beach of Lake Anasagunticook

== Notable people ==
- Cornelius Holland, US congressman
- Scott Kolk, US actor
- Stephany Stanley, Miss Maine (1998)
- John P. Swasey, US congressman
