= Turner, Maine =

Town in Maine, United States

- Town
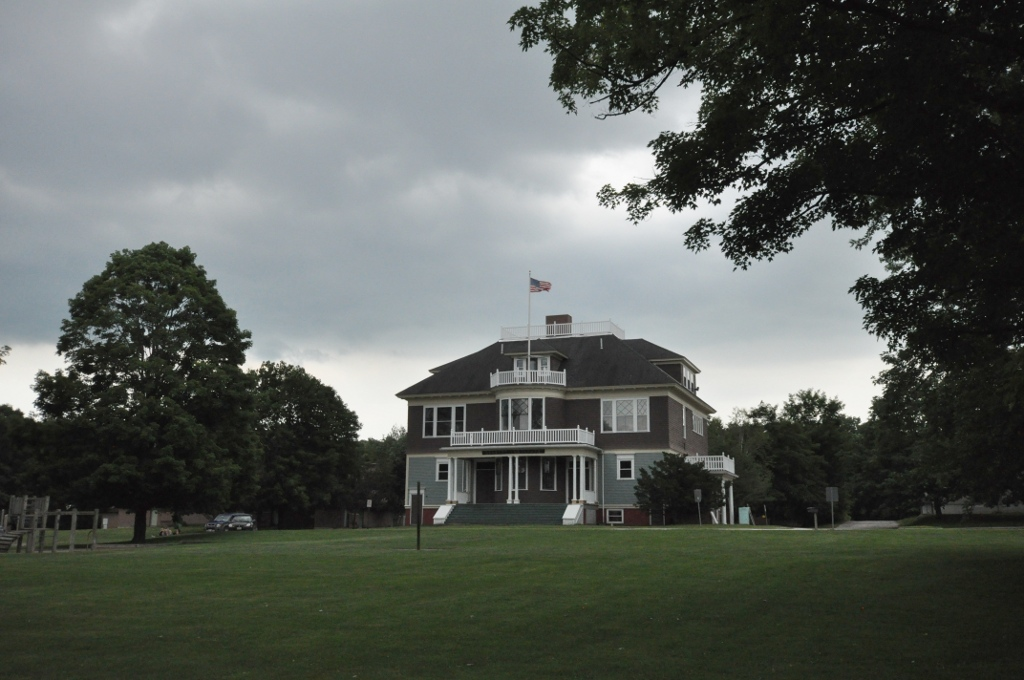
- The Leavitt Institute building, now the public library

- Seal

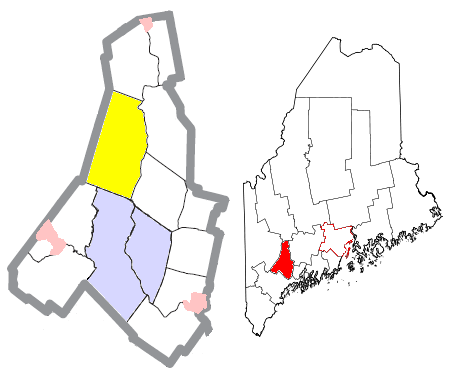
- Location of Turner (in yellow) in Androscoggin County and the state of Maine
- Coordinates: 44°15′21″N 70°15′44″W
- Country: United States
- State: Maine
- County: Androscoggin
- Incorporated: 1786
- Villages: Turner; Turner Center; Chase Mills; North Turner; South Turner

Area
  - Total: 62.72 sq mi (162.44 km^{2})
  - Land: 59.26 sq mi (153.48 km^{2})
  - Water: 3.46 sq mi (8.96 km^{2})
- Elevation: 374 ft (114 m)

Population (2020)
  - Total: 5,817
  - Density: 98/sq mi (37.9/km^{2})
- Time zone: UTC-5 (Eastern (EST))
  - Summer (DST): UTC-4 (EDT)
- ZIP codes: 04282 (Turner); 04266 (North Turner)
- Area code: 207
- FIPS code: 23-77800
- GNIS feature ID: 582770
- Website: Official website

Turner is a town in Androscoggin County, Maine, United States. The population was 5,817 at the 2020 census. The town includes the villages of Turner, Turner Center and North Turner. The town is part of the Lewiston-Auburn, Maine Metropolitan New England City and Town Area.

== History ==
First called Sylvester-Canada, the township was granted by the Massachusetts General Court on June 20, 1768, to Major James Warren and others, survivors of Captain Joseph Sylvester's company for their services in the 1690 Battle of Quebec. It replaced a 1735 grant of the same name located at what is now Richmond, New Hampshire, but which was ruled invalid in 1741 because of prior claims from the heirs of John Mason. Reverend Charles Turner of Scituate, Massachusetts, acted as an agent for the dispossessed grantees, and would become the first minister of their new town.

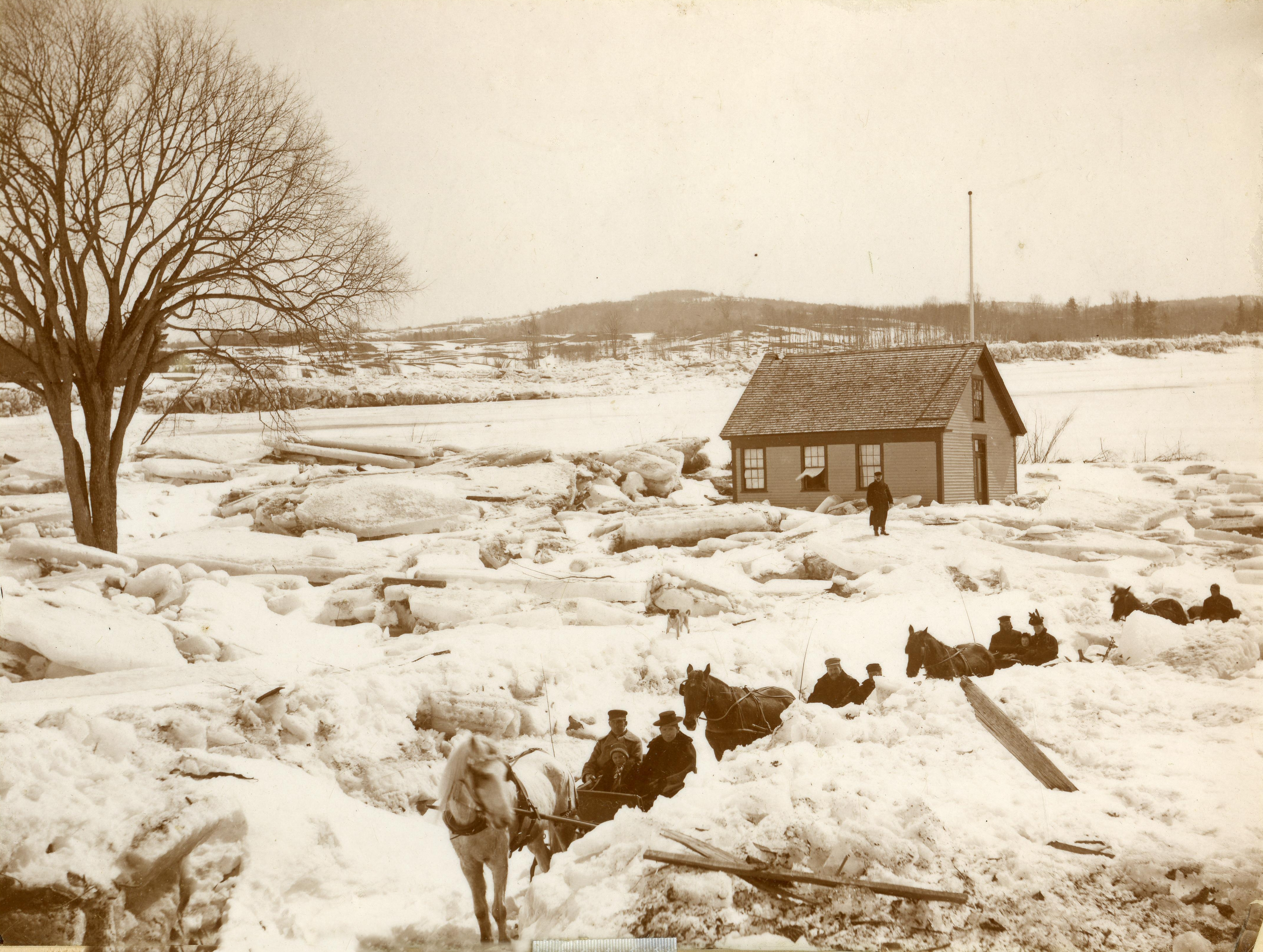
Flooding on the Androscoggin River, Turner, 1896

The community was settled in 1772 by Daniel Staples, Thomas Record, Elisha Record, Joseph Leavitt and Abner Phillips. Many of the first settlers came from Pembroke, Massachusetts, where most of the proprietors of Sylvester-Canada resided. Nearly all the early settlers came from towns which had sprung up around Plymouth, Massachusetts, including the Leavitt family, descendants of Deacon John Leavitt of Old Ship Church in Hingham, Massachusetts, and the Bradford family, descendants of Governor William Bradford of the Plymouth Colony. Following the Revolutionary War, settlement began to pick up, and by 1784 the expanding village had 30 families. Incorporated on July 7, 1786, Sylvester-Canada was renamed for Reverend Turner.

The community was primarily a farming town producing corn and apples, but with exceptional water power sites on the Nezinscot River. Here, Samuel Blake built in 1775 the first mill, both a sawmill and gristmill, although it was destroyed by the great freshet of 1785. It was rebuilt the next season. There were 5 sawmills and 3 gristmills in the community when a fire destroyed those at Turner Village in 1856. They were replaced, and by 1886, industries included not only sawmills and gristmills but a box factory, carriage factory, shoe factory, tannery, paper pulp mill, cheese factory, fulling mill and pottery factory.

== Geography ==
According to the United States Census Bureau, the town has a total area of 62.72 square miles (162.44 km^{2}), of which 59.26 square miles (153.48 km^{2}) is land and 3.46 square miles (8.96 km^{2}) is water. Turner is drained by the Nezinscot River, Martin's Stream and the Androscoggin River, which forms the town's border to the east.

The town is crossed by state routes 4, 117 and 219. It borders the towns of Hartford, Buckfield and Hebron to the west, Livermore to the north, and Minot and Auburn to the south, and Greene and Leeds to the east.

=== Climate ===
This climatic region is typified by large seasonal temperature differences, with warm to hot (and often humid) summers and cold (sometimes severely cold) winters. According to the Köppen Climate Classification system, Turner has a humid continental climate, abbreviated "Dfb" on climate maps.

Climate data for Turner, Maine (1991–2020)
Month	Jan	Feb	Mar	Apr	May	Jun	Jul	Aug	Sep	Oct	Nov	Dec	Year
Mean daily maximum °F (°C)	28.2 (−2.1)	31.3 (−0.4)	39.3 (4.1)	52.3 (11.3)	65.1 (18.4)	73.5 (23.1)	78.7 (25.9)	78.2 (25.7)	70.5 (21.4)	57.4 (14.1)	45.0 (7.2)	33.8 (1.0)	54.4 (12.5)
Daily mean °F (°C)	19.3 (−7.1)	21.6 (−5.8)	30.0 (−1.1)	42.4 (5.8)	54.2 (12.3)	63.3 (17.4)	69.0 (20.6)	67.5 (19.7)	59.7 (15.4)	48.0 (8.9)	36.7 (2.6)	25.8 (−3.4)	44.8 (7.1)
Mean daily minimum °F (°C)	10.3 (−12.1)	11.9 (−11.2)	20.8 (−6.2)	32.6 (0.3)	43.4 (6.3)	53.1 (11.7)	59.3 (15.2)	56.9 (13.8)	48.9 (9.4)	38.7 (3.7)	28.4 (−2.0)	17.8 (−7.9)	35.2 (1.8)
Average precipitation inches (mm)	3.65 (93)	2.99 (76)	3.77 (96)	4.24 (108)	3.79 (96)	4.42 (112)	3.94 (100)	3.52 (89)	3.93 (100)	5.09 (129)	4.39 (112)	4.37 (111)	48.1 (1,222)
Average snowfall inches (cm)	17.3 (44)	20.7 (53)	13.3 (34)	4.9 (12)	0.3 (0.76)	0.0 (0.0)	0.0 (0.0)	0.0 (0.0)	0.0 (0.0)	0.2 (0.51)	3.8 (9.7)	17.2 (44)	77.7 (197.97)
Source: NOAA

== Demographics ==
Historical population
Census	Pop.	Note	%±
1790	349		—
1800	722		106.9%
1810	1,129		56.4%
1820	1,726		52.9%
1830	2,220		28.6%
1840	2,479		11.7%
1850	2,536		2.3%
1860	2,682		5.8%
1870	2,380		−11.3%
1880	2,285		−4.0%
1890	2,016		−11.8%
1900	1,842		−8.6%
1910	1,708		−7.3%
1920	1,382		−19.1%
1930	1,362		−1.4%
1940	1,415		3.9%
1950	1,712		21.0%
1960	1,890		10.4%
1970	2,246		18.8%
1980	3,539		57.6%
1990	4,315		21.9%
2000	4,972		15.2%
2010	5,734		15.3%
2020	5,817		1.4%
U.S. Decennial Census

=== 2010 census ===
As of the census of 2010, there were 5,734 people, 2,193 households, and 1,641 families living in the town. The population density was 96.8 inhabitants per square mile (37.4/km^{2}). There were 2,481 housing units at an average density of 41.9 per square mile (16.2/km^{2}). The racial makeup of the town was 96.8% White, 0.5% African American, 0.3% Native American, 0.3% Asian, 0.1% Pacific Islander, 0.9% from other races, and 1.1% from two or more races. Hispanic or Latino of any race were 2.7% of the population.

There were 2,193 households, of which 34.7% had children under the age of 18 living with them, 60.0% were married couples living together, 9.5% had a female householder with no husband present, 5.3% had a male householder with no wife present, and 25.2% were non-families. 18.5% of all households were made up of individuals, and 6.9% had someone living alone who was 65 years of age or older. The average household size was 2.61 and the average family size was 2.94.

The median age in the town was 41.1 years. 24.3% of residents were under the age of 18; 7.1% were between the ages of 18 and 24; 25% were from 25 to 44; 31.9% were from 45 to 64; and 11.8% were 65 years of age or older. The gender makeup of the town was 49.9% male and 50.1% female.

=== 2000 census ===
As of the census of 2000, there were 4,972 people, 1,768 households, and 1,393 families living in the town. The population density was 83.5 inhabitants per square mile (32.2/km^{2}). There were 1,977 housing units at an average density of 33.2 per square mile (12.8/km^{2}). The racial makeup of the town was 96.78% White, 0.10% African American, 0.18% Native American, 0.28% Asian, 0.04% Pacific Islander, 1.81% from other races, and 0.80% from two or more races. Hispanic or Latino of any race were 2.78% of the population.

There were 1,768 households, out of which 41.5% had children under the age of 18 living with them, 67.0% were married couples living together, 8.3% had a female householder with no husband present, and 21.2% were non-families. 15.0% of all households were made up of individuals, and 6.3% had someone living alone who was 65 years of age or older. The average household size was 2.81 and the average family size was 3.11.

In the town, the population was spread out, with 29.3% under the age of 18, 6.5% from 18 to 24, 32.0% from 25 to 44, 23.1% from 45 to 64, and 9.1% who were 65 years of age or older. The median age was 36 years. For every 100 females, there were 97.9 males. For every 100 females age 18 and over, there were 95.7 males.

The median income for a household in the town was $46,207, and the median income for a family was $52,241. Males had a median income of $34,917 versus $24,975 for females. The per capita income for the town was $23,439. About 2.6% of families and 5.5% of the population were below the poverty line, including 5.5% of those under age 18 and 7.1% of those age 65 or over.

Voter registration

Voter Registration and Party Enrollment as of January 2015
Party	Total Voters	Percentage
Unenrolled	1,632	39.5%
Republican	1,338	32.4%
Democratic	1,027	24.9%
Green Independent	134	3.2%
Total	4,131	100%

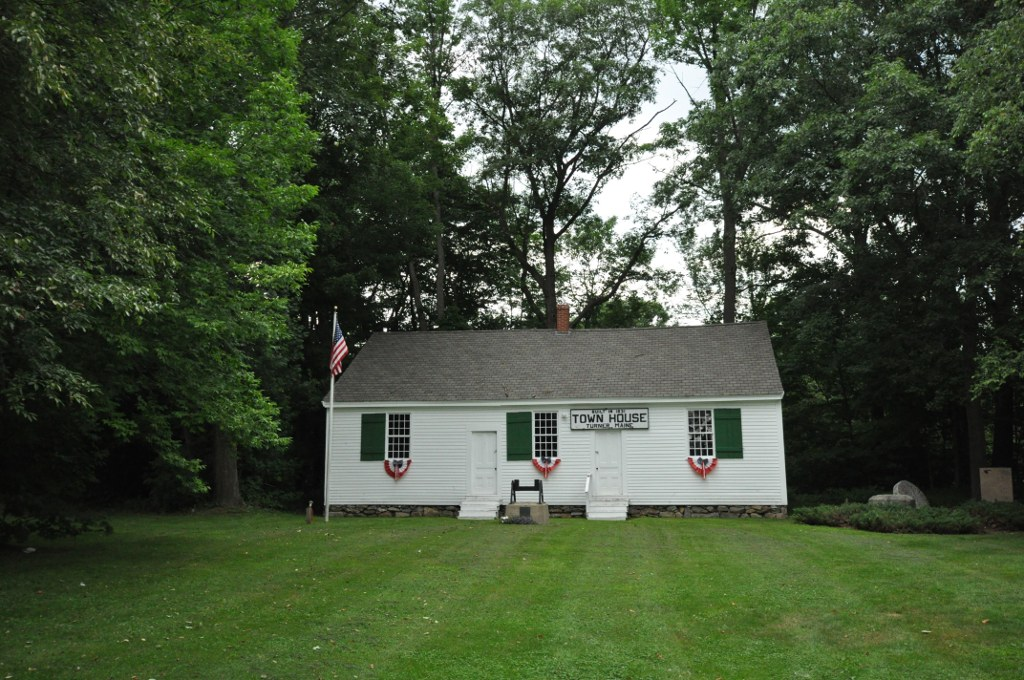
The 1831 Turner Town House, one of the oldest town halls in the state

== Notable people ==
- Solon Chase state legislator, candidate for Governor (1882)
- Alonzo Conant, Judge Auburn Municipal Court (1946–1958)
- Eugene Hale, US senator
- James Henry Howe, federal judge
- Samuel Merrill, Governor of Iowa 1868 to 1872
- Joshua Morris, Maine state legislator
- Sewall A. Phillips, Wisconsin state legislator
- Job Prince, President of the Maine Senate
- Mike Rowe, racing driver
- Alexander B. Whitman, Wisconsin state legislator
- Royal Emerson Whitman, Army officer who served in the Civil War, Reconstruction and the Indian wars
- Ray LaMontagne, singer-songwriter

== Education ==
Leavitt Area High School
