= Gilbertville =

Gilbertville may refer to:

== Canada ==
- Gilbertville, Ontario, located in Norfolk County

== United States ==
- Gilbertville, Iowa, a city in Black Hawk County
- Gilbertville, Maine, in Oxford County
- Gilbertville, Massachusetts, a village in the town of Hardwick, Worcester County
