= Turner Town House =

- U.S. National Register of Historic Places
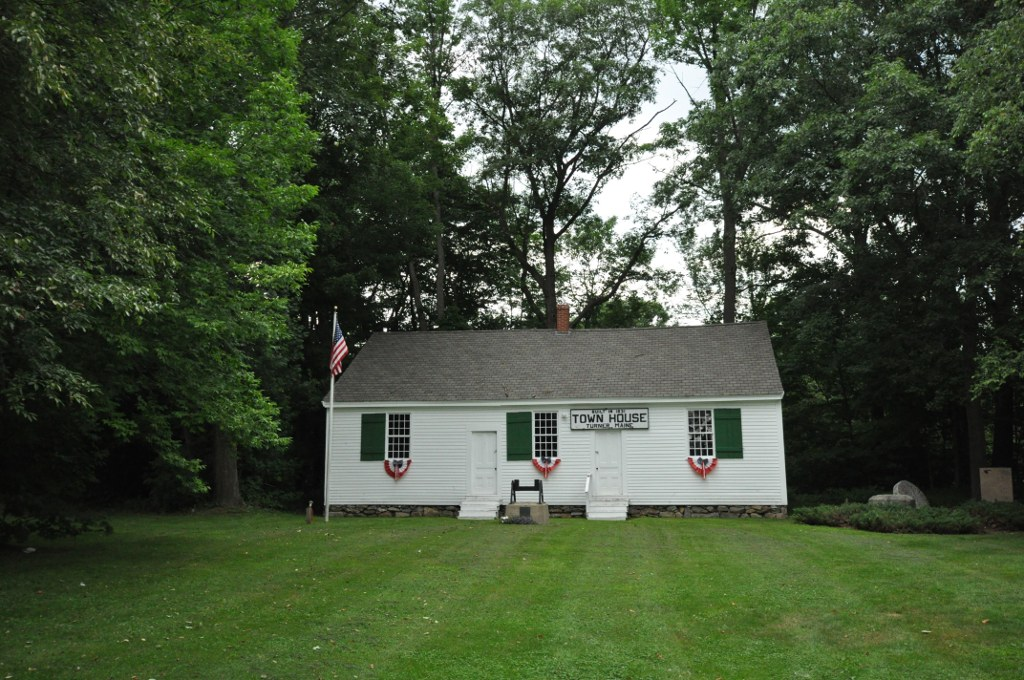

- Location within Maine Location within the United States
- Location: SR 117, Turner, Maine
- Coordinates: 44°16′18″N 70°13′30″W
- Built: 1831
- NRHP reference No.: 79000129
- Added to NRHP: July 9, 1979

The Turner Town House is an historic town hall on Maine State Route 117 in Turner, Maine. Built in 1831, it is one of the oldest buildings of its type in the state. It was listed on the National Register of Historic Places in 1979.

== Description and history ==
The Turner Town House is located in the village of Turner Center, on the north side of SR 117 just west of the First Universalist Church. It is set back from the road, on the south bank of the Nezinscot River. It is a small single-story wood frame structure, with a gabled roof, clapboard siding, and fieldstone foundation. The main facade faces south, and is five bays wide. The bays are arranged symmetrical but with irregular spacing, with three sash windows flanking two virtually identical entrances. Each window has a single large shutter mounted to its left. The exterior is otherwise devoid of significant stylisting elements. The interior consists of a single large chamber, whose floor is sloped in a V shape from the front and back toward the center, where the town officials sat during town meetings. This feature is believed to be unique among Maine's town houses.

The town of Turner was incorporated in 1787, and its earliest town meetings were held in a local church. From 1822 to 1830 meetings were held in a local school, at which time the town engaged in a series of acrimonious meetings concerning the location of a dedicated town house. The dispute was centered over issues of the town's growth, which had begun in the eastern part of the town, but had in recent years developed more rapidly to the west. The town house was built in 1830 at a site nearer the geographic center, but was surreptitiously disassembled and relocated three times by competing groups within the town, before being fixed in place at this location.

== See also ==
- National Register of Historic Places listings in Androscoggin County, Maine
