= North Turner, Maine =

- Village
- Location within Maine
- Coordinates: 44°20′35″N 70°15′23″W
- Country: United States
- State: Maine
- County: Androscoggin
- Elevation: 387 ft (118 m)
- Time zone: UTC-5 (Eastern (EST))
  - Summer (DST): UTC-4 (EDT)
- ZIP code: 04266
- Area code: 207
- GNIS feature ID: 572415

North Turner is an unincorporated village in the town of Turner, Androscoggin County, Maine, United States. It is included in both the Lewiston-Auburn, Maine Metropolitan Statistical Area and the Lewiston-Auburn, Maine Metropolitan New England City and Town Area. The community is located at the intersection of Maine State Route 4 and Maine State Route 219, 17 miles (27 km) north of Auburn. North Turner has a post office with ZIP code 04266.
