= Leeds, Maine =

Town in Maine, United States

- Town
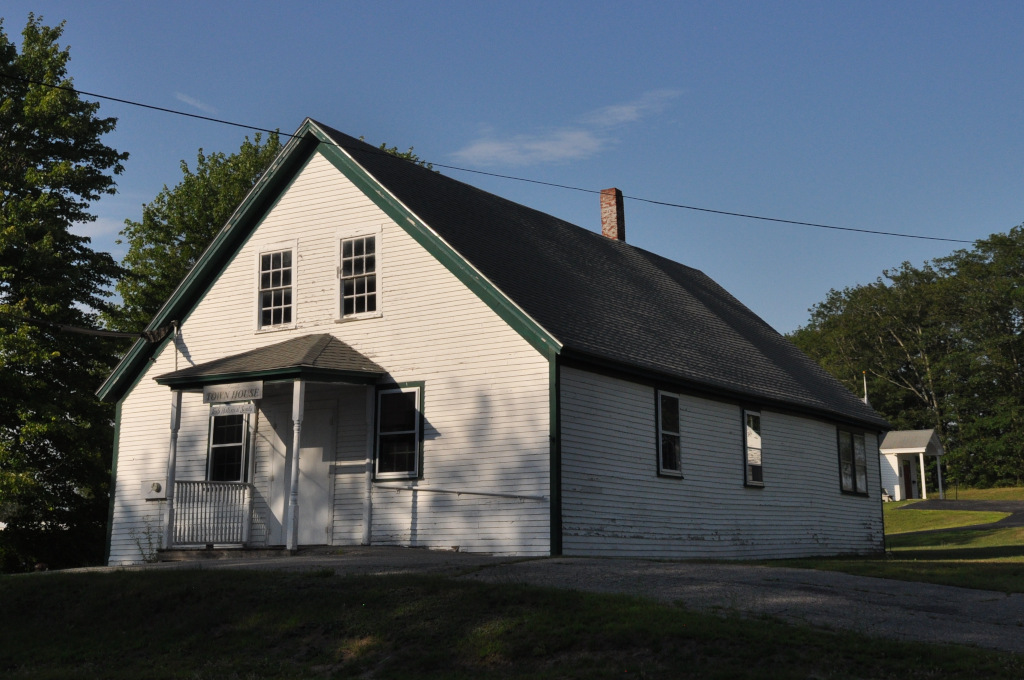
- The old Leeds town house

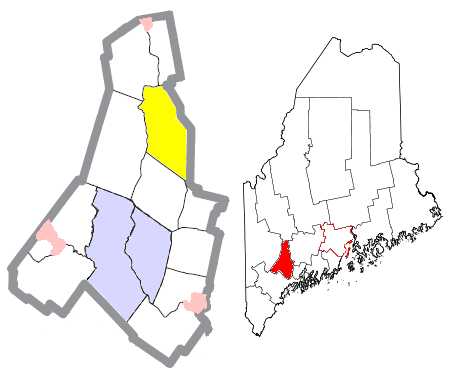
- Location of Leeds (in yellow) in Androscoggin County and the state of Maine
- Coordinates: 44°16′02″N 70°07′12″W
- Country: United States
- State: Maine
- County: Androscoggin
- Incorporated: February 16, 1801
- Villages: Leeds; Curtis Corner; North Leeds; South Leeds; West Leeds

Area
  - Total: 43.41 sq mi (112.43 km^{2})
  - Land: 40.05 sq mi (103.73 km^{2})
  - Water: 3.36 sq mi (8.70 km^{2})
- Elevation: 308 ft (94 m)

Population (2020)
  - Total: 2,262
  - Density: 56/sq mi (21.8/km^{2})
- Time zone: UTC-5 (Eastern (EST))
  - Summer (DST): UTC-4 (EDT)
- ZIP code: 04263
- Area code: 207
- FIPS code: 23-38565
- GNIS feature ID: 582552
- Website: townofleeds.com

Leeds is a town in Androscoggin County, Maine, United States. The population was 2,262 at the 2020 census. It is included in both the Lewiston-Auburn, Maine Metropolitan Statistical Area and the Lewiston-Auburn, Maine Metropolitan New England City and Town Area.

== History ==
Leeds was named after Leeds, England, the ancestral home of the town's first settlers, Thomas and Rogers Stinchfield. Their father, John, came from Leeds, England and was among the first settlers of New Gloucester, Maine.

== Geography ==
According to the United States Census Bureau, the town has a total area of 43.41 square miles (112.43 km^{2}), of which 40.05 square miles (103.73 km^{2}) is land and 3.36 square miles (8.70 km^{2}) is water.

== Demographics ==
Historical population
Census	Pop.	Note	%±
1800	607		—
1810	1,273		109.7%
1820	1,534		20.5%
1830	1,685		9.8%
1840	1,736		3.0%
1850	1,652		−4.8%
1860	1,390		−15.9%
1870	1,288		−7.3%
1880	1,194		−7.3%
1890	999		−16.3%
1900	1,065		6.6%
1910	990		−7.0%
1920	840		−15.2%
1930	729		−13.2%
1940	801		9.9%
1950	797		−0.5%
1960	807		1.3%
1970	1,031		27.8%
1980	1,463		41.9%
1990	1,669		14.1%
2000	2,001		19.9%
2010	2,326		16.2%
2020	2,262		−2.8%
U.S. Decennial Census

As of 2000 the median income for a household in the town was $37,993, and the median income for a family was $42,557. Males had a median income of $30,245 versus $24,250 for females. The per capita income for the town was $15,602. About 5.9% of families and 9.8% of the population were below the poverty line, including 9.7% of those under age 18 and 9.7% of those age 65 or over.

=== 2010 census ===
As of the census of 2010, there were 2,326 people, 895 households, and 655 families residing in the town. The population density was 58.1 inhabitants per square mile (22.4/km^{2}). There were 1,018 housing units at an average density of 25.4 units per square mile (9.8 units/km^{2}). The racial makeup of the town was 97.5% White, 0.3% African American, 0.5% Native American, 0.2% Asian, 0.3% from other races, and 1.2% from two or more races. Hispanic or Latino of any race were 1.7% of the population.

There were 895 households, of which 32.6% had children under the age of 18 living with them, 58.7% were married couples living together, 8.3% had a female householder with no husband present, 6.3% had a male householder with no wife present, and 26.8% were non-families. 20.8% of all households were made up of individuals, and 7.9% had someone living alone who was 65 years of age or older. The average household size was 2.60 and the average family size was 2.96.

The median age in the town was 41.3 years. 22.8% of residents were under the age of 18; 7.7% were between the ages of 18 and 24; 25.4% were from 25 to 44; 33.1% were from 45 to 64; and 10.9% were 65 years of age or older. The gender makeup of the town was 51.3% male and 48.7% female.

Voter registration

Voter Registration and Party Enrollment as of January 2015
Party	Total Voters	Percentage
Unenrolled	711	40.9%
Democratic	469	27.0%
Republican	464	26.7%
Green Independent	95	5.4%
Total	1,739	100%

== Notable people ==
- Kenneth M. Curtis (born 1931), ambassador to Canada, president of Maine Maritime Academy, 68th governor of Maine
- Jared Golden (born 1982), Marine veteran and U.S. representative for Maine
- Oliver O. Howard (1830–1909), Civil War era general, headed the Freedmen's Bureau, and Howard University
- Daniel Stanchfield (1820–1908), explorer, businessman, and member of the Minnesota Territorial House of Representatives
- Samuel B. Stanchfield (1837–1919), member of the Wisconsin State Senate and the Wisconsin State Assembly

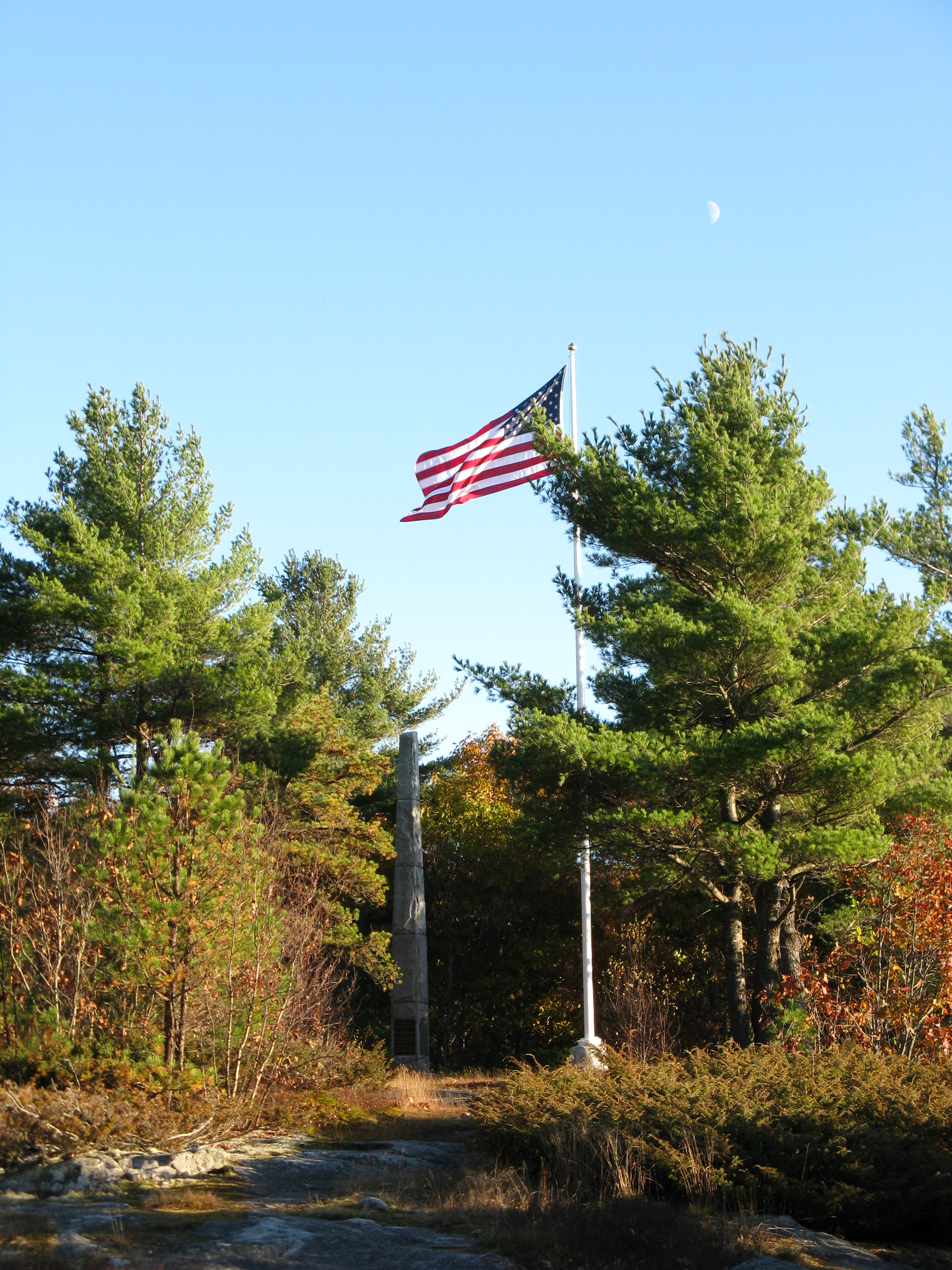
Monument Hill

== Tourism ==
- Camp Tekakwitha is the only entirely French-speaking summer camp in United States. The property spreads over 11,000,000 square feet (1,000,000 m^{2}) of timber land on the shores of Androscoggin Lake
- Monument Hill, Leeds (elevation 669 ft.). A short, 3/4 mile, hike from base (North Rd.) to a wooded summit – 200 feet' elevation gain. Located at the summit, the obelisk is a "Monument to Peace" after the Civil War. Generals Oliver Otis Howard and Charles Henry Howard placed the obelisk in 1895 "on the great hill" where they as children had played with their brother, Reverend Roland Bailey Howard, Secretary of the American Peace Society. It was Rev. Howard's desire, unfulfilled at the time of his death in 1892, to place a monument there to honor the Peace that came at the end of the Civil War.
- Leeds borders the Androscoggin River and Androscoggin Lake. Running between these two bodies of water, through Leeds, is the Dead River.
