= Daniel Stanchfield =

American businessman, explorer, and politician

Member of the Minnesota Territorial House of Representatives
- In office 1855

Personal details
- Born: June 8, 1820; Leeds, Maine, U.S.
- Died: May 23, 1908 (aged 87); Fort Collins, Colorado, U.S.
- Occupation: Businessman, explorer, politician
- Known for: Minnesota Territorial House of Representatives, exploration of the Rum River, namesake of Stanchfield Township

Daniel Stanchfield (June 8, 1820 – May 23, 1908) was an American businessman, explorer, and politician.

Stanchfield was born in Leeds, Maine. In 1847, Stanchfield settled in Wisconsin Territory, in the community of Saint Anthony which is now Minneapolis, Minnesota. Stanchfield explored the Rum River in Minnesota Territory. He was involved in the logging business and mercantile business. Stanchfield served in the Minnesota Territorial House of Representatives in 1855. In 1861, he moved to Iowa and then moved back to Minneapolis in 1889. Stanchfield died in Fort Collins, Colorado. Stanchfield Township in Isanti County, Minnesota was named after Stanchfield.
