= East Branch Nezinscot River =

Location
- Country: United States

Physical characteristics
- Source
  - location: Maine
- Mouth
  - location: Nezinscot River
  - elevation: 305 feet (90 m)

The East Branch Nezinscot River is a 19.4-mile-long (31.2 km) river in Maine. It flows from its source (44°26′22″N 70°27′16″W) on Black Mountain in Peru to its confluence with the West Branch in Buckfield. The resulting river, the Nezinscot, continues east to the Androscoggin River, which flows to the Kennebec River near its mouth at the Atlantic Ocean.

== See also ==
- List of rivers of Maine
