= Stanchfield Township, Isanti County, Minnesota =

Township in Minnesota, United States

Stanchfield Township
- Township
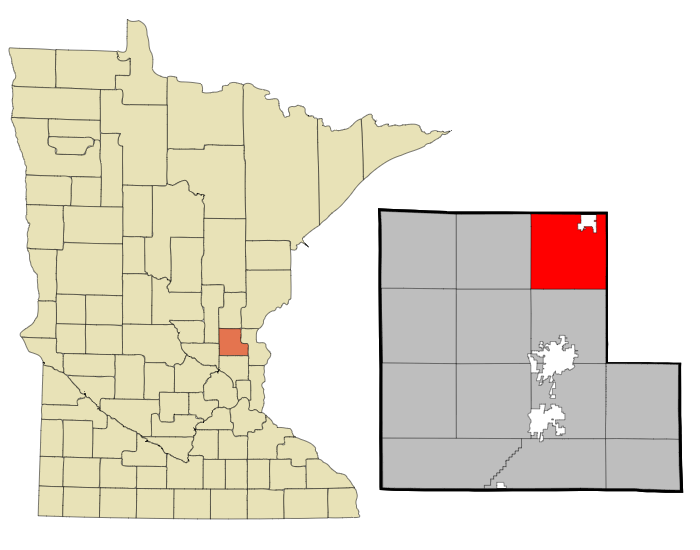
- Location of the township of Stanchfield within Isanti County, Minnesota
- Coordinates: 45°41′9″N 93°11′44″W
- Country: United States
- State: Minnesota
- County: Isanti

Area
  - Total: 34.6 sq mi (89.7 km^{2})
  - Land: 33.8 sq mi (87.6 km^{2})
  - Water: 0.81 sq mi (2.1 km^{2})
- Elevation: 938 ft (286 m)

Population (2000)
  - Total: 1,120
  - Density: 33/sq mi (12.8/km^{2})
- Time zone: UTC-6 (Central (CST))
  - Summer (DST): UTC-5 (CDT)
- ZIP code: 55080
- Area code: 320
- FIPS code: 27-62347
- GNIS feature ID: 0665692
- Website: https://stanchfield.org/

Stanchfield Township is a township in Isanti County, Minnesota, United States. The population was 1,120 at the 2000 census. It contains the census-designated place of Stanchfield.

== History ==
Stanchfield Creek was named for Daniel Stanchfield, an explorer of the area and afterward state politician.

== Geography ==
According to the United States Census Bureau, the township has a total area of 34.6 square miles (89.7 km^{2}), of which 33.8 square miles (87.5 km^{2}) is land and 0.8 square mile (2.1 km^{2}) (2.34%) is water.

Stanchfield Township is along Lower Stanchfield Branch.

== Demographics ==
Historical population
Census	Pop.	Note	%±
1880	491		—
1890	759		54.6%
1900	1,175		54.8%
1910	1,005		−14.5%
1920	1,119		11.3%
1930	955		−14.7%
1940	989		3.6%
1950	861		−12.9%
1960	811		−5.8%
1970	951		17.3%
1980	1,077		13.2%
1990	1,060		−1.6%
2000	1,120		5.7%
2010	1,209		7.9%
U.S. Decennial Census

As of the census of 2010, there were 1,209 people, 442 households, and 326 families residing in the township. The population density was 33.1 inhabitants per square mile (12.8/km^{2}). There were 479 housing units at an average density of 12.6/sq mi (4.9/km^{2}). The racial makeup of the township was 96.9% White, 0.2% African American, 0.4% Native American, 0.7% Asian, and 1.6% from two or more races. Hispanic or Latino of any race were 1.8% of the population.

There were 442 households, out of which 31.0% had children under the age of 18 living with them, 62.2% were married couples living together, 5.9% had a female householder with no husband present, and 26.2% were non-families. 20.4% of all households were made up of individuals, and 7.0% had someone living alone who was 65 years of age or older. The average household size was 2.69 and the average family size was 3.15.

In the township the population was spread out, with 27.4% under the age of 18, 5.2% from 18 to 24, 24.1% from 25 to 44, 29.5% from 45 to 64, and 13.8% who were 65 years of age or older. The median age was 39.1 years. For every 100 females, there were 108.4 males. For every 100 females age 18 and over, there were 113.6 males.

The median income for a household in the township was $66,719, and the median income for a family was $82,222. Males had a median income of $52,292 versus $39,844 for females. The per capita income for the township was $28,007. About 4.2% of families and 9.0% of the population were below the poverty line, including 9.2% of those under age 18 and 7.5% of those age 65 or over.
