= West Branch Nezinscot River =

Location
- Country: United States

Physical characteristics
- Source
  - location: Maine
- Mouth
  - location: Nezinscot River
  - elevation: 305 feet (90 m)

The West Branch Nezinscot River is an 18.7-mile-long (30.1 km) river in Maine. It flows from Shagg Pond in Woodstock (44°25′12″N 70°31′48″W) to its confluence with the East Branch in Buckfield. The resulting river, the Nezinscot, flows east to the Androscoggin River, which in turn flows southeast to the Kennebec River near its mouth at the Atlantic Ocean.

== See also ==
- List of rivers of Maine
