= Turner (CDP), Maine =

Turner, Maine
- Census-designated place
- Location within Maine Location within the United States
- Coordinates: 44°15′14″N 70°15′14″W
- Country: United States
- State: Maine
- County: Androscoggin
- Town: Turner

Area
  - Total: 1.51 sq mi (3.92 km^{2})
  - Land: 1.46 sq mi (3.77 km^{2})
  - Water: 0.058 sq mi (0.15 km^{2})
- Elevation: 338 ft (103 m)

Population (2020)
  - Total: 544
  - Density: 373.7/sq mi (144.28/km^{2})
- Time zone: UTC-5 (Eastern (EST))
  - Summer (DST): UTC-4 (EDT)
- ZIP Code: 04282
- Area code: 207
- FIPS code: 23-77765
- GNIS feature ID: 2806275

Turner is a census-designated place (CDP) and the primary village in the town of Turner, Androscoggin County, Maine, United States. It is in the center of the town, situated on the Nezinscot River, a northeast-flowing tributary of the Androscoggin River. Maine State Routes 4 and 117 cross just west of the center of the village. Route 4 (Auburn Road) leads north 17 miles (27 km) to Livermore Falls and south 11 miles (18 km) to Auburn, while Route 117 leads northwest 6 miles (10 km) to Buckfield and northeast 6 miles to Howes Corner in the northern part of the town of Turner.

Turner was first listed as a CDP prior to the 2020 census.

== Demographics ==
Historical population
Census	Pop.	Note	%±
2020	544		—
U.S. Decennial Census
