= Gilbertville, Maine =

Community in Maine, United States

Coordinates: 44°27′26″N 70°18′24″W

- Ghost town
- Interactive map of Gilbertville, Maine

Gilbertville is a community in the town of Canton in Oxford County, Maine, United States, about 30 miles (48 km) northwest of the city of Augusta.

The town originated between 1879 and 1882, with growth spurred by the construction of a sawmill and a pulp mill which had been given 10-year tax abatements by the Canton government. In 1882, Gilbertville was reported to have had a population of over 500, with a school, post office, and several boarding houses. The community was named after the Gilbert brothers, who were New Hampshire lumbermen.
