= Peru, Maine =

Town in Maine, US

- Town
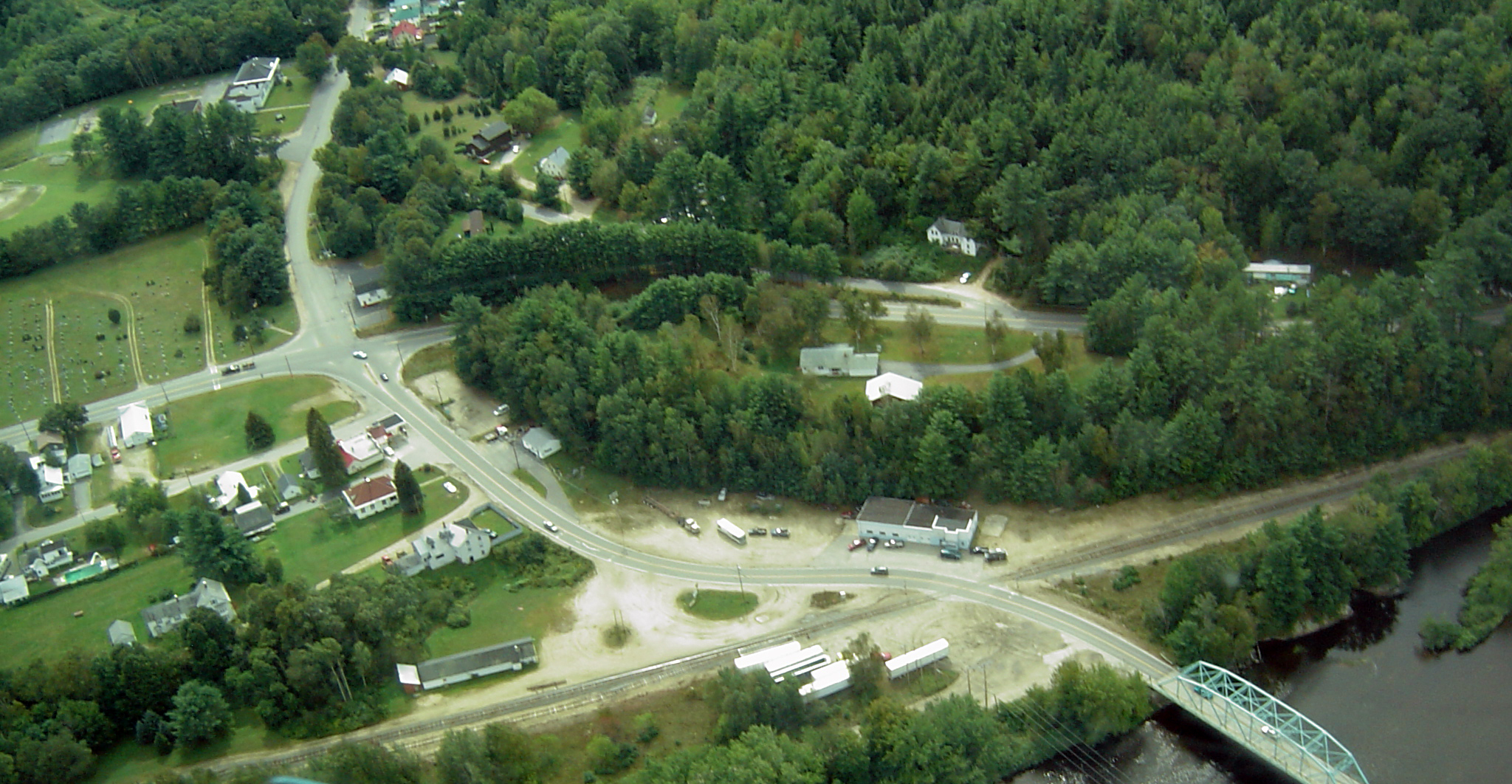
- Bird's-eye view

- Seal

- Location within Maine Location within the United States
- Coordinates: 44°29′41″N 70°26′14″W
- Country: United States
- State: Maine
- County: Oxford
- Incorporated: 1821

Area
  - Total: 47.60 sq mi (123.28 km^{2})
  - Land: 46.68 sq mi (120.90 km^{2})
  - Water: 0.92 sq mi (2.38 km^{2})
- Elevation: 968 ft (295 m)

Population (2020)
  - Total: 1,488
  - Density: 32/sq mi (12.3/km^{2})
- Time zone: UTC-5 (Eastern (EST))
  - Summer (DST): UTC-4 (EDT)
- ZIP code: 04290
- Area code: 207
- FIPS code: 23-58270
- GNIS feature ID: 582673
- Website: townofperumaine.org

Peru is a town in Oxford County, Maine, United States. Peru is included in the Lewiston-Auburn, Maine metropolitan New England City and Town Area. The population was 1,488 at the 2020 census.

== History ==
It was granted by the Massachusetts General Court to several residents from Falmouth, Maine. The first grantee to settle would be Merrill Knight in 1793. Organized in 1812 as Plantation Number 1 (also Thompsontown), it was incorporated on February 5, 1821, as the 240th town in Maine. Peru was named in the spirit of liberty and solidarity for Peru, the South American country which declared independence from Spain on July 28, 1821.

With dark soil free from stones, farming was an early industry. The chief crop was hay, and raising sheep became a common occupation. In addition, there were five sawmills which manufactured long and short lumber, as well as specialty products like wooden bowls. In 1870, the population was 931.

Formerly possessing an independent public school department, Peru joined Maine School Administrative District 21 in 2006. It has since moved to RSU (Regional School Unit) #10 in 2009 and then to RSU #56 in 2017 with Canton, Carthage and Dixfield.

== Geography ==
According to the United States Census Bureau, the town has a total area of 47.60 square miles (123.28 km^{2}), of which 46.68 square miles (120.90 km^{2}) is land and 0.92 square miles (2.38 km^{2}) is water. Peru is drained by the Androscoggin River. Worthley Pond, two miles long by one-half mile wide, is in the southern part of the town. The tallest mountains are Mt. Zircon (2221 ft), Black Mountain (2129 ft) and Speckled Mountain (2116 ft).

== Demographics ==
Historical population
Census	Pop.	Note	%±
1820	343		—
1830	666		94.2%
1840	1,002		50.5%
1850	1,109		10.7%
1860	1,121		1.1%
1870	931		−16.9%
1880	825		−11.4%
1890	692		−16.1%
1900	773		11.7%
1910	746		−3.5%
1920	738		−1.1%
1930	826		11.9%
1940	965		16.8%
1950	1,080		11.9%
1960	1,229		13.8%
1970	1,345		9.4%
1980	1,564		16.3%
1990	1,541		−1.5%
2000	1,515		−1.7%
2010	1,541		1.7%
2020	1,488		−3.4%
U.S. Decennial Census

=== 2020 census ===
As of the census of 2020, there were 1,488 people, 697 households, and 429 families living in the town. Peru had 907 housing units. The median age was 49.4.

The racial makeup of the town was 94.4% White, 0.5% Native American, 0.3% Asian, 0.5% from other races, and 4.0% from two or more races. Hispanic or Latino of any race were 0.9% of the population.

There were 624 households, of which 24.3% had children under the age of 18 living with them, 51.1% were married couples living together, 19.3% had a female householder with no husband present, 17.7% had a male householder with no wife present, and 33.7% were non-families. 27.1% of all households were made up of individuals, and 12.6% had someone living alone who was 65 years of age or older. The average household size was 2.44 and the average family size was 3.02.

=== 2010 census ===
As of the census of 2010, there were 1,541 people, 629 households, and 446 families living in the town. The population density was 33.0 inhabitants per square mile (12.7/km^{2}). There were 909 housing units at an average density of 19.5 per square mile (7.5/km^{2}). The racial makeup of the town was 97.6% White, 0.6% Native American, 0.3% Asian, 0.3% from other races, and 1.1% from two or more races. Hispanic or Latino of any race were 0.3% of the population.

There were 629 households, of which 28.1% had children under the age of 18 living with them, 57.2% were married couples living together, 7.8% had a female householder with no husband present, 5.9% had a male householder with no wife present, and 29.1% were non-families. 22.3% of all households were made up of individuals, and 12% had someone living alone who was 65 years of age or older. The average household size was 2.45 and the average family size was 2.82.

The median age in the town was 47 years. 18.9% of residents were under the age of 18; 8.3% were between the ages of 18 and 24; 20.4% were from 25 to 44; 36.3% were from 45 to 64; and 16.1% were 65 years of age or older. The gender makeup of the town was 49.5% male and 50.5% female.

=== 2000 census ===
As of the census of 2000, there were 1,515 people, 585 households, and 436 families living in the town. The population density was 32.3 inhabitants per square mile (12.5/km^{2}). There were 849 housing units at an average density of 18.1 per square mile (7.0/km^{2}). The racial makeup of the town was 99.27% White, 0.33% Native American, 0.13% Asian, and 0.26% from two or more races. Hispanic or Latino of any race were 0.40% of the population.

There were 585 households, out of which 35.0% had children under the age of 18 living with them, 63.8% were married couples living together, 5.6% had a female householder with no husband present, and 25.3% were non-families. 19.8% of all households were made up of individuals, and 7.9% had someone living alone who was 65 years of age or older. The average household size was 2.59 and the average family size was 2.98.

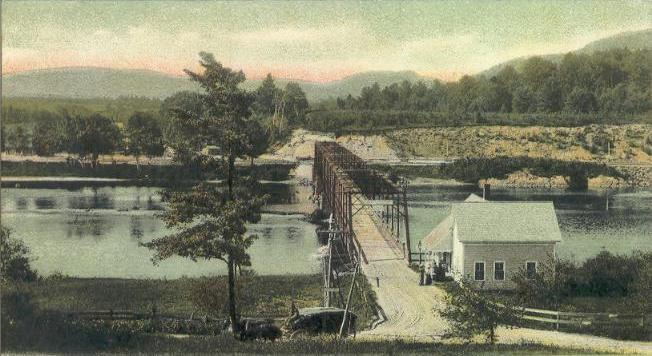
West Peru from Dixfield in 1906

In the town, the population was spread out, with 26.7% under the age of 18, 5.8% from 18 to 24, 28.2% from 25 to 44, 24.2% from 45 to 64, and 15.1% who were 65 years of age or older. The median age was 40 years. For every 100 females, there were 99.9 males. For every 100 females age 18 and over, there were 99.8 males.

The median income for a household in the town was $38,083, and the median income for a family was $43,047. Males had a median income of $32,171 versus $23,214 for females. The per capita income for the town was $16,383. About 3.4% of families and 6.0% of the population were below the poverty line, including 3.8% of those under age 18 and 7.0% of those age 65 or over.

== Notable people ==
- Clinton Briggs Ripley, architect
- Samuel Thurston, first congressional delegate from Oregon Territory
