= Livermore Falls (CDP), Maine =

Livermore Falls, Maine
- Census-designated place
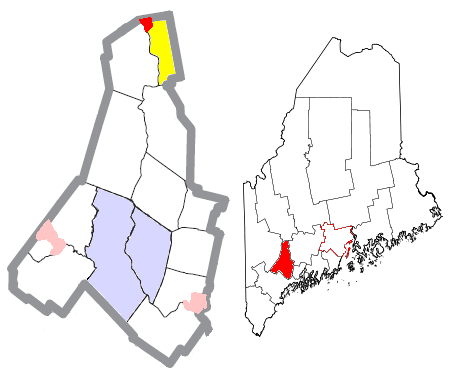
- Location of Livermore Falls (in red) in Androscoggin County and the state of Maine
- Coordinates: 44°28′20″N 70°10′51″W
- Country: United States
- State: Maine
- County: Androscoggin
- Town: Livermore Falls

Area
  - Total: 1.31 sq mi (3.39 km^{2})
  - Land: 1.20 sq mi (3.11 km^{2})
  - Water: 0.11 sq mi (0.28 km^{2})
- Elevation: 489 ft (149 m)

Population (2020)
  - Total: 1,540
  - Density: 1,280.6/sq mi (494.46/km^{2})
- Time zone: UTC-5 (Eastern (EST))
  - Summer (DST): UTC-4 (EDT)
- ZIP code: 04254
- Area code: 207
- FIPS code: 23-40735
- GNIS feature ID: 2377929

Livermore Falls is a census-designated place (CDP) in the town of Livermore Falls in Androscoggin County, Maine, United States. The population of the CDP was 1,594 at the 2010 census, out of a population of 3,187 within the full town.

== Geography ==
The Livermore Falls CDP is located in the northwestern corner of the town of Livermore Falls, along the Androscoggin River. It is bordered by the community of Chisholm directly to the north in the town of Jay.

According to the United States Census Bureau, the CDP has a total area of 1.3 square miles (3.4 km^{2}), of which 1.2 square miles (3.1 km^{2}) is land and 0.12 square miles (0.3 km^{2}), or 7.91%, is water.

== Demographics ==
Historical population
Census	Pop.	Note	%±
2020	1,540		—
U.S. Decennial Census

As of the census of 2000, there were 1,626 people, 718 households, and 409 families residing in the CDP. The population density was 1,327.1 inhabitants per square mile (512.4/km^{2}). There were 842 housing units at an average density of 687.2 per square mile (265.3/km^{2}). The racial makeup of the CDP was 97.05% White, 0.55% Black or African American, 0.43% Native American, 0.12% Asian, and 1.85% from two or more races. Hispanic or Latino of any race were 1.48% of the population.

There were 718 households, out of which 29.5% had children under the age of 18 living with them, 39.4% were married couples living together, 12.3% had a female householder with no husband present, and 43.0% were non-families. 37.2% of all households were made up of individuals, and 16.3% had someone living alone who was 65 years of age or older. The average household size was 2.26 and the average family size was 2.98.

In the CDP, the population was spread out, with 27.4% under the age of 18, 7.6% from 18 to 24, 27.9% from 25 to 44, 19.5% from 45 to 64, and 17.6% who were 65 years of age or older. The median age was 37 years. For every 100 females, there were 91.7 males. For every 100 females age 18 and over, there were 89.0 males.

The median income for a household in the CDP was $27,759, and the median income for a family was $32,350. Males had a median income of $25,667 versus $20,500 for females. The per capita income for the CDP was $14,963. About 14.9% of families and 19.4% of the population were below the poverty line, including 20.5% of those under age 18 and 13.4% of those age 65 or over.
