= Nezinscot River =

Coordinates: 44°17′20″N 70°11′0″W

Location
- Country: United States

Physical characteristics
- Source
  - location: Maine
- Mouth
  - location: Androscoggin River
  - elevation: 265 feet (80 m)

The Nezinscot River is a 15-mile-long (24 km) river in Maine, traversing the counties of Oxford and Androscoggin. It runs east from the confluence of its East Branch and West Branch in Buckfield to its mouth on the Androscoggin River in Turner.

== See also ==
- List of rivers of Maine
