= Hartford, Maine =

Town in Maine, United States

- Town
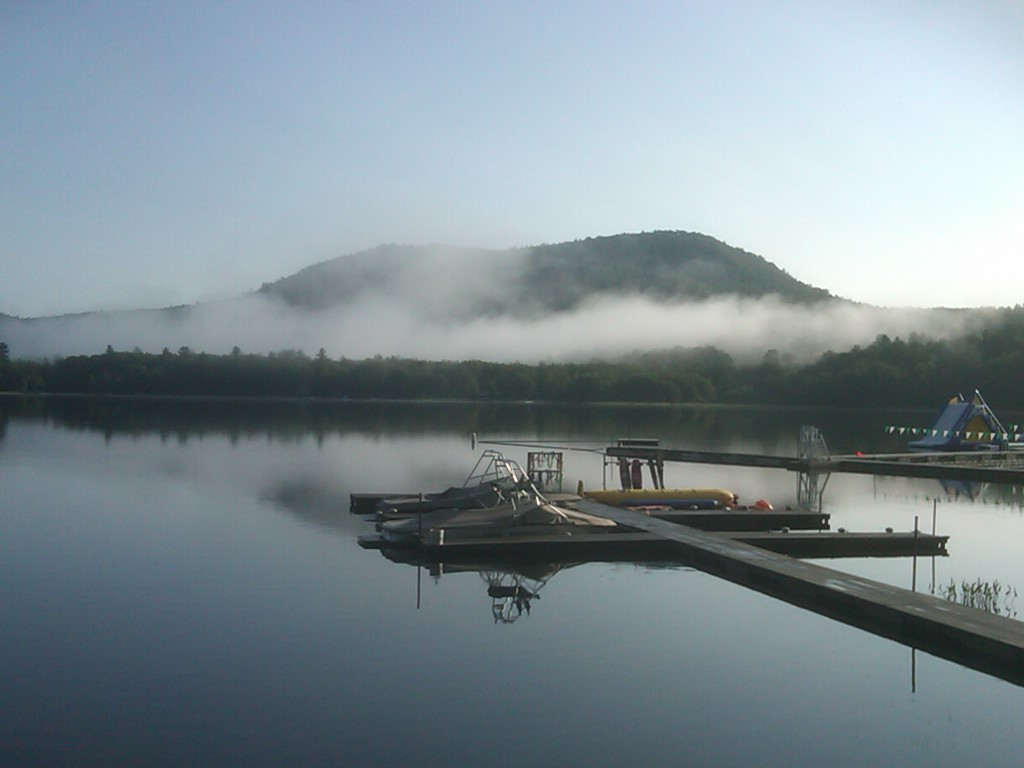
- Little Bear Pond

- Seal

- Location within Maine Location within the United States
- Coordinates: 44°22′51″N 70°21′20″W
- Country: United States
- State: Maine
- County: Oxford

Area
  - Total: 45.08 sq mi (116.76 km^{2})
  - Land: 43.87 sq mi (113.62 km^{2})
  - Water: 1.21 sq mi (3.13 km^{2})
- Elevation: 479 ft (146 m)

Population (2020)
  - Total: 1,203
  - Density: 27/sq mi (10.6/km^{2})
- Time zone: UTC-5 (Eastern (EST))
  - Summer (DST): UTC-4 (EDT)
- ZIP Code: 04220
- Area code: 207
- FIPS code: 23-31670
- GNIS feature ID: 582514
- Website: www.townofhartfordmaine.com

Hartford is a town in Oxford County, Maine, United States. Hartford is included in the Lewiston-Auburn, Maine metropolitan New England City and Town Area. The population was 1,203 at the 2020 census.

== Geography ==
According to the United States Census Bureau, the town has a total area of 45.08 square miles (116.76 km^{2}), of which 43.87 square miles (113.62 km^{2}) is land and 1.21 square miles (3.13 km^{2}) is water.

=== Climate ===
This climatic region is typified by large seasonal temperature differences, with warm to hot (and often humid) summers and cold (sometimes severely cold) winters. According to the Köppen Climate Classification system, Hartford has a humid continental climate, abbreviated "Dfb" on climate maps.

Climate data for Hartford, Maine (1991–2020)
Month	Jan	Feb	Mar	Apr	May	Jun	Jul	Aug	Sep	Oct	Nov	Dec	Year
Mean daily maximum °F (°C)	26.2 (−3.2)	29.3 (−1.5)	37.7 (3.2)	51.1 (10.6)	64.1 (17.8)	72.1 (22.3)	77.6 (25.3)	76.6 (24.8)	69.2 (20.7)	56.2 (13.4)	43.6 (6.4)	32.2 (0.1)	53.0 (11.7)
Daily mean °F (°C)	17.4 (−8.1)	19.6 (−6.9)	28.4 (−2.0)	41.1 (5.1)	53.1 (11.7)	61.6 (16.4)	67.0 (19.4)	65.6 (18.7)	58.0 (14.4)	46.3 (7.9)	35.3 (1.8)	24.6 (−4.1)	43.2 (6.2)
Mean daily minimum °F (°C)	8.7 (−12.9)	9.8 (−12.3)	19.1 (−7.2)	31.0 (−0.6)	42.1 (5.6)	51.2 (10.7)	56.4 (13.6)	54.7 (12.6)	46.8 (8.2)	36.4 (2.4)	27.0 (−2.8)	16.9 (−8.4)	33.3 (0.7)
Average precipitation inches (mm)	3.66 (93)	3.43 (87)	4.15 (105)	4.64 (118)	3.86 (98)	4.95 (126)	4.20 (107)	3.98 (101)	3.85 (98)	5.59 (142)	4.54 (115)	4.53 (115)	51.38 (1,305)
Average snowfall inches (cm)	21.8 (55)	29.0 (74)	22.2 (56)	6.4 (16)	0.3 (0.76)	0.0 (0.0)	0.0 (0.0)	0.0 (0.0)	0.0 (0.0)	1.2 (3.0)	5.7 (14)	21.1 (54)	107.7 (272.76)
Source: NOAA

== Demographics ==
Historical population
Census	Pop.	Note	%±
1810	720		—
1820	1,133		57.4%
1830	1,294		14.2%
1840	1,472		13.8%
1850	1,293		−12.2%
1860	1,156		−10.6%
1870	996		−13.8%
1880	863		−13.4%
1890	689		−20.2%
1900	660		−4.2%
1910	592		−10.3%
1920	525		−11.3%
1930	432		−17.7%
1940	430		−0.5%
1950	381		−11.4%
1960	325		−14.7%
1970	312		−4.0%
1980	480		53.8%
1990	722		50.4%
2000	963		33.4%
2010	1,185		23.1%
2020	1,203		1.5%
U.S. Decennial Census

Hartford is the home of Camp Wekeela during the summer, located on Little Bear Pond.

=== 2010 census ===
As of the census of 2010, there were 1,185 people, 479 households, and 333 families living in the town. The population density was 27.0 inhabitants per square mile (10.4/km^{2}). There were 723 housing units at an average density of 16.5 per square mile (6.4/km^{2}). The racial makeup of the town was 95.8% White, 0.1% African American, 1.0% Native American, 0.1% Asian, 0.3% from other races, and 2.7% from two or more races. Hispanic or Latino of any race were 0.5% of the population.

There were 479 households, of which 27.3% had children under the age of 18 living with them, 56.2% were married couples living together, 7.5% had a female householder with no husband present, 5.8% had a male householder with no wife present, and 30.5% were non-families. 21.5% of all households were made up of individuals, and 6.1% had someone living alone who was 65 years of age or older. The average household size was 2.47 and the average family size was 2.83.

The median age in the town was 43.6 years. 20.8% of residents were under the age of 18; 6.9% were between the ages of 18 and 24; 24.5% were from 25 to 44; 35% were from 45 to 64; and 12.8% were 65 years of age or older. The gender makeup of the town was 50.5% male and 49.5% female.

=== 2000 census ===
As of the census of 2000, there were 963 people, 364 households, and 270 families living in the town. The population density was 21.9 inhabitants per square mile (8.5/km^{2}). There were 583 housing units at an average density of 13.3 per square mile (5.1/km^{2}). The racial makeup of the town was 97.72% White, 0.10% African American, 0.62% Native American, 0.10% from other races, and 1.45% from two or more races. Hispanic or Latino of any race were 0.83% of the population.

There were 364 households, out of which 37.4% had children under the age of 18 living with them, 64.6% were married couples living together, 6.0% had a female householder with no husband present, and 25.8% were non-families. 20.3% of all households were made up of individuals, and 5.8% had someone living alone who was 65 years of age or older. The average household size was 2.65 and the average family size was 3.08.

In the town, the population was spread out, with 28.1% under the age of 18, 4.3% from 18 to 24, 31.3% from 25 to 44, 24.0% from 45 to 64, and 12.4% who were 65 years of age or older. The median age was 39 years. For every 100 females, there were 102.3 males. For every 100 females age 18 and over, there were 112.9 males.

The median income for a household in the town was $36,488, and the median income for a family was $41,000. Males had a median income of $35,865 versus $23,750 for females. The per capita income for the town was $16,326. About 9.1% of families and 12.7% of the population were below the poverty line, including 19.6% of those under age 18 and 10.3% of those age 65 or over.
