= New England city and town area =

Geographic and statistical entity in the United States

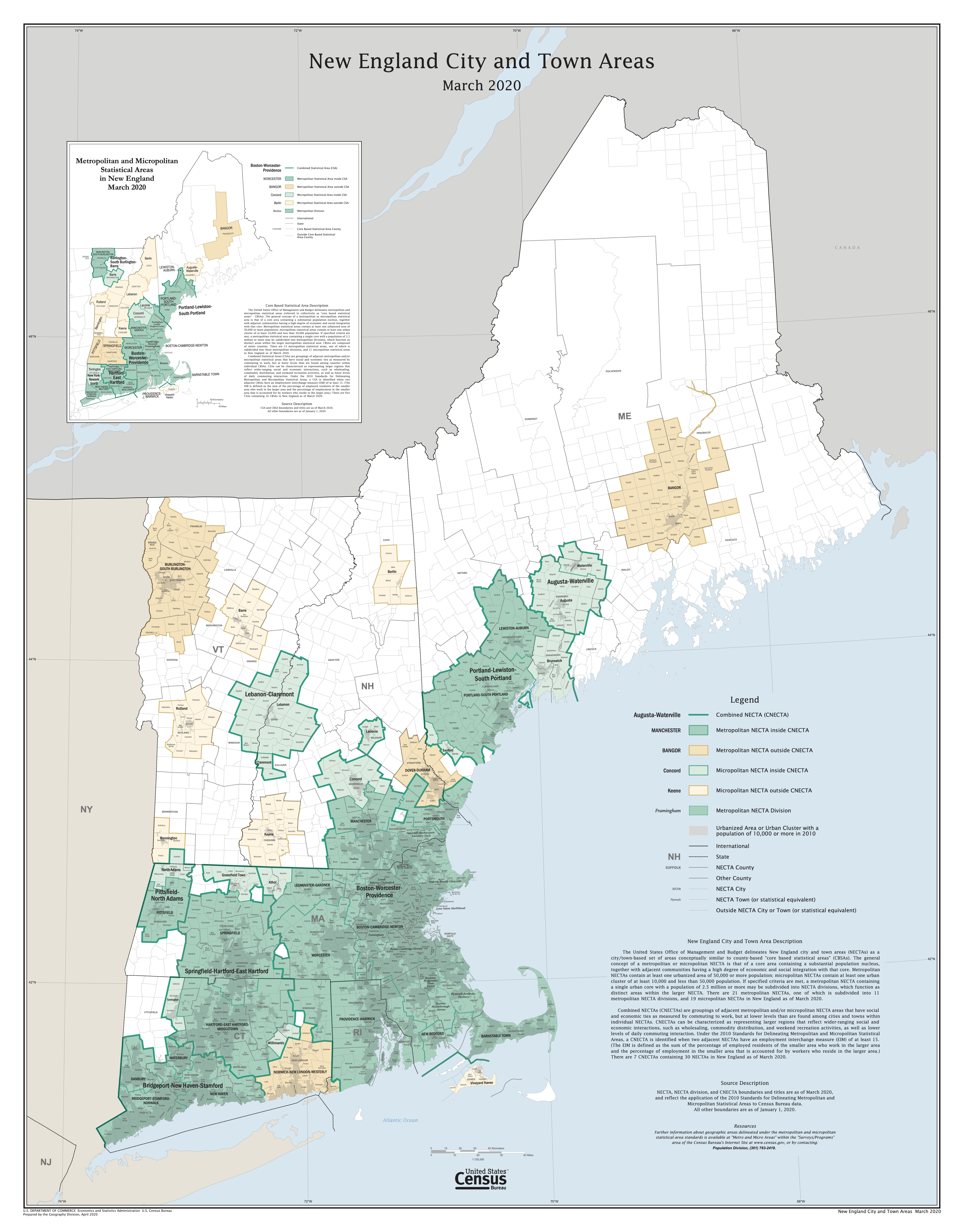
NECTA divisions as of 2020

A New England city and town area (NECTA) was a geographic and statistical entity defined by the U.S. federal government for use in the six-state New England region of the United States. NECTAs are analogous to metropolitan statistical areas and micropolitan statistical areas and are defined using the same criteria, except that they are defined on the basis of New England towns instead of entire counties. NECTAs are classified as either metropolitan or micropolitan NECTAs. A micropolitan NECTA has an urban core with a population of at least 10,000 but less than 50,000, whereas a metropolitan NECTA has an urban core with a population of at least 50,000. Tabulations of census information by NECTA was discontinued effective July 2023.

In New England, towns (which are classified by the United States Census Bureau as minor civil divisions) are a much more important level of government than counties. Because towns are smaller than counties, a NECTA usually provides a much closer approximation to the real metropolitan area than a metropolitan statistical area does.

Large NECTAs (with population greater than 2.5 million) may be subdivided into smaller groupings known as NECTA Divisions. Adjacent NECTAs that have a high degree of employment interchange may also be combined to form Combined NECTAS (or CNECTAs). NECTAs that are part of a CNECTA retain their separate identities.

== Lists of NECTAs ==
The following is a list of metropolitan and micropolitan NECTAs as defined by the Office of Management and Budget. Definitions are as of March 2020.

NECTA	Division	Combined NECTA	State(s)
Athol Micropolitan		Boston–Providence–Worcester Metropolitan	MA
Augusta Micropolitan		Augusta–Waterville Micropolitan	ME
Bangor Metropolitan			ME
Barnstable Town Metropolitan		Boston–Providence–Worcester Metropolitan	MA
Barre Micropolitan			VT
Bennington Micropolitan			VT
Berlin Micropolitan			NH
Boston–Cambridge–Newton Metropolitan	Boston–Cambridge–Newton	Boston–Providence–Worcester Metropolitan	MA
Boston–Cambridge–Newton Metropolitan	Brockton–Bridgewater Town–Easton	Boston–Providence–Worcester Metropolitan	MA
Boston–Cambridge–Newton Metropolitan	Framingham	Boston–Providence–Worcester Metropolitan	MA
Boston–Cambridge–Newton Metropolitan	Haverhill–Newburyport–Amesbury Town	Boston–Providence–Worcester Metropolitan	MA-NH
Boston–Cambridge–Newton Metropolitan	Lawrence–Methuen Town–North Andover	Boston–Providence–Worcester Metropolitan	MA-NH
Boston–Cambridge–Newton Metropolitan	Lowell–Billerica–Chelmsford	Boston–Providence–Worcester Metropolitan	MA-NH
Boston–Cambridge–Newton Metropolitan	Lynn–Salem–Marblehead	Boston–Providence–Worcester Metropolitan	MA
Boston–Cambridge–Newton Metropolitan	Nashua	Boston–Providence–Worcester Metropolitan	NH-MA
Boston–Cambridge–Newton Metropolitan	Peabody–Beverly–Gloucester	Boston–Providence–Worcester Metropolitan	MA
Boston–Cambridge–Newton Metropolitan	Plymouth–Pembroke–Duxbury	Boston–Providence–Worcester Metropolitan	MA
Boston–Cambridge–Newton Metropolitan	Taunton–Middleborough–Norton	Boston–Providence–Worcester Metropolitan	MA
Bridgeport–Stamford–Norwalk Metropolitan		Bridgeport–New Haven–Stamford Metropolitan	CT
Brunswick Micropolitan		Portland–Lewiston–South Portland Metropolitan	ME
Burlington–South Burlington Metropolitan			VT
Claremont Micropolitan		Lebanon–Claremont Micropolitan	NH
Concord Micropolitan		Boston–Providence–Worcester Metropolitan	NH
Danbury Metropolitan		Bridgeport–New Haven–Stamford Metropolitan	CT
Dover–Durham Micropolitan			NH-ME
Greenfield Town Micropolitan		Springfield-Hartford-East Hartford Metropolitan	MA
Hartford–East Hartford–Middletown Metropolitan		Springfield-Hartford-East Hartford Metropolitan	CT
Laconia Micropolitan			NH
Lebanon Micropolitan		Lebanon–Claremont Micropolitan	NH-VT
Leominster–Gardner Metropolitan		Boston–Providence–Worcester Metropolitan	MA
Lewiston–Auburn Metropolitan		Portland–Lewiston–South Portland Metropolitan	ME
Manchester Metropolitan		Boston–Providence–Worcester Metropolitan	NH
New Bedford Metropolitan		Boston–Providence–Worcester Metropolitan	MA
New Haven Metropolitan		Bridgeport–New Haven–Stamford Metropolitan	CT
Norwich–New London–Westerly Metropolitan			CT-RI
North Adams Micropolitan		Pittsfield–North Adams Metropolitan	MA-VT
Pittsfield Metropolitan		Pittsfield–North Adams Metropolitan	MA
Portland–South Portland Metropolitan		Portland–Lewiston–South Portland Metropolitan	ME
Portsmouth Metropolitan		Boston–Providence–Worcester Metropolitan	NH-ME
Providence–Warwick Metropolitan		Boston–Providence–Worcester Metropolitan	RI-MA
Sanford Micropolitan		Portland–Lewiston–South Portland Metropolitan	ME
Springfield Metropolitan		Springfield-Hartford-East Hartford Metropolitan	MA-CT
Torrington Micropolitan		Springfield-Hartford-East Hartford Metropolitan	CT
Waterbury Metropolitan		Bridgeport–New Haven–Stamford Metropolitan	CT
Waterville Micropolitan		Augusta–Waterville Micropolitan	ME
Willimantic Micropolitan		Springfield-Hartford-East Hartford Metropolitan	CT
Worcester Metropolitan		Boston–Providence–Worcester Metropolitan	MA-CT
Vineyard Haven Micropolitan			MA
