= Lewiston–Auburn =

Twin cities in Maine, United States

Lewiston-Auburn, Maine
- Twin cities
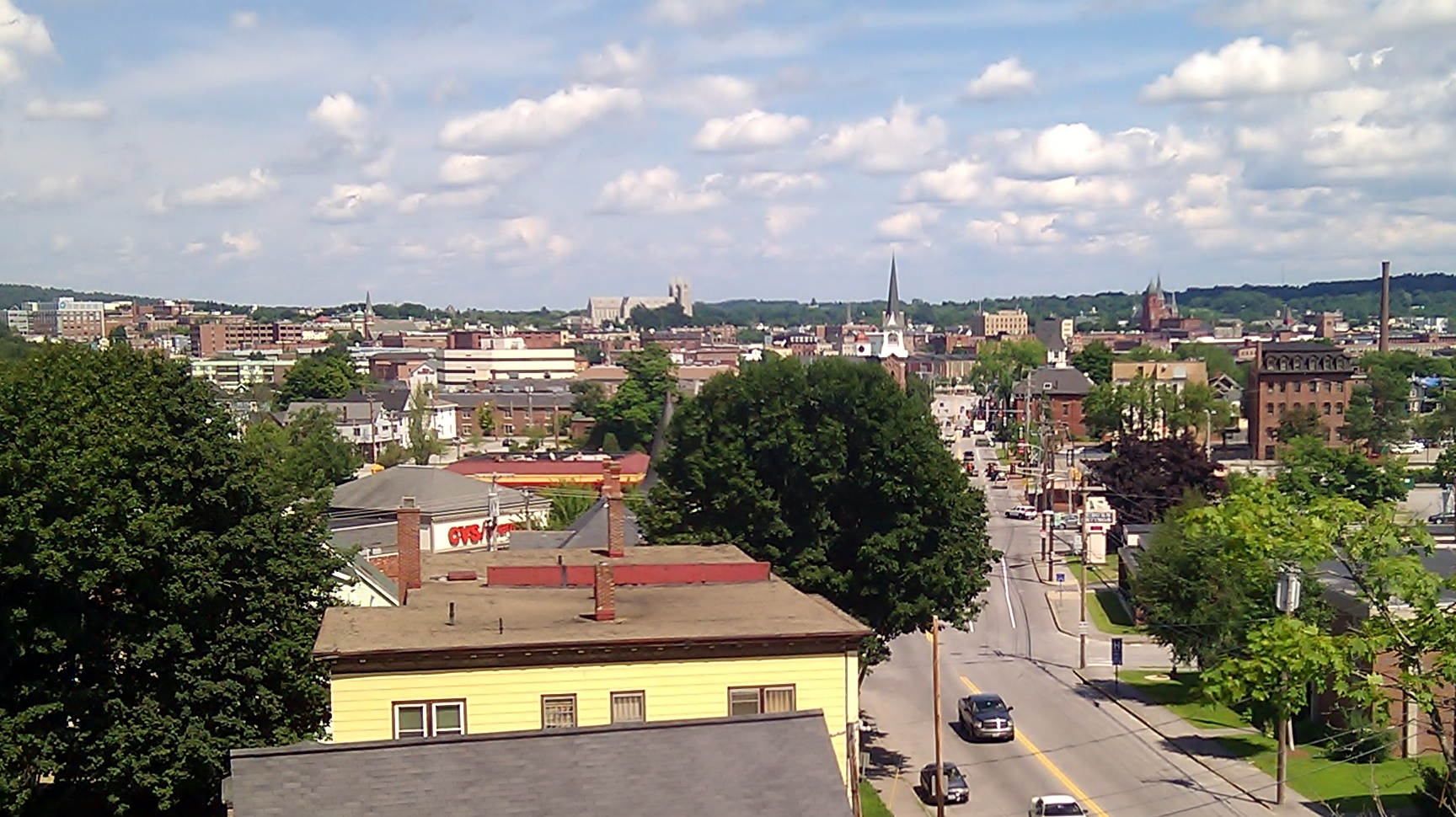
- Motto: L/A: It's Happening Here!
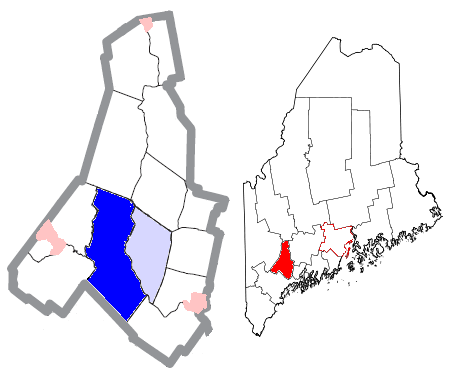
- Location of Auburn (dark blue) and Lewiston (light blue).

Lewiston–Auburn (L–A) are twin cities in Androscoggin County, Maine, USA. Together, they have a population of 61,182 in a combined 101 square miles (260 km^{2}). The cities are commonly called "Cities of the Androscoggin," as they are seated along the banks of the Androscoggin River which separates them. They share infrastructure and transportation, such as the Lewiston-Auburn CityLink, the Lewiston and Auburn Railroad Company and the Auburn/Lewiston Municipal Airport. They also form the Lewiston-Auburn Metropolitan Statistical Area, which encompasses Androscoggin County. The Lewiston–Auburn Economic Growth Council has been promoting the cities as one community for decades in its campaign to promote growth in industry and business.

== French-Canadian heritage ==
The twin cities have a long history of French-Canadian immigration, and still retain a very large percentage of citizens who identify as so. In the 2000 census, 19.4% of those five and older in the cities combined (more so on the Lewiston side of the river) said that they spoke French.

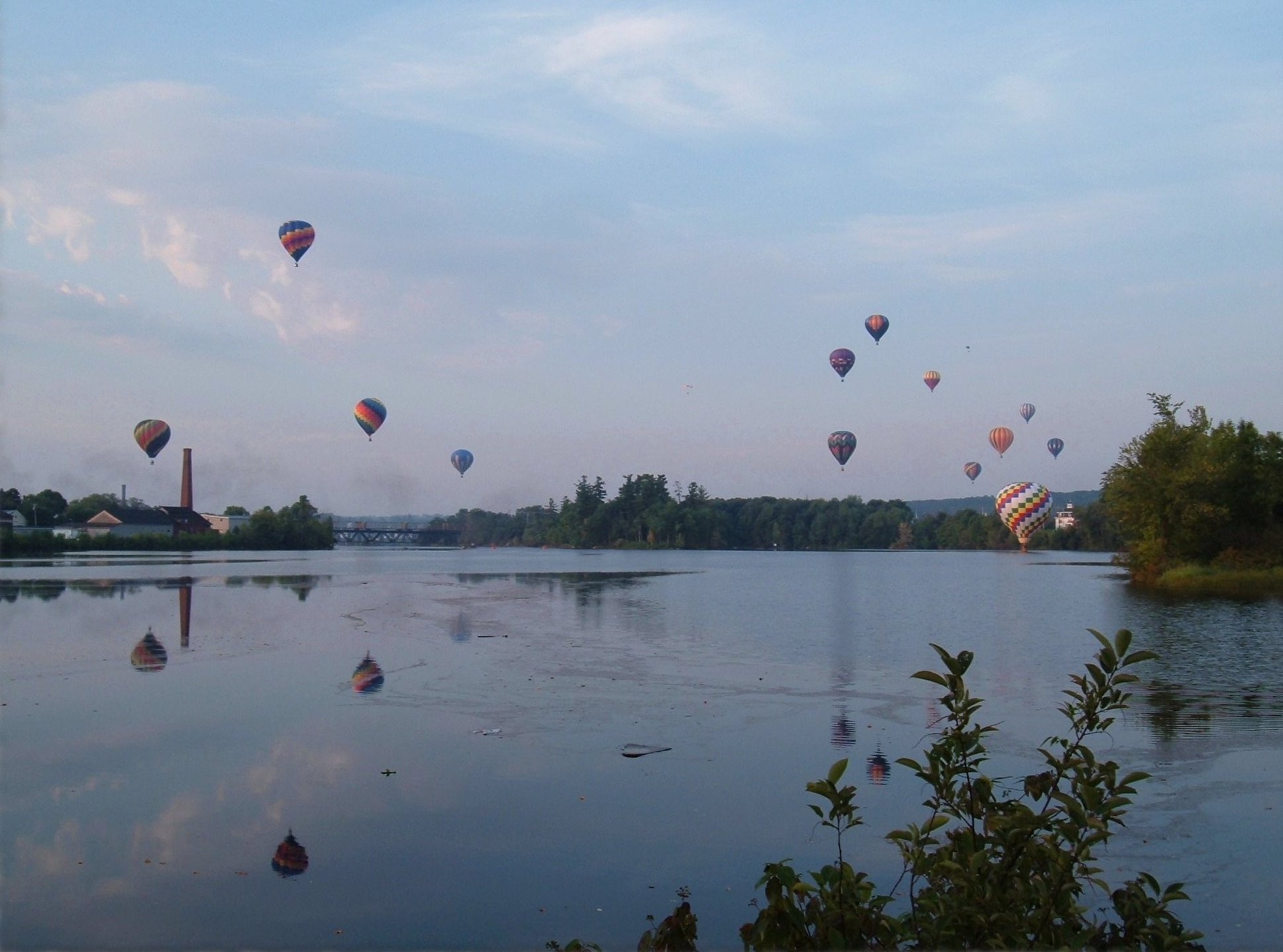
Home of the annual Great Falls Balloon Festival

== Auburn ==
Auburn was incorporated in 1842, and has a population of 24,061.

== Lewiston ==
Lewiston was incorporated in 1863, and has a population of 37,121.

== Merging cities ==
For years, the idea of consolidating the cities into one has floated around. Proponents have cited budget savings and the already existing sense of community and unity that exists. In May 2013, city councilors from both cities discussed the possibility of merging through a new voter-approved charter. With most in support, they agreed to discuss further in detail at a later point.

In 2017, a vote on merging the two cities appeared on city ballots. The measure was rejected by a wide margin, with 84% of Auburn voters and 66% of Lewiston voters rejecting the merger.
