= Maine State Route 35 =

State highway in southwestern Maine, US

State Route 35

Route information
- Maintained by MaineDOT
- Length: 90.91 mi (146.31 km)
- Existed: 1964 (current alignment)–present

Major junctions
- South end: SR 9 / SR 9A in Kennebunk
- US 1 / SR 9A in Kennebunk; I-95 / Maine Turnpike in Kennebunk; US 202 / SR 4 / SR 4A in Hollis; US 302 in Windham/Naples; SR 11 in Naples
- North end: US 2 / SR 5 in Bethel

Location
- Country: United States
- State: Maine
- Counties: York, Cumberland, Oxford

Highway system
- Maine State Highway System; Interstate; US; State; Auto trails; Lettered highways
← SR 32	→ SR 37

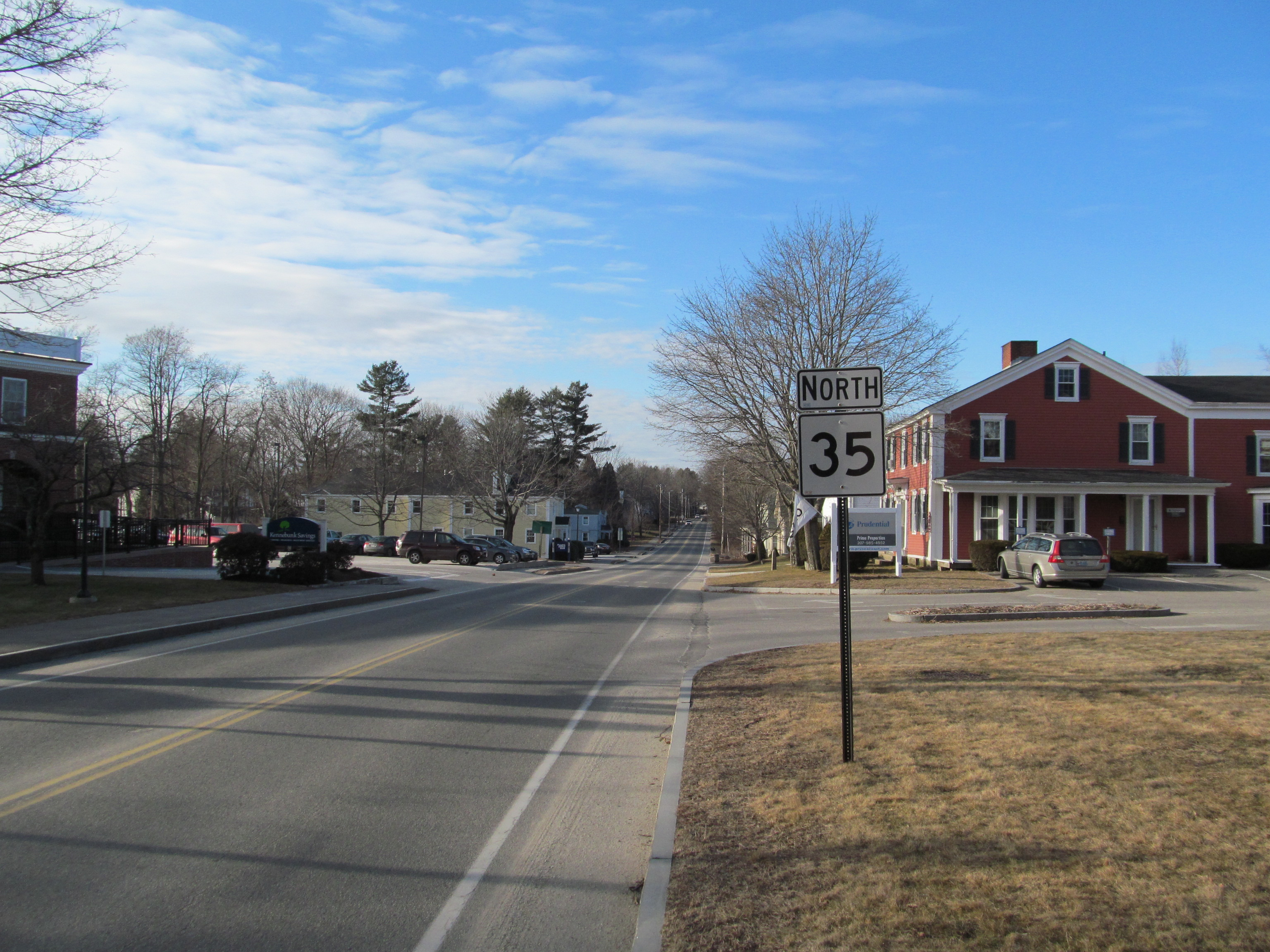
Northbound in Kennebunk

State Route 35 (SR 35) runs the course of western Maine, from Kennebunk to Bethel. It passes through York, Cumberland, and Oxford counties. It is known in its lower sections for both its unusually windy course as well as its notoriously poor paving, as a result of winter frost heaves. Its northern section leads to the famous ski resort, Sunday River. The route crosses the Presumpscot River and a well-preserved section of the Cumberland and Oxford Canal approximately one mile (1.6 km) west of U.S. Route 302 (US 302) in North Windham.

== Junction list ==
County	Location	mi	km	Destinations	Notes
York	Kennebunk	0.00	0.00	SR 9 / SR 9A west – Kennebunkport, Wells	Southern terminus of SR 35 at SR 9. Eastern terminus of SR 9A at SR 9; eastern terminus of concurrency with SR 9A
York	Kennebunk	3.5	5.6	US 1 north – Biddeford, Arundel	Northern terminus of wrong-way concurrency with US 1
York	Kennebunk	3.6	5.8	US 1 south / SR 9A west – Kittery, Wells	Northern terminus of concurrencies with US 1 and SR 9A
York	Kennebunk	5.3	8.5	I-95 / Maine Turnpike – Portland, Saco, Biddeford, Wells, Kittery, Boston, Kennebunk Service Plaza	Exit 25 on I-95 / Turnpike
York	Lyman	12.0	19.3	SR 111 – Alfred, Biddeford	
York	Dayton	17.0	27.4	SR 5 – Waterboro, Saco	
York	Hollis	21.3	34.3	US 202 / SR 4 / SR 4A north – East Waterboro, Bar Mills	Southern terminus of SR 4A and concurrency with SR 4A
York	Hollis	21.6	34.8	SR 4A north – Bar Mills	Northern terminus of concurrency with SR 4A
York	Hollis	21.7	34.9	SR 117 – Limington, Cornish	
York	Hollis	26.7	43.0	Moderation Street; To SR 112 – West Buxton	
York	Buxton	29.5	47.5	SR 22 east – Buxton, Portland	Western terminus of SR 22
Cumberland	Standish	33.3	53.6	SR 25 – Cornish, Gorham	
Cumberland	Standish	35.4	57.0	SR 114	
Cumberland	Standish	37.0	59.5	SR 237 south – Gorham	Northern terminus of SR 237
Cumberland	Windham	42.3	68.1	US 302 east / SR 115 east – Portland	Eastern terminus of concurrency with US 302; western terminus of SR 115
Cumberland	Raymond	46.7	75.2	SR 85 north	Southern terminus of SR 85
Cumberland	Raymond	47.2	76.0	SR 121 north – Raymond Vil., Casco	Southern terminus of SR 121
Cumberland	Naples	54.9	88.4	SR 11 north – Poland, Mechanic Falls	Northern terminus of wrong-way concurrency with SR 11
Cumberland	Naples	55.8	89.8	US 302 west / SR 11 south – Bridgton	Northern terminus of concurrencies with US 302 and SR 11
Cumberland	Harrison	66.9	107.7	SR 117 north – Norway	Northern terminus of wrong-way concurrency with SR 117
Cumberland	Harrison	67.2	108.1	SR 117 south – Bridgton	Southern terminus of wrong-way concurrency with SR 117
Oxford	Waterford	69.8	112.3	SR 37 south – Bridgton	Southern terminus of concurrency with SR 37
Oxford	Waterford	72.5	116.7	SR 37 north – Norway	Northern terminus of concurrency with SR 37
Oxford	Waterford	77.1	124.1	SR 118 east – Norway	Western terminus of SR 118
Oxford	Albany Township	78.1	125.7	SR 5 south – Lovell, Fryeburg	Southern terminus of concurrency with SR 5
Oxford	Bethel	90.8	146.1	US 2 / SR 5 north – Gorham NH, Bethel	Northern terminus of concurrency with SR 5
1.000 mi = 1.609 km; 1.000 km = 0.621 mi: Concurrency terminus
