= Maine State Route 37 =

State highway in Maine, US

State Route 37

Route information
- Maintained by MaineDOT
- Length: 9.25 mi (14.89 km)
- Existed: c. 1937–present

Major junctions
- South end: SR 117 in Bridgton
- SR 35 in Waterford
- North end: SR 118 in Waterford

Location
- Country: United States
- State: Maine
- Counties: Cumberland, Oxford

Highway system
- Maine State Highway System; Interstate; US; State; Auto trails; Lettered highways
← SR 35	→ SR 41

State Route 37 (abbreviated SR 37) is part of the system of numbered state highways of Maine, United States, and is located in the western part of the state. It runs for 9 1/4 miles (14.9 km) from an intersection with SR 117 in Bridgton to an intersection with SR 118 in Waterford. The route is also known as North Bridgton Road. The middle portion of the route is concurrent with SR 35.

== Route description ==
SR 37 begins in the south at the village of North Bridgton, where it splits off from SR 117. It runs northward, crossing into Waterford in Oxford County, and intersects SR 35 near Bear Lake. SR 35 and SR 37 are cosigned for 2.7 miles (4.3 km) before SR 37 splits off near Keoka Lake, heading east to terminate at SR 118 at the Crooked River.

== Junction list ==
County	Location	mi	km	Destinations	Notes
Cumberland	Bridgton	0.00	0.00	SR 117 (Harrison Road) – Bridgton, Harrison	
Oxford	Waterford	3.62	5.83	SR 35 south (Waterford Road) – Harrison, Naples	Southern terminus of SR 35/37 concurrency
Oxford	Waterford	6.27	10.09	SR 35 north – Stoneham, Bethel	Northern terminus of SR 35/37 concurrency
Oxford	Waterford	9.25	14.89	SR 118 (Norway Road) – Waterford, Norway	Northern terminus of SR 37
1.000 mi = 1.609 km; 1.000 km = 0.621 mi: Concurrency terminus
