= Maine State Route 160 =

State highway in southwestern Maine, US

State Route 160

Route information
- Maintained by MaineDOT
- Length: 32.64 mi (52.53 km)
- Existed: 1933–present

Major junctions
- South end: SR 5 in Limerick
- SR 25 in Porter; SR 5 / SR 113 in Brownfield
- North end: SR 117 in Denmark

Location
- Country: United States
- State: Maine
- Counties: York, Oxford

Highway system
- Maine State Highway System; Interstate; US; State; Auto trails; Lettered highways
← SR 159	→ SR 161

State Route 160 (abbreviated SR 160) is part of Maine's system of numbered state highways, located in the southwestern part of the state. It is a north–south highway running 32.64 miles (52.53 km) from an intersection with State Route 5 in Limerick to an intersection with State Route 117 in Denmark.

== Route description ==
SR 160 begins in downtown Limerick at SR 5, about 100 yards (91 m) from that route's intersection with SR 11. Heading out of town almost due north, the highway roughly parallels SR 5 for its southernmost five miles (8 km). SR 160 nicks the northwestern corner of Cornish, then crosses into Parsonsfield and turns to the northwest, crossing through the eastern and northern sections of town. Turning due north once again, SR 160 crosses the Ossipee River into the town of Porter in Oxford County and intersects SR 25 about 3 miles (4.8 km) east of the New Hampshire border. SR 160 joins SR 25 eastbound and the two routes run along the northern bank of the river for 2.6 miles (4.2 km).

SR 160 splits from SR 25 and turns back to the north, running along the town border between Porter and Hiram. The highway crosses between the western edge of Hiram and northeastern corner of Porter twice before entering Brownfield. SR 160 continues northwest until reaching Main Street, where it abruptly turns northeast towards the town center and crosses SR 5 / SR 113. SR 160 crosses the Saco River before turning due east and crossing into Denmark. The highway continues east as West Main Street into downtown, where it ends at an intersection with SR 117.

Between Limerick and Brownfield, SR 160 is the westernmost north-south highway in the state.

== History ==
Modern SR 160, as first designated in 1933, was 17.6 miles (28.3 km) in length and had its southern terminus at SR 25 near Kezar Falls in Porter. In 1937-8, the SR 160 designation was applied to a new routing through Parsonsfield southward to the current terminus in downtown Limerick. SR 160 was co-routed along SR 25 in Porter to connect the two segments, adding 15 miles (24 km) to the route's overall length.

The first highway in Maine designated SR 160 was located in the extreme northern part of the state and ran between Saint Francis and Madawaska in 1925. Following the designation of U.S. Highways in 1926, the eastern end of the route was truncated to Fort Kent, with part of it becoming the northernmost stretch of US 1. The remainder of the route was originally decommissioned, but is now part of SR 161.

== Major intersections ==
County	Location	mi	km	Destinations	Notes
York	Limerick	0.0	0.0	SR 5 (Sokokis Trail North / Main Street) to SR 11 – Waterboro, Cornish	Southern terminus
Oxford	Porter	12.4	20.0	SR 25 west (Ossipee Trail) – Freedom NH	Southern end of concurrency with SR 25
Oxford	Porter	15.0	24.1	SR 25 east (Ossipee Trail) – Cornish, Limington	Northern end of concurrency with SR 25
Oxford	Brownfield	27.0	43.5	SR 5 / SR 113 (Pequawket Trail) – Hiram, Fryeburg	
Oxford	Denmark	32.6	52.5	SR 117 (South Road / East Main Street) – Hiram, Bridgton	Northern terminus
1.000 mi = 1.609 km; 1.000 km = 0.621 mi: Concurrency terminus
