= Maine State Route 117 =

State highway in Maine, US

State Route 117

Route information
- Maintained by MaineDOT
- Length: 87.64 mi (141.04 km)
- Existed: 1925, 1951 (current alignment)–present

Major junctions
- South end: SR 112 in Saco
- US 202 / SR 4 in Buxton; SR 11 in Limington; SR 25 in Limington; SR 5 in Cornish; SR 5 / SR 113 in Baldwin; US 302 in Bridgton; SR 26 in Norway; SR 4 in Turner
- North end: SR 219 in Turner

Location
- Country: United States
- State: Maine
- Counties: York, Cumberland, Oxford, Androscoggin

Highway system
- Maine State Highway System; Interstate; US; State; Auto trails; Lettered highways
← SR 116	→ SR 118

State Route 117 (SR 117) is part of Maine's system of numbered state highways, running from SR 112 in Saco to SR 219 in Turner.

== Route description ==
SR 117 begins at SR 112 in Saco. It travels north through Buxton and Hollis, running concurrently with U.S. Route 202 (US 202) and SR 4 for 2 miles (3.2 km). It turns off and continues through the towns of Hollis, Limington, and Waterboro. From there, SR 117 travels concurrently with SR 25 for 3 miles (4.8 km), entering Cornish, then turns off. It is shortly joined by SR 5. It runs concurrently with only SR 5 for 2 miles (3.2 km) into Baldwin, and with SR 5 and SR 113 for 5 miles (8.0 km) into Hiram. In Hiram, SR 117 leaves SR 113 and SR 5, and enters Denmark. SR 117 continues on into Bridgton where it eventually intersects US 302. SR 117 runs concurrently with US 302 for 2 miles (3.2 km). It then continues on into the towns of Harrison and Norway. It runs concurrently with SR 118 for 2 miles (3.2 km) until its end at the intersection of SR 26. It then runs concurrently with SR 26 for 1 mile (1.6 km) into Paris. From there, it continues into Buckfield and then Turner, where it reaches it northern terminus at SR 219.

== Junction list ==
County	Location	mi	km	Destinations	Notes
York	Saco	0.0	0.0	SR 112 – Saco	
York	Buxton	2.4	3.9	US 202 east / SR 4 north – Gorham	East end of US 202/SR 4 concurrency
York	Hollis	4.1	6.6	US 202 west / SR 4 south – Waterboro, Alfred	West end of US 202/SR 4 concurrency
York	Hollis	4.4	7.1	SR 4A – Alfred, Kennebunk, Gorham, Bar Mills	
York	Hollis	4.5	7.2	SR 35 – Kennebunk, Standish	
York	Limington	16.0	25.7	SR 11 – Limerick, N. Limington	
York	Limington	20.8	33.5	SR 25 east – Standish	East end of SR 25 concurrency
York	Cornish	23.3	37.5	SR 25 west – Kezar Falls	West end of SR 25 concurrency
York	Cornish	23.4	37.7	SR 5 south	South end of SR 5 concurrency
Cumberland	Baldwin	24.8	39.9	SR 113 south – Steep Falls	South end of SR 113 concurrency
Oxford	Hiram	29.9	48.1	SR 5 north / SR 113 north – Fryeburg	North end of SR 5/SR 113 concurrency
Oxford	Denmark	37.1	59.7	SR 160 – E. Brownfield	Northern terminus of SR 160
Cumberland	Bridgton	43.7	70.3	SR 107 – Sebago, Baldwin	Northern terminus of SR 107
Cumberland	Bridgton	44.6	71.8	US 302 east – Naples	South end of US 302 concurrency
Cumberland	Bridgton	46.1	74.2	US 302 west – Fryeburg	North end of US 302 concurrency
Cumberland	Bridgton	49.1	79.0	SR 37 – North Bridgton, Waterford	Southern terminus of SR 37
Cumberland	Harrison	50.6	81.4	SR 35 north – Waterford	North end of SR 35 concurrency
Cumberland	Harrison	50.8	81.8	SR 35 south – Naples	South end of SR 35 concurrency
Oxford	Norway	61.3	98.7	SR 118 west – Waterford, North Waterford	West end of SR 118 concurrency
Oxford	Norway	63.3	101.9	SR 118 ends	East end of SR 118 concurrency; eastern terminus of SR 118
Oxford	Norway	63.7	102.5	SR 26 south – Auburn, Gray, Oxford, Portland	South end of SR 26 concurrency
Oxford	Paris	64.9	104.4	SR 26 north / SR 119 – Bethel, Gorham N.H.	North end of SR 26/SR 119 concurrencies; northern terminus of SR 119
Oxford	Paris	65.3	105.1	SR 119 south – Hebron	South end of SR 119 concurrency
Oxford	Buckfield	74.9	120.5	SR 140 – East Sumner, Hartford	Southern terminus of SR 140
Oxford	Buckfield	77.6	124.9	SR 124 – Hebron, Mechanic Falls, Minot	Northern terminus of SR 124
Androscoggin	Turner	81.5	131.2	SR 4 – Auburn, Livermore	
Androscoggin	Turner	88.16	141.88	SR 219 – North Turner, Wayne	
1.000 mi = 1.609 km; 1.000 km = 0.621 mi: Concurrency terminus
