= Maine State Route 113 =

State highway in southwestern Maine, US

State Route 113
- Route of SR 113 highlighted in red; New Hampshire portions in orange; NH 113B in purple

Route information
- Maintained by MaineDOT and NHDOT
- Length: 54.81 mi (88.21 km)
- Existed: 1941–present

Major junctions
- South end: SR 25 in Standish
- SR 11 near Standish; US 302 / SR 5 in Fryeburg
- North end: US 2 in Gilead

Location
- Country: United States
- State: Maine
- Counties: Cumberland, Oxford, Carroll (NH)

Highway system
- Maine State Highway System; Interstate; US; State; Auto trails; Lettered highways
← SR 112	→ SR 114
← NH 113A	NH	→ NH 114

State Route 113 (SR 113) is a state highway in southwestern Maine (and partly in extreme eastern New Hampshire). It runs from an intersection with Maine State Route 25 in Standish north to the town of Gilead, where it ends at U.S. Route 2 (US 2) near the New Hampshire border. The northern portion of the route runs along the border, and actually crosses into and out of New Hampshire twice.

SR 113 is located near New Hampshire Route 113, as both routes pass through Conway, New Hampshire (linked via a short stretch of US 302). Despite this, they are two completely unrelated routes.

== History ==
State Route 113 was originally designated in 1925, running along its current routing from Standish and ending in Fryeburg at the intersection with U.S. Route 302. In 1937, the route was extended northward to Gilead along an alignment near the New Hampshire border, actually crossing the border three times along the way. Between 1940 and 1941, the original routing of Route 113 in Stow was shifted onto a new alignment (now the current alignment), with the old loop around Stow in New Hampshire becoming New Hampshire Route 113B (which is considered an unnumbered town-way in Maine).

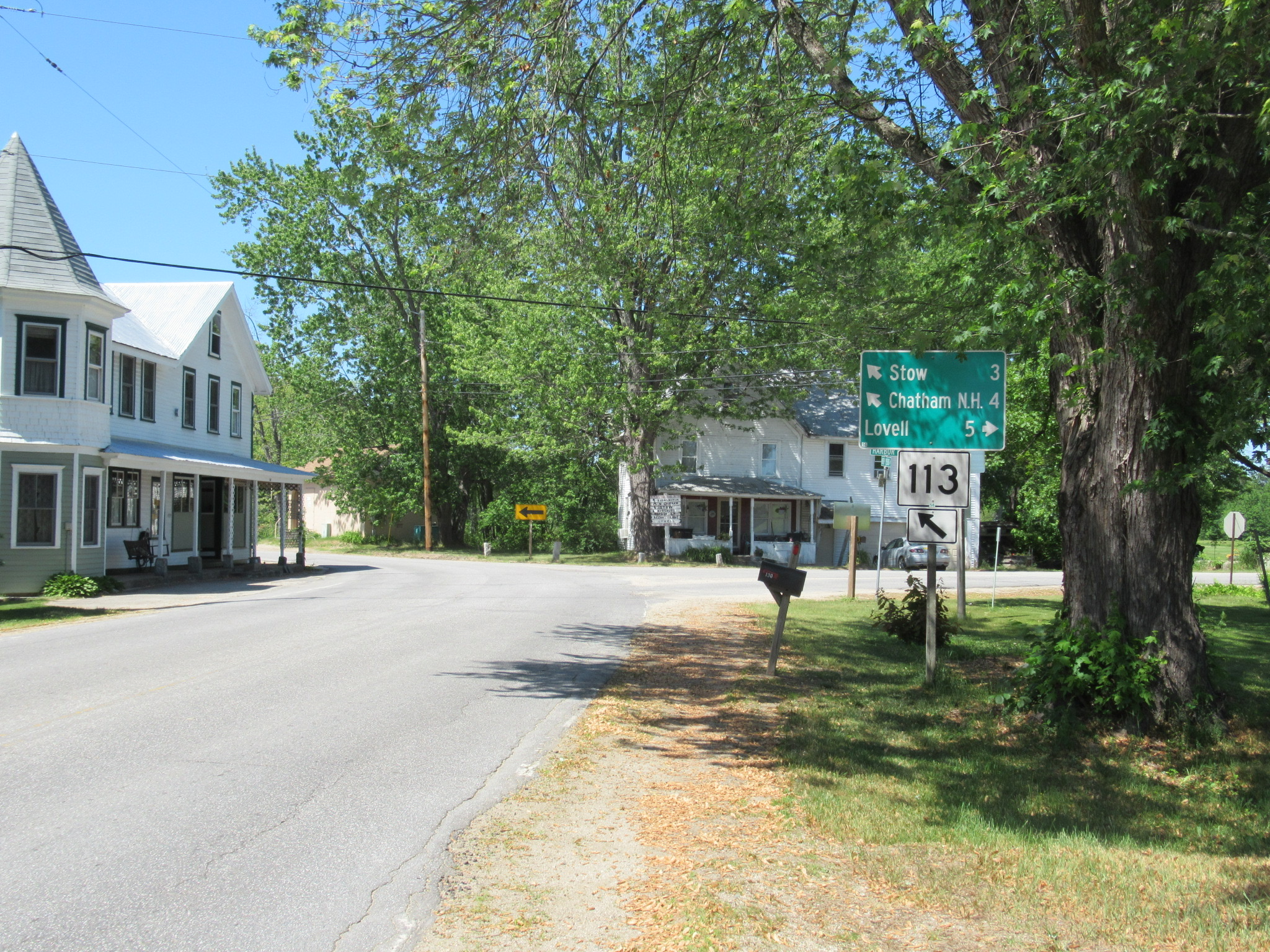
ME 113 in North Fryeburg

== Junction list ==
State	County	Location	mi	km	Destinations	Notes
Maine	Cumberland	Standish	0.0	0.0	SR 25 (Ossipee Trail West) – Gorham, Cornish	
Maine	Cumberland	Standish	5.7	9.2	SR 11 south (Main Street) – Limington	Southern end of SR 11 concurrency
Maine	Cumberland	Baldwin	7.0	11.3	SR 11 / SR 107 north (E Sebago Road) – Naples, Sebago	Northern end of SR 11 concurrency; southern terminus of SR 107
Maine	Cumberland	Baldwin	12.1	19.5	SR 5 / SR 117 south (Depot Road) – Cornish	Southern end of SR 5/SR 117 concurrency
Maine	Oxford	Hiram	16.8	27.0	SR 117 north (Main Street)	Northern end of SR 117 concurrency
Maine	Oxford	Brownfield	23.2	37.3	SR 160 (Maine Street / Denmark Road) – Brownfield, Denmark	50-foot (15 m) concurrency
Maine	Oxford	Fryeburg	30.2	48.6	US 302 east (Main Street) / SR 5 north – Lovell	Northern terminus of SR 5 concurrency; eastern terminus of US 302 concurrency
Maine	Oxford	Fryeburg	30.4	48.9	US 302 west – North Conway NH	Western terminus of US 302 concurrency
New Hampshire	Carroll	No major junctions				
Maine	Oxford	Stow	42.0	67.6	NH 113B north (Main Road) – Chatham	Southern terminus of NH 113B
Maine	Oxford	Stow	45.1	72.6	NH 113B south (Main Road) – Ctr. Chatham	Northern terminus of NH 113B
New Hampshire	Carroll	No major junctions				
Maine	Oxford	Gilead	60.6	97.5	US 2 – Gorham NH, Bethel	Northern terminus
1.000 mi = 1.609 km; 1.000 km = 0.621 mi: Concurrency terminus

== New Hampshire Route 113B ==
New Hampshire Route 113B
- Location: Stow, Maine-Chatham, New Hampshire-Stow, Maine
- Length: 3.95 mi (6.36 km)

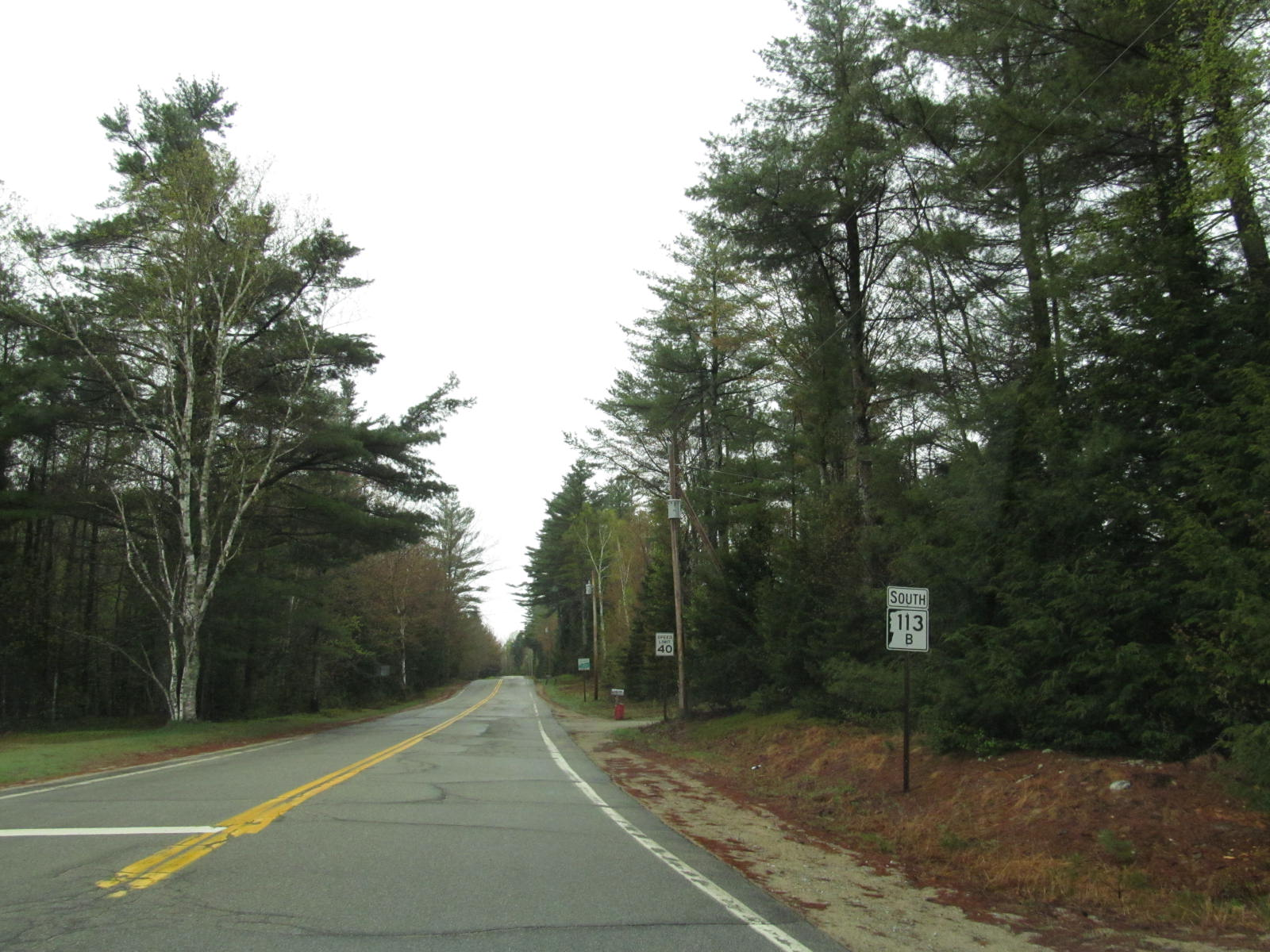
NH 113B southbound

New Hampshire Route 113B is a 3.95-mile (6.36 km) long loop road in the states of Maine and New Hampshire. Despite its designation, Route 113B never intersects its implied "parent", New Hampshire Route 113, nor does it ever approach it. Instead, Route 113B is a loop off Maine State Route 113, producing the very unusual situation of one state having a suffixed route off another state's highway.

NH 113B starts at State Route 113 in Stow, runs approximately one mile west into New Hampshire, then turns north. The route crosses the border back into Stow, and ends mere feet later at State Route 113. This intersection lies feet south of where State Route 113 crosses into North Chatham, New Hampshire.

Of the route's 3.95 miles (6.36 km), 2.95 are in New Hampshire. The sections of the highway in Maine are under MaineDOT maintenance, and are technically considered a townway (unnumbered highway).

This is the only instance in New Hampshire of a suffixed route carrying the numerics for a highway signed in another state. Three similar instances exist in New England. One is in Massachusetts with Massachusetts Route 114A, a loop of Rhode Island Route 114 (Rhode Island Route 114A is the designation for the small portions of this loop within Rhode Island). The other two are in Vermont: Vermont Route 10A is a continuation of New Hampshire Route 10A, a loop off New Hampshire Route 10, and Vermont Route 22A is a continuation of New York State Route 22A, a spur route from New York State Route 22.

This is one of two instances where a New Hampshire state route crosses entirely into another state but remains signed as a New Hampshire route. New Hampshire Route 153 skirts the eastern shore of Province Lake and crosses the border into Parsonsfield, Maine, but maintains NH 153 signage throughout.

It is currently signed on the approaching signage at the southern terminus as a Maine state route with the Maine state route shield, but the signage on the road itself maintains the New Hampshire route shield.
