= Maine State Route 118 =

State highway in Oxford County, Maine, US

State Route 118

Route information
- Maintained by MaineDOT
- Length: 13.04 mi (20.99 km)
- Existed: 1925–present

Major junctions
- West end: SR 35 in Waterford
- East end: SR 117 / Main Street in Norway

Location
- Country: United States
- State: Maine
- Counties: Oxford

Highway system
- Maine State Highway System; Interstate; US; State; Auto trails; Lettered highways
← SR 117	→ SR 119

State Route 118 is a secondary highway located in eastern Oxford County, Maine. It runs for 13.04 miles (20.99 km) between the towns of Waterford and Norway. Its western terminus in Waterford is at State Route 35 and its eastern terminus in Norway is at the intersection of Main Street and Paris Street, where it is overlapped by State Route 117.

== Route description ==
SR 118 begins at an intersection with SR 35 north of Waterford, near that route's intersection with SR 5. The highway departs to the east, passing through East Waterford and meeting the northern end of SR 37 before entering the town of Norway. SR 118 continues east into town, passing south of Lake Penneseewassee (Norway Lake) before meeting SR 117 at Harrison Road, which approaches from the south. SR 117 and SR 118 are cosigned on Lake Street, then Main Street, heading east into downtown Norway. At the intersection of Main and Paris Streets the SR 118 designation ends. SR 117 turns east onto Paris Street to meet SR 26 near the Paris town line. Main Street continues southeast for 0.3 miles (0.48 km) to terminate at Fair Street (SR 26).

== History ==
When it was first commissioned in 1925, SR 118 extended north along SR 5 into Bethel to end at SR 26. When SR 35 was designated in the early 1930s, it was cosigned along SR 5 and SR 118 along the same stretch of road. In 1938, SR 118 was truncated to its current western terminus in Waterford, eliminating the overlaps and cutting the route's overall length by more than half. In the 1980s, SR 118 was extended along SR 117 (its original eastern terminus) through downtown Norway to its current terminus at the junction of Main and Paris Streets, extending the designation 2.11 miles (3.40 km) to the east. This remains the current routing. Despite what signage suggests, SR 118 does not appear to have ever connected directly with SR 26 as SR 117 does.

== Junction list ==
The entire route is in Oxford County.

Location	mi	km	Destinations	Notes
Waterford	0.00	0.00	SR 35 (Valley Road) – Stoneham, Waterford	
Waterford	5.17	8.32	SR 37 south (Waterford Road) – South Waterford	Northern terminus of SR 37
Norway	10.93	17.59	SR 117 south (Harrison Road) – Bridgton	Western end of concurrency with SR 117
Norway	13.04	20.99	SR 117 north to SR 26 north (Paris Street) – South Paris To SR 26 south (Main Street) – Auburn, Gray	Eastern end of concurrency with SR 117
1.000 mi = 1.609 km; 1.000 km = 0.621 mi: Concurrency terminus
