= Limington Academy =

- U.S. National Register of Historic Places
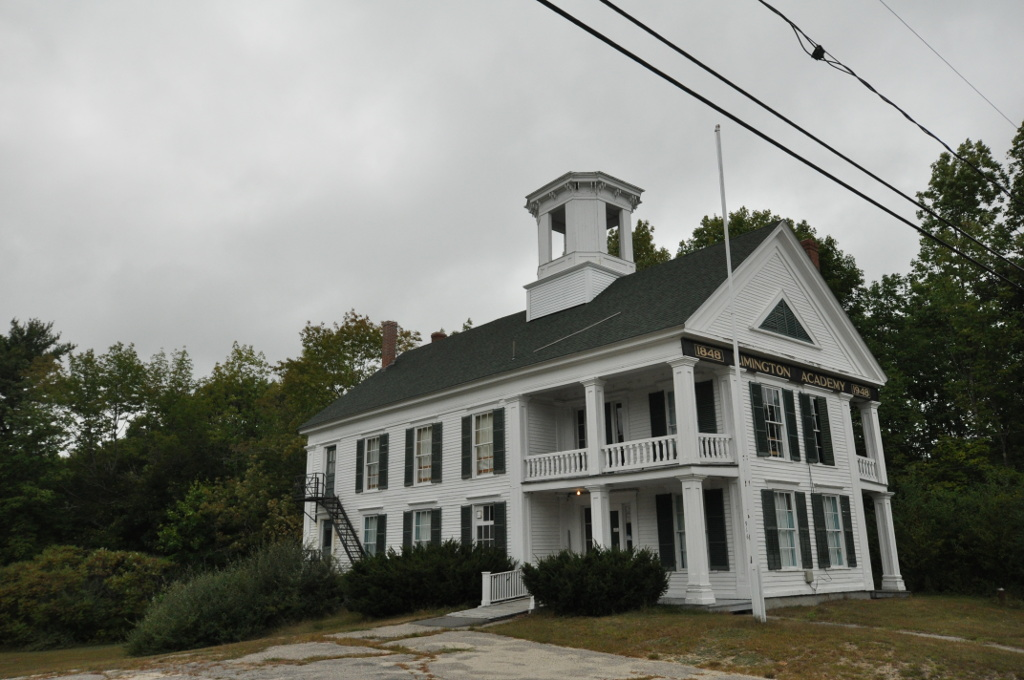

- Location within Maine Location within the United States
- Location: ME 117, Limington, Maine
- Coordinates: 43°43′48″N 70°42′36″W
- Area: 0.5 acres (0.20 ha)
- Built: 1854
- Architectural style: Greek Revival
- NRHP reference No.: 80000380
- Added to NRHP: June 23, 1980

Limington Academy is a historic private academy building on Maine State Route 117 in the center of Limington, Maine. The Academy was founded in 1848, and the Greek Revival style building was completed in 1854. The building, still owned by the academy trustees, is still used for educational purposes. It was listed on the National Register of Historic Places in 1980.

== Description and history ==
The Limington Academy building is set on the west side Cape Road (SR 117), a short way south of its junction with Maine State Route 11, which marks the center of the rural community. It is a two-story wood frame structure, with clapboard siding, granite foundation, and a gabled roof topped by an octagonal cupola. The east-facing front facade is four bays wide, with the outer bays taken up by recessed porches that extend for two bays along the sides. The porches are supported by paneled square posts, details repeated in pilasters at the building corners. The front gable is fully pedimented, with a triangular louvered fan at its center.

Limington Academy was founded in 1848 as a subscription school. The primary founders were Dr. Samuel M. Bradbury, Rev. J H. Garmon, Arthur McArthur, Esq., James McArthur, Gideon L. Moody, and Isaac L. Mitchell. William G. Lord headed the school from 1851 to 1894. Originally, there were no grades and students attended until they were prepared for college or work. The school met in one of the village school buildings, and then in Masonic hall, before this building was constructed in 1854. By the end of the 19th century the school had reached its height, drawing students from nearby towns. In 1895 the school became the de facto public high school for the area. The academy is now defunct, but the trustees still own the building and the local public schools rent space there for elementary school classes.

== See also ==
- National Register of Historic Places listings in York County, Maine
