= Paine Neighborhood Historic District =

Historic district in Maine, United States

- U.S. National Register of Historic Places
- U.S. Historic district
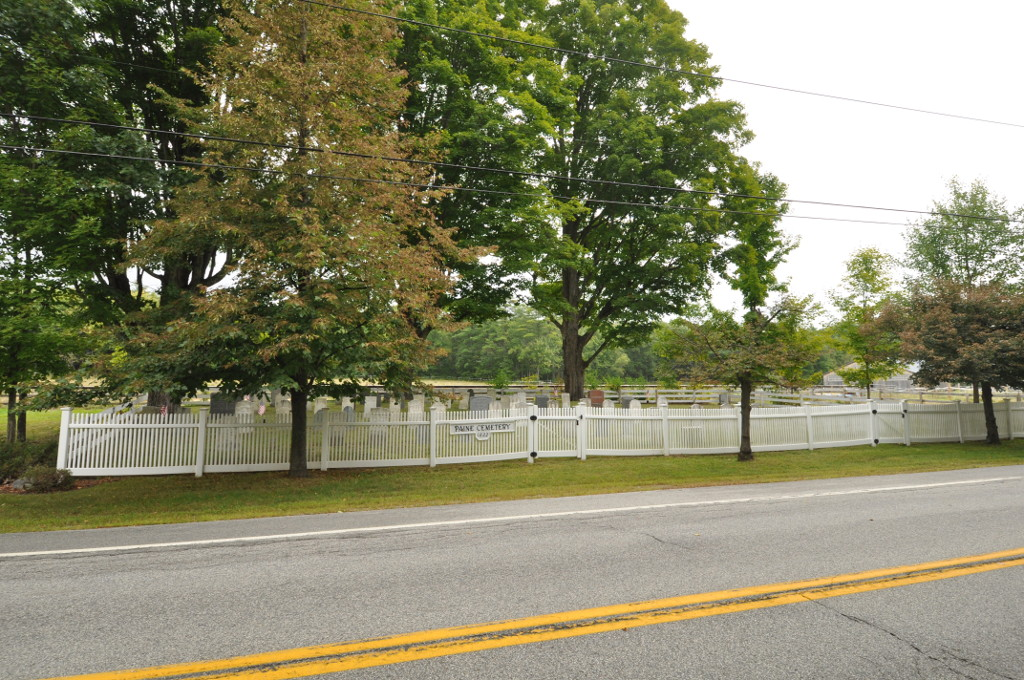
- The Paine family cemetery

- Location within Maine Location within the United States
- Location: ME 113, Standish, Maine
- Coordinates: 43°44′27″N 70°36′5″W
- Area: 14 acres (5.7 ha)
- Built: 1795
- Architect: Multiple
- NRHP reference No.: 85000731
- Added to NRHP: April 11, 1985

The Paine Neighborhood Historic District of Standish, Maine encompasses a small collection of rural properties that were all developed within a short period of time by members of the Paine family. Included are three late 18th-century houses and the family cemetery. The area provides a view of early settlement patterns in Maine's interior. The district was listed on the National Register of Historic Places in 1985.

== Description and history ==
In about 1780 four Paine brothers left Eastham, Massachusetts, and settled in the area that is now Gorham and Standish, Maine. One of them, Joseph, settled on the Pequawket Trail (now Maine State Route 113), the major historic route from coastal southern Maine to the Fryeburg area, on the northeast side of Watchic Pond. Although his early home no longer stands, four sons all built houses in the 1790s, three of which still stand along Route 113, along with the family cemetery.

The family cemetery is located on the north side of Route 113. To its east stands the house of Myrick Paine, a two-story wood frame structure with a hip roof and four chimneys. To its west is that of Richard Paine, a 1-1/2 story Cape style house with an attached single-story wing. South of the road, roughly opposite Richard's house, is the house of Joseph Paine, Jr. It is similar to Richard's, except that it is connected to a barn. All three houses were built 1795–97, and remained in the hands of Paine descendants into the 20th century.

== See also ==
- National Register of Historic Places listings in Cumberland County, Maine
