= Limerick Upper Village Historic District =

Historic district in Maine, United States

- U.S. National Register of Historic Places
- U.S. Historic district
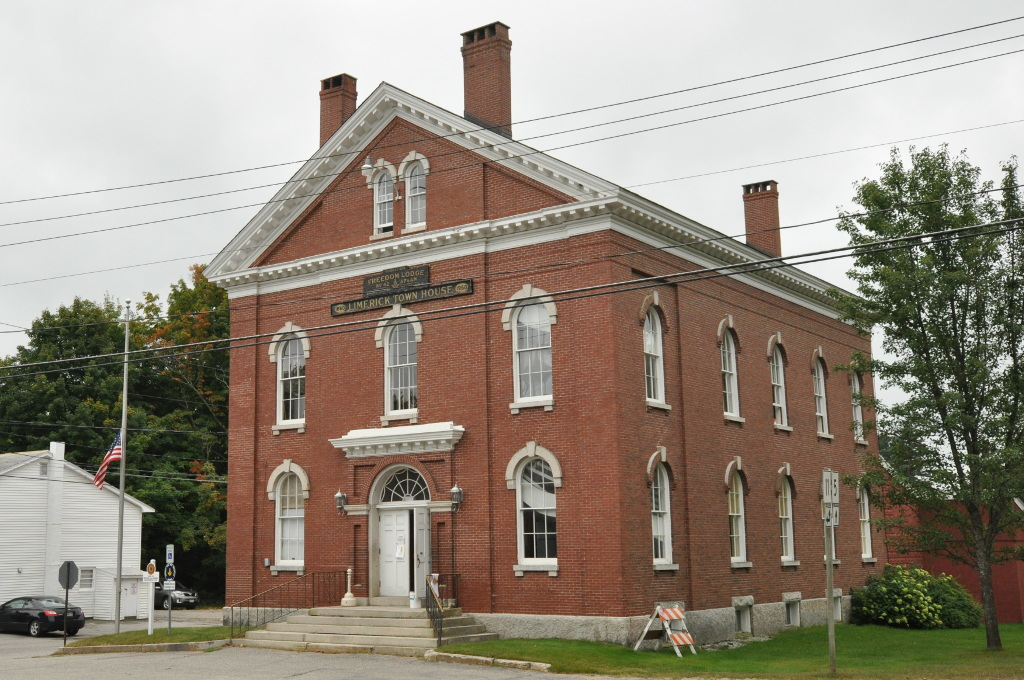
- Limerick Town Hall (built 1860)

- Location within Maine Location within the United States
- Location: ME 5, Limerick, Maine
- Coordinates: 43°41′17″N 70°47′43″W
- Area: 11 acres (4.5 ha)
- Architectural style: Greek Revival, Italianate, Federal
- NRHP reference No.: 84001557
- Added to NRHP: April 5, 1984

The Limerick Upper Village Historic District encompasses the historic village center of Limerick, Maine. The 11-acre (4.5 ha) district extends along Main Street roughly from the southern junction of Maine State Routes 11 and 5 to the northern junction of Routes 5 and 160, and was developed between the turn of the 19th century and the early 20th century. It was listed on the National Register of Historic Places in 1984.

== Description and history ==
The town of Limerick was first settled in the 1770s, and was incorporated in 1787. It was named for the Irish city of Limerick, the place of origin of the father of James Sullivan, a prominent lawyer of southern Maine and one of the town's founders. What is now Main Street (and more generally SR 5) had its origin as a Native American footpath running from the coast to the inland community of Pequawket, now Fryeburg, Maine. Set on a rise at the southern end of the district is the 1852 Baptist church, adjacent to which are the town's oldest cemeteries. The village is arrayed along Main Street between this area and the 1822 Freewill Baptist Church, set at the triangular junction of Routes 5 and 160.

The oldest building in the district is the c. 1790 Rev. Eastman House, a Federal period building that was restyled in the 1870s with Italianate trim. The c. 1800 Kilpatrick House has retained its Federal appearance. Italianate buildings predominate in the district, including the brick town hall (1860), the academy (1881), and the library (1881). The Jeremiah Mason House (1859) is a particularly fine example of Italianate residential architecture executed in brick. There is only one Queen Anne period building in the district: the Limerick National Bank building (1881).

== See also ==
- National Register of Historic Places listings in York County, Maine
