= Carol Noonan =

American singer

Carol Noonan is an American folk singer/songwriter from Maine. She began her career as the lead singer and songwriter for the band Knots and Crosses. "Knots and Crosses" was formed in the late 1980s by Noonan (vocals, guitar), Alan Williams (keyboards, vocals) and Rick Harris (guitar, vocals); all were students at the New England Conservatory of Music at one time. They built a significant following around Boston and the New England area. After a major-label bidding war led to a failed deal with Island Records, the group disbanded.

Noonan went on to do three solo albums for the Philo/Rounder label through 1997. The "Carol Noonan Band" featured Duke Levine and Kevin Barry on guitars. They have stayed with her for most of her live performances over the years as well as all her albums. Since her time with Rounder she has released a number of albums on her own label carolnoonanmusic.com. An NPR darling for her music, she has also been a guest essayist on Weekend Edition, and was included on one of their Driveway Moments compilations.

She is married to a commercial fishing net builder Jeff Flagg; together they run the Stone Mountain Arts Center, a music hall behind their house in Brownfield, Maine.

== Discography ==
- Creatures of Habit (w/ Knots and Crosses)
- Curve of the Earth (w/ Knots and Crosses)
- There Was A Time (w/ Knots and Crosses)
- Absolution
- Noonan Building and Wrecking ( 1996 )
- The Only Witness ( 1997 )
- Carol Noonan ( 1999 )
- Big Iron
- Carol Noonan Christmas
- Somebody's Darling .......Songs, of War, Loss and Remembrance
- As Tears Go By
- Waltzing's for Dreamers
