= Bridgton Academy =

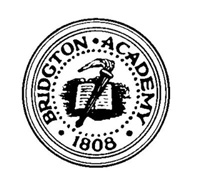
- Bridgton Academy's Seal

Location
- North Bridgton, Maine 04057; United States
- Coordinates: 44°05′59″N 70°42′02″W

Information
- Motto: The Year That Makes The Difference
- Established: 1808
- Dean: Jamie Izaryk
- Head of School: Diana Gleeson
- Staff: 65
- Teaching staff: 40
- Grades: Post Graduate Year
- Gender: Male
- Age range: 18-20
  - Grade 12: 5-10
  - Grade 13: 155
- Average class size: 12:1
- Campus size: 55-acre
- Colors: Black, white, and grey
- Sports: Football, soccer, golf, basketball, hockey, skiing, baseball, and lacrosse
- Mascot: Wolverine
- Accreditation: NEASC
- Publication: BA Today (Biannual)
- Yearbook: The Stranger
- Website: www.bridgtonacademy.org

Bridgton Academy is an all-male college preparatory school in Bridgton, Maine. Founded in 1808, the school is located at the northern tip of Long Lake in North Bridgton, Maine. The school has been NEASC-accredited since 1934, making it one of the oldest accredited schools in the country. The school is also a member of the National Association of Independent Schools.

The 55-acre (22 ha) campus holds 24 buildings. The majority of classes are held in the new Humanities Center. There are seven dormitories on campus ranging in capacity from 18-55 students. In recent history, the school has expanded its number of two-year students, allowing for students to complete their high school diploma at Bridgton, as well as spending their second, prep, year at the Academy. While women were historically part of the student body and a dormitory was opened to them in 1909, the academy does not currently admit women as students.

== Alumni ==
- Fardaws Aimaq – basketball player
- Clarence Black – media personality
- Steven Brooks – Syracuse lacrosse two-time national championship player
- Victor Cruz – American football wide receiver
- Amir Garrett – baseball player
- Courtney Greene – American football defensive back
- Andrew Haldane – United States Marine Corps officer
- Simon M. Hamlin – U.S. Representative from Maine (1935–1937)
- Edward H. Hill – surgeon, founder of Central Maine Medical Center
- Paris Horne – basketball player
- Althea G. Quimby – president, Women's Christian Temperance Union of Maine
- Thomas Treadwell Stone – Unitarian pastor and abolitionist
- Larry Turner – basketball player
- Robert Vaden – basketball player
- Harold W. Wells – mayor of Somerville, Massachusetts (1960–1962)
- Jermaine Wiggins – American football tight end

== See also ==
- Education in Maine
