= Althea G. Quimby =

American temperance leader (1858–1942)

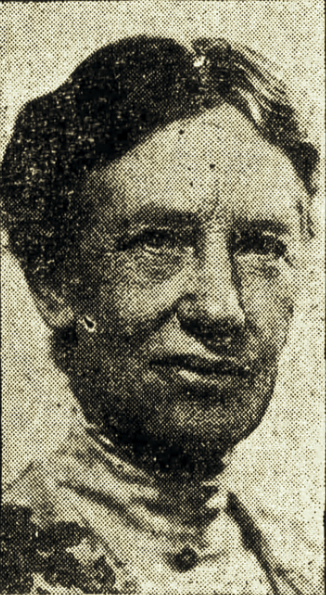
- Althea G. Quimby in 1922
- Born: Althea Gould Coffin; August 26, 1858; Norway, Maine, U.S.
- Died: July 9, 1942 (aged 83); Lewiston, Maine, U.S.
- Spouse: J. Frank Quimby (m. 1884; died 1940)
- Children: 3

Althea Gould Quimby (née Coffin; August 26, 1858 – July 9, 1942) was an American temperance activist who served for 25 years as the president of the Woman's Christian Temperance Union (WCTU) of the State of Maine (1914–1939). In 1927, she became a National WCTU vice president. For 20 years, Quimby was a lay preacher in the Methodist Episcopal Church.

== Early life and education ==
Althea Gould Coffin was born in Norway, Maine, August 26, 1858. Her parents were Daniel (1818–1899) and Sarah S. (Collins) Coffin (1814–1877). Althea had two older siblings: Mary (1850–1894) and Clarence (1852–1873).

She was educated in Auburn, Maine at the Hebron Academy, and graduated from the Bridgton Academy, in Bridgton, Maine, in 1880. She was also a special student at Bates College, 1880–1881.

== Career ==
Quimby taught elocution and elementary studies in Auburn and Turner, Maine, for ten years, and at the Bridgton Academy for two years.

She was a teacher and superintendent in Sunday schools, and was active in church work. For many years, she was the president of the Church Ladies' Aid. For 20 years, she served as a lay preacher (local preacher without charge) in the Methodist Episcopal Church.

Quimby was connected with various temperance reforms, especially the WCTU. She served as president of the Androscoggin County, Maine, WCTU; vice-president of the State of Maine WCTU; and, for 25 years, she served as the president of the State of Maine WCTU (1914–39). In 1927, she became a National WCTU vice president. Quimby was a delegate several times to national conventions of the WCTU. She also attended several World WCTU conventions, including the one in Tremont Temple, Boston, in 1904.

In 1922, she served as one of two Androscoggin County delegates at the Republican State Convention.

== Personal life ==
On May 18, 1884, in Auburn, she married Hon. J. Frank Quimby (died 1940). They had three sons: Israel Leroy, Clarence Paul, and Frank Brooks Quimby.

She favored woman's suffrage.

Althea G. Quimby died July 9, 1942, in Lewiston, Maine, at the age of 83.
