= Norway, Maine =

Town in Maine, United States

- Town
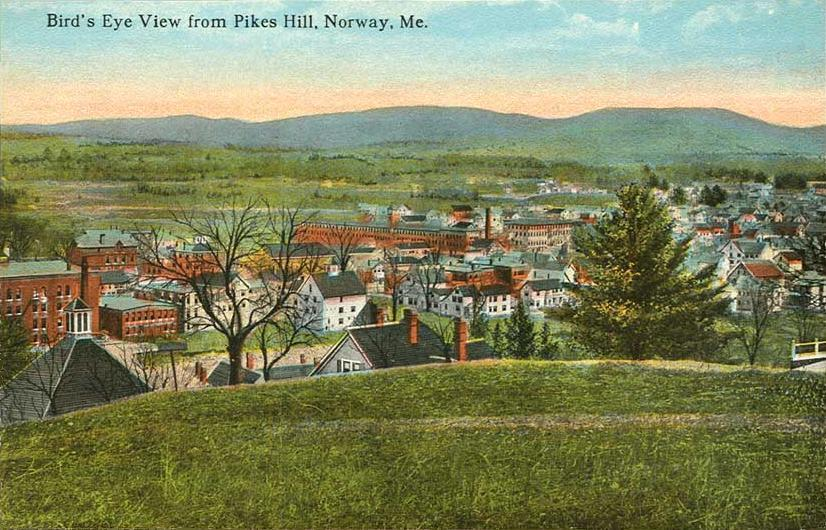
- Bird's-eye view from Pikes Hill c. 1912

- Location within Maine Location within the United States
- Coordinates: 44°15′12″N 70°37′32″W
- Country: United States
- State: Maine
- County: Oxford

Area
  - Total: 47.33 sq mi (122.58 km^{2})
  - Land: 45.04 sq mi (116.65 km^{2})
  - Water: 2.29 sq mi (5.93 km^{2})
- Elevation: 577 ft (176 m)

Population (2020)
  - Total: 5,077
  - Density: 113/sq mi (43.5/km^{2})
- Time zone: UTC−05:00 (Eastern (EST))
  - Summer (DST): UTC−04:00 (EDT)
- ZIP Code: 04268
- Area code: 207
- GNIS feature ID: 582643
- Website: norwaymaine.com

Norway is a town in Oxford County, Maine, United States. Norway was included in the Lewiston-Auburn, Maine metropolitan New England City and Town Area. The population was 5,077 at the 2020 census. The town contains the census-designated place of the same name. It is home to Pennesseewassee Lake, a freshwater lake and recreation area.

== History ==
Fertile soil and abundant fauna surrounding the Pennessewasse Lake supported native people in the region for thousands of years. It wasn't until after the American Revolution that European settlers established the town of Norway.

In 1786, Joseph Stevens, George Leslie, Amos Hobbs, Jeremiah Hobbs, Jonas Stevens, and Nathaniel Stevens began clearing land and building homes. They intended to not only provide for their families, but also attract new settlers to their small community. Many of the early settlers had fought in the Revolutionary War, including Phineas Whitney, a veteran of the Battle of Bunker Hill.

By 1789, a sawmill and gristmill were established, the first road was built in 1796, and the town of Norway was officially incorporated on March 9, 1797. Before incorporation, the township adopted the name Rustfield, to recognize the contributions of prominent landowner Henry Rust of Salem, Massachusetts, and the community once petitioned the Massachusetts General Court to be named Norage, meaning "falls" in the native peoples' language. According to A Gazetteer of the State of Maine, the name of Norway was finally chosen to honor persons from Norway, in Scandinavia.

During the Civil War, Norway and other municipalities in Oxford County formed a militia that joined the 1st Maine Volunteer Infantry Regiment under the command of George Lafayette Beal. Beal would later rise to the rank of major general and serve as State Treasurer from 1888 to 1894.

With fertile soil for cultivation and access to the Pennesseewassee waterways, which drain into the Little Androscoggin River, the community had ample water power to drive industrial manufacturing, including a cloth and carding mill, a furniture factory, a box factory, and a shovel handle factory. Waterfalls powered two grain mills. Businesses like a tannery, a harness maker, and a trunk manufacturer emerged. Shoe manufactory was established in 1872.

The busy stage route from Paris, the county seat, to Fryeburg passed through Norway. By 1878, there were 32 stores in the town. For a number of years, Norway had the fastest growing population of any similar town in the state.

On December 30, 1879, the Norway Branch Railroad opened. The 1.45 mile (2.3 km) line connected Norway village with the Atlantic and St. Lawrence Railroad (later Grand Trunk Railroad) at South Paris. On May 9, 1894, a fire sparked in the C. B. Cummings & Sons mill on Main Street. Spread by a strong wind, what would become known as The Great Norway Fire, destroyed a substantial portion of the business district, devastating the opera house, Congregational Church, tannery, and 80 other buildings, including many homes. Reconstruction began the same year, and many of the original wooden buildings on Main Street were rebuilt with brick.

Norway was known variously as the "Snowshoe Capital of the World" and the "Snowshoe Town of America" due to the town's influential snowshoe manufacturers. A. M. Dunham began making snowshoes there in 1878 and eventually supplied users across North America. In Secrets of Polar Travel, explorer Robert Peary extolled their virtures, calling them "the best snow-shoes [he] ever saw". Similarly, Walter Tubbs founded the Tubbs Snowshoe Company 1906. Tubbs produced high quality ash snowshoes, skis, sleds, and furniture, even supplying Byrd's polar expeditions. Tubbs relocated to Vermont in the early 1930s. Soon after, SnoCraft Inc., a company owned and operated by Kenneth (Kac) Aldrich, set up production in the old Tubbs Factory. SnoCraft was responsible for supplying 70% of the snowshoes ordered by the U.S. government during World War II.

Founded in 1850, the C. B. Cummings & Son Company mass-produced wooden components like dowels in downtown Norway. In 2001, after domestic furniture manufacturers were unable to compete with production costs in China, the company closed and auctioned their factory. Similarly, after K2 Sports bought Tubbs Snowshoe Company in 2014, production moved from Vermont to Guangzhou, China.

In 1997, the New Balance Shoe Company built a manufacturing facility in Norway where production continues today.

=== Image gallery ===
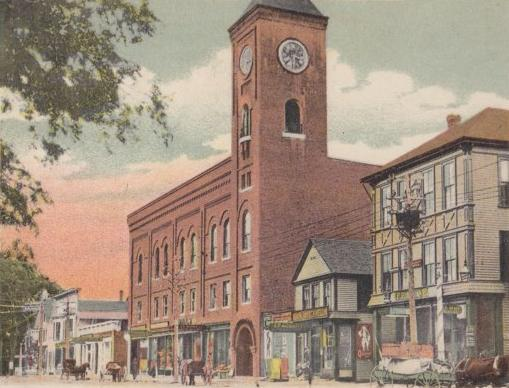
Opera House in 1906

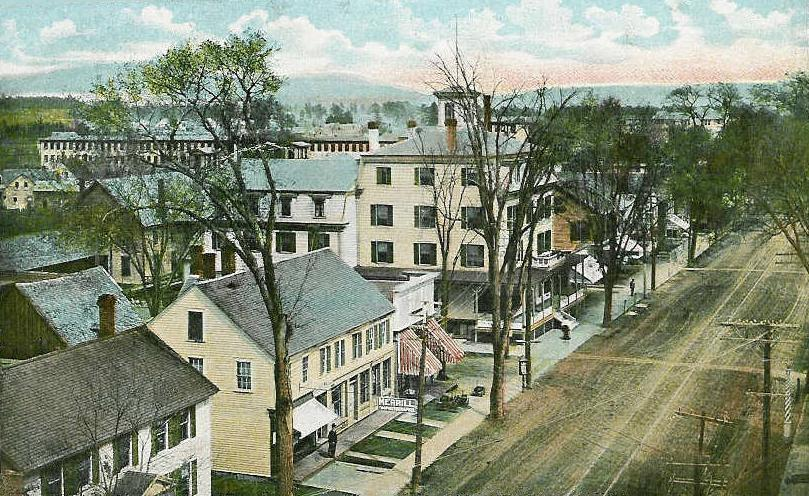
Main Street in 1908

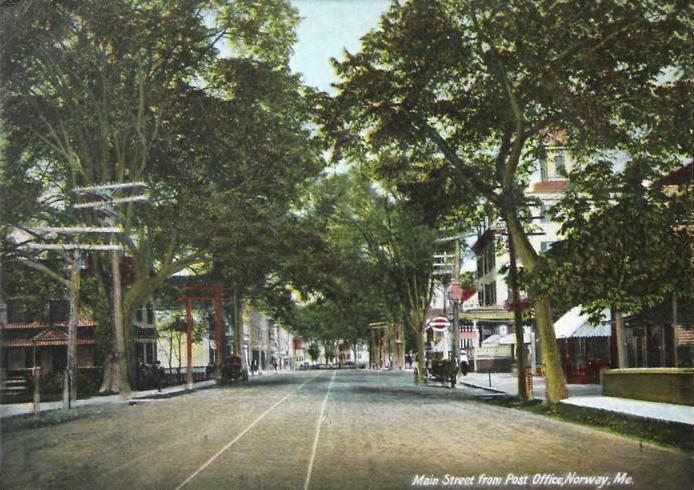
Downtown in 1907

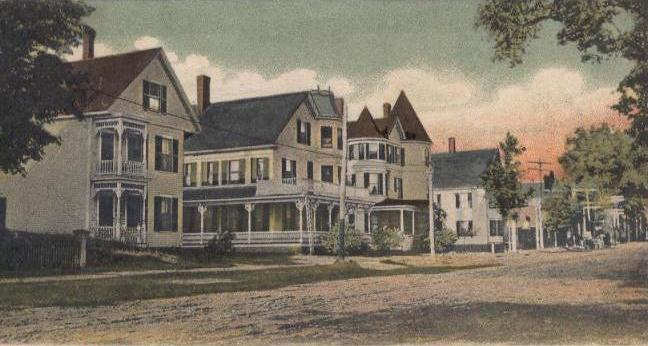
Street scene in 1906

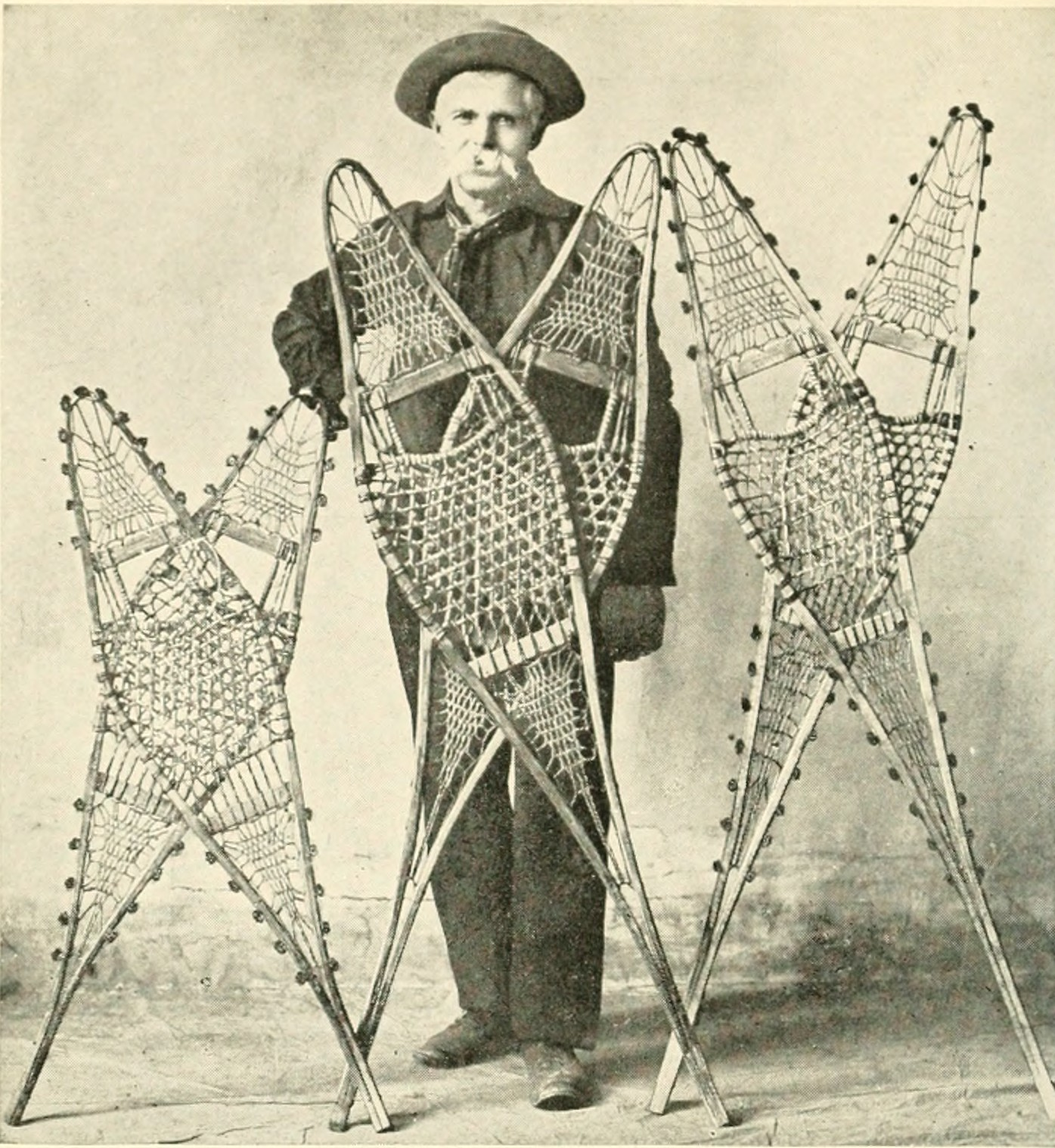
Original caption: "The center pair of [Dunham's snow] shoes... is the best shoe made" (Peary's Secrets of Polar Travel).

== Municipal ==
Norway is in School Administrative District (SAD) 17. Children attend Rowe Elementary School from pre-kindergarten to grade 6. Older students attend Oxford Hills middle school and Oxford Hills Comprehensive High School.

Norway has a water district and a waste water treatment facility. The town is administered by a board of selectmen. The town has a planning board.

== Geography ==
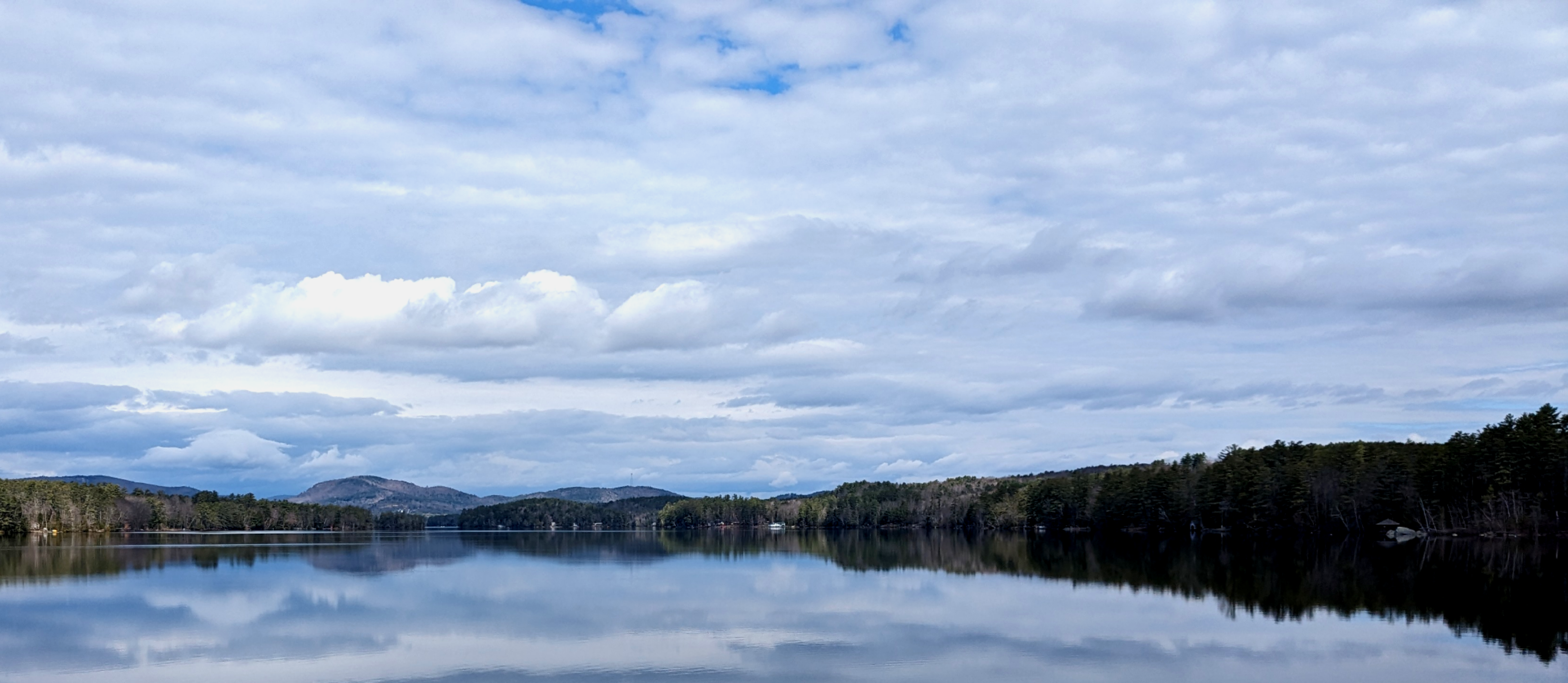
Pennesseewassee Lake

According to the United States Census Bureau, the town has a total area of 47.33 square miles (122.58 km^{2}), of which 45.04 square miles (116.65 km^{2}) is land and 2.29 square miles (5.93 km^{2}) is water. Norway is drained by the Pennesseewassee Stream and Little Androscoggin River.

The town is crossed by state routes 26, 117 and 118. It borders the towns of Greenwood and West Paris to the north; Paris to the east; Oxford to the southeast; Otisfield to the south; Harrison to the southwest; Waterford to the west; and Albany to the northwest.

=== Climate ===
This climatic region is typified by large seasonal temperature differences, with warm to hot (and often humid) summers and cold (sometimes severely cold) winters. According to the Köppen Climate Classification system, Norway has a humid continental climate, abbreviated "Dfb" on climate maps.

== Demographics ==
Historical population
Census	Pop.	Note	%±
1800	609		—
1810	1,010		65.8%
1820	1,294		28.1%
1830	1,713		32.4%
1840	1,786		4.3%
1850	1,963		9.9%
1860	1,982		1.0%
1870	1,954		−1.4%
1880	2,519		28.9%
1890	2,665		5.8%
1900	2,902		8.9%
1910	3,002		3.4%
1920	2,969		−1.1%
1930	3,145		5.9%
1940	3,649		16.0%
1950	3,811		4.4%
1960	3,733		−2.0%
1970	3,595		−3.7%
1980	4,042		12.4%
1990	4,754		17.6%
2000	4,611		−3.0%
2010	5,014		8.7%
2020	5,077		1.3%
U.S. Decennial Census

=== 2010 census ===
As of the census of 2010, there were 5,014 people, 2,163 households, and 1,357 families living in the town. The population density was 111.3 inhabitants per square mile (43.0/km^{2}). There were 2,804 housing units at an average density of 62.3 per square mile (24.1/km^{2}). The racial makeup of the town was 96.1% White; 0.4% African American; 0.6% Native American; 0.6% Asian; 0.1% Pacific Islander; 0.1% from other races; and 2.3% from two or more races. Hispanic or Latino of any race were 1.0% of the population.

Of 2,163 households, 27.8% had children under the age of 18 living with them; 44.0% were married couples living together; 13.3% had an unmarried female head of household; 5.5% had an unmarried male head of household; and 37.3% were non-families. Of all households, 28.7% were made up of individuals, where 13.5% of individuals over 65 years of age lived alone. The average household size was 2.28 people and the average family size was 2.75.

The median age in the town was 44.4 years. 21.4% of residents were under the age of 18; 6.9% were 18 to 24; 22.5% were 25 to 44; 29.3% were 45 to 64; and 20.1% were 65 years of age or older. The gender makeup of the town was 48.5% male and 51.5% female.

=== 2000 census ===
Per the census of 2000, there were 4,611 people, 1,972 households, and 1,256 families living in the town.

The median income per household in the town was $28,497. The median income for a family was $34,464. The income per capita was $17,020, where males had a median income of $26,612, and annual income for females was $20,417. About 9.8% of families and 12.7% of the overall population's income was below the poverty line. Of those below the poverty line, 16.1% were under the age of 18, and 10.1% were 65 or older.

== Stereographic cards of Norway ==
Photographer W. H. Green created several stereographic cards of the town and surrounding Oxford County.

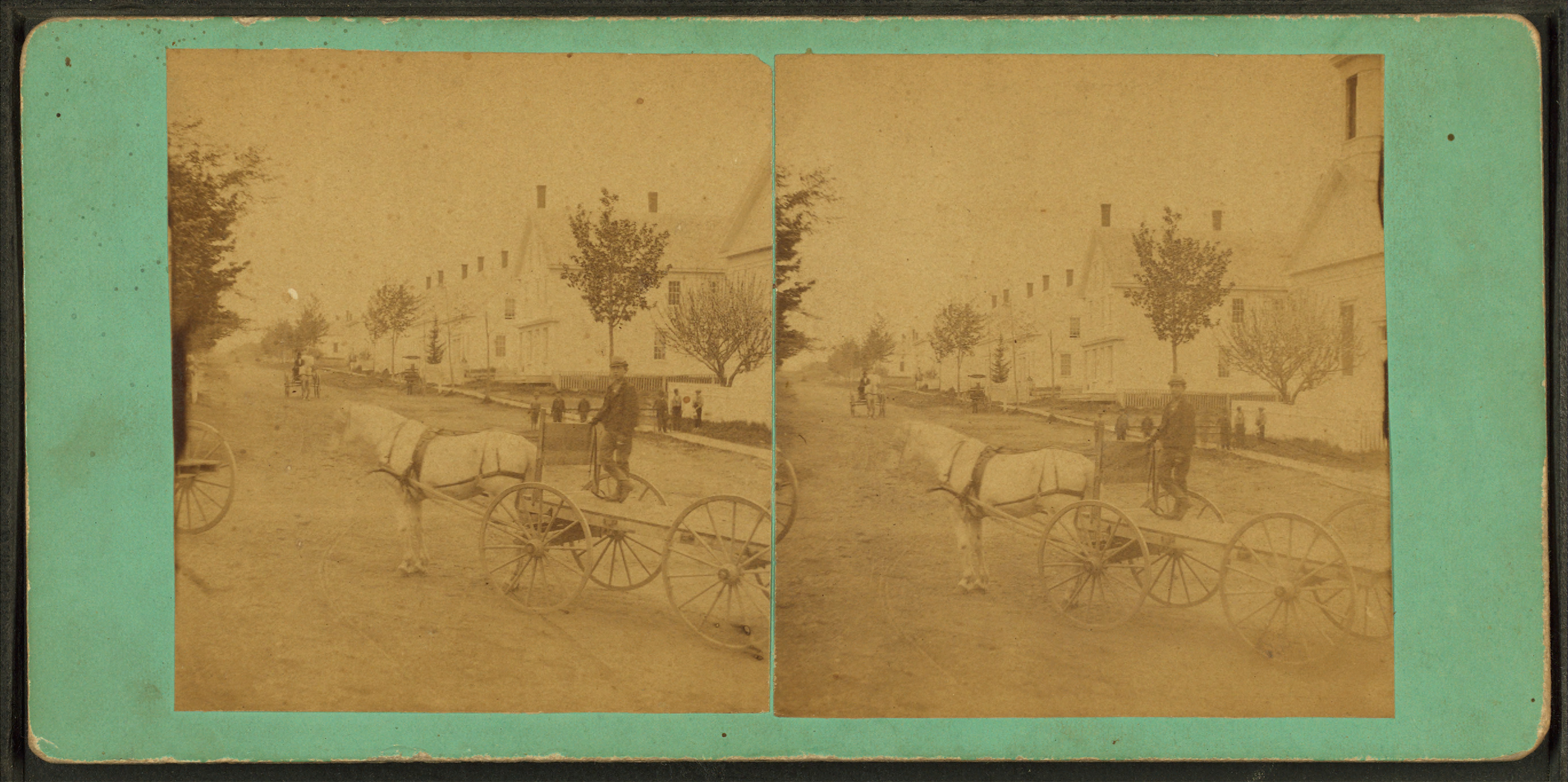
Horse pulling cart

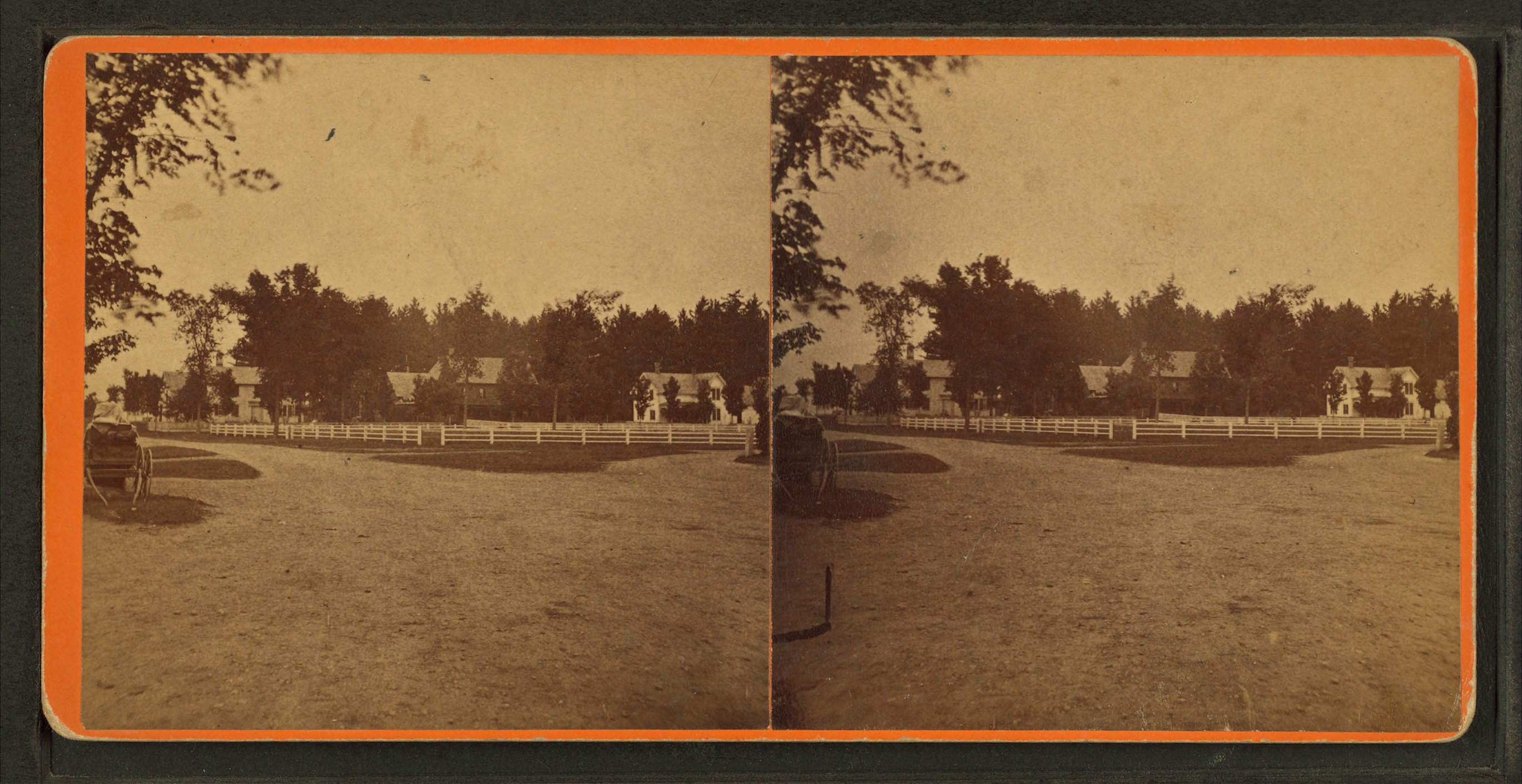
Streets of Norway

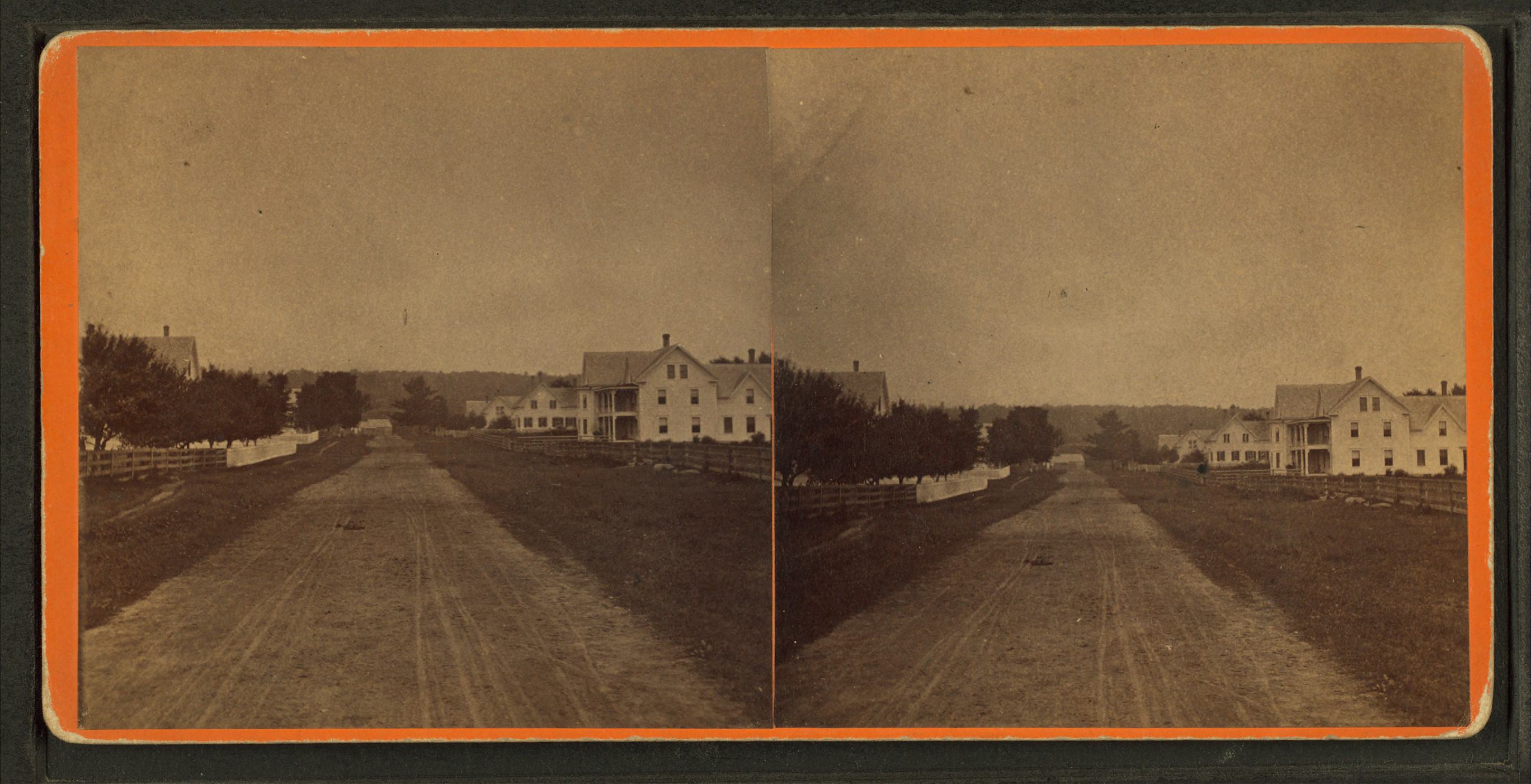
Street view

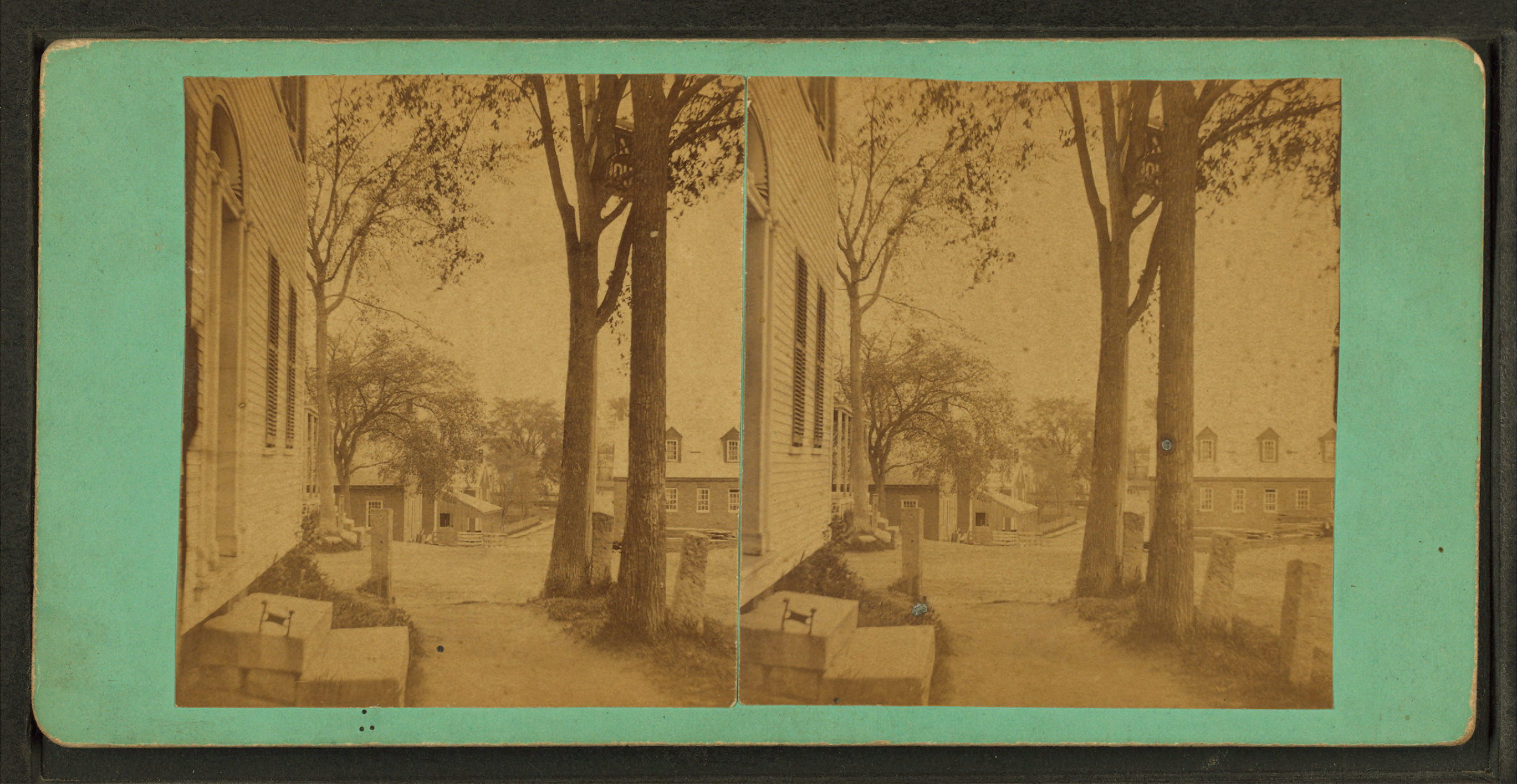
Norway dwellings

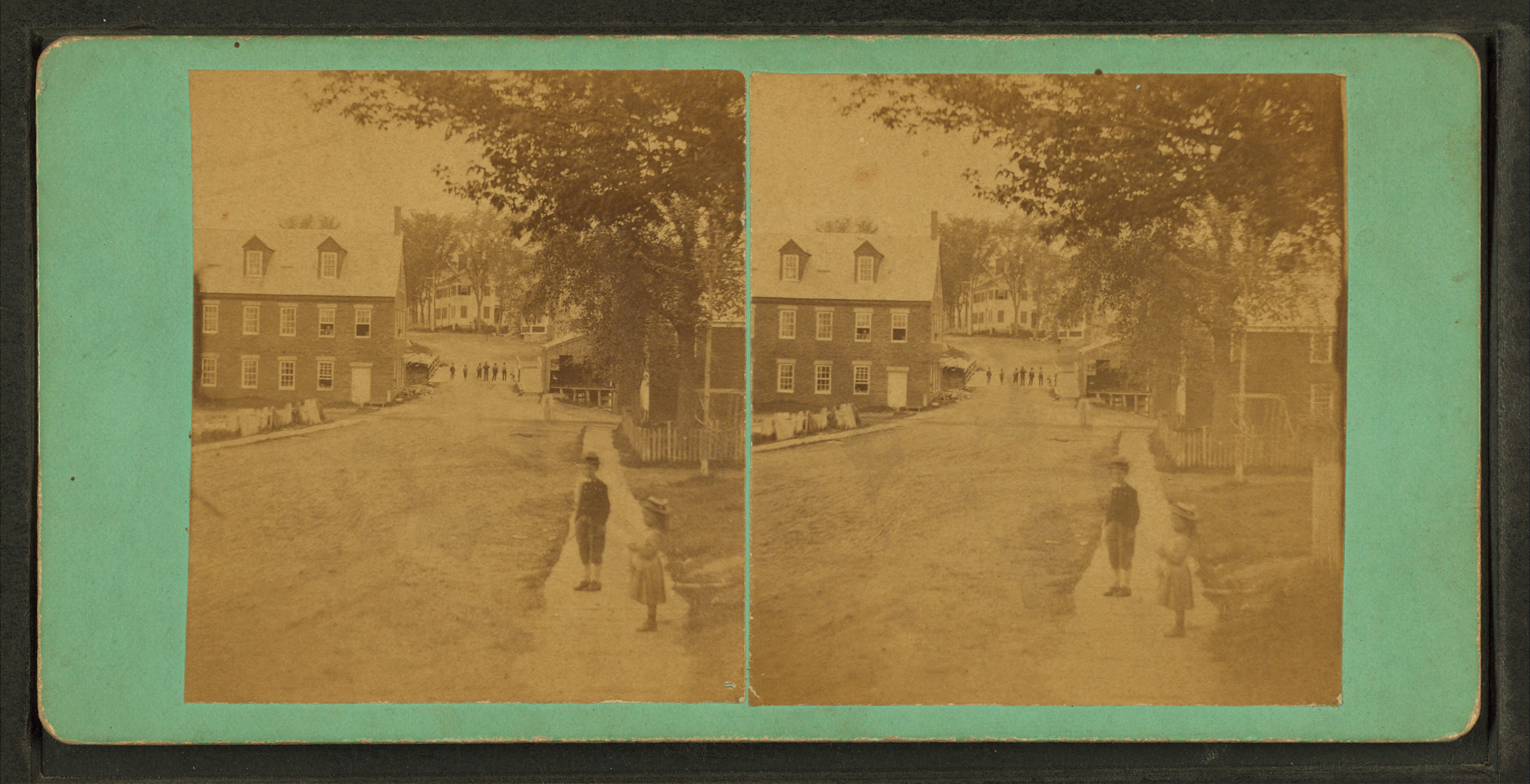
Dwellings and streets

== Sites of interest ==
- Norway Historical Society & Museum
- Historical Walking Tour of Norway, Maine

== Notable people ==
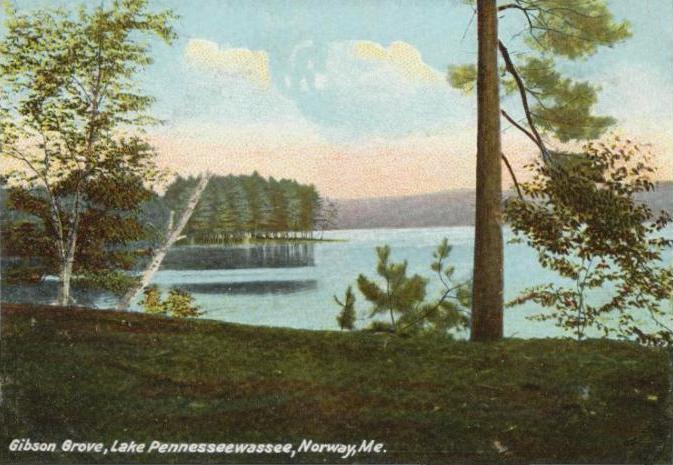
Lake Pennesseewassee in 1906

- George Lafayette Beal, Civil War era general, state treasurer
- Mellie Dunham, fiddler, snowshoe maker
- Marsden Hartley, American painter
- Marshall Kirk, genealogist, writer
- Henry Rust Mighels, journalist, politician
- Talbot Mundy, author
- George Lorenzo Noyes, naturalist, writer, artist
- Donald B. Partridge, U.S. Representative
- Althea G. Quimby, president, Woman's Christian Temperance Union of Maine
- Don Carlos Seitz, author, journalist
- C. A. Stephens, writer
