= Oxford (CDP), Maine =

Oxford, Maine
- Census-designated place
- Location within Maine Location within the United States
- Coordinates: 44°07′38″N 70°30′05″W
- Country: United States
- State: Maine
- County: Oxford

Area
  - Total: 8.95 sq mi (23.17 km^{2})
  - Land: 8.29 sq mi (21.47 km^{2})
  - Water: 0.66 sq mi (1.70 km^{2})
- Elevation: 656 ft (200 m)

Population (2020)
  - Total: 1,294
  - Density: 156.1/sq mi (60.28/km^{2})
- Time zone: UTC-5 (Eastern (EST))
  - Summer (DST): UTC-4 (EDT)
- ZIP code: 04270
- Area code: 207
- FIPS code: 23-56240
- GNIS feature ID: 2377948

Oxford is a census-designated place (CDP) in the town of Oxford in Oxford County, Maine, United States. The population was 1,300 at the 2000 census.

== Geography ==
According to the United States Census Bureau, the CDP has a total area of 8.9 square miles (23.2 km^{2}), of which 8.3 square miles (21.4 km^{2}) is land and 0.7 square mile (1.7 km^{2}) (7.49%) is water.

== Demographics ==
Historical population
| Census | Pop. | Note | %± |
|---|---|---|---|
| 2020 | 1,294 | | — |
U.S. Decennial Census

As of the census of 2000, there were 1,300 people, 468 households, and 360 families residing in the CDP. The population density was 157.3 inhabitants per square mile (60.7/km^{2}). There were 620 housing units at an average density of 75.0 per square mile (29.0/km^{2}). The racial makeup of the CDP was 97.46% White, 0.15% Black or African American, 0.31% Native American, 0.46% Asian, 0.08% Pacific Islander, 0.23% from other races, and 1.31% from two or more races. Hispanic or Latino of any race were 0.15% of the population.

There were 468 households, out of which 40.2% had children under the age of 18 living with them, 59.2% were married couples living together, 12.4% had a female householder with no husband present, and 22.9% were non-families. 17.1% of all households were made up of individuals, and 6.8% had someone living alone who was 65 years of age or older. The average household size was 2.78 and the average family size was 3.06.

In the CDP, the population was spread out, with 29.6% under the age of 18, 6.9% from 18 to 24, 29.3% from 25 to 44, 23.2% from 45 to 64, and 10.9% who were 65 years of age or older. The median age was 36 years. For every 100 females, there were 97.3 males. For every 100 females age 18 and over, there were 93.4 males.

The median income for a household in the CDP was $38,000, and the median income for a family was $40,592. Males had a median income of $30,203 versus $20,409 for females. The per capita income for the CDP was $14,567. About 2.1% of families and 5.7% of the population were below the poverty line, including 4.2% of those under age 18 and 10.8% of those age 65 or over.
