= Stone Mountain Arts Center =

Coordinates: 43°54′28″N 70°56′41″W

Stone Mountain Arts Center (SMAC), located in Brownfield, Maine, is an intimate performance hall situated in the foothills of the White Mountains. Despite its small size and remote location, artists who have performed there include Richie Havens, The Indigo Girls, Bela Fleck and the Flecktones, Martin Sexton, Marty Stuart, and Tom Rush, among others.

Folk singer/songwriter Carol Noonan owns and operates the center, along with her husband Jeff Flagg.

== Notability References ==
- Boston Sunday Globe, Arts & Entertainment - May 10, 2009
- Boston(WCVB)Chronicle - March 2009
- DownEast Magazine - April 2009
- Portland Magazine - April 2009
- Yankee Magazine, Editor's Choice Award 2009
