= Cornish (CDP), Maine =

Cornish, Maine
- Census-designated place
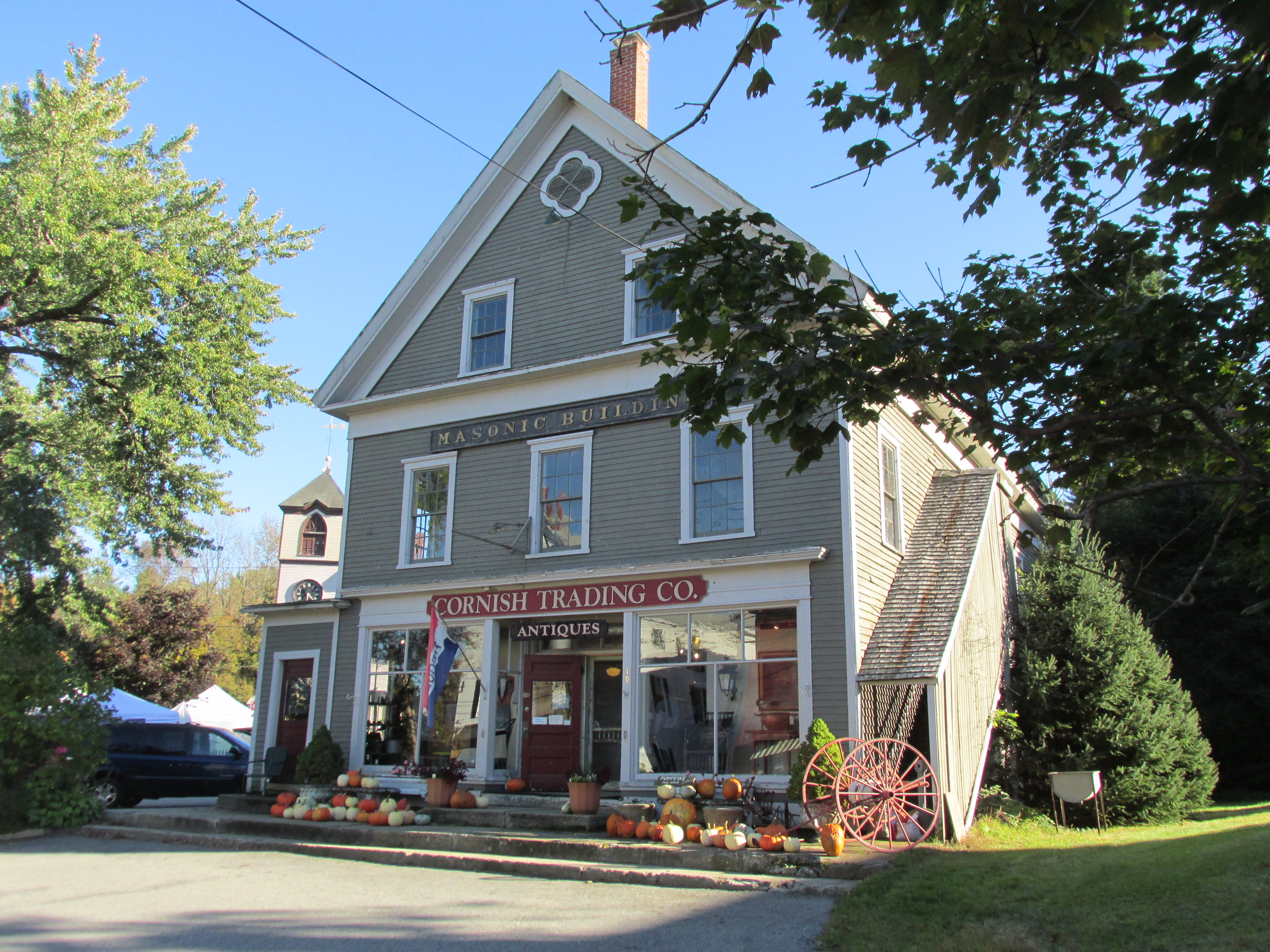
- Cornish Trading Co.

- Location within Maine Location within the United States
- Coordinates: 43°48′02″N 70°47′58″W
- Country: United States
- State: Maine
- County: York
- Town: Cornish

Area
  - Total: 3.11 sq mi (8.05 km^{2})
  - Land: 3.04 sq mi (7.87 km^{2})
  - Water: 0.069 sq mi (0.18 km^{2})
- Elevation: 446 ft (136 m)

Population (2020)
  - Total: 764
  - Density: 251.6/sq mi (97.13/km^{2})
- Time zone: UTC-5 (Eastern (EST))
  - Summer (DST): UTC-4 (EDT)
- ZIP Code: 04020
- Area code: 207
- FIPS code: 23-14450
- GNIS feature ID: 2806295

Cornish is a census-designated place (CDP) and the primary village in the town of Cornish, York County, Maine, United States. It is on the northern border of York County, on the south side of the Ossipee River where it joins the Saco. To the north, across the Ossipee, is the town of Hiram in Oxford County, and to the east, across the Saco, is the town of Baldwin in Cumberland County.

Maine State Route 25 passes through Cornish, leading southeast 21 miles (34 km) to Gorham and west 20 miles (32 km) to Center Ossipee, New Hampshire. State Route 5 leads south-southeast from Cornish 34 miles (55 km) to the city of Saco and north-northwest 20 miles (32 km) to Fryeburg.

Cornish was first listed as a CDP prior to the 2020 census.

== Demographics ==
Historical population
Census	Pop.	Note	%±
2020	764		—
U.S. Decennial Census
