= Brownfield, Maine =

Town in Maine, United States

- Town
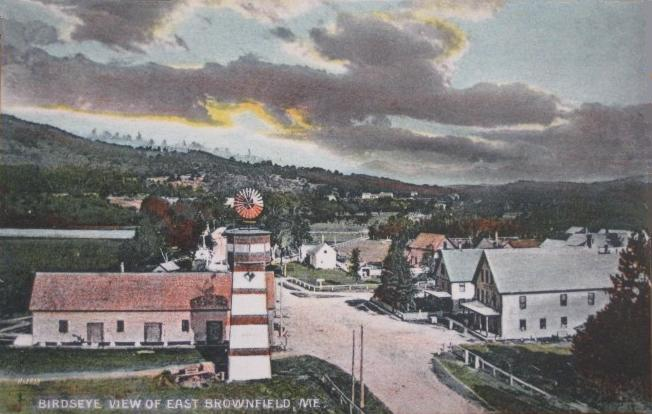
- East Brownfield in 1908

- Seal

- Location within Maine Location within the United States
- Coordinates: 43°58′19″N 70°54′02″W
- Country: United States
- State: Maine
- County: Oxford
- Incorporated: 1802

Area
  - Total: 45.45 sq mi (117.71 km^{2})
  - Land: 44.47 sq mi (115.18 km^{2})
  - Water: 0.98 sq mi (2.54 km^{2})
- Elevation: 676 ft (206 m)

Population (2020)
  - Total: 1,631
  - Density: 37/sq mi (14.2/km^{2})
- Time zone: UTC-5 (Eastern (EST))
  - Summer (DST): UTC-4 (EDT)
- ZIP code: 04010
- Area code: 207
- FIPS code: 23-08150
- GNIS feature ID: 582373
- Website: www.brownfieldmaine.gov

Brownfield is a town in Oxford County, Maine, United States. The population was 1,631 at the 2020 census. Brownfield is home to the Stone Mountain Arts Center.

== History ==
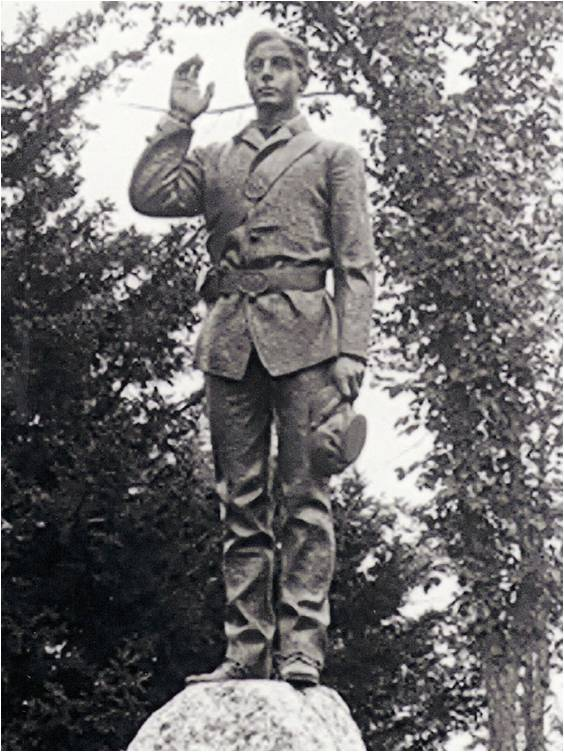
Union private Daniel A. Bean of Brownfield, Maine, 11th Maine Volunteer Infantry Regiment by Sculptor John Wilson

The area was once territory of the Pequawket Abenaki Indians, whose main village was located at what is today Fryeburg. It was granted on January 23, 1764, by the Massachusetts General Court to Captain Henry Young Brown for his services in the French and Indian Wars. Settlement began about 1765. Brown was required to settle 38 families by June 10, 1770, with a minister recruited by three years after that. Unfortunately, a portion of the original grant was found to lie in New Hampshire.

Replacement land in Maine was granted to Brown on June 25, 1766. It was called Brownfield Addition, one part of which now lies within Hiram and Denmark. The township was first organized as Brownfield Plantation, named in honor of its principal proprietor. On February 20, 1802, it was incorporated as Brownfield. By the War of 1812, it had nearly 900 residents.

Farming was the chief occupation, with the Saco River providing water power for industry. Products of the mills included flour, long lumber, barrel staves, rocking chairs, clothing, carriages, sleighs and harness. After the Civil War, the Portland and Ogdensburg Railroad passed through the town, following the general course of the river.

But the Great Fires of 1947 would destroy 85% of Brownfield. In an effort to replace lost commerce, a ski resort was proposed for Burnt Meadow Mountain. It opened in 1971 with a 3,400-foot (1,000 m) T-bar lift, but after being renamed Zodiac Skiway in 1980, closed in 1982. Today, the T-bars are still hanging in place.

In 2002, Brownfield celebrated its 200th anniversary.

== Geography ==
According to the United States Census Bureau, the town has a total area of 45.45 square miles (117.71 km^{2}), of which 44.47 square miles (115.18 km^{2}) is land and 0.98 square miles (2.54 km^{2}) is water. Situated beside the New Hampshire border, Brownfield is drained by the Saco River.

== Demographics ==
Historical population
Census	Pop.	Note	%±
1790	146		—
1800	287		96.6%
1810	388		35.2%
1820	747		92.5%
1830	936		25.3%
1840	1,360		45.3%
1850	1,320		−2.9%
1860	1,398		5.9%
1870	1,323		−5.4%
1880	1,229		−7.1%
1890	1,134		−7.7%
1900	1,019		−10.1%
1910	933		−8.4%
1920	835		−10.5%
1930	689		−17.5%
1940	741		7.5%
1950	612		−17.4%
1960	538		−12.1%
1970	478		−11.2%
1980	767		60.5%
1990	1,034		34.8%
2000	1,251		21.0%
2010	1,597		27.7%
2020	1,631		2.1%
U.S. Decennial Census

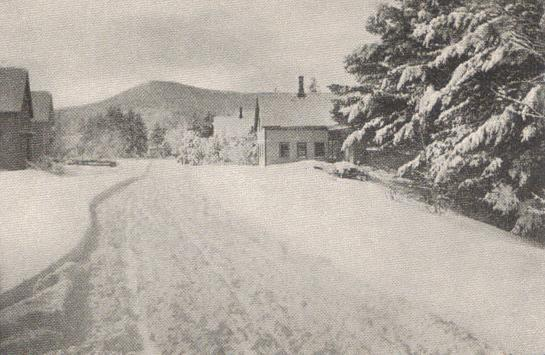
Burnt Meadow Mountain in winter c. 1905

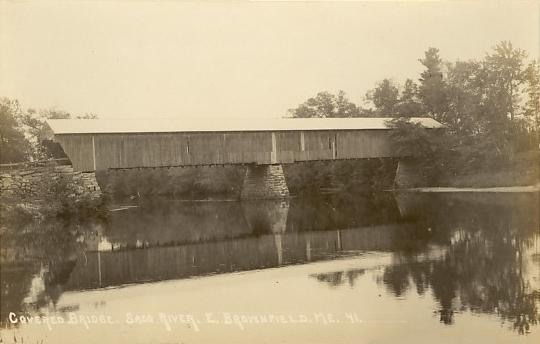
Saco River at East Brownfield c. 1912

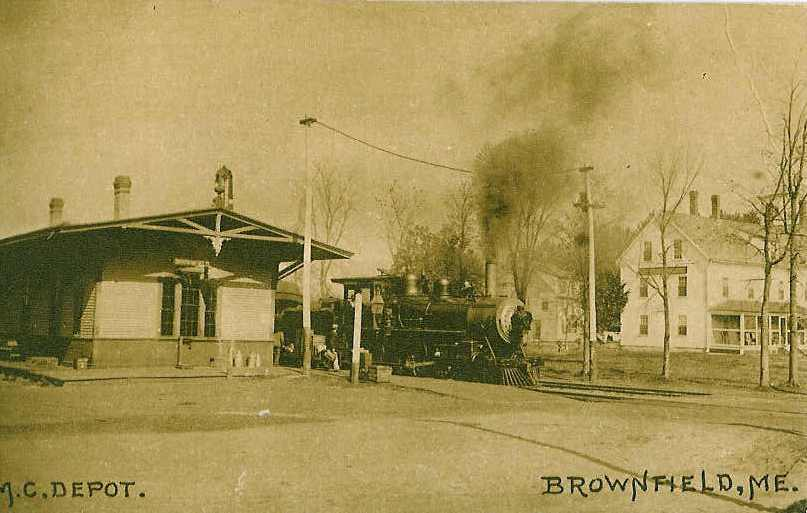
M.C.R.R. depot in 1912, East Brownfield

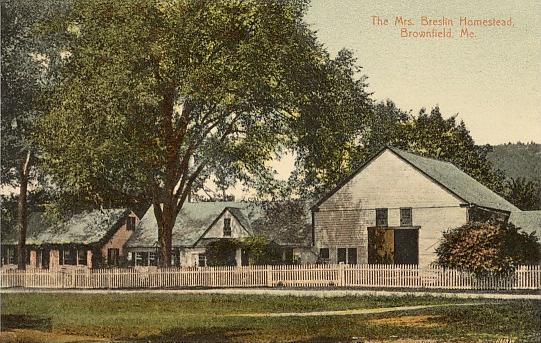
Breslin homestead c. 1910

=== 2010 census ===
As of the census of 2010, there were 1,597 people, 662 households, and 453 families living in the town. The population density was 35.9 inhabitants per square mile (13.9/km^{2}). There were 973 housing units at an average density of 21.9 per square mile (8.5/km^{2}). The racial makeup of the town was 97.7% White, 0.3% African American, 0.4% Asian, 0.1% Pacific Islander, 0.4% from other races, and 1.3% from two or more races. Hispanic or Latino of any race were 0.3% of the population.

There were 662 households, of which 28.5% had children under the age of 18 living with them, 55.4% were married couples living together, 7.3% had a female householder with no husband present, 5.7% had a male householder with no wife present, and 31.6% were non-families. 24.8% of all households were made up of individuals, and 6.2% had someone living alone who was 65 years of age or older. The average household size was 2.41 and the average family size was 2.86.

The median age in the town was 44.8 years. 20.7% of residents were under the age of 18; 6.8% were between the ages of 18 and 24; 23% were from 25 to 44; 35.4% were from 45 to 64; and 14% were 65 years of age or older. The gender makeup of the town was 50.3% male and 49.7% female.

=== 2000 census ===
As of the census of 2000, there were 1,251 people, 512 households, and 352 families living in the town. The population density was 27.9 inhabitants per square mile (10.8/km^{2}). There were 788 housing units at an average density of 17.6 per square mile (6.8/km^{2}). The racial makeup of the town was 98.88% White, 0.16% Native American, 0.08% Pacific Islander, and 0.88% from two or more races. Hispanic or Latino of any race were 0.32% of the population.

There were 512 households, out of which 29.9% had children under the age of 18 living with them, 54.7% were married couples living together, 9.0% had a female householder with no husband present, and 31.3% were non-families. 22.9% of all households were made up of individuals, and 9.0% had someone living alone who was 65 years of age or older. The average household size was 2.44 and the average family size was 2.86.

In the town, the population was spread out, with 23.7% under the age of 18, 6.2% from 18 to 24, 27.2% from 25 to 44, 29.0% from 45 to 64, and 13.9% who were 65 years of age or older. The median age was 41 years. For every 100 females, there were 96.7 males. For every 100 females age 18 and over, there were 97.1 males.

The median income for a household in the town was $33,304, and the median income for a family was $39,886. Males had a median income of $30,893 versus $22,778 for females. The per capita income for the town was $16,037. About 4.9% of families and 8.6% of the population were below the poverty line, including 7.5% of those under age 18 and 8.0% of those age 65 or over.

== Sites of interest ==
- Brownfield Historical Society & Museum
- Stone Mountain Arts Center

== Notable people ==
- Philo T. Farnsworth, inventor
- Paris Gibson, entrepreneur, senator
- Robert Goodenow, US congressman
- Rufus K. Goodenow, US congressman
- Carol Noonan, singer and songwriter
- Augustus G. Paine, Sr., financier
