= Bridgton (CDP), Maine =

Bridgton, Maine
- Census-designated place
- Location in Cumberland County and the state of Maine
- Coordinates: 44°04′15″N 70°43′52″W
- Country: United States
- State: Maine
- County: Cumberland
- Town: Bridgton

Area
  - Total: 9.51 sq mi (24.62 km^{2})
  - Land: 7.39 sq mi (19.15 km^{2})
  - Water: 2.12 sq mi (5.48 km^{2})
- Elevation: 509 ft (155 m)

Population (2020)
  - Total: 2,118
  - Density: 286.5/sq mi (110.61/km^{2})
- Time zone: UTC-5 (Eastern (EST))
  - Summer (DST): UTC-4 (EDT)
- ZIP Codes: 04009 (Bridgton); 04057 (North Bridgton)
- Area code: 207
- FIPS code: 23-07135
- GNIS feature ID: 2377892

Bridgton is a census-designated place (CDP) in the town of Bridgton in Cumberland County, Maine, United States. The CDP comprises the villages of Bridgton and North Bridgton within the town. The population of the CDP was 2,071 at the 2010 census. It is part of the Portland–South Portland–Biddeford, Maine Metropolitan Statistical Area.

== Geography ==
According to the United States Census Bureau, the CDP has a total area of 9.5 square miles (24.6 km^{2}), of which 7.4 square miles (19.1 km^{2}) are land and 2.1 square miles (5.5 km^{2}), or 22.40%, are water.

== Demographics ==
Historical population
Census	Pop.	Note	%±
2000	2,359		—
2010	2,071		−12.2%
2020	2,118		2.3%
U.S. Decennial Census

As of the census of 2000, there were 2,359 people, 926 households, and 577 families residing in the CDP. The population density was 240.6 inhabitants per square mile (92.9/km^{2}). There were 1,334 housing units at an average density of 136.1 per square mile (52.5/km^{2}). The racial makeup of the CDP was 97.16% White, 0.76% Black or African American, 0.08% Native American, 0.34% Asian, 0.42% from other races, and 1.23% from two or more races. Hispanic or Latino of any race were 1.02% of the population.

There were 926 households, out of which 28.8% had children under the age of 18 living with them, 45.1% were married couples living together, 12.6% had a female householder with no husband present, and 37.6% were non-families. 30.8% of all households were made up of individuals, and 14.6% had someone living alone who was 65 years of age or older. The average household size was 2.52 and the average family size was 2.85.

In the CDP, the population was spread out, with 20.8% under the age of 18, 15.5% from 18 to 24, 25.0% from 25 to 44, 22.9% from 45 to 64, and 15.9% who were 65 years of age or older. The median age was 37 years. For every 100 females, there were 106.4 males. For every 100 females age 18 and over, there were 106.0 males.

The median income for a household in the CDP was $31,115, and the median income for a family was $40,134. Males had a median income of $26,447 versus $21,429 for females. The per capita income for the CDP was $16,494. About 10.7% of families and 21.2% of the population were below the poverty line, including 14.7% of those under age 18 and 7.2% of those age 65 or over.
