= North Bridgton, Maine =

Coordinates: 44°05′55″N 70°41′55″W

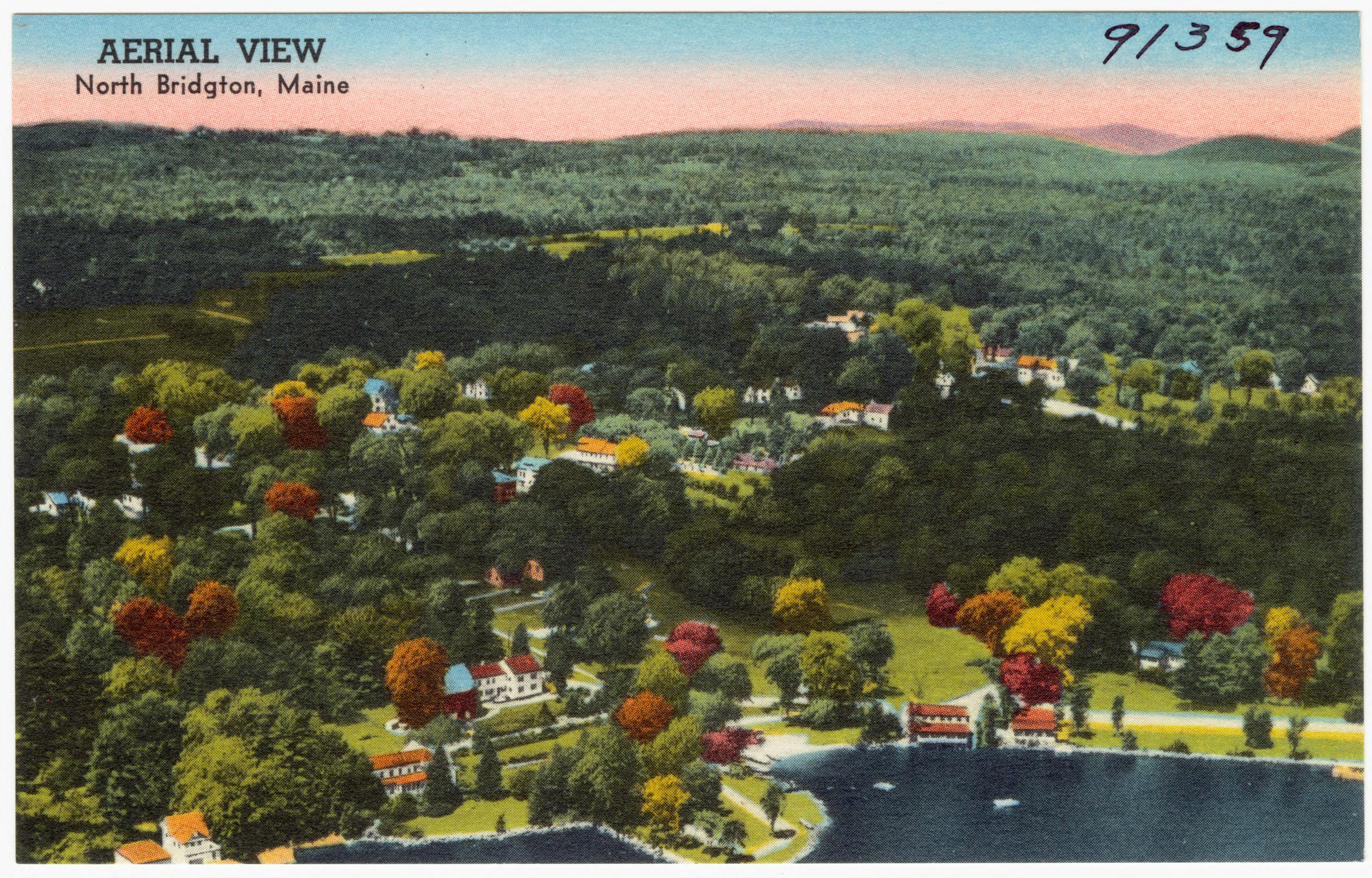
Postcard view

North Bridgton is a village in the town of Bridgton in Cumberland County, Maine, United States. It is located just west of Long Lake, and just south of the town of Harrison. In 1768, the undeveloped land was granted by the Massachusetts General Court to a group of proprietors led by a man named Moody Bridges. Settlement began in 1770, when a tavern was built.

It is home to Bridgton Academy, an all-boys college-preparatory school. The ZIP code for North Bridgton is 04057; this ZIP code only applies to mail sent to post office boxes at the North Bridgton Post office. Street delivery in the neighborhood of North Bridgton carries the Bridgton address and ZIP code of 04009. North Bridgton also has the highest recorded temperature in the state, at 105 °F (41 °C).

North Bridgton was once served by the Bridgton and Saco River Railroad. One of the last surviving iron bridges from Maine's narrow-gauge railway, built in 1898 by the Berlin Iron Bridge Company of East Berlin, Connecticut, once spanned Stevens Brook. It was salvaged by a private collector and is undergoing restoration by the Maine Narrow Gauge Railroad Museum in Portland.
