= Bethel (CDP), Maine =

Bethel, Maine
- Census-designated place
- Location within Maine Location within the United States
- Coordinates: 44°24′14″N 70°47′11″W
- Country: United States
- State: Maine
- County: Oxford
- Town: Bethel

Area
  - Total: 1.63 sq mi (4.22 km^{2})
  - Land: 1.63 sq mi (4.22 km^{2})
  - Water: 0 sq mi (0.00 km^{2})
- Elevation: 738 ft (225 m)

Population (2020)
  - Total: 658
  - Density: 404.1/sq mi (156.01/km^{2})
- Time zone: UTC-5 (Eastern (EST))
  - Summer (DST): UTC-4 (EDT)
- ZIP Code: 04217
- Area code: 207
- FIPS code: 23-04790
- GNIS feature ID: 2806281

Bethel is a census-designated place (CDP) and the primary village in the town of Bethel, Oxford County, Maine, United States. It is situated in the southwestern part of the town, south of the Androscoggin River. U.S. Route 2 passes through the northwestern side of the CDP, leading northeast 23 miles (37 km) to Rumford and west 22 miles (35 km) to Gorham, New Hampshire. Maine State Route 5 joins Route 2 in Bethel but runs south through the village center and continues southwest 36 miles (58 km) to Fryeburg. State Route 26 leads southeast from Bethel 24 miles (39 km) to South Paris.

Bethel was first listed as a CDP prior to the 2020 census.

== Demographics ==
Historical population
Census	Pop.	Note	%±
2020	658		—
U.S. Decennial Census
