= Fryeburg (CDP), Maine =

Fryeburg, Maine
- Census-designated place
- Location within Maine Location within the United States
- Coordinates: 44°01′13″N 70°58′24″W
- Country: United States
- State: Maine
- County: Oxford

Area
  - Total: 3.01 sq mi (7.80 km^{2})
  - Land: 3.00 sq mi (7.77 km^{2})
  - Water: 0.012 sq mi (0.03 km^{2})
- Elevation: 423 ft (129 m)

Population (2020)
  - Total: 1,444
  - Density: 481.1/sq mi (185.74/km^{2})
- Time zone: UTC-5 (Eastern (EST))
  - Summer (DST): UTC-4 (EDT)
- ZIP code: 04037
- Area code: 207
- FIPS code: 23-26875
- GNIS feature ID: 2377913

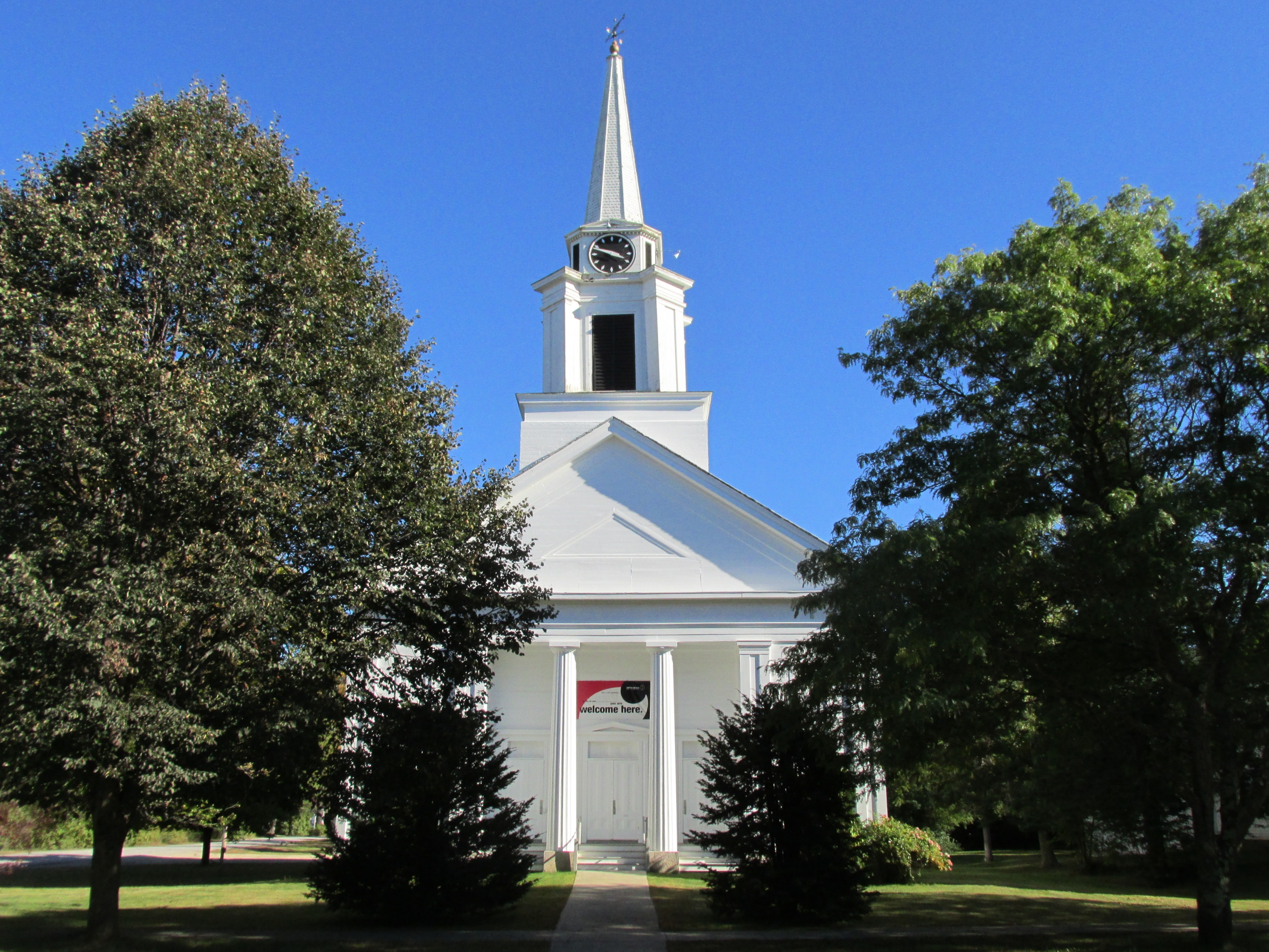
First Congregational Church of Fryeburg

Fryeburg is a census-designated place (CDP) in the town of Fryeburg in Oxford County, Maine, United States. The population was 1,444 at the 2020 census.

== Geography ==
According to the United States Census Bureau, the CDP has a total area of 3.0 square miles (7.7 km^{2}), of which 3.0 square miles (7.7 km^{2}) is land and 0.04 square mile (0.1 km^{2}) (0.67%) is water.

== Demographics ==
Historical population
Census	Pop.	Note	%±
2020	1,444		—
U.S. Decennial Census

As of the census of 2000, there were 1,549 people, 666 households, and 404 families residing in the CDP. The population density was 520.7 inhabitants per square mile (201.0/km^{2}). There were 770 housing units at an average density of 258.8 per square mile (99.9/km^{2}). The racial makeup of the CDP was 98.39% White, 0.32% Black or African American, 0.06% Native American, 0.26% Pacific Islander, 0.06% from other races, and 0.90% from two or more races. Hispanic or Latino of any race were 0.32% of the population.

There were 666 households, out of which 26.9% had children under the age of 18 living with them, 47.1% were married couples living together, 10.8% had a female householder with no husband present, and 39.2% were non-families. 33.3% of all households were made up of individuals, and 15.0% had someone living alone who was 65 years of age or older. The average household size was 2.22 and the average family size was 2.83.

In the CDP, the population was spread out, with 21.2% under the age of 18, 7.5% from 18 to 24, 24.0% from 25 to 44, 27.4% from 45 to 64, and 20.0% who were 65 years of age or older. The median age was 43 years. For every 100 females, there were 80.5 males. For every 100 females age 18 and over, there were 79.8 males.

The median income for a household in the CDP was $33,125, and the median income for a family was $41,579. Males had a median income of $30,664 versus $19,750 for females. The per capita income for the CDP was $18,950. About 10.5% of families and 10.9% of the population were below the poverty line, including 11.9% of those under age 18 and 12.5% of those age 65 or over.
