= South Branch Mad River =

- Location within New Hampshire Location within Maine Location within the United States

Location
- Country: United States
- States: New Hampshire, Maine
- Counties: Coos, NH, Oxford, ME
- Townships: Bean's Purchase, NH, South Oxford, ME

Physical characteristics
- Source: West Royce Mountain
  - location: Bean's Purchase, NH
  - coordinates: 44°17′27″N 71°1′31″W
  - elevation: 2,400 ft (730 m)
- Mouth: Mad River
  - location: South Oxford, ME
  - coordinates: 44°17′9″N 71°0′20″W
  - elevation: 807 ft (246 m)
- Length: 1.1 mi (1.8 km)

The South Branch of the Mad River is a 1.1-mile-long (1.8 km) mountain brook on the Maine-New Hampshire border in the United States, within the eastern White Mountains. It is a tributary of the Mad River, a short feeder of the Cold River, part of the Saco River watershed.

The South Branch, beginning in New Hampshire and finishing in Maine, flows east off the slopes of West Royce Mountain. It joins the Mad River less than 0.l mile above that river's end at the Cold River in the floor of Evans Notch.

== See also ==
- List of rivers of Maine
- List of rivers of New Hampshire
