= Brickett Place =

Historic house in Maine, United States

- U.S. National Register of Historic Places
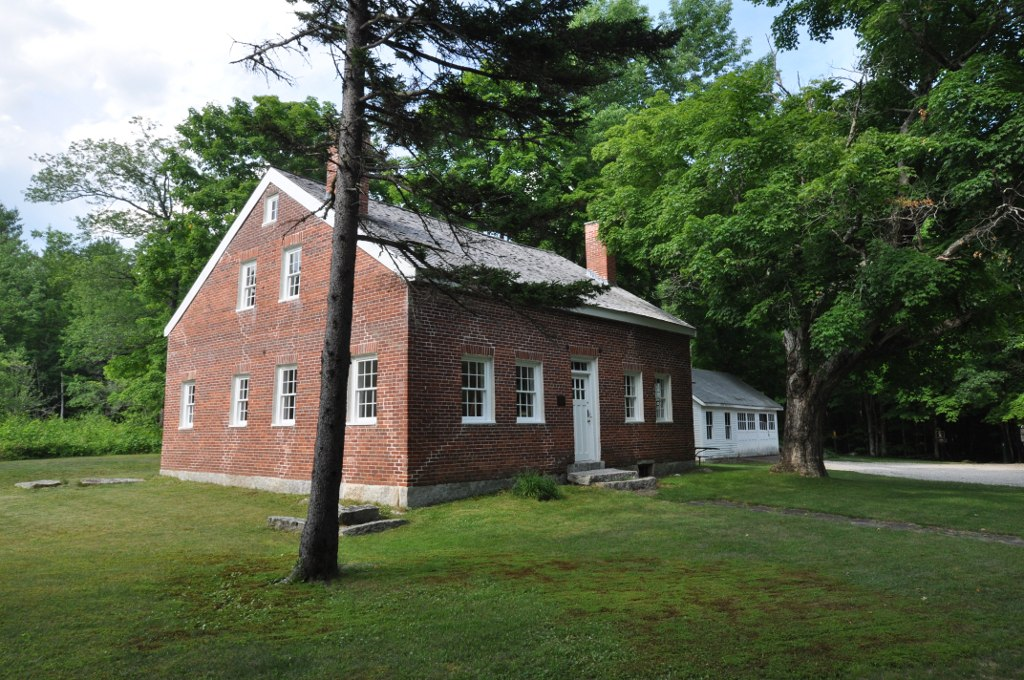

- Location within Maine Location within the United States
- Location: Maine State Route 113, Stow, Maine
- Coordinates: 44°16′3″N 71°0′18″W
- Area: less than one acre
- Built: 1812
- Built by: John Brickett
- Architectural style: Federal
- NRHP reference No.: 82000772
- Added to NRHP: July 28, 1982

The Brickett Place is a historic farmstead in rural Oxford County, Maine, United States. It is located in the White Mountain National Forest on Maine State Route 113, in the small town of Stow. Built from 1812 to 1816 by John Brickett out of handmade bricks, it is an idiosyncratic expression of Federal architecture in an unusually remote setting, and is the oldest building in the United States Forest Service's Eastern Region. It was listed on the National Register of Historic Places in 1982. It is currently used by the United States Forest Service as a seasonal visitors center, with interpretive displays about the area's history.

== Description ==
Brickett Place is located in a small clearing east of Maine State Route 113 in northern Stow, Maine, at the southern approach to the Caribou/Speckled Mountain Wilderness. In addition to the main house, the clearing includes a small garage (built by the Civilian Conservation Corps (CCC) in the 1930s), vestiges of stone walls, and a small parking area.

The main house is a 1 1/2-story brick structure with a gable roof, resting on a granite foundation. There are four chimneys rising from the interior near the side walls. The main facade faces south, and is five bays wide, with a center entrance topped by a three-light transom window. Wood-frame porches, an early 20th-century addition, line the north and west sides of the house, and a decorative hood of similar age shelters the secondary entrance.

The interior of the house follows a typical Federal-period center hall plan, although this has been partially interrupted by the addition of a bathroom. Some of the original trim survives inside, and is of late Federal styling.

== History ==
John Brickett was one of the first settlers of the Cold River valley, arriving in 1803. He lived with his family in a log cabin for a number of years, and began construction of this house in 1812, making the bricks himself. The house took four years to complete. Brickett did not own the land on which he built: it was part of a large tract granted to Josiah Bachelder in 1816, which was later incorporated as the town of Stow. Brickett purchased title to 50 acres (20 ha) from Bachelder in 1820. The house remained in the Brickett family until 1877, and was acquired by the United States Forest Service in 1918.

During the period of Forest Service ownership, the property has seen a variety of uses. Organizations using the structure have included the CCC, who used it as a work center, the Appalachian Mountain Club, which used it as a hostel, and the Boy Scouts of America, and it has also served as a Forest Service guard station. The building was subjected to detailed restoration work in 2009–11.

== See also ==
- National Register of Historic Places listings in Oxford County, Maine
