= Middle Branch Mad River =

- Location within New Hampshire Location within Maine Location within the United States

Location
- Country: United States
- States: New Hampshire, Maine
- Counties: Coos, NH, Oxford, ME
- Townships: Bean's Purchase, NH, South Oxford, ME

Physical characteristics
- Source: West Royce Mountain
  - location: Bean's Purchase, NH
  - coordinates: 44°17′43″N 71°1′15″W
  - elevation: 2,340 ft (710 m)
- Mouth: Mad River
  - location: South Oxford, ME
  - coordinates: 44°17′26″N 71°0′24″W
  - elevation: 1,130 ft (340 m)
- Length: 0.8 mi (1.3 km)

The Middle Branch of the Mad River is a 0.8-mile-long (1.3 km) mountain brook on the Maine-New Hampshire border in the United States, within the eastern White Mountains. It is a tributary of the Mad River, a short feeder of the Cold River, part of the Saco River watershed.

The Middle Branch flows east off the slopes of West Royce Mountain, beginning in New Hampshire and finishing in Maine. It joins the Mad River just upstream of Mad River Falls near the foot of the mountain.

== See also ==
- List of rivers of New Hampshire
