= Mad River (Cold River tributary) =

- Location within Maine Location within New Hampshire Location within the United States

Location
- Country: United States
- States: New Hampshire, Maine
- Counties: Coos, NH, Oxford, ME
- Townships: Bean's Purchase, NH, South Oxford, ME

Physical characteristics
- Source: West Royce Mountain
  - location: Beans Purchase, NH
  - coordinates: 44°18′9″N 71°0′47″W
  - elevation: 2,450 ft (750 m)
- Mouth: Cold River
  - location: Evans Notch, ME
  - coordinates: 44°17′7″N 71°0′16″W
  - elevation: 790 ft (240 m)
- Length: 1.4 mi (2.3 km)

Basin features
- Tributaries
  - right: Middle Branch, South Branch

The Mad River is a 1.4-mile-long (2.3 km) mountain brook on the Maine–New Hampshire border in the United States, within the eastern White Mountains. It is a tributary of the Cold River, part of the Saco River watershed.

The Mad River rises in New Hampshire in the col between West Royce and East Royce mountains, at an elevation of 2,500 feet (760 m) above sea level. The river quickly drops to the south down the slopes of Royce Mountain, entering Maine and dropping over Mad River Falls, a 70-foot-tall (21 m) cascade. The river joins the Cold River in the floor of Evans Notch, a narrow pass through the White Mountains.

== See also ==
- List of rivers of Maine
- List of rivers of New Hampshire
