= Little Cold River =

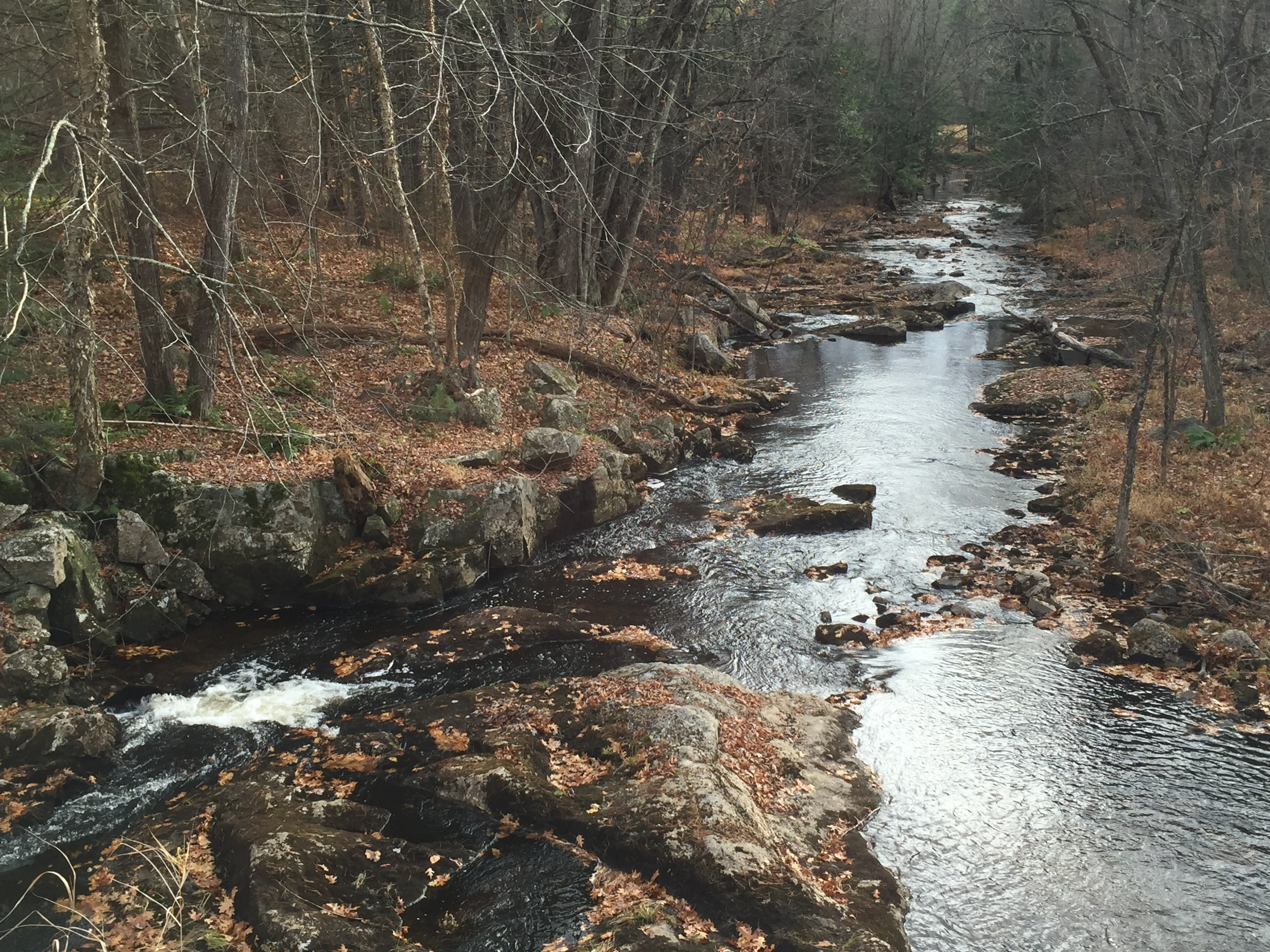
- The Little Cold River at Route 113B in Stow, Maine

- Location within Maine Location within New Hampshire Location within the United States

Location
- Country: United States
- States: New Hampshire, Maine
- Counties: Carroll, NH, Oxford, ME
- Towns: Chatham, NH, Stow, ME

Physical characteristics
- Source: Confluence of Watson Brook & McDonough Brook
  - location: Chatham, NH
  - coordinates: 44°10′24″N 71°0′40″W
  - elevation: 497 ft (151 m)
- Mouth: Cold River
  - location: Stow, ME
  - coordinates: 44°9′10″N 70°58′7″W
  - elevation: 380 ft (120 m)
- Length: 3.9 mi (6.3 km)

Basin features
- Tributaries
  - right: Langdon Brook

The Little Cold River is a 3.9-mile-long (6.3 km) stream in western Maine in the United States, flowing through the foothills of the White Mountains. It is a tributary of the Cold River, part of the Saco River watershed.

The river begins in Chatham, New Hampshire, at the junction of McDonough Brook and Watson Brook. Flowing east, the river enters Maine after only one-half mile. Turning more southeast, the river passes the village of Stow, reaching the Cold River one mile upstream from the latter river's end at Charles Pond in Fryeburg.

== See also ==
- List of rivers of New Hampshire
