= North Waterford Congregational Church =

Historic church in Maine, United States

- U.S. National Register of Historic Places
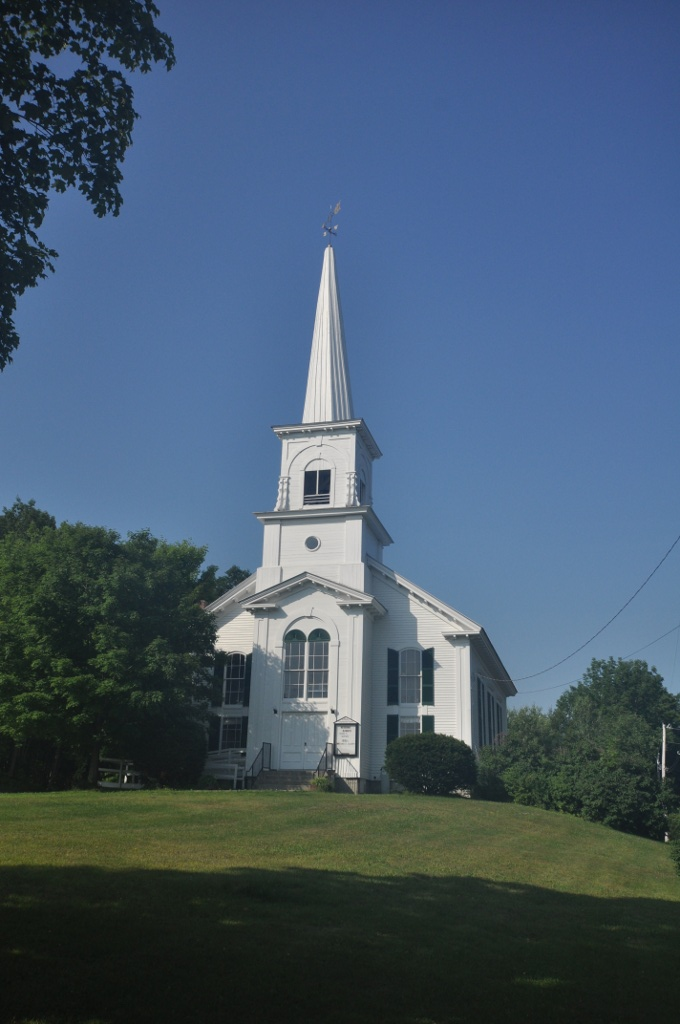

- Location within Maine Location within the United States
- Location: Off ME 35, North Waterford, Maine
- Coordinates: 44°16′57″N 70°46′24″W
- Area: 0.5 acres (0.20 ha)
- Built: 1860
- Architect: Holt, Thomas; Hobson, George
- Architectural style: Italianate
- NRHP reference No.: 86001275
- Added to NRHP: June 13, 1986

The North Waterford Congregational Church is a historic church off ME 35 in North Waterford, Maine. It is a two-story wood frame rectangular structure, with a projecting entry and tower section at the front. Built in 1860, is an attractive Italianate building representing a mature work of Thomas Holt, a Maine architect known for his churches and railroad stations. The building was listed on the National Register of Historic Places in 1986.

== Description and history ==
The North Waterford Church was established in 1860 by congregants of the main Waterford Congregational Church located in Waterford Village who lived in northern Waterford and did not want to travel that distance for services. The church was designed by Thomas Holt, a native of Bethel who designed several other churches in the state, but is more widely known for his railroad architecture. The church was raised in June 1860 and dedicated in December of the same year. It continues to be occupied by the same congregation.

The church is set at the high point of a narrow triangular green bounded on its long sides by Five Kezars Road and Irving Green Road. It is a two-story wood-frame structure set on a granite foundation and sheathed predominantly in wooden clapboards. Projecting from the main (northeast-facing) facade is an entry section which rises to support the tower. This section has double doors at the ground level, accessed via granite steps, with a pair of tall round-arch windows above, and is generally flushboarded. This complex is framed by pilasters and a keystoned arch. Above this is the projecting section is interrupted by a gabled roof, with partial returns and bracketed eaves.

The tower is set partially in the projection and partially in the main block. It begins with a square section that continues the projection upward above its gable roof, with slightly projecting end blocks. Above this is the proper first stage of the tower, which features a small round window in the front facade, with projecting corner sections, and a cornice line above. The second stage houses the belfry, with square louvered sections framed by inner and outer pilastered arches, and decorative corner woodwork. Another cornice line, studded with doubled Italianate brackets, separates this stage from the octagonal steeple, weathervane, and spire.

== See also ==
- National Register of Historic Places listings in Oxford County, Maine
