= The Lake House (Waterford, Maine) =

Inn and restaurant in Maine, US

Coordinates: 44°10′54″N 70°42′57″W

The Lake House is an historic tavern located at the Waterford Flat area of Waterford in Maine. It is an inn and restaurant north of Keoka Lake and near Mount Tire'm.

== History ==
The tavern was built by prominent businessman Eli Longley in 1797, the year the town of Waterford was incorporated. In 1847, it became The Maine Hygienic Institute for Ladies, which in the 1880s was then converted to a hotel. Guests were drawn to the beauty and seclusion of the antique lakeside village, much of which is now listed on the National Register of Historic Places. Patrons would include Mickey Rooney, Claudette Colbert and Judy Garland.
