= Waterford Historic District (Waterford, Maine) =

Historic district in Maine, United States

- U.S. National Register of Historic Places
- U.S. Historic district
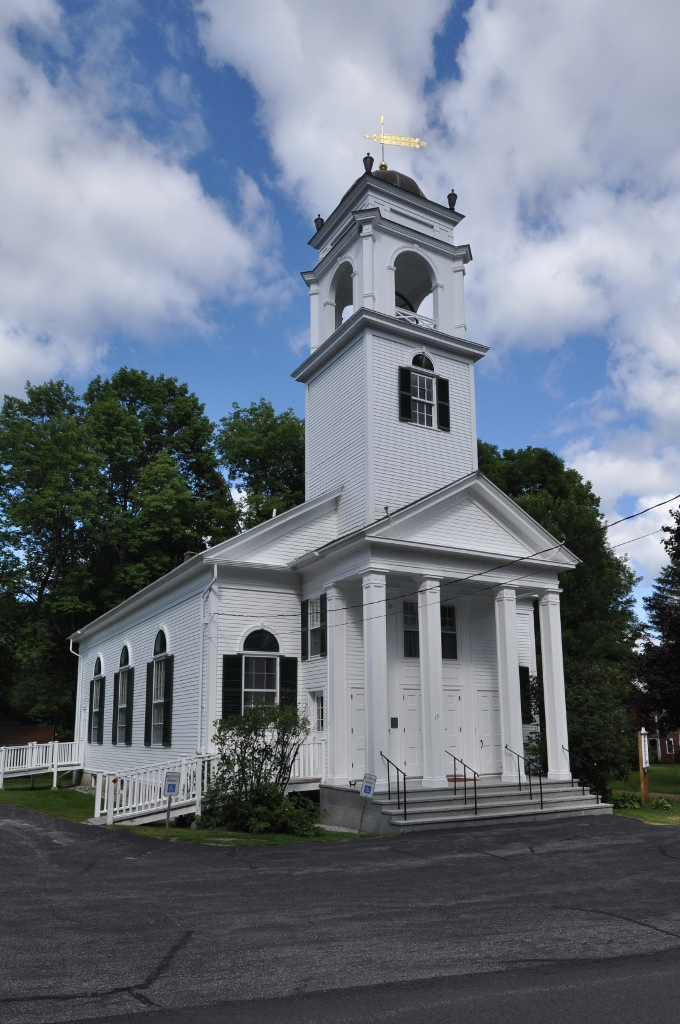
- Waterford's First Congregational Church

- Location within Maine Location within the United States
- Location: ME 35 and ME 37, Waterford, Maine
- Coordinates: 44°10′54″N 70°43′1″W
- Area: 35 acres (14 ha)
- Architect: Multiple
- Architectural style: Greek Revival, Federal, Colonial Revival
- NRHP reference No.: 80000247 (original); 11000583 (increase)

Significant dates
- Added to NRHP: April 24, 1980
- Boundary increase: August 23, 2011

The Waterford Historic District encompasses the well-preserved historic town center, also known as Waterford Flat, of the rural inland town of Waterford, Maine. Settled in 1775, the town grew around a site where Kedar Brook empties into Keoka Lake. The oldest surviving building, the Lake House, dates to 1797, while most of the houses were built before 1850. Prominent public buildings include a series designed by John Calvin Stevens, including the Knight Library, Wilkins Community Hall, and First Congregational Church. The district was listed on the National Register of Historic Places in 1980.

== Description and history ==
The town of Waterford was surveyed and settled in 1775. In 1793 Eli Longley built a log cabin near the mouth of Kedar Brook at Keoka Lake, and four years later built what is now called the Lake House, as a tavern to serve travelers. The town center grew on Langley's land over the following years, based on his layout. The historic district extends along Maine State Routes 35 and 37 southward from the town green, and northward beyond Kedar Brook to the junction of Rice and Waterford Streets, and also extends a short way along Plummer Hill Road and Valley Road. There are 27 historically significant properties in the district, most of which were built before 1850, and are residential. Notable among these is the 1805 Levi Browne House, which was the birthplace of humorist Charles Farrar Browne (1834–67), who wrote under the pen name Artemus Ward. One of the architecturally finer Federal period houses is that of Ambrose Knight, who was a local shop owner. The village's oldest municipal building is the 1843 Greek Revival town house.

Between 1850 and 1900 a small number of buildings were added to the district, which are either Italianate of transitional Greek Revival-Italianate in style. Prominent amongst them is the Leander Stone House, built c. 1870 by a local builder for his family, and the 1879 Masonic Hall, also built by Stone. Most of the civic buildings in the district were built before 1930, and are Colonial Revival in style. Three of them were designed by the noted Portland architect John Calvin Stevens, including the First Congregational Church and adjacent Wilkins Community Hall, both dating to 1928. The Knight Library was first built in 1911-12, but was destroyed by fire, and rebuilt in 1938 to a plan by Stevens.

== See also ==
- National Register of Historic Places listings in Oxford County, Maine
