= The Lake House =

(The) Lake House may refer to:

- Lake house (real estate), a house located on or near a lake; a cottage or summer house

== Places ==
- Lake House (Antarctica), a lake in Victoria Land, Antarctica

== Entertainment ==
- The Lake House (film), a 2006 film
- The Lake House (Patterson novel), a 2003 novel by James Patterson
- The Lake House (Rhode novel), a 1946 detective novel by John Rhode
- The Lake House, a 2015 novel by Kate Morton
- Lakehouse (2013 EP), album by Lebanese band Postcards (band)
- The Lakehouse (2006 song), song by Rachel Portman, from the 2006 film The Lake House, on the soundtrack album The Lake House: Original Motion Picture Soundtrack
- "The Lake House" (Brooklyn Nine-Nine), an episode of the eighth season of Brooklyn Nine-Nine
- Lake House (DLC), a downloadable content (DLC) for the 2023 video game Alan Wake 2

== Facilities and structures ==
- The Lake House (Waterford, Maine), a historic tavern
- Lake House, an Elizabethan country house in Wiltshire, England
- Lake House, a building in the Olds-Robb Recreation-Intramural Complex, Eastern Michigan University's recreation center
- Lake House, recreational park at Angelo State University, Texas
- Lakehouse, a residential highrise in Denver, Colorado, USA; see List of tallest buildings in Denver

== Companies ==
- Lake House, now known as Associated Newspapers of Ceylon Limited, located in Sri Lanka
- Lakehouse plc, a British energy company, renamed Sureserve in October 2018.

== See also ==
- Loon Lake House, a hotel at Loon Lake (Franklin County, New York)
- Moon's Lake House, a resort at Saratoga Springs, New York
