= Waterford Historic District =

Waterford Historic District may refer to:

- Waterford Historic District (Waterford, Maine), listed on the National Register of Historic Places in Oxford County, Maine
- Waterford Historic District (Waterford, Virginia), a National Historic Landmark and listed on the National Register of Historic Places in Loudoun County, Virginia
- Waterford Village Historic District (Waterford, New York), listed on the National Register of Historic Places listings in Saratoga County, New York
