= Bickford Slides =

Coordinates: 44°16′12″N 70°59′21″W

Bickford Slides is a 90-foot (30 m) waterfall in the town of Stow, Maine, United States. Located on Bickford Brook within the White Mountain National Forest's Caribou-Speckled Mountain Wilderness, it consists of two tiers of cascades and slides, the upper tier 40 feet high and the lower tier 50 feet high.

== See also ==
- List of waterfalls
