= List of mountain passes in Maine =

List of mountain passes and gaps in Maine, United States

The following is a list of mountain passes and gaps in the U.S. state of Maine.

Name	Mountain range	County	Elevation	Coordinates	Primary access route	Other access route(s)	GNIS
Evans Notch	White Mountains	Oxford	1,410 feet (430 m)	44°18′18″N 70°59′23″W	SR 113		581018
Grafton Notch	Mahoosuc Range	Oxford	1,542 feet (470 m)	44°35′48″N 70°56′49″W	SR 26		567019
Mahoosuc Notch	Mahoosuc Range	Oxford	2,461 feet (750 m)	44°32′29″N 70°59′36″W	Appalachian Trail		570665
