= Caribou-Speckled Mountain Wilderness =

Protected area in Maine, United States

- IUCN category Ib (wilderness area)
- Location within Maine Location within the United States
- Location: Oxford County, Maine, USA
- Nearest city: Stoneham, ME
- Coordinates: 44.2999857°N 70.9612118°W
- Area: 11,236 acres (45 km^{2})
- Established: 1990
- Governing body: U.S. Forest Service

Caribou-Speckled Mountain Wilderness is an 11,236-acre (4,547 ha) wilderness area under the jurisdiction of the White Mountain National Forest in the U.S. state of Maine. Established in 1990, the Wilderness contains an abundance of geologic features such as cliffs, slides, notches, and glacial potholes among a forest of northern hardwood trees. Streams run out of the area that form tributaries to the Saco and Androscoggin Rivers.

The high point of the wilderness is Speckled Mountain at 2,906 feet (885 m). Mt. Caribou is the second highest at 2,840 feet (865 m). According to the U.S. Forest Service, "Mt. Caribou got its name after two brothers shot the last caribou in the region there in 1854. Their names are carved on the top of the mountain."

== See also ==
- List of U.S. Wilderness Areas
