= Charles River (Maine) =

Coordinates: 44.12868°N 70.94701°W

Location
- Country: United States

Physical characteristics
- Source
  - location: Maine

The Charles River is a 1.2-mile-long (1.9 km) channel connecting Charles Pond with the Old Course Saco River in the town of Fryeburg in western Maine, United States. It forms the natural extension of the Cold River, which flows from the White Mountains, New Hampshire, around Evans Notch south to Charles Pond.

== See also ==
- List of rivers of Maine
