= Evans Notch =

Mountain pass in Maine

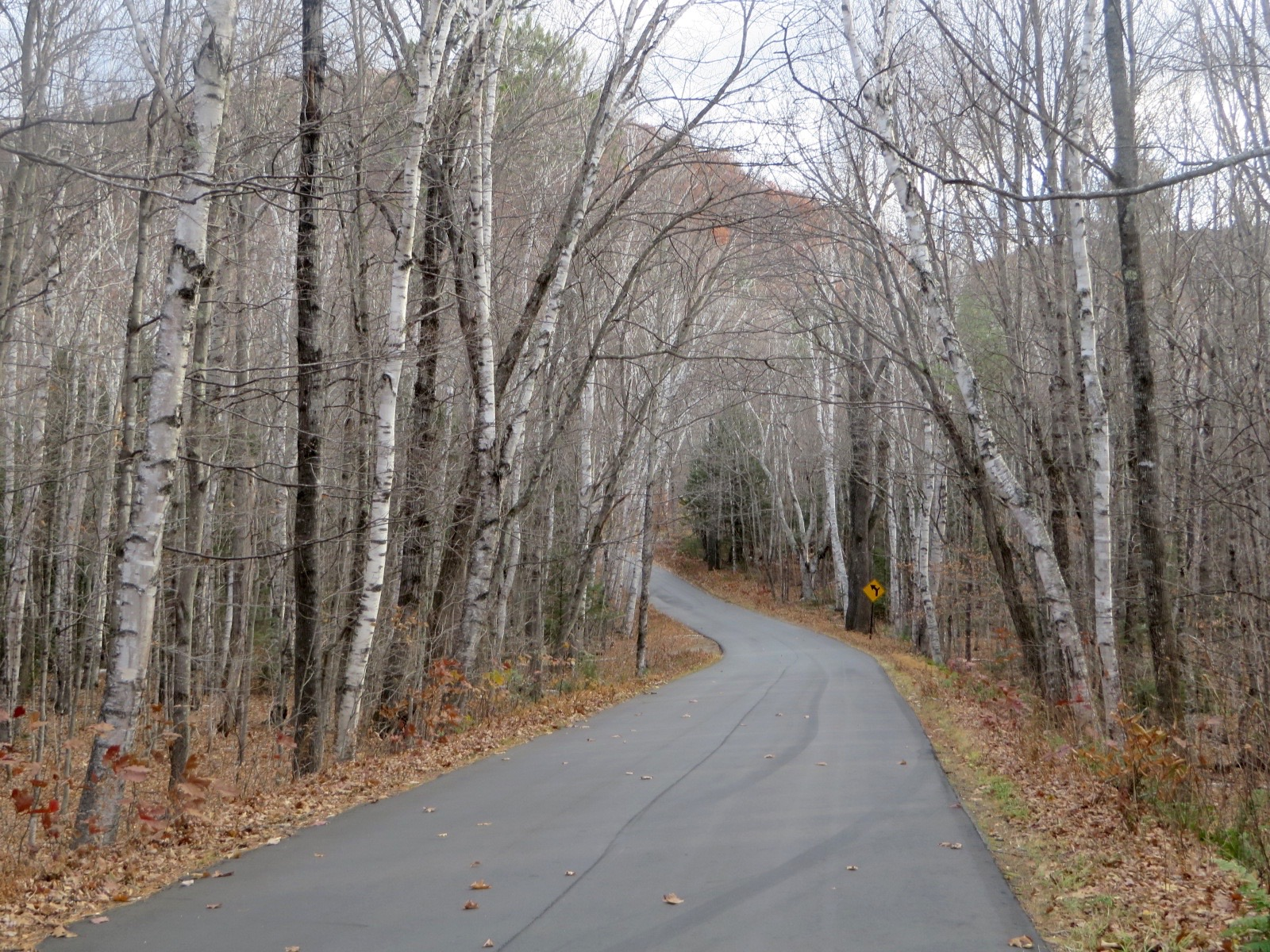
- South entrance to the notch on ME 113
- Interactive map of Evans Notch
- Elevation: 1,410 ft (430 m)
- Traversed by: ME 113

Third Approach
- Location: Oxford County, Maine, United States
- Range: White Mountains
- Coordinates: 44°18′18″N 70°59′23″W
- Topo map: USGS Speckled Mountain, Wild River

Evans Notch (elev. 1,410 ft or 430 m) is a mountain pass located in the White Mountains in Maine, United States, about 1 mile (1.6 km) east of the New Hampshire border. It is the easternmost notch through the White Mountains (the next ones to the west being Carter Notch and Pinkham Notch). To the south, the notch is drained by the Cold River, which leads via the Charles River to the Saco River, which in turn flows into the Gulf of Maine east of Saco and Biddeford. The Mad River is a small mountain stream that joins the Cold River from the west about 2 miles (3 km) south of the height of land, after dropping over Mad River Falls. The notch is drained to the north by Evans Brook, a tributary of the Wild River, which flows north to the Androscoggin River. The Androscoggin leads east and south to the Kennebec River at Merrymeeting Bay north of Bath, Maine.

Maine State Route 113 traverses the notch on its route from Fryeburg on the Saco River in the south to Gilead on the Androscoggin River in the north.

To the west of the height of land in Evans Notch are West and East Royce Mountain, elevations 3,200 feet (980 m) and 3,114 feet (949 m), respectively. The summit of West Royce is in New Hampshire, while East Royce is in Maine. The Royces form the northern end of the Baldface-Royce Range of mountains. To the east of the notch's height of land is Speckled Mountain, elevation 2,906 feet (886 m).

Numerous hiking trails begin in the notch. To the west, the Royce Trail, Laughing Lion Trail, and East Royce Trail all climb the Royce Mountains, while to the east, the Bickford Brook Trail and Spruce Hill Trail lead onto the Speckled Mountain massif.

== See also ==
- List of mountain passes in Maine
- List of mountain passes in New Hampshire
