= Dixfield (CDP), Maine =

Dixfield, Maine
- Census-designated place
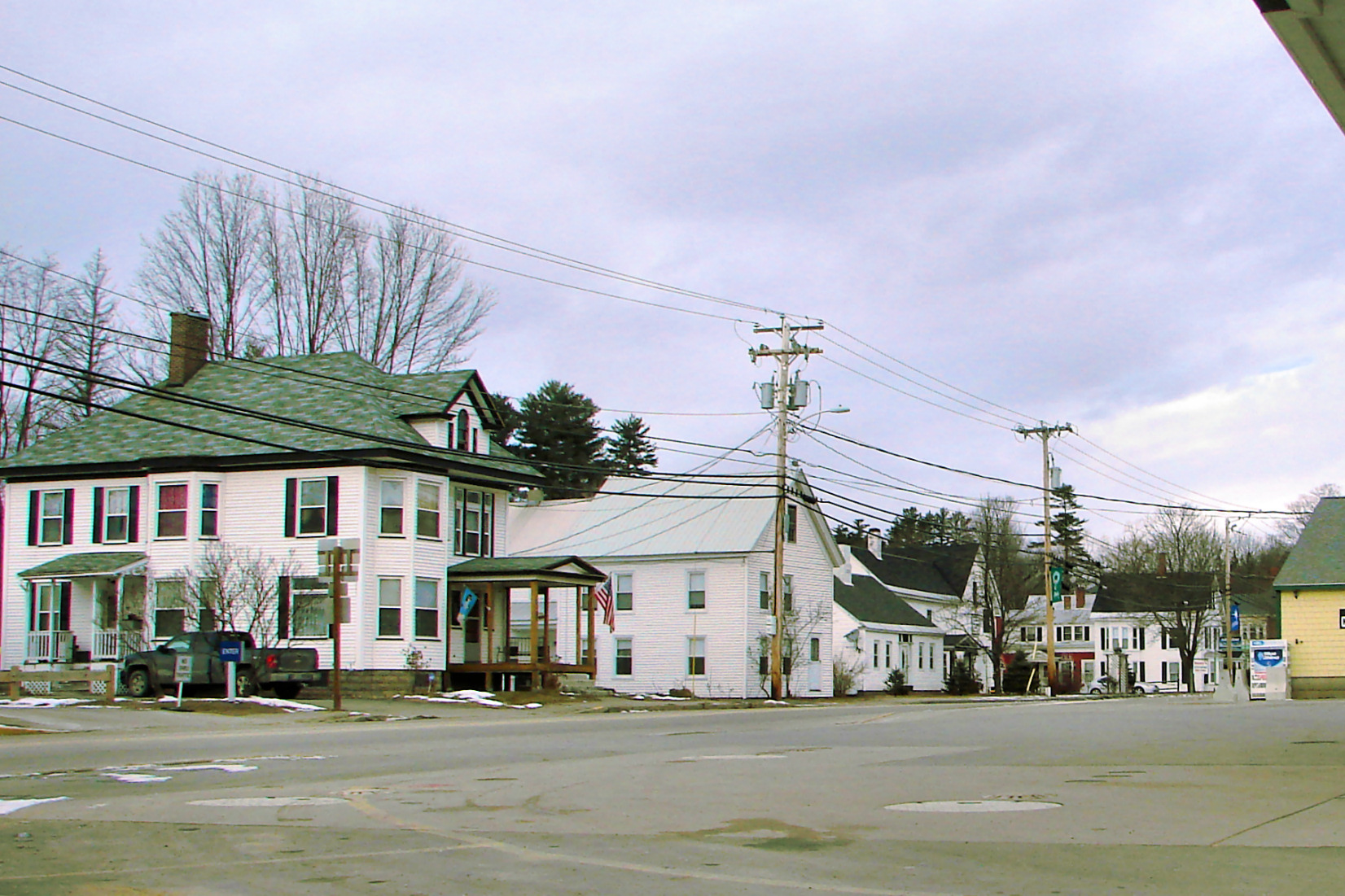
- Street scene in Dixfield

- Location within Maine Location within the United States
- Coordinates: 44°32′14″N 70°26′52″W
- Country: United States
- State: Maine
- County: Oxford

Area
  - Total: 1.90 sq mi (4.91 km^{2})
  - Land: 1.79 sq mi (4.64 km^{2})
  - Water: 0.10 sq mi (0.27 km^{2})
- Elevation: 505 ft (154 m)

Population (2020)
  - Total: 1,323
  - Density: 738.7/sq mi (285.21/km^{2})
- Time zone: UTC-5 (Eastern (EST))
  - Summer (DST): UTC-4 (EDT)
- ZIP code: 04224
- Area code: 207
- FIPS code: 23-17705
- GNIS feature ID: 2377903

Dixfield is a census-designated place (CDP) in the town of Dixfield in Oxford County, Maine, United States. The population was 1,323 at the 2020 census.

== Geography ==
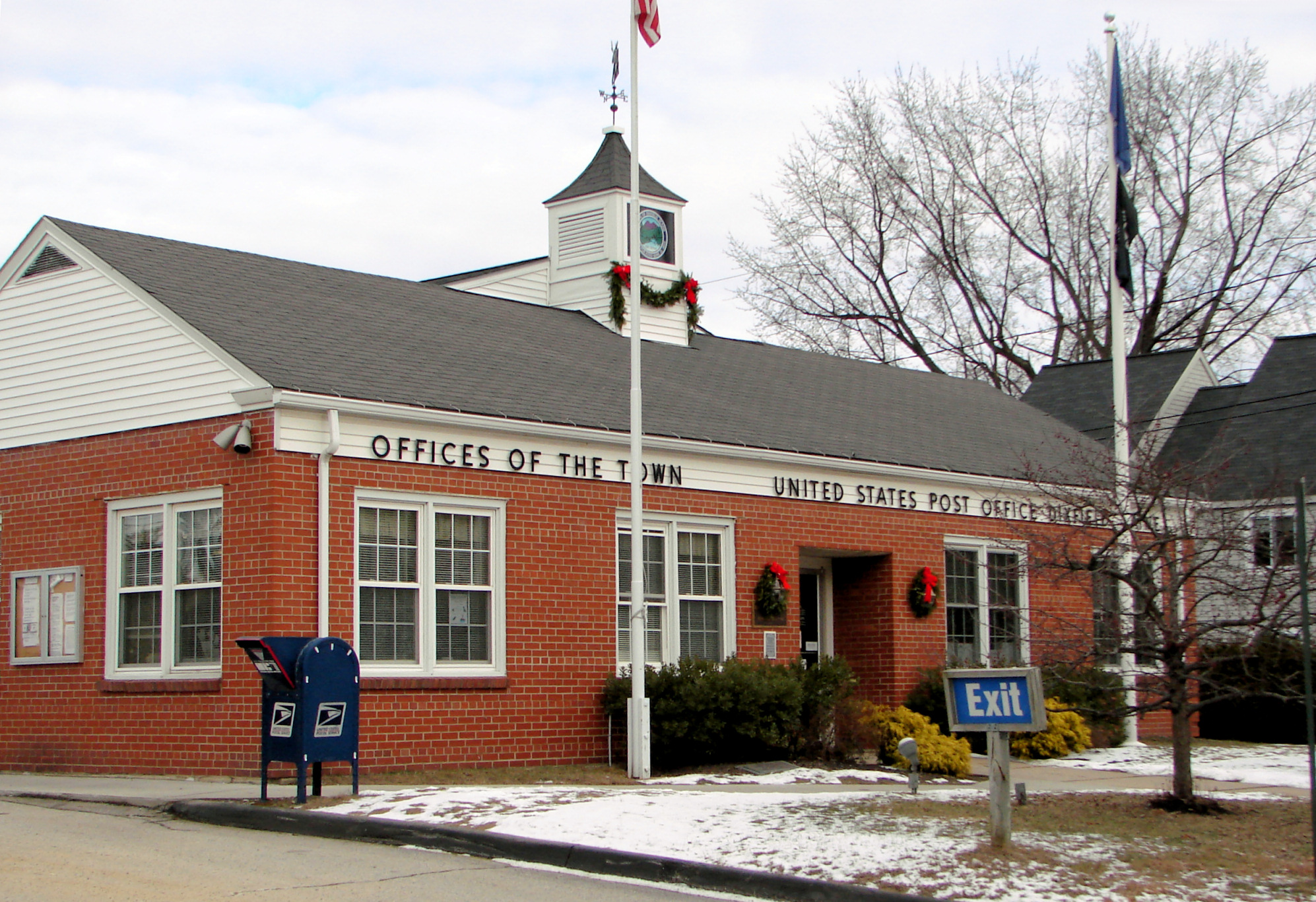
Dixfield town hall and post office

According to the United States Census Bureau, the CDP has a total area of 0.8 square miles (2.2 km^{2}), all land.

== Demographics ==
Historical population
Census	Pop.	Note	%±
2020	1,323		—
U.S. Decennial Census

As of the census of 2020, there were 1,323 people, 581 households, and 606 families residing in the CDP. The population density was 1,353.2 inhabitants per square mile (522.5/km^{2}). There were 655 housing units at an average density of 344.73 per square mile (133.10/km^{2}). The racial makeup of the CDP was 98.24% White, 0.44% Native American, 0.53% Asian, 0.09% from other races, and 0.70% from two or more races. Hispanic or Latino of any race were 0.26% of the population.

There were 581 households, out of which 29.2% had children under the age of 18 living with them, 50.8% were married couples living together, 10.0% had a female householder with no husband present, and 34.3% were non-families. 29.8% of all households were made up of individuals, and 15.1% had someone living alone who was 65 years of age or older. The average household size was 2.32 and the average family size was 2.84.

In the CDP, the population was spread out, with 15.1% under the age of 18, 63.0% from 18 to 65, and 16.1% who were 65 years of age or older. The median age was 41 years. For every 100 females, there were 85.8 males. For every 100 females age 18 and over, there were 87.3 males.

The median income for a household in the CDP was $35,676, and the median income for a family was $50,208. Males had a median income of $36,250 versus $25,208 for females. The per capita income for the CDP was $16,304. About 5.1% of families and 27.9% of the population were below the poverty line, including 53.6% of those under age 18 and 25.0% of those age 65 or over.
