= Waterford, Maine =

Town in Maine, United States

- Town
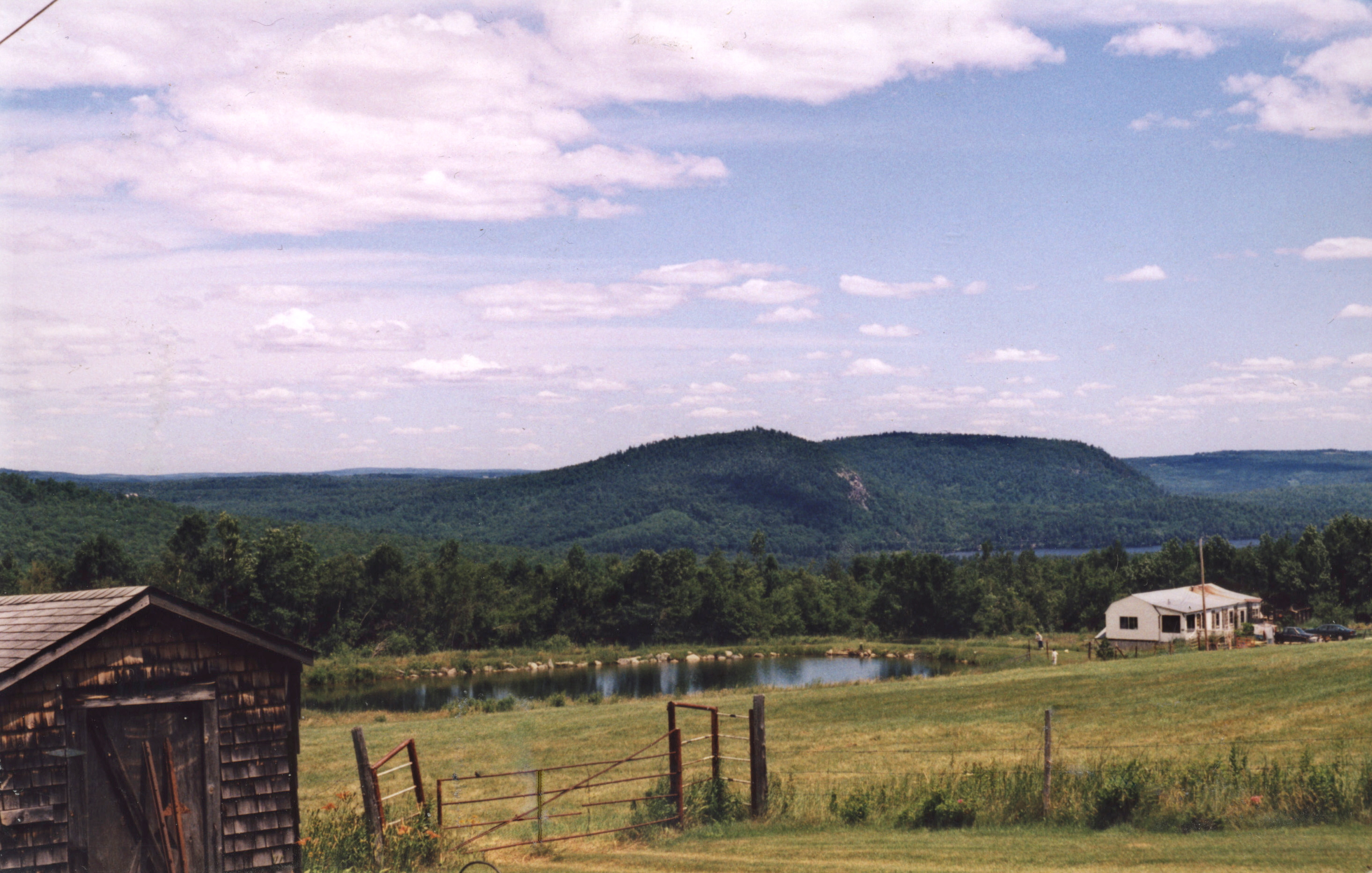
- View from Blackguard Road

- Seal

- Location within Maine Location within the United States
- Coordinates: 44°11′37″N 70°43′27″W
- Country: United States
- State: Maine
- County: Oxford
- Incorporated: 1797

Area
  - Total: 52.92 sq mi (137.06 km^{2})
  - Land: 50.24 sq mi (130.12 km^{2})
  - Water: 2.68 sq mi (6.94 km^{2})
- Elevation: 666 ft (203 m)

Population (2020)
  - Total: 1,570
  - Density: 31/sq mi (12.1/km^{2})
- Time zone: UTC-5 (Eastern (EST))
  - Summer (DST): UTC-4 (EDT)
- ZIP Codes: 04088 (Waterford); 04267 (North Waterford)
- Area code: 207
- FIPS code: 23-80635
- GNIS feature ID: 582794
- Website: www.waterfordme.org

Waterford is a town in Oxford County, Maine, United States. Waterford is included in the Lewiston-Auburn, Maine metropolitan New England city and town area. The population was 1,570 at the 2020 census. It is a recreation area noted for historic architecture and scenery.

== History ==
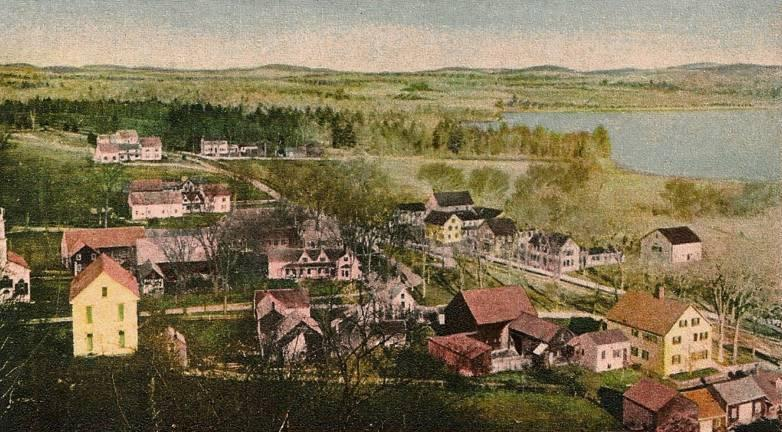
Waterford from Table Rock in 1905

The township was granted on February 24, 1774, by the Massachusetts General Court to Captain Andrew Gardner and his company of soldiers for services under Sir William Phipps during the 1690 expedition against Canada. It replaced a 1735 grant called Toddstown or Township No. 6 (now Henniker, New Hampshire), which was ruled invalid when the state line was redrawn between Massachusetts and New Hampshire in 1741.

The land was surveyed in 1774; in spring of 1775, David McWain of Bolton, Massachusetts arrived with his dog at a lot he bought for $40. He cleared land and built a log cabin, returning to Bolton for two winters until he settled permanently at Waterford in spring of 1777. McWain preferred solitude, and was deeply annoyed when he first saw smoke rising about 12 miles (19 km) away at Paris Hill. "Humph," he said, "I would like to know who is settling over there right under my nose!" Other grantees arrived nevertheless, most from the Massachusetts towns of Bolton, Harvard, Stow, Northborough and Rowley. Indeed, the northwestern part of the plantation was once known as Rowley after the inhabitants' former hometown.

On March 2, 1797, Waterford was incorporated, with land annexed from Albany in 1811. The surface of the town is uneven and somewhat mountainous. It was well-suited for pasturage and orchards, and agriculture became a principal occupation. Sawmills were built at streams to manufacture the region's abundant timber into lumber. Wood products included window sashes, barrel staves, salt boxes and buckets. There was also a gristmill, carriage factory and tannery. Today, Waterford Flat is a resort area, and home to The Lake House, a 1797 inn set among antique buildings listed on the National Register of Historic Places.

== Geography ==
According to the United States Census Bureau, the town has a total area of 52.92 square miles (137.06 km^{2}), of which 50.24 square miles (130.12 km^{2}) is land and 2.68 square miles (6.94 km^{2}) is water. Waterford is drained by the Crooked River. It contains a number of small lakes including Keoka Lake, McWain Pond, Bear Pond, as well as Mount Tire'm.

The town is traversed by state routes 35, 37 and 118. It is bordered by the towns of Norway to the northeast, Albany and Stoneham to the northwest, Sweden and Lovell to the southwest, and Harrison and Bridgton to the southeast.

== Demographics ==
Historical population
Census	Pop.	Note	%±
1790	154		—
1800	535		247.4%
1810	860		60.7%
1820	1,035		20.3%
1830	1,123		8.5%
1840	1,381		23.0%
1850	1,448		4.9%
1860	1,407		−2.8%
1870	1,286		−8.6%
1880	1,161		−9.7%
1890	1,001		−13.8%
1900	917		−8.4%
1910	934		1.9%
1920	765		−18.1%
1930	743		−2.9%
1940	836		12.5%
1950	828		−1.0%
1960	834		0.7%
1970	760		−8.9%
1980	951		25.1%
1990	1,299		36.6%
2000	1,455		12.0%
2010	1,553		6.7%
2020	1,570		1.1%
U.S. Decennial Census

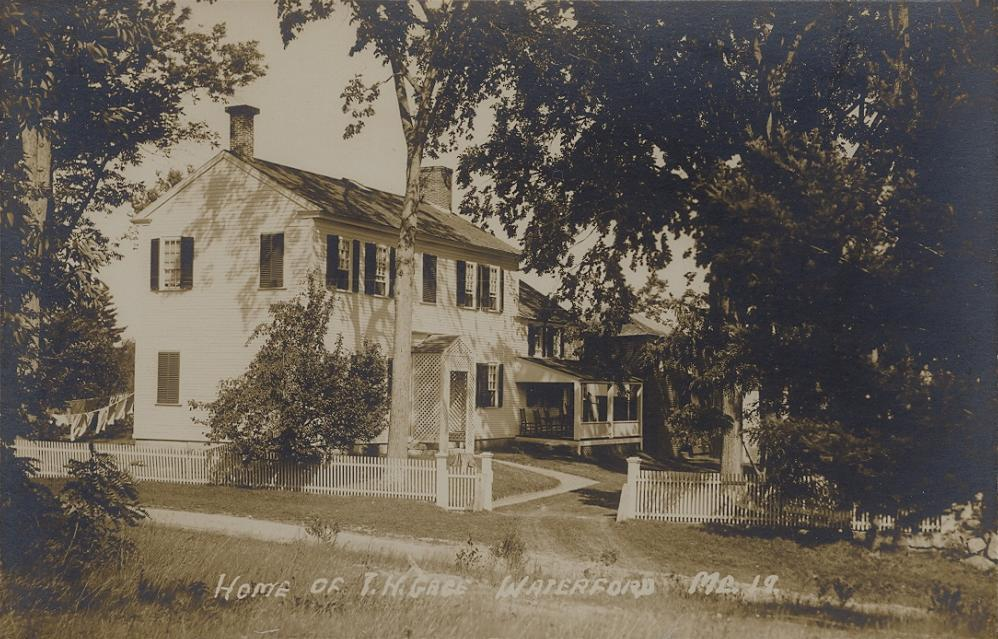
Home of Thomas Hovey Gage c. 1915, town historian

=== 2010 census ===
As of the census of 2010, there were 1,553 people, 667 households, and 471 families living in the town. The population density was 30.9 inhabitants per square mile (11.9/km^{2}). There were 1,084 housing units at an average density of 21.6 per square mile (8.3/km^{2}). The racial makeup of the town was 97.9% White, 0.1% African American, 0.2% Native American, 0.1% from other races, and 1.7% from two or more races. Hispanic or Latino of any race were 0.7% of the population.

There were 667 households, of which 28.0% had children under the age of 18 living with them, 54.3% were married couples living together, 10.3% had a female householder with no husband present, 6.0% had a male householder with no wife present, and 29.4% were non-families. 23.2% of all households were made up of individuals, and 9.7% had someone living alone who was 65 years of age or older. The average household size was 2.33 and the average family size was 2.68.

The median age in the town was 45.9 years. 20.8% of residents were under the age of 18; 6.2% were between the ages of 18 and 24; 21.4% were from 25 to 44; 33.7% were from 45 to 64; and 17.8% were 65 years of age or older. The gender makeup of the town was 49.5% male and 50.5% female.

=== 2000 census ===
As of the census of 2000, there were 1,455 people, 590 households, and 437 families living in the town. The population density was 28.8 inhabitants per square mile (11.1/km^{2}). There were 895 housing units at an average density of 17.7 inhabitants per square mile (6.8/km^{2}). The racial makeup of the town was 98.83% White, 0.27% Native American, 0.07% Asian, 0.07% Pacific Islander, and 0.76% from two or more races.

There were 590 households, out of which 29.2% had children under the age of 18 living with them, 60.5% were married couples living together, 9.3% had a female householder with no husband present, and 25.9% were non-families. 21.0% of all households were made up of individuals, and 7.6% had someone living alone who was 65 years of age or older. The average household size was 2.46 and the average family size was 2.80.

In the town, the population was spread out, with 23.5% under the age of 18, 6.6% from 18 to 24, 28.0% from 25 to 44, 27.6% from 45 to 64, and 14.2% who were 65 years of age or older. The median age was 40 years. For every 100 females, there were 101.0 males. For every 100 females age 18 and over, there were 97.3 males.

The median income for a household in the town was $31,458, and the median income for a family was $35,000. Males had a median income of $25,560 versus $22,188 for females. The per capita income for the town was $16,416. About 9.5% of families and 13.4% of the population were below the poverty line, including 20.0% of those under age 18 and 7.3% of those age 65 or over.

== Notable people ==
- Charles Farrar Browne (a.k.a. Artemus Ward), writer
- Mary Moody Emerson, Transcendentalist
- Elbridge Gerry, US congressman
- Cyrus Hamlin, missionary, educator
- Charlotte Elizabeth McKay, Union Army field nurse, editor, anti-suffragist
- Sawin Millett, Maine state representative
- Thomas Treadwell Stone, Unitarian minister, abolitionist
