= Albany Town House =

- U.S. National Register of Historic Places
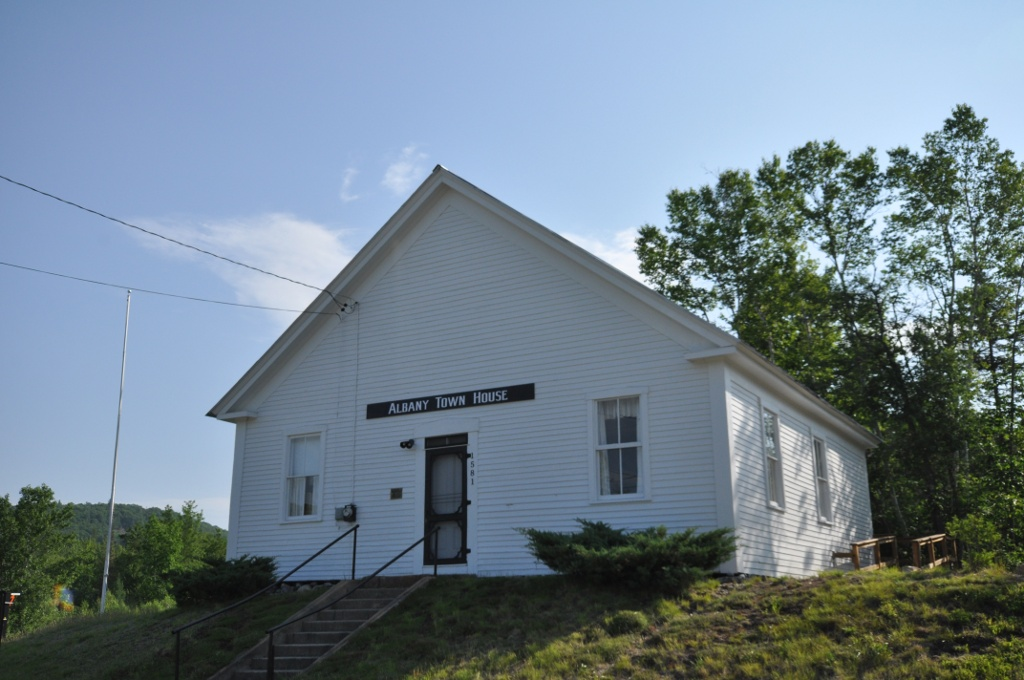

- Location within Maine Location within the United States
- Location: Jct. of ME 5 and ME 35, Albany Township, Maine
- Coordinates: 44°19′27″N 70°46′10″W
- Area: 0.3 acres (0.12 ha)
- Built: 1848
- Architectural style: Greek Revival
- NRHP reference No.: 07000793
- Added to NRHP: August 7, 2007

The Albany Town House is a historic town hall building at the junction of Maine Routes 5 and 35 with Vernon Street and Hunt's Corner Road in Albany Township, Maine. Built in 1848, it is the only surviving governmental structure of the former town of Albany, which was incorporated in 1803 and disincorporated in 1937. Since 1947 the building has been owned by the non-profit Albany Improvement Association, and continues to serve the area as a community hall. The building was listed on the National Register of Historic Places in 2007.

The town house is a single story wood-frame structure on a small rise. Nearby area a few houses, as well as the township's two other public buildings, a grange hall (1909) and church (1877–78). It is about 35 feet (11 m) square, with its main entrance facing south, toward Hunt's Corner Road. The main facade consists of a central entry flanked by sash windows. There is evidence that the doorway originally had sidelight windows; these appear to have been covered over or removed in a 20th-century re-siding of the structure. The door is topped by a slightly triangular header, a vernacular nod to Greek Revival styling popular at the time of the building's construction. A small addition, containing a privy and woodshed, extends north from the main block.

The interior of the building is an open hall with a small separated kitchen area in the southwest corner. The ceiling is finished in tin, a replacement (at unknown date) for the original plaster ceiling. The floor is narrow hardwood, and the walls are lined with beadboard wainscoting. There is a raised platform in the northeast corner, which once held a wood stove.

== See also ==
- National Register of Historic Places listings in Oxford County, Maine
