= Dickvale, Maine =

Coordinates: 44°29′08″N 70°28′49″W

Dickvale is a small village in the town of Peru, in Oxford County, situated in the western part of state of Maine, United States.
