= Mary Nyburg =

American potter and teacher

Mary E. Nyburg
- Born: Mary Eliza Cooper; July 10, 1918; Dixfield, Maine, U.S.
- Died: April 5, 2006 (aged 87); Fredericksburg, Texas, U.S.
- Known for: ceramicist and teacher

Mary Nyburg (July 10, 1918 — April 5, 2006) was an American potter known for creating functional pottery and her involvement in the American Craft scene.

== Biography ==
Nyburg née Cooper was born July 10, 1918 in Dixfield, Maine. She attended the University of Maine. She married Robert Nyburg and moved to Baltimore, Maryland where she began her career in ceramics. From 1977 through the early 1980's Nyburg participated in the Fair at Baltimore.

In 1980 Nyburg was made a Fellow of the Council by the American Craft Council. In 1988, after the death of her husband, she moved to Deer Isle, Maine. The National Museum of Women in the Arts gave Nyburg a Lifetime Achievement Award in 1993.

Nyburg was a founding member of American Craft Enterprises and served on the boards of the American Craft Council and the Maryland Craft Council. For a time, she was on the school board of trustees, including as president from 1983 to 1987, for the Haystack Mountain School of Crafts. She was also served on the board of directors of Baltimore Clayworks. She died on April 5, 2006, in Fredericksburg, Texas.

Her work is in the Delaware Art Museum. In 2007 Baltimore Clayworks established the Mary E. Nyburg Fund for Artist Development which is an annual stipend for ceramicists.
