= Mount Tire'm =

Mountain in Maine, United States

- Location within Maine

Highest point
- Elevation: 1,060 ft (320 m)
- Coordinates: 44°10′38″N 70°43′29″W

Geography
- Location: Oxford County, Maine, U.S.
- Topo map: USGS Waterford Flat

Climbing
- Easiest route: Hiking, class 1

Mount Tire'm is a small 1,060-foot (320 m) mountain adjacent to Keoka Lake in the town of Waterford, Maine. The Daniel Brown Trail offers access to the summit; its trailhead is on Plummer Hill Road just northwest of the village of Waterford. Views on clear days near the summit include vistas of Keoka Lake and Pleasant Mountain, the home of the Shawnee Peak Ski Area.
