= Keoka Lake =

Lake in Oxford County, Maine, United States

- Location within Maine Location within the United States
- Location: Waterford, Maine, United States
- Coordinates: 44°10′45″N 70°42′20″W
- Type: mesotrophic
- Catchment area: 7.1 square miles (18 km^{2})
- Basin countries: United States
- Surface area: 460 acres (190 ha)
- Average depth: 25 feet (7.6 m)
- Max. depth: 42 feet (13 m)
- Water volume: 11,001 acre⋅ft (13,570,000 m^{3})
- Residence time: 1.5 years
- Shore length^{1}: 4.5 miles (7.2 km)
- Surface elevation: 494 feet (151 m)
- Settlements: Waterford
- ^{1} Shore length is not a well-defined measure.

Keoka Lake is a small lake in the town of Waterford, Oxford County, Maine, United States. It is south of Waterford Flat and northeast of Waterford City (South Waterford). It is notable for being adjacent to the birthplace of Artemis Ward. Also known as Thomas Pond, it is approximately 460 acres (1.9 km^{2}) in size with a maximum depth of 14 meters (42 feet). It was formed by glaciers retreating and advancing along with Mount Tire'm, an adjacent mountain.
