= Cold River (Maine–New Hampshire) =

River in Maine, United States

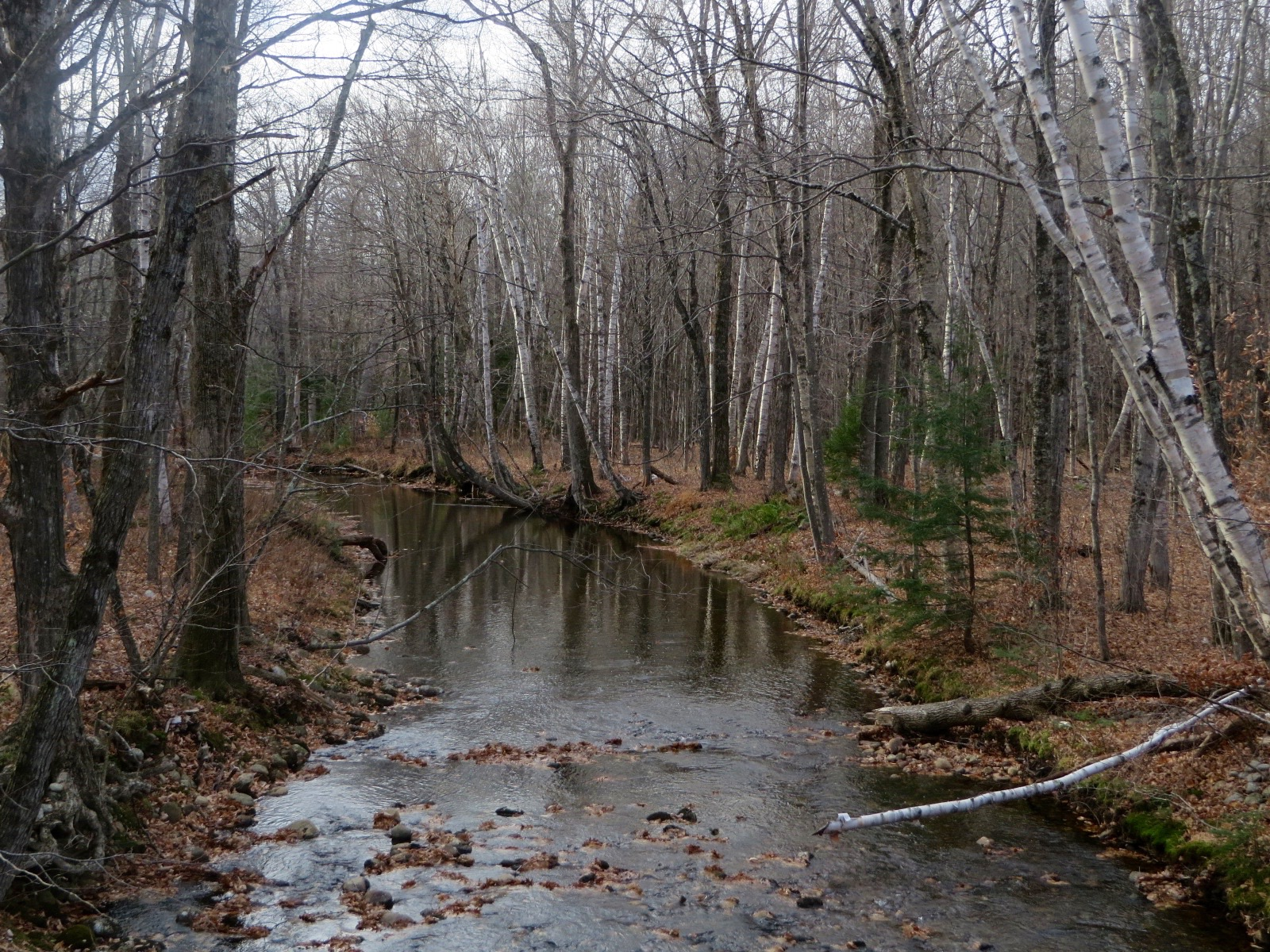
- The Cold River in Evans Notch

- Location within Maine Location within New Hampshire Location within the United States

Location
- Country: United States
- States: Maine, New Hampshire
- Counties: Oxford County, ME, Carroll County, NH
- Towns: Stow, ME, Chatham, NH, Fryeburg, ME

Physical characteristics
- Source
  - location: Evans Notch
  - coordinates: 44°18′18″N 70°59′55″W
  - elevation: 2,160 ft (660 m)
- Mouth: Charles Pond
  - location: Fryeburg, ME
  - coordinates: 44°8′10″N 70°58′0″W
  - elevation: 376 ft (115 m)
- Length: 16.7 mi (26.9 km)

Basin features
- Tributaries
  - left: Bickford Brook, Shell Pond Brook, Colton Brook
  - right: Mad River, Basin Brook, Mill Brook, Charles Brook, Chandler Brook, Bradley Brook, Little Cold River

The Cold River is a 16.7-mile-long (26.9 km) river in western Maine in the United States. It very briefly enters New Hampshire as well. It is part of the Saco River drainage basin.

The Cold River begins at the height of land in Evans Notch, a pass through the eastern White Mountains. Maine Highway 113, a narrow two-lane road, passes through the notch, following the Cold River on the south side and Evans Brook, a tributary of the Androscoggin River, on the north. The Cold River, flowing south, picks up the Mad River, a short stream with waterfalls that flows off the southern faces of East Royce and West Royce mountains, then reaches the southern base of Evans Notch at the junction of Basin Brook, coming out of a large glacial cirque to the west, where the Cold River Campground of the White Mountain National Forest is located.

South of Basin Brook, the Cold River briefly enters New Hampshire near the village of North Chatham, then veers back into Maine, flowing south-southeast in the town of Stow through an ever-widening valley. The Little Cold River enters from the west near the village of Stow. The Cold River ends at Charles Pond in the northern corner of Fryeburg. Water flows from Charles Pond via the short Charles River, entering the Old Course of the Saco River and eventually the Saco itself south of Kezar Pond.

== See also ==
- List of rivers of New Hampshire
- List of rivers of Maine
