= Sureserve =

UK-based asset and energy support services group

Sureserve Group Ltd
- Formerly: Sureserve Group plc
- Type: Privately held company
- Industry: Housing; Construction; Energy
- Founded: 1988
- Headquarters: Holborn, London, England
- Area served: UK
- Key people: Graham Levinsohn, Chief Executive Officer
- Services: renewables; energy savings; compliance
- Revenue: ▲£275.1 million (2023)
- Number of employees: 2,800 (2023)
- Divisions: Compliance, Energy Services
- Website: www.sureservegroup.co.uk

Sureserve Group (formerly Sureserve Group plc and Lakehouse plc) is a British company that provides energy and compliance services to social housing and other homes and businesses. It was founded in 1988 and as of May 2023, employed around 2,756 staff in 33 UK offices.

The group offer services in regeneration, compliance, energy services, and construction to the housing, education, public and commercial buildings sectors, with a focus on the UK public sector and regulated markets.

== History ==
=== Lakehouse era ===
Sureserve, which was known as Lakehouse until September 2019, was founded in 1988 and has headquarters in Dartford.

Between 2011 and 2015, Lakehouse acquired ten complementary businesses to expand geographically and provide broader services. In 2011 Lakehouse acquired gas compliance services provider K&T Heating. In 2012 it acquired fire compliance business Allied Protection. Foster Property Maintenance was acquired in 2013. In 2014 it acquired energy services provider Everwarm, who also install electric vehicle charging infrastructure and solar PV systems. and water and air compliance services provider H_{2}O Nationwide. In 2015 it acquired smart metering specialists Providor, energy services broker and energy management service provider Orchard Energy, gas compliance services businesses Sure Maintenance and Aaron Heating, and lift compliance services provider Precision Lifts.

Lakehouse floated on the London Stock Exchange in March 2015.

In July 2017, Lakehouse confirmed that its fire compliance business, Allied Protection, was engaged by Royal Borough of Kensington and Chelsea in January 2017 to certify installed fire safety systems in Grenfell Tower, destroyed by a large fire on 14 June 2017.

In August 2018, Lakehouse sold its construction and property services operations, Lakehouse Contracts, employing 236 staff, for £500,000 to a newly formed company, Mapps Group Limited.

=== Sureserve Group plc ===
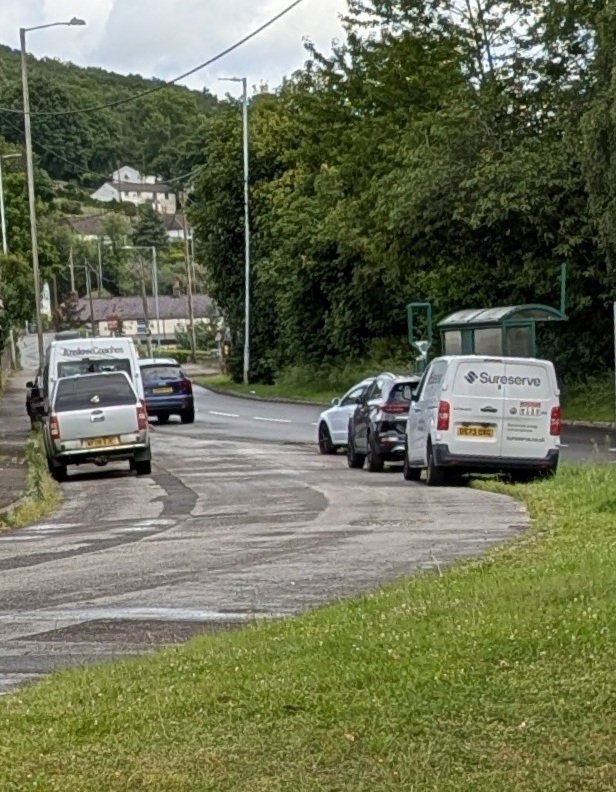
Van in Abersychan, Wales

On 1 October 2018, Lakehouse announced it had changed its name to Sureserve Group plc. The group decided on the name change following the sale of its construction and property services operations to a new firm, Mapps Group, which continued trading under the Lakehouse name.

In October 2018, ten people were charged as part of a fraud investigation relating to two contracts between Lakehouse and Hackney Homes relating to work in 2013–2014. During the case, Lakehouse confirmed it was cooperating with the Met’s fraud investigation and there is no suggestion of fraud on Lakehouse's part.

In January 2019, as its ex-owners, Sureserve announced it had set aside £2.5m for possible claims on projects carried out by the new business and had written off the £500,000 sale price to zero "in light of the weak performance of the activities since." In March 2019, Lakehouse Contracts entered administration and ceased trading. In June 2019, Sureserve said it had set aside £5.4m in provisions following the sale and subsequent collapse of the Lakehouse business.

After five years at Sureserve chairman and CEO Bob Holt stepped down in March 2021. Peter Smith was appointed CEO in November 2021, according to MarketScreener.

=== Sureserve Group Ltd ===
In April 2023, London private equity group Cap10 launched a £214m takeover bid for Sureserve. The all-cash acquisition was recommended and agreed by board members of both Sureserve and Cap10 4NetZero Bidco (Bidco). Sureserve Group plc was acquired in a Public-to-Private transaction by Cap10 Partners in 2023 and became Sureserve Group Ltd.

Following the takeover bid by Cap10, Graham Levinsohn was appointed Executive Chair & CEO of Sureserve Group in July 2023.

==== Acquisitions ====
In November 2023, Sureserve Group signed a deal for the entire issued share capital of Swale Heating Holdings Limited and its subsidiary Swale Heating Limited, a heating solutions business operating across the Southeast, London and East Anglia. In April 2024, it acquired Duality Group, a holding group with a portfolio of companies in the installation and maintenance of energy services for the residential and commercial sectors. In May 2025, Sureserve agreed a £56.4m deal to buy compliance rival Kinovo, a £64m-turnover business specialising in electrical safety and maintenance work.

== Awards ==
- Building Contractor of the year 2010
- Lord Mayor's Dragon Award 2011
- Building Diversity Champion of the Year 2011
- Responsible Business of the Year Community 2013
- Building Contractor of the year 2013
- Constructing Excellence Supply Chain of the Year 2013
- Construction Marketing Awards 2014 Best Branding and Positioning and Marketing Team of the Year
- Housing Excellence Customer Service Award 2015
