= North Waterford, Maine =

Coordinates: 44°13′54″N 70°46′07″W

North Waterford is a village in the town of Waterford in Oxford County, Maine, United States.
