= Slide (geography) =

Geographic feature

In physical geography, the term slide refers to a type of mass wasting characterized by the downslope movement of bedrock, debris, or earth along a failure surface. There are two types of slide failure, rotational slides (slumps) and translational (planar) slides.

Displaced material may accumulate as a landslide deposit at the base of a slope. Deposits often persist, but are subject to subsequent erosion, reworking, or remobilization by geomorphic processes.
