= Artemus Ward =

American writer (1834–1867)

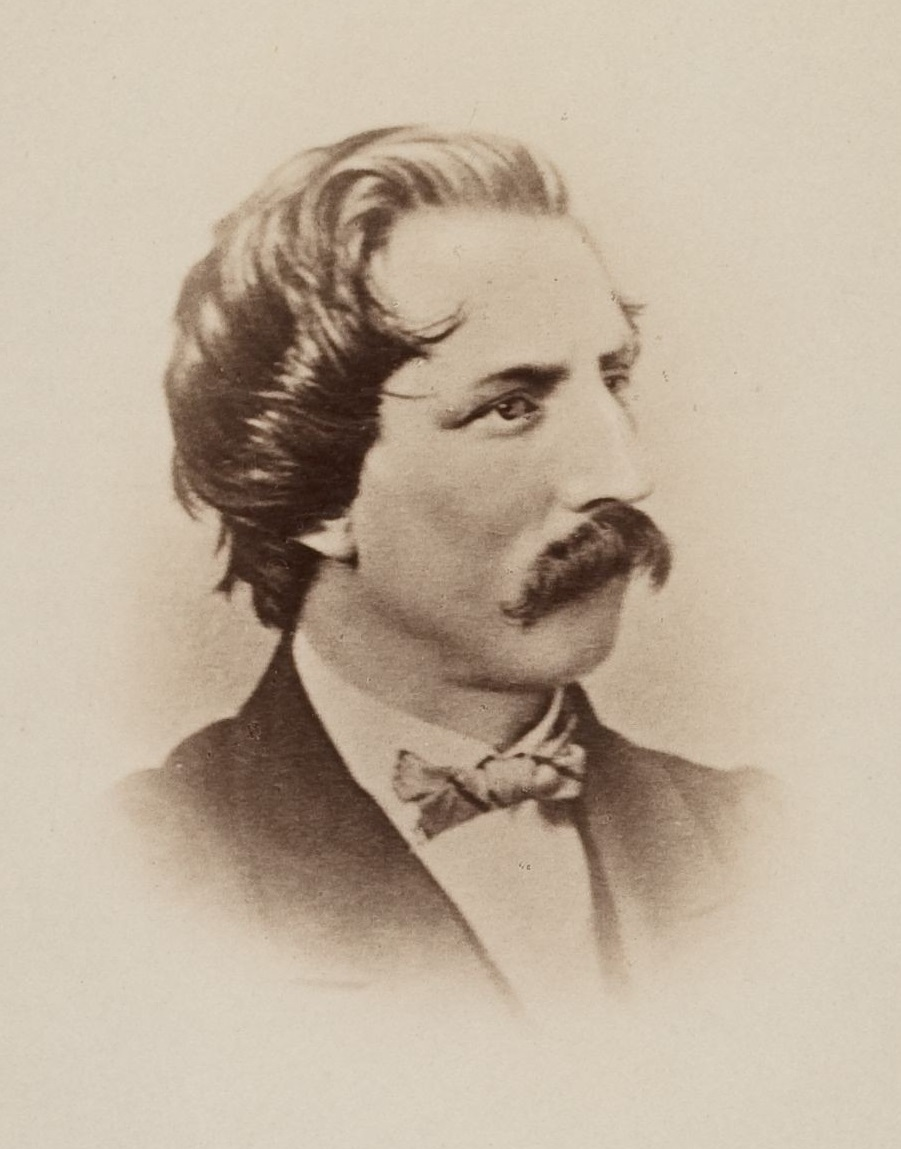
- "Artemus Ward"
- Born: Charles Farrar Brown; April 26, 1834; Waterford, Maine, U.S.
- Died: March 6, 1867 (aged 32); Southampton, Hampshire, United Kingdom

Charles Farrar Browne (April 26, 1834 – March 6, 1867) was an American humor writer, better known under his nom de plume, Artemus Ward. Ward was the character of an illiterate rube with "Yankee common sense", whom Browne also played in public performances. He is considered to be America's first stand-up comedian. His birth name was Brown but he added the "e" after he became famous.

== Early life and family ==
Browne was born on 26 April 1834, in Waterford, Maine to Caroline (née Farrar) "a descendant of the first Puritans" and Levi Brown, who "operated a store in Waterford, engaged in farming and did some surveying", and was a justice of the peace.

== Career ==
At the age fourteen, he apprenticed and "learned the printer's trade" at The Advertiser in Norway, Maine, and later apprenticed in the printing office of The Skowhegan Clarion, Skowhegan, Maine, then, as a compositor and occasional contributor to the daily and weekly journals. In 1858, he published in The Plain Dealer newspaper (Cleveland, Ohio) the first of the "Artemus Ward" series ("a barely literate circus sideshow manager who toured the country and wrote about the people and events he saw." "Loosely based on P.T. Barnum"), the writings achieved great popularity in both America and England in collected form.

Browne's companion at the Plain Dealer, George Hoyt, wrote:

His desk was a rickety table which had been whittled and gashed until it looked as if it had been the victim of lightning. His chair was a fit companion thereto, a wabbling, unsteady affair, sometimes with four and sometimes with three legs. But Browne saw neither the table, nor the chair, nor any person who might be near, nothing, in fact, but the funny pictures which were tumbling out of his brain. When writing, his gaunt form looked ridiculous enough. One leg hung over the arm of his chair like a great hook, while he would write away, sometimes laughing to himself, and then slapping the table in the excess of his mirth.

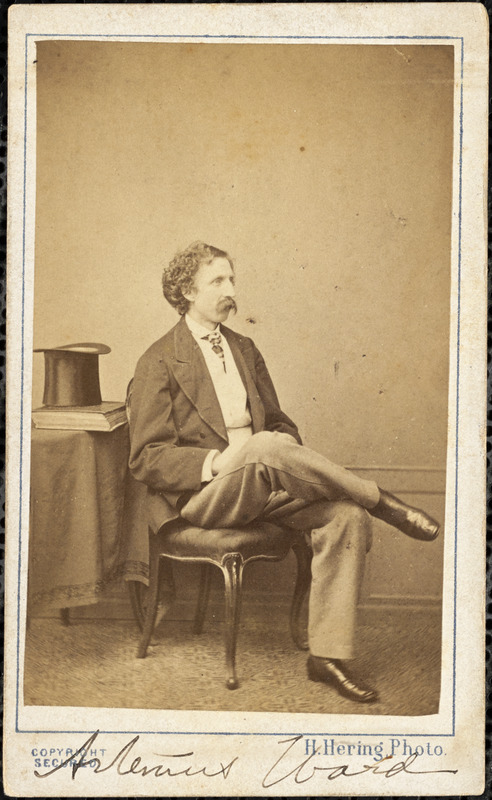
Artemus Ward, [ca. 1859–1867]. Carte de Visite Collection, Boston Public Library.

In 1860, he became editor of the first Vanity Fair periodical, a humorous New York weekly that failed in 1863. At about the same time, he began to appear as a lecturer who, by his droll and eccentric humor, attracted large audiences. Browne was also known as a member of the New York bohemian set which included leader Henry Clapp Jr., Walt Whitman, Fitz Hugh Ludlow, and actress Adah Isaacs Menken.

Though his books were popular, it was his lecturing, delivered with deadpan expression, that brought him fame.

In 1863, Browne came to San Francisco to perform as Artemus Ward. An early expert at show business publicity, Browne sent his manager ahead by several weeks to buy advertising in the local papers and promote the show among prominent citizens for endorsements. On November 13, 1863, Browne stood before a packed crowd at Platt's Music Hall, playing the part of Artemus Ward as an illiterate rube but with "Yankee common sense." Writer Bret Harte was in the audience that night and he described it in The Golden Era as capturing American speech:

humor that belongs to the country of boundless prairies, limitless rivers, and stupendous cataracts—that fun which overlies the surface of our national life, which is met in the stage, rail-car, canal and flat-boat, which bursts out over camp-fires and around bar-room stoves.

Artemus Ward was a favorite author of US President Abraham Lincoln. Before presenting "The Emancipation Proclamation" to his Cabinet, Lincoln read to them the latest episode, "Outrage in Utiky", also known as "High-Handed Outrage at Utica".

When Browne performed in Virginia City, Nevada, he met Mark Twain and the two became friends. In his correspondence with Twain, Browne called him "My Dearest Love." Legend has it that, following a stage performance there, Browne, Twain, and Dan De Quille were trekking on a (drunken) rooftop tour of Virginia City until a town constable threatened to blast all three with a shotgun loaded with rock salt. Browne recommended Twain to the editors of the New York Press and urged him to journey to New York.

In 1866, Browne visited England and attracted a large following to his playing Artemus Ward, both as lecturer and for his literary contributions to Punch.

== Personal life and demise ==
Within a year of being in England, his health deteriorated. He died of tuberculosis at Southampton on March 6, 1867. Browne was buried in England at Kensal Green Cemetery, but his remains were relocated to the US in 1868 and buried at Elm Vale Cemetery in Waterford, Maine.

== Legacy ==
In Cleveland, where Browne started his comedy career, an elementary school is named after him, known as Artemus Ward Elementary on W. 140th Street. In the American Garden of the Cleveland Cultural Gardens in Rockefeller Park, a monument of him was erected, next to Mark Twain.

== Works ==
=== Short stories ===
- A Visit to Brigham Young
- Women's Rights
- One of Mr Ward's Business Letters
- On "Forts"
- Fourth of July Oration
- High-Handed Outrage at Utica
- Artemus Ward and the Prince of Wales
- Interview with Lincoln
- Letters to his Wife

=== Artemus Ward books ===
- Artemus Ward His Book (1862) (full text online)
- Artemus Ward His Travels (1865) (full text online)
- Artemus Ward Among the Mormons (1865) (full text online)
- Artemus Ward in London (1867) (full text online)
- Artemus Ward's Panorama (1869) (full text online)
- Artemus Ward's Lecture (1869) (full text online)
