= Waterford Flat, Maine =

Coordinates: 44°10′53″N 70°43′02″W

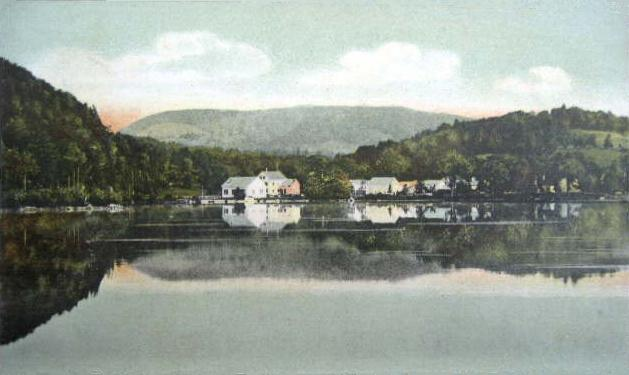
View of Waterford Flat in 1908

Waterford Flat is a historic village in the town of Waterford in Oxford County, Maine, United States. The village has been called by other names in its history, including Sweats Island, Sweet Island, Swetts Island, and Waterford. It is located north of Keoka Lake (or Thomas Pond).
