= Stow, Maine =

Town in Maine, United States

- Town
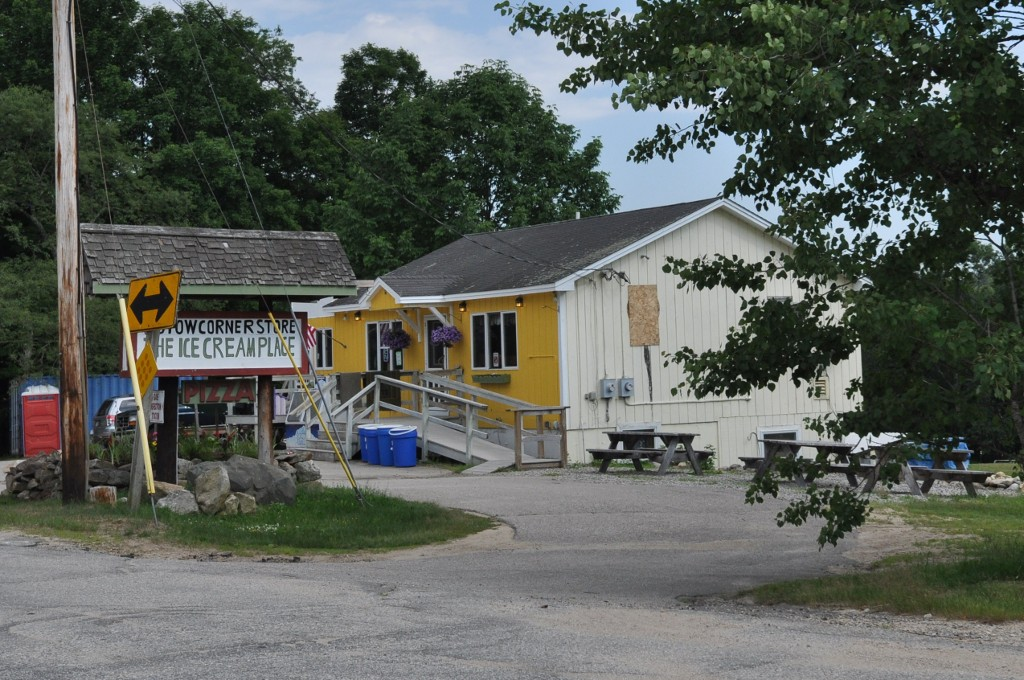
- The Corner Store

- Location within Maine Location within the United States
- Coordinates: 44°11′25″N 70°59′30″W
- Country: United States
- State: Maine
- County: Oxford

Area
  - Total: 24.34 sq mi (63.04 km^{2})
  - Land: 24.21 sq mi (62.70 km^{2})
  - Water: 0.13 sq mi (0.34 km^{2})
- Elevation: 502 ft (153 m)

Population (2020)
  - Total: 393
  - Density: 16/sq mi (6.3/km^{2})
- Time zone: UTC-5 (Eastern (EST))
  - Summer (DST): UTC-4 (EDT)
- ZIP Code: 04037
- Area code: 207
- FIPS code: 23-74685
- GNIS feature ID: 582752
- Website: www.stowmaine.us

Stow is a town in Oxford County, Maine, United States. The population was 393 at the 2020 census.

== Geography ==
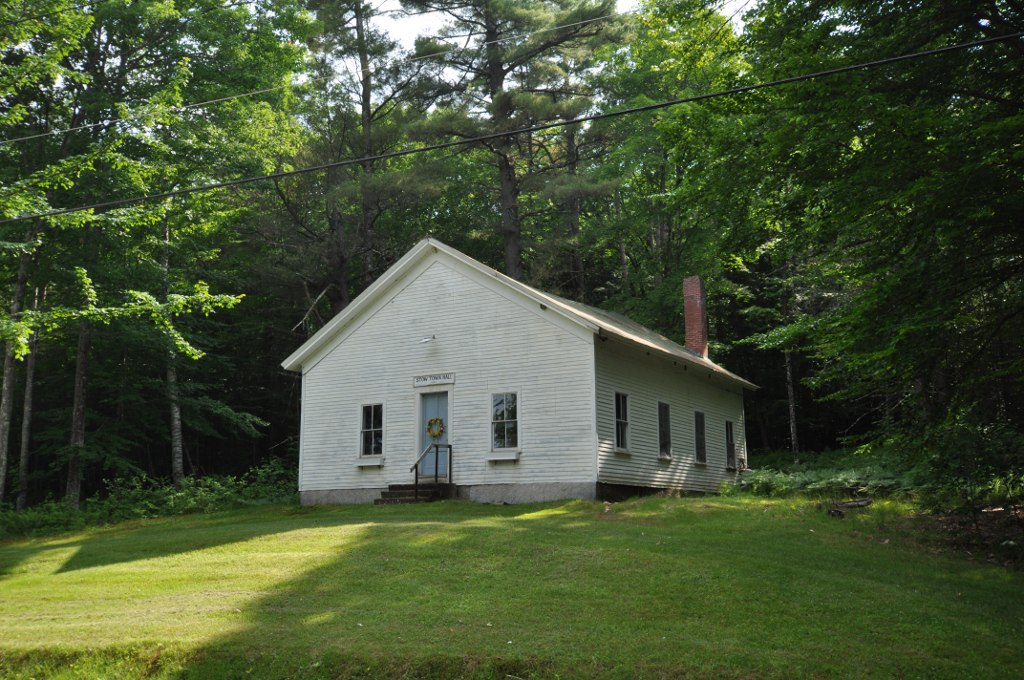
Stow Town Hall

According to the United States Census Bureau, the town has a total area of 24.34 square miles (63.04 km^{2}), of which 24.21 square miles (62.70 km^{2}) is land and 0.13 square miles (0.34 km^{2}) is water. The Bickford Slides waterfall is located on Bickford Brook within the town.

== Demographics ==
Historical population
Census	Pop.	Note	%±
1820	129		—
1830	165		27.9%
1840	376		127.9%
1850	471		25.3%
1860	551		17.0%
1870	427		−22.5%
1880	401		−6.1%
1890	291		−27.4%
1900	270		−7.2%
1910	224		−17.0%
1920	199		−11.2%
1930	161		−19.1%
1940	153		−5.0%
1950	147		−3.9%
1960	108		−26.5%
1970	100		−7.4%
1980	186		86.0%
1990	283		52.2%
2000	288		1.8%
2010	385		33.7%
2020	393		2.1%
U.S. Decennial Census

=== 2010 census ===
At the 2010 census, there were 385 people, 149 households and 109 families living in the town. The population density was 15.9 inhabitants per square mile (6.1/km^{2}). There were 232 housing units at an average density of 9.6 per square mile (3.7/km^{2}). The racial makeup of the town was 97.7% White, 0.8% African American, 0.3% Native American, and 1.3% from two or more races.

There were 149 households, of which 27.5% had children under the age of 18 living with them, 59.1% were married couples living together, 7.4% had a female householder with no husband present, 6.7% had a male householder with no wife present, and 26.8% were non-families. 21.5% of all households were made up of individuals, and 6.1% had someone living alone who was 65 years of age or older. The average household size was 2.47 and the average family size was 2.82.

The median age was 44 years. 22.3% of residents were under the age of 18; 7.6% were between the ages of 18 and 24; 21.2% were from 25 to 44; 34.6% were from 45 to 64; and 14.3% were 65 years of age or older. The gender makeup of the town was 52.2% male and 47.8% female.

=== 2000 census ===
At the 2000 census, there were 288 people, 115 households and 80 families living in the town. The population density was 11.8 per square mile (4.6/km^{2}). There were 181 housing units at an average density of 7.4 per square mile (2.9/km^{2}). The racial makeup of the town was 97.22% White, 0.35% African American, 1.04% Native American, 0.69% Asian, and 0.69% from two or more races. Hispanic or Latino of any race were 0.35% of the population.

There were 115 households, of which 33.9% had children under the age of 18 living with them, 62.6% were married couples living together, 3.5% had a female householder with no husband present, and 30.4% were non-families. 25.2% of all households were made up of individuals, and 9.6% had someone living alone who was 65 years of age or older. The average household size was 2.50 and the average family size was 3.03.

25.0% of the population were under the age of 18, 4.9% from 18 to 24, 30.6% from 25 to 44, 27.4% from 45 to 64, and 12.2% who were 65 years of age or older. The median age was 40 years. For every 100 females, there were 101.4 males. For every 100 females age 18 and over, there were 94.6 males.

The median household income was $27,125 and the median family income was $35,417. Males had a median income of $28,750 and females $18,750. The per capita income was $15,122. About 2.8% of families and 6.1% of the population were below the poverty line, including 8.5% of those under the age of eighteen and 15.8% of those 65 or over.
