= South Oxford, Maine =

- Unorganized territory
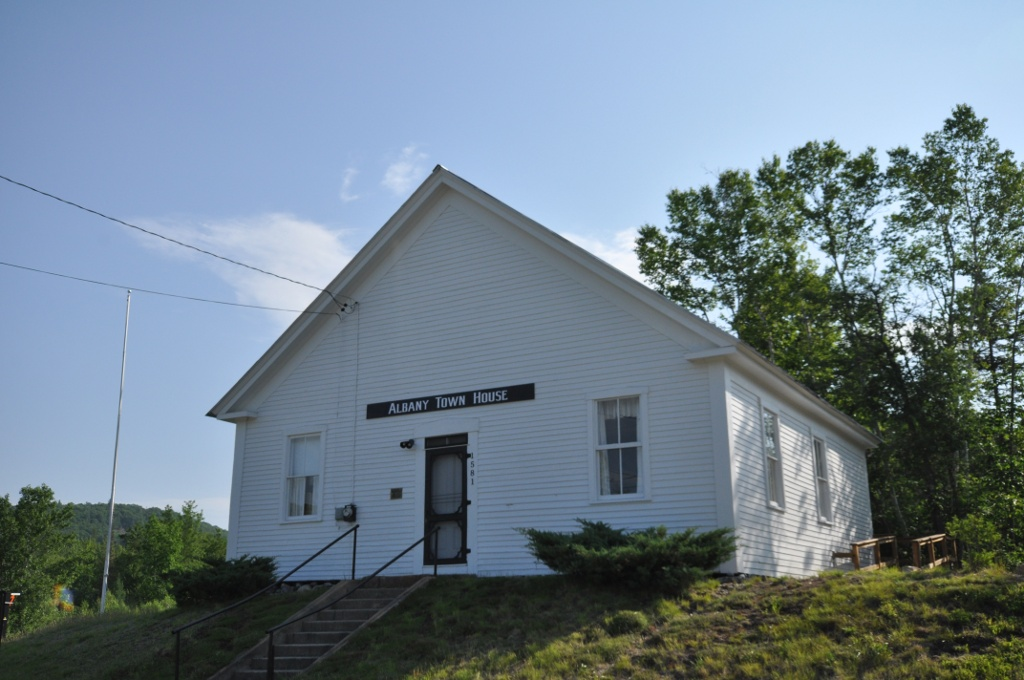
- Albany Town House

- Location within Maine Location within the United States
- Coordinates: 44°19′57″N 70°50′44″W
- Country: United States
- State: Maine
- County: Oxford

Area
  - Total: 95.7 sq mi (247.8 km^{2})
  - Land: 94.9 sq mi (245.9 km^{2})
  - Water: 0.73 sq mi (1.9 km^{2})
- Elevation: 1,660 ft (506 m)

Population (2020)
  - Total: 591
  - Density: 6.22/sq mi (2.40/km^{2})
- Time zone: UTC-5 (Eastern (EST))
  - Summer (DST): UTC-4 (EDT)
- ZIP Code: 04217 (Bethel)
- Area code: 207
- FIPS code: 23-71755
- GNIS feature ID: 582736

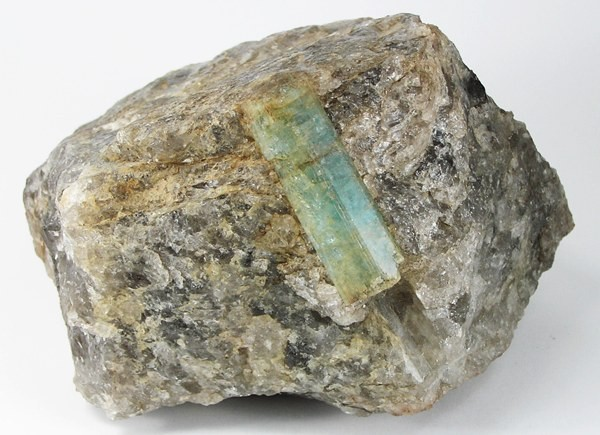
Beryl from Albany Township. This locality has produced beryl crystals up to 18 feet long.

South Oxford is an unorganized territory located in Oxford County, Maine, United States. The population was 591 at the 2020 census. The unorganized territory encompasses the areas designated under state law as Albany Township, Mason Township, and Batchelder's Grant. Albany and Mason were formerly incorporated as towns. Albany disincorporated in 1937 while Mason disincorporated in 1935.

Most of the unorganized territory lies within the White Mountain National Forest.

== Geography ==
According to the United States Census Bureau, the unorganized territory has a total area of 95.7 square miles (247.8 km^{2}), of which 94.9 square miles (245.9 km^{2}) is land and 0.7 square mile (1.9 km^{2}) (0.76%) is water.

== Demographics ==
Historical population
Census	Pop.	Note	%±
1970	184		—
1980	348		89.1%
1990	455		30.7%
2000	515		13.2%
2010	579		12.4%
2020	591		2.1%
U.S. Decennial Census

At the 2000 census there were 515 people, 206 households, and 138 families living in the unorganized territory. The population density was 5.4 inhabitants per square mile (2.1/km^{2}). There were 463 housing units at an average density of 4.9 per square mile (1.9/km^{2}). The racial makeup of the unorganized territory was 96.70% White, 1.17% Native American, 0.39% Asian, 0.39% from other races, and 1.36% from two or more races. Hispanic or Latino of any race were 0.78%.

Of the 206 households 31.1% had children under the age of 18 living with them, 55.8% were married couples living together, 5.8% had a female householder with no husband present, and 33.0% were non-families. 21.4% of households were one person and 9.2% were one person aged 65 or older. The average household size was 2.50 and the average family size was 2.88.

The age distribution was 25.0% under the age of 18, 6.0% from 18 to 24, 29.9% from 25 to 44, 27.6% from 45 to 64, and 11.5% 65 or older. The median age was 38 years. For every 100 females, there were 108.5 males. For every 100 females age 18 and over, there were 106.4 males.

The median household income was $40,750 and the median family income was $50,000. Males had a median income of $30,250 versus $19,297 for females. The per capita income for the unorganized territory was $19,425. About 9.1% of families and 15.5% of the population were below the poverty line, including 19.3% of those under age 18 and 17.6% of those age 65 or over.

== Education ==
The Maine Department of Education takes responsibility for coordinating school assignments in the unorganized territory. The state assigns the Albany, Batchelders Grant, and Mason areas to these schools of School Administrative District 44: Crescent Park Elementary, Woodstock Elementary, Telstar Middle School, and Telstar High School.
