= Oxford County, Maine =

County in Maine, United States

- County
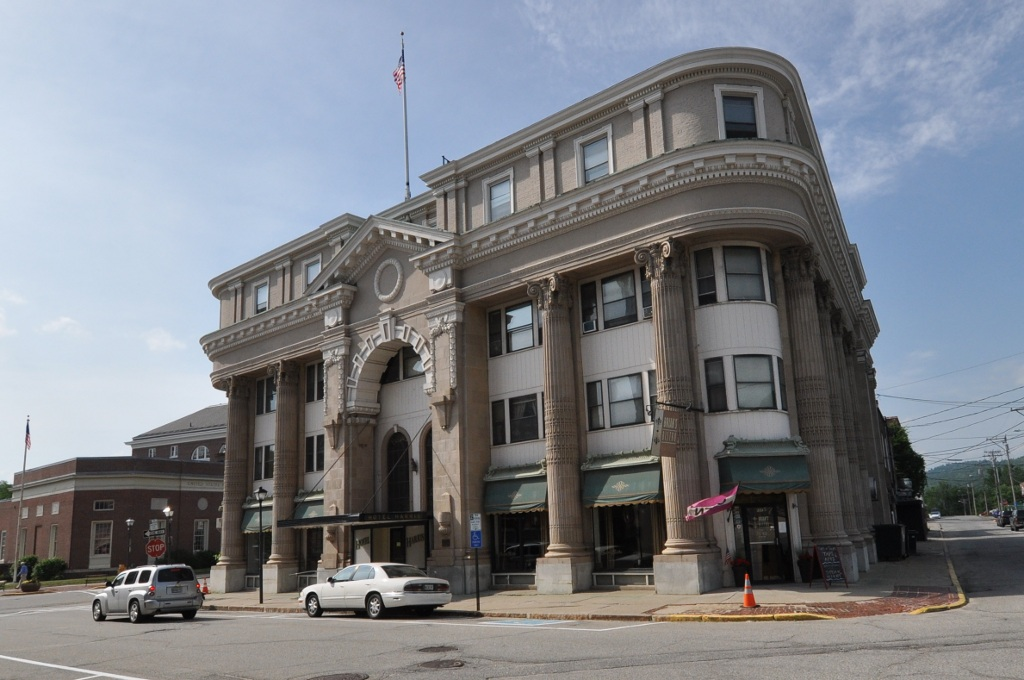
- Strathglass Building at Rumford, Maine.

- Seal

- Location within the U.S. state of Maine
- Coordinates: 44°19′28″N 70°42′19″W
- Country: United States
- State: Maine
- Founded: 1805
- Named for: Oxford, Massachusetts
- Seat: Paris
- Largest town: Rumford

Area
  - Total: 2,176 sq mi (5,640 km^{2})
  - Land: 2,077 sq mi (5,380 km^{2})
  - Water: 99 sq mi (260 km^{2}) 4.5%

Population (2020)
  - Total: 57,777
  - Estimate (2025): 60,346 ▲
  - Density: 27.82/sq mi (10.74/km^{2})
- Time zone: UTC−5 (Eastern)
  - Summer (DST): UTC−4 (EDT)
- Congressional district: 2nd
- Website: oxfordcounty.org

Oxford County is a county in the state of Maine, United States. As of the 2020 Census, the county had a population of 57,777. Its county seat is the town of Paris. The county was formed on March 4, 1805, by the Massachusetts General Court in the Maine District from northerly portions of York and Cumberland counties. It borders the Canadian province of Quebec.

== Geography ==
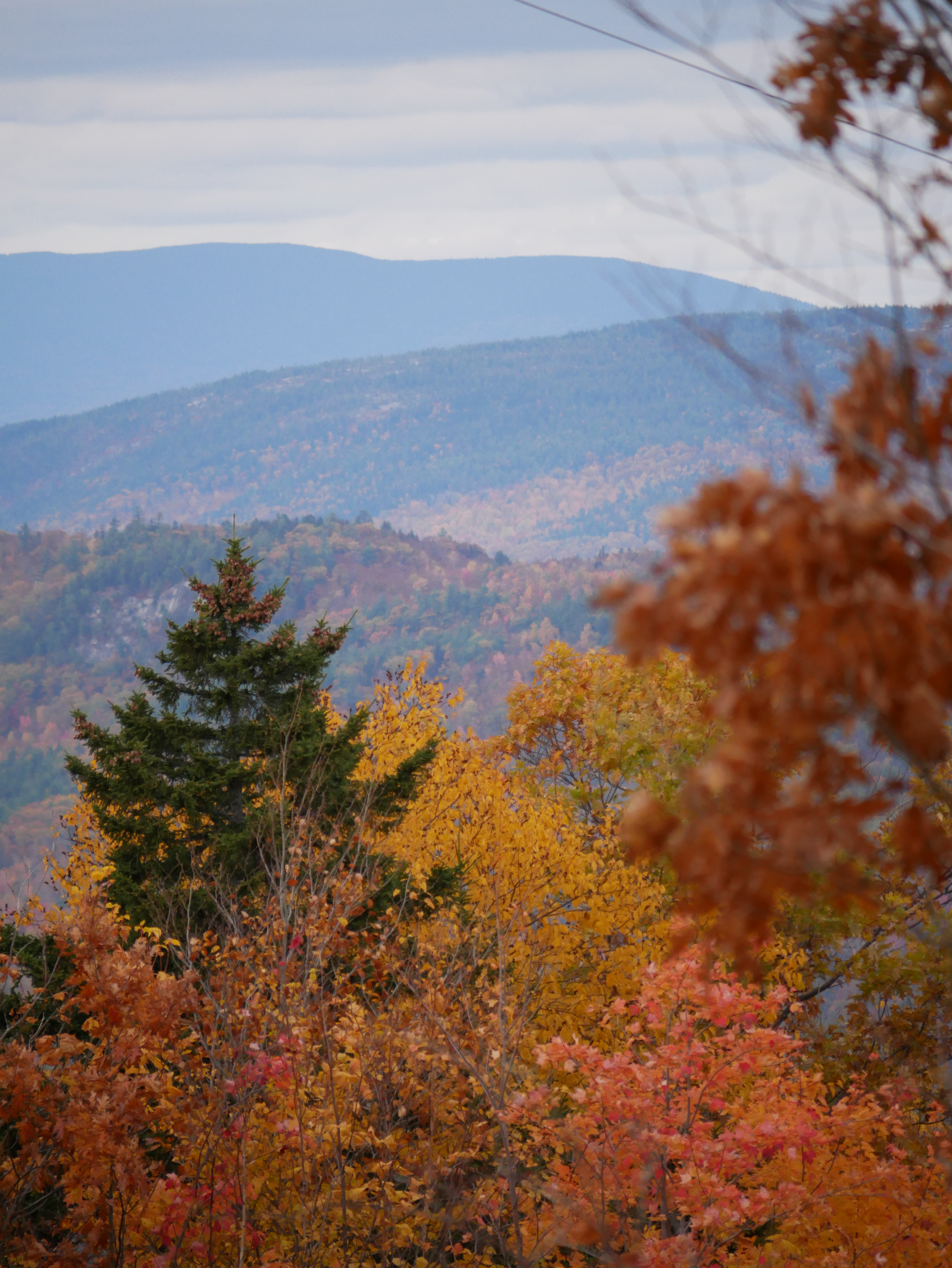
Typical fall landscape in Oxford County, ME.

According to the U.S. Census Bureau, the county has a total area of 2,176 square miles (5,640 km^{2}), of which 2,077 square miles (5,380 km^{2}) is land and 99 square miles (260 km^{2}) (4.5%) is water.

=== Adjacent counties and municipalities ===
- Franklin County – northeast
- Androscoggin County – east
- Cumberland County – southeast
- York County – south
- Carroll County, New Hampshire – southwest
- Coös County, New Hampshire – west
- Le Granit Regional County Municipality, Quebec – north

=== National protected areas ===
- Umbagog National Wildlife Refuge (part)
- White Mountain National Forest (part)

== Demographics ==
Historical population
Census	Pop.	Note	%±
1810	17,630		—
1820	27,104		53.7%
1830	35,219		29.9%
1840	38,351		8.9%
1850	39,763		3.7%
1860	36,698		−7.7%
1870	33,488		−8.7%
1880	32,627		−2.6%
1890	30,586		−6.3%
1900	32,238		5.4%
1910	36,256		12.5%
1920	37,700		4.0%
1930	41,483		10.0%
1940	42,662		2.8%
1950	44,221		3.7%
1960	44,345		0.3%
1970	43,457		−2.0%
1980	48,968		12.7%
1990	52,602		7.4%
2000	54,755		4.1%
2010	57,833		5.6%
2020	57,777		−0.1%
2025 (est.)	60,346	▲	4.4%
U.S. Decennial Census; 1790–1960 1900–1990; 1990–2000 2010–2016 2018

=== 2020 census ===
As of the 2020 census, the county had a population of 57,777. Of the residents, 19.3% were under the age of 18 and 22.8% were 65 years of age or older; the median age was 47.6 years. For every 100 females there were 98.6 males, and for every 100 females age 18 and over there were 96.9 males. 17.2% of residents lived in urban areas and 82.8% lived in rural areas.

The racial makeup of the county was 93.1% White, 0.4% Black or African American, 0.3% American Indian and Alaska Native, 0.5% Asian, 0.0% Native Hawaiian and Pacific Islander, 0.5% from some other race, and 5.1% from two or more races. Hispanic or Latino residents of any race comprised 1.5% of the population.

There were 24,712 households in the county, of which 25.0% had children under the age of 18 living with them and 24.2% had a female householder with no spouse or partner present. About 29.4% of all households were made up of individuals and 13.8% had someone living alone who was 65 years of age or older.

There were 36,130 housing units, of which 31.6% were vacant. Among occupied housing units, 76.1% were owner-occupied and 23.9% were renter-occupied. The homeowner vacancy rate was 2.0% and the rental vacancy rate was 6.5%.

Oxford County, Maine – Racial and ethnic composition Note: the US Census treats Hispanic/Latino as an ethnic category. This table excludes Latinos from the racial categories and assigns them to a separate category. Hispanics/Latinos may be of any race.
Race / Ethnicity (NH = Non-Hispanic)	Pop 2000	Pop 2010	Pop 2020	% 2000	% 2010	% 2020
White alone (NH)	53,588	55,584	53,456	97.86%	96.11%	92.52%
Black or African American alone (NH)	86	202	209	0.15%	0.34%	0.36%
Native American or Alaska Native alone (NH)	146	203	187	0.26%	0.35%	0.32%
Asian alone (NH)	196	355	275	0.35%	0.61%	0.47%
Pacific Islander alone (NH)	11	14	16	0.02%	0.02%	0.02%
Other race alone (NH)	22	62	157	0.04%	0.10%	0.27%
Mixed race or Multiracial (NH)	414	826	2,612	0.75%	1.42%	4.52%
Hispanic or Latino (any race)	292	587	865	0.53%	1.01%	1.49%
Total	54,755	57,833	57,777	100.00%	100.00%	100.00%

=== Ancestries ===
As of 2015, the largest self-reported ancestry groups in Oxford County, Maine were:

Largest ancestries (2015)	Percent
English (England)	22.6%
French (France) or French Canadian	20.9%
Irish (Republic of Ireland)	15.7%
"American" (United States)	8.9%
German (Germany)	6.5%
Scottish (Scotland)	5.6%
Italian (Italy)	4.9%
Polish (Poland)	1.9%

=== 2010 census ===
At the 2010 census, there were 57,833 people, 24,300 households, and 15,781 families living in the county. The population density was 27.8 inhabitants per square mile (10.7/km^{2}). There were 36,055 housing units at an average density of 17.4 units per square mile (6.7 units/km^{2}). The racial makeup of the county was 96.8% white, 0.6% Asian, 0.4% American Indian, 0.4% black or African American, 0.3% from other races, and 1.5% from two or more races. Those of Hispanic or Latino origin made up 1.0% of the population. In terms of ancestry, 23.6% were English, 14.8% were Irish, 8.2% were American, 6.4% were German, and 5.6% were French Canadian.

Of the 24,300 households, 28.1% had children under the age of 18 living with them, 49.0% were married couples living together, 10.4% had a female householder with no husband present, 35.1% were non-families, and 27.1% of households were made up of individuals. The average household size was 2.35 and the average family size was 2.81. The median age was 44.6 years.

The median household income was $39,748 and the median family income was $48,000. Males had a median income of $37,892 versus $30,187 for females. The per capita income for the county was $21,254. About 9.6% of families and 13.2% of the population were below the poverty line, including 17.6% of those under age 18 and 12.2% of those age 65 or over.

=== 2000 census ===
At the 2000 census there were 54,755 people, 22,314 households, and 15,173 families living in the county. The population density was 26 people per square mile (10 people/km^{2}). There were 32,295 housing units at an average density of 16 per square mile (6.2/km^{2}). The racial makeup of the county was 98.25% White, 0.17% Black or African American, 0.28% Native American, 0.37% Asian, 0.02% Pacific Islander, 0.11% from other races, and 0.80% from two or more races. 0.53% of the population were Hispanic or Latino of any race. 23.6% were of English, 13.9% French, 13.7% United States or American, 10.1% Irish and 8.4% French Canadian ancestry according to Census 2000. 95.9% spoke English and 2.6% French as their first language. Of the 22,314 households 30.40% had children under the age of 18 living with them, 54.10% were married couples living together, 9.50% had a female householder with no husband present, and 32.00% were non-families. 25.60% of households were one person and 11.00% were one person aged 65 or older. The average household size was 2.42 and the average family size was 2.87.

The age distribution was 24.20% under the age of 18, 6.50% from 18 to 24, 27.80% from 25 to 44, 25.50% from 45 to 64, and 16.10% 65 or older. The median age was 40 years. For every 100 females there were 95.40 males. For every 100 females age 18 and over, there were 93.70 males.

The median household income was $33,435 and the median family income was $39,794. Males had a median income of $30,641 versus $21,233 for females. The per capita income for the county was $16,945. About 8.30% of families and 11.80% of the population were below the poverty line, including 14.80% of those under age 18 and 10.10% of those age 65 or over.

== Politics ==
From 1880 to 1988, Oxford County was dominated by the Republican Party in presidential elections, only failing to back a Republican candidate in 1912 (the county backed Progressive Theodore Roosevelt, who was a former Republican), 1964 (backing Democrat Lyndon B. Johnson, who won every county in Maine in a 46-state landslide), and 1968 (backing Democrat Hubert Humphrey, who had chosen Oxford County native Edmund Muskie as his running mate). The county flipped in 1992 to become consistently Democratic like the rest of Maine, staying that way through 2012. However, it made a 27.8 point swing (the largest statewide) to back Republican Donald Trump in 2016 as he won Maine's second congressional district containing the county. Trump retained the county in 2020 and again in 2024, each time at increasing margins.

=== Voter registration ===
Voter registration and party enrollment as of March 2024
Unenrolled	13,102	33.69%
Republican	12,874	33.1%
Democratic	10,662	27.42%
Green Independent	1,957	5.03%
Libertarian	149	0.38%
No Labels	147	0.38%
Total	38,891	100%

United States presidential election results for Oxford County, Maine
Year	Republican		Democratic		Third party(ies)	
Year	No.	%	No.	%	No.	%
1908	4,179	64.53%	2,093	32.32%	204	3.15%
1912	1,234	16.69%	2,941	39.79%	3,217	43.52%
1916	4,026	51.73%	3,625	46.58%	131	1.68%
1920	7,301	64.59%	3,906	34.55%	97	0.86%
1924	7,062	69.90%	2,563	25.37%	478	4.73%
1928	9,409	69.75%	4,015	29.76%	66	0.49%
1932	8,264	52.73%	7,179	45.80%	230	1.47%
1936	8,778	57.13%	5,836	37.98%	752	4.89%
1940	8,656	53.49%	7,502	46.36%	25	0.15%
1944	8,053	55.76%	6,377	44.16%	12	0.08%
1948	7,444	58.24%	5,183	40.55%	155	1.21%
1952	11,575	66.62%	5,757	33.13%	43	0.25%
1956	12,607	73.04%	4,653	26.96%	0	0.00%
1960	11,715	56.69%	8,951	43.31%	0	0.00%
1964	5,340	28.14%	13,616	71.76%	19	0.10%
1968	8,030	41.66%	10,870	56.39%	375	1.95%
1972	12,114	64.36%	6,661	35.39%	48	0.26%
1976	10,551	49.04%	10,340	48.06%	625	2.90%
1980	11,041	47.04%	9,914	42.23%	2,519	10.73%
1984	15,408	64.34%	8,430	35.20%	110	0.46%
1988	13,568	55.91%	10,523	43.37%	175	0.72%
1992	8,194	27.91%	11,202	38.16%	9,960	33.93%
1996	7,238	27.74%	13,580	52.05%	5,273	20.21%
2000	11,835	43.05%	13,649	49.65%	2,009	7.31%
2004	14,196	45.00%	16,618	52.68%	732	2.32%
2008	12,863	40.64%	17,940	56.68%	847	2.68%
2012	11,996	40.77%	16,330	55.51%	1,094	3.72%
2016	16,210	51.95%	12,172	39.01%	2,819	9.03%
2020	17,698	52.84%	14,755	44.06%	1,039	3.10%
2024	19,228	55.59%	14,765	42.69%	597	1.73%

== Recreation ==
Oxford County is home to many summer camps. Some of these camps are Camp Wekeela, Kamp Kohut, Camp Wyonegonic, Forest Acres Camp for Girls and Maine Teen Camp.

== Communities ==
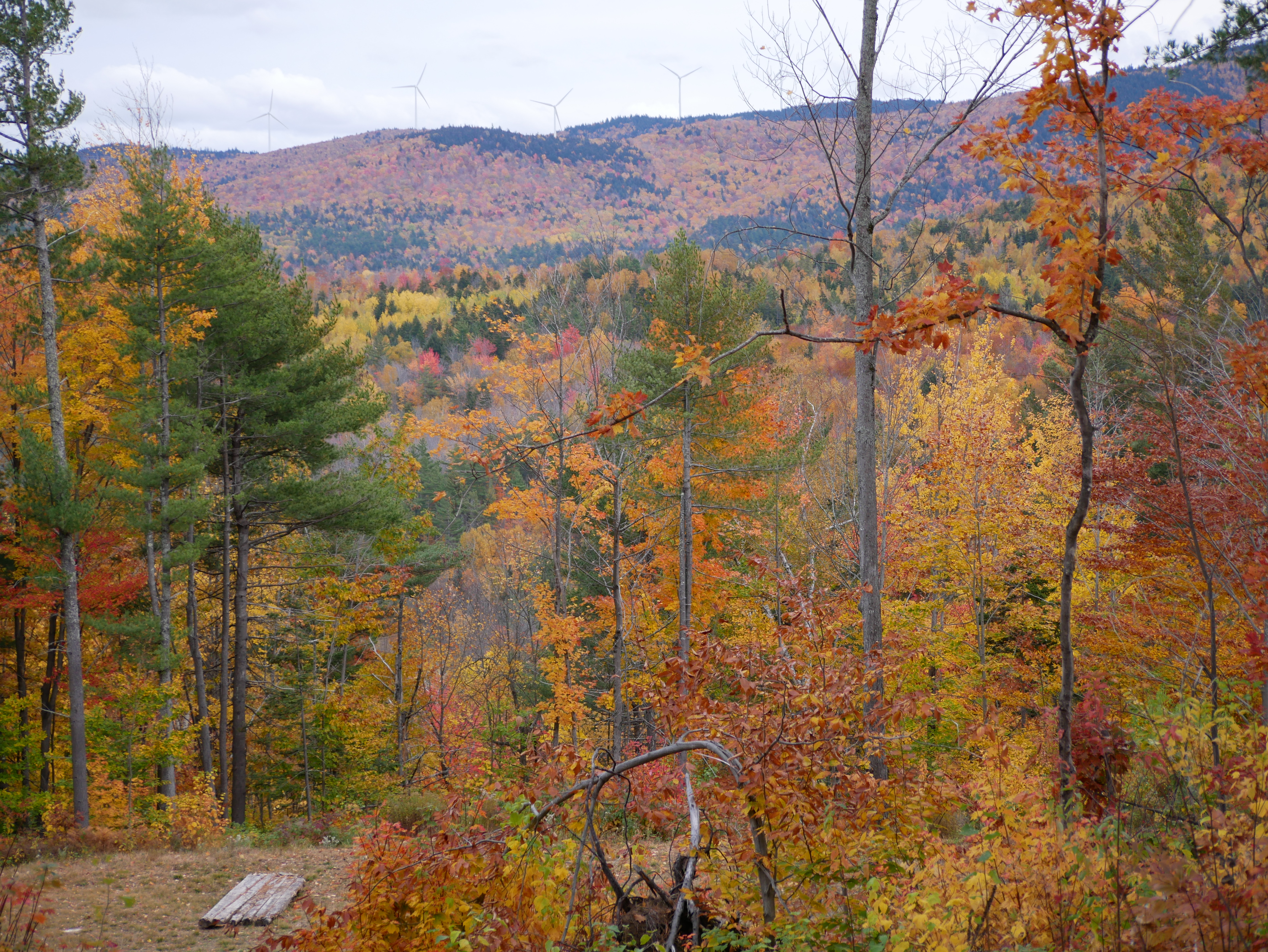
Spruce Mountain Wind Farm is one of three wind farms in Oxford County, ME.

=== Towns ===
- Andover
- Bethel
- Brownfield
- Buckfield
- Byron
- Canton
- Denmark
- Dixfield
- Fryeburg
- Gilead
- Greenwood
- Hanover
- Hartford
- Hebron
- Hiram
- Lovell
- Mexico
- Newry
- Norway
- Otisfield
- Oxford
- Paris (county seat)
- Peru
- Porter
- Roxbury
- Rumford
- Stoneham
- Stow
- Sumner
- Sweden
- Upton
- Waterford
- West Paris
- Woodstock

=== Plantations ===
- Lincoln Plantation
- Magalloway (former)

=== Unorganized territories ===
- North Oxford
- South Oxford
- Milton

=== Census-designated places ===
- Bethel
- Dixfield
- Fryeburg
- Kezar Falls
- Mexico
- Norway
- Oxford
- Rumford
- South Paris

=== Other unincorporated communities ===
- Center Lovell
- Dickvale
- Magalloway
- North Waterford
- Waterford Flat
- West Bethel

== Education ==
School districts include:

- Andover Public Schools
- Byron Public Schools
- Gilead School District
- Lincoln Plantation School District
- Upton School District
- Regional School Unit 10
- Regional School Unit 56
- Regional School Unit 78
- School Administrative District 17
- School Administrative District 44
- School Administrative District 55
- School Administrative District 72

There is also the Oxford Unorganized Territory. Unorganized territory is not in any municipality. The Maine Department of Education takes responsibility for coordinating school assignments in the unorganized territory.

== See also ==
- National Register of Historic Places listings in Oxford County, Maine
