= Maine State Route 145 =

State highway in Franklin County, Maine, US

State Route 145

Route information
- Maintained by MaineDOT
- Length: 10.03 mi (16.14 km)
- Existed: 1925–present

Major junctions
- South end: SR 4 in Strong
- SR 149 / SR 234 in Strong
- North end: SR 142 near Kingfield

Location
- Country: United States
- State: Maine
- Counties: Franklin

Highway system
- Maine State Highway System; Interstate; US; State; Auto trails; Lettered highways
| ← SR 144 | → SR 146 |

State Route 145 (SR 145) is part of Maine's system of numbered state highways. It runs ten miles (16 km) from an intersection with SR 4 in Strong to an intersection with SR 142 near Kingfield. The route is also known as Main Street in Strong.

== Major junctions ==
The entire route is in Franklin County.

| Location | mi | km | Destinations | Notes |
|---|---|---|---|---|
| Strong | 0.00 | 0.00 | SR 4 (Farmington Road / Phillips Road) – Farmington, Phillips, Rangeley | |
| Strong | 0.40 | 0.64 | SR 149 / SR 234 east (Norton Hill Road) – Phillips, New Vineyard | Western terminus of SR 234 |
| East Central Franklin | 10.03 | 16.14 | SR 142 – Phillips, Kingfield | |
1.000 mi = 1.609 km; 1.000 km = 0.621 mi
