= Maine State Route 149 =

State highway in Franklin County, Maine, US

State Route 149

Route information
- Maintained by MaineDOT
- Length: 15.9 mi (25.6 km)

Major junctions
- South end: SR 4 in Farmington
- North end: SR 142 in Phillips

Location
- Country: United States
- State: Maine
- Counties: Franklin

Highway system
- Maine State Highway System; Interstate; US; State; Auto trails; Lettered highways
| ← SR 148 | → SR 150 |

State Route 149 (SR 149) is a state highway in the U.S. state of Maine. The highway runs 15.9 miles (25.6 km) along the western banks of the Sandy River entirely in Franklin County. It complements SR 4, which runs on the east side of the river. SR 149 travels through Fairbanks (a neighborhood within Farmington), Strong, and Phillips.

== Route description ==
SR 149 begins at an intersection in the Fairbanks neighborhood of Farmington at SR 4. The road, named South Strong Road, heads northwest and north past small houses before traveling into a wooded area east of the Sandy River. While traveling through this area, the road climbs and descends rolling hills. After passing through the settlement of South Strong, SR 149 continues traveling through forested areas before climbing a small hill to intersect SR 234 (Norton Hill Road). SR 149 and SR 234 form a concurrency and travel into downtown Strong along Norton Hill Road. At North Main Street, which carries SR 145, SR 234 ends but SR 149 continues along Lambert Hill Road first northwest, then west. As it descends a hill, it enters the town of Avon on River Road and then travels closer to the river than before. On this portion, SR 149 passes to the north small farms along the riverbed whilst passing south of wooded bluffs. After curving to the northwest, it enters Phillips and passes a line of small houses. It makes a 90-degree bend to the south to cross the Sandy River on a narrow bridge. It makes another 90-degree bend to the west to travel along Main Street through Phillips's business district. SR 149 ends at SR 142 about 450 feet (140 m) to the northwest of SR 4.

== Major junctions ==
The entire route is in Franklin County.

| Location | mi | km | Destinations | Notes |
|---|---|---|---|---|
| Farmington | 0.0 | 0.0 | SR 4 (Fairbanks Road) – Farmington, Rangeley | |
| Strong | 7.9 | 12.7 | SR 234 east (Norton Hill Road) – New Vineyard | Southern end of SR 234 concurrency |
| Strong | 8.2 | 13.2 | SR 145 (North Main Street) / SR 234 ends – Rangeley, Kingfield | Northern end of SR 234 concurrency |
| Phillips | 15.9 | 25.6 | SR 142 (Park Street) to SR 4 – Rangeley, Kingfield | |
1.000 mi = 1.609 km; 1.000 km = 0.621 mi: Concurrency terminus
