= Maine State Route 148 =

State highway in the U.S. state of Maine

State Route 148

Route information
- Maintained by MaineDOT
- Length: 19.0 mi (30.6 km)

Major junctions
- West end: SR 43 in Industry
- US 201A / SR 8 / SR 43 from Anson to Madison
- East end: US 201 in Madison

Location
- Country: United States
- State: Maine
- Counties: Franklin, Somerset

Highway system
- Maine State Highway System; Interstate; US; State; Auto trails; Lettered highways
← SR 147	→ SR 149

State Route 148 (SR 148) is a 19-mile-long (31 km) state highway in the U.S. state of Maine. Running through portions of Franklin and Somerset counties, it connects SR 43 in the town of Industry with Madison at U.S. Route 201 (US 201).

== Route description ==
SR 148 begins at a stop-controlled intersection with SR 43 at Goodrich Corner, a rural settlement within the town of Industry. The road heads north mostly through forested areas though it skirts the easterly edges of small hills and passes to the east of Clearwater Pond. After passing a small farm with numerous work buildings, SR 148 makes a 90-degree bend to head east to the settlement of West Mills. Continuing east, the highway briefly enters the town of Starks in Somerset County and curves to the north. It briefly reenters Industry, Franklin County before curving back to the east to cross Lemon Creek and into Anson, Somerset County. It continues traveling through mostly wooded areas before reaching the settlement of Five Points where it intersects and forms a concurrency with SR 43 towards downtown Anson. The two routes enter the more urbanized area of Anson on Main Street passing a post office and the town hall before curving to the north at Kennebec River. The road reaches an intersection with US 201A and SR 8; at this point, the four routes cross the river into Madison.

After crossing the river, Main Street, carrying the four numbered routes, passes a factory, crosses a railroad, and enters the central business district of Madison. After passing numerous restaurants, offices, and churches, Main Street reaches an intersection with Weston Avenue and Old Point Avenue. US 201A and SR 8 head south along Old Point Avenue, SR 43 heads north along Weston Avenue, while SR 148 continues east along Main Street. SR 148 passes a few more businesses and some schools, but is mostly passing through a residential neighborhood. Upon exiting the center of the town, the road heads through a more rural area, though many homes and some businesses line the road. It passes the front of Madison Area Memorial High School before heading through the settlements of Ellis Corner and Martin Corner. At the settlement of White School Corner, SR 148 ends at US 201 (Lakewood Road) though the road continues east as White School House Road towards the southern shore of Wesserunsett Lake.

== Major junctions ==
County	Location	mi	km	Destinations	Notes
Franklin	Industry	0.0	0.0	SR 43 (Industry Road) / O'Dell Road – Starks, Farmington	
Somerset	No major junctions				
Franklin	No major junctions				
Somerset	Anson	11.3	18.2	SR 43 west (Starks Road) – Farmington	Western end of SR 43 concurrency
Somerset	Anson	12.7	20.4	US 201A north / SR 8 north (Main Street) – Kingfield, Sugarloaf Area	Western end of US 201A / SR 8 concurrency
Somerset	Madison	13.2	21.2	US 201A south / SR 8 south (Old Point Avenue) / SR 43 east (Weston Avenue) – Athens, Norridgewock	Eastern end of US 201A / SR 43 concurrencies
Somerset	Madison	19.0	30.6	US 201 (Lakewood Road) / White School House Road	
1.000 mi = 1.609 km; 1.000 km = 0.621 mi: Concurrency terminus
