= Maine State Route 234 =

State highway in central Maine, US

State Route 234

Route information
- Maintained by MaineDOT
- Length: 18.51 mi (29.79 km)
- Existed: 1956–present

Major junctions
- West end: SR 149 in Strong
- SR 27 in New Vineyard
- East end: US 201A / SR 8 in Anson

Location
- Country: United States
- State: Maine
- Counties: Franklin, Somerset

Highway system
- Maine State Highway System; Interstate; US; State; Auto trails; Lettered highways
← SR 233	→ SR 235

State Route 234 (SR 234) is a state highway located in central Maine. It begins at an intersection with SR 149 in Strong and runs east for 18.51 miles (29.79 km) to U.S. Route 201A (US 201A) and SR 8 in Anson. SR 234 exists in two separate segments connected by a two-mile (3.2 km) section of SR 27.

== Route description ==
SR 234 begins at the Sandy River just east of downtown Strong as a spur from SR 149, which connects with SR 4 and SR 145 in the town center before running south on the east bank of the river. SR 234 heads due east on Norton Hill Road, passing to the south of Porter Lake and crossing into New Vineyard, where it becomes Lake Street and intersect SR 27 (New Vineyard Road). SR 234 turns north onto SR 27 and the two routes run concurrently for two miles (3.2 km) before SR 234 turns east again onto Anson Valley Road towards the town of Anson in Somerset County. In Anson, SR 234 briefly runs along the southern bank of the Carrabassett River before terminating in North Anson at US 201A / SR 8 near their intersection with SR 16 and the confluence of the Carrabassett and Kennebec rivers.

Signage as of September 2013 indicates a concurrency of SR 149 and SR 234 heading northwest into downtown Strong. However, state route logs do not show this concurrency.

== History ==
SR 234 was designated in 1956 over entirely new routing. Its alignment has not changed since.

== Junction list ==
County	Location	mi	km	Destinations	Notes
Franklin	Strong	0.00	0.00	SR 149 (South Strong Road / Norton Hill Road) – Strong, Fairbanks, Farmington	
Franklin	New Vineyard	5.31	8.55	SR 27 south (New Vineyard Road) – Farmington	Western terminus of SR 27 concurrency
Franklin	New Vineyard	7.36	11.84	SR 27 north (New Vineyard Road) – Kingfield	Eastern terminus of SR 27 concurrency
Somerset	Anson	18.51	29.79	US 201A / SR 8 (River Road) – North Anson, Madison	
1.000 mi = 1.609 km; 1.000 km = 0.621 mi: Concurrency terminus
