= Maine State Route 142 =

State highway in Maine, US

State Route 142

Route information
- Maintained by MaineDOT
- Length: 42.86 mi (68.98 km)
- Existed: 1925–present

Major junctions
- South end: US 2 / SR 17 in Dixfield
- SR 156 in Weld; SR 4 / SR 149 in Phillips; SR 145 in Freeman Township
- North end: SR 16 / SR 27 in Kingfield

Location
- Country: United States
- State: Maine
- Counties: Oxford, Franklin

Highway system
- Maine State Highway System; Interstate; US; State; Auto trails; Lettered highways
← SR 141	→ SR 143

State Route 142 (SR 142) is a numbered state highway in the U.S. state of Maine that runs from U.S. Route 2 (US 2) and SR 17 in Dixfield to SR 16 and SR 27 in Kingfield.

== Route description ==
The route begins at its southern terminus in Dixfield. It heads north through Carthage before turning left at SR 156 in Weld. It goes north again before turning right onto a 1.3-mile-long (2.1 km) concurrency with SR 4 in Phillips. It turns left twice there before going northwest to Kingfield, then another left turn leads to the route's northern terminus.

== Major junctions ==
County	Location	mi	km	Destinations	Notes
Oxford	Dixfield	0.00	0.00	US 2 / SR 17 (Main Street)	
Franklin	Weld	14.01	22.55	SR 156 east (School Street) / Center Hill Road – Wilton	Western terminus of SR 156
Franklin	Phillips	26.15	42.08	SR 4 north – Rangeley	Southern end of SR 4 concurrency
Franklin	Phillips	27.45	44.18	SR 4 south – Farmington	Northern end of SR 4 concurrency
Franklin	Phillips	27.53	44.31	SR 149 east (Main Street)	Western terminus of SR 149
Franklin	East Central Franklin	39.23	63.13	SR 145 south (Foster Hill Road) – Strong	Northern terminus of SR 145
Franklin	Kingfield	42.86	68.98	SR 16 / SR 27 (Main Street) – Eustis, Farmington	
1.000 mi = 1.609 km; 1.000 km = 0.621 mi: Concurrency terminus
