= Senator Morrison (disambiguation) =

Cameron A. Morrison (1869–1953) was a U.S. senator from North Carolina from 1930 to 1932.

Senator Morrison may also refer to:

- Amos Morrison (1908–1989), Nebraska State Senate
- Dorilus Morrison (1814–1897), Minnesota State Senate
- J. Blaine Morrison (died 1943), Maine State Senate
- James L. D. Morrison (1816–1888), Illinois State Senate
- Julie Morrison (born 1956), Illinois State Senate
- Kathryn Morrison (politician) (1942–2013), Wisconsin State Senate
- Kelly Morrison (born 1969), Minnesota State Senate
- Sid Morrison (1933–2026), Washington State Senate
- Tommy Morrison (politician) (born 1975), Senate of Guam
