= Maine School Administrative District 9 =

Regional school district in Franklin County, Maine

Maine School Administrative District 9 (MSAD 9) is a regional school district in Franklin County, Maine, United States, with a portion in Kennebec County. It covers the towns of Chesterville, Farmington, Industry, New Sharon, New Vineyard, Starks, Temple, Vienna, Weld, and Wilton.

MSAD 9 recently became RSU 9.

== Schools ==
=== High schools ===
- Mount Blue High School

=== Middle schools ===
- Mt. Blue Middle School

=== Elementary schools ===
- Academy Hill School
- Cape Cod Hill School
- Cascade Brook School
- Cushing School
- W.G. Mallett School

=== Special schools ===
- Foster Career and Technical Education Center
- Franklin County Adult Education
