= Maine State Route 146 =

State highway in Maine, United States

State Route 146

Route information
- Maintained by MaineDOT
- Length: 6.28 mi (10.11 km)
- Existed: 1925–present

Major junctions
- West end: SR 27 in New Portland
- East end: SR 16 in New Portland

Location
- Country: United States
- State: Maine
- Counties: Somerset

Highway system
- Maine State Highway System; Interstate; US; State; Auto trails; Lettered highways
← SR 145	→ SR 147

State Route 146 (SR 146) is a short state route in the U.S. state of Maine. It is located entirely in the town of New Portland in Somerset County. It was first established in 1925 and the route has not changed since.

== Junction list ==
The entire route is in New Portland, Somerset County.

mi	km	Destinations	Notes
0.00	0.00	SR 27 (Lemon Stream Road / Carrabassett Road) / Chick Road – New Vineyard, Kingfield	
6.28	10.11	SR 16 (Bog Road) – Kingfield, North New Portland	
1.000 mi = 1.609 km; 1.000 km = 0.621 mi
