= Strong, Maine =

- Town
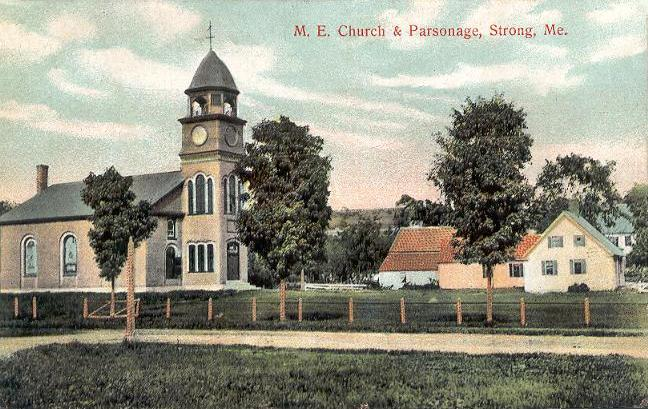
- Methodist Episcopal Church and Parsonage, Strong, Maine

- Seal
- Motto: Toothpick Capital of the World
- Location within the state of Maine
- Coordinates: 44°47′35″N 70°13′48″W
- Country: United States
- State: Maine
- County: Franklin
- Incorporated: 1801
- Communities: Strong; South Strong

Area
  - Total: 28.94 sq mi (74.95 km^{2})
  - Land: 28.35 sq mi (73.43 km^{2})
  - Water: 0.59 sq mi (1.53 km^{2})
- Elevation: 774 ft (236 m)

Population (2020)
  - Total: 1,122
  - Density: 40/sq mi (15.3/km^{2})
- Time zone: UTC-5 (Eastern (EST))
  - Summer (DST): UTC-4 (EDT)
- ZIP code: 04983
- Area code: 207
- FIPS code: 23-74825
- GNIS feature ID: 582753
- Website: strong-maine.com

Strong is a town in Franklin County, Maine, United States. The population was 1,122 at the 2020 census. Strong is home to the annual Sandy River Festival.

== History ==
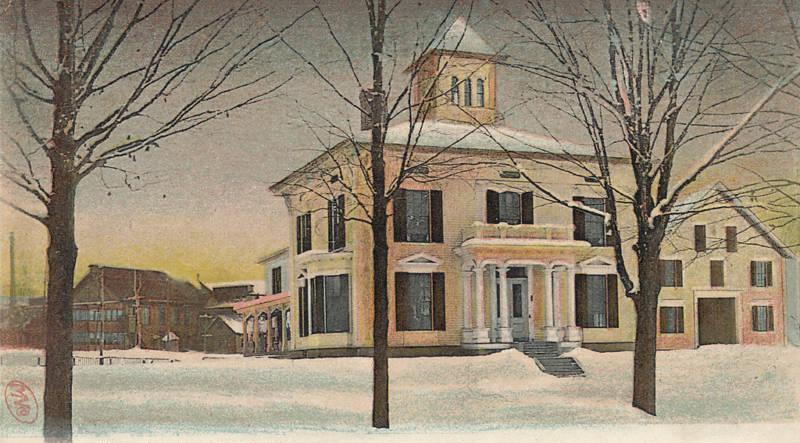
The Hotel Strong in 1905

The plantation was called Township No. 3, First Range North of Plymouth Claim, West of Kennebec River (or T3 R1 NPC WKR), then successively known as Middletown and Readstown. It was first settled in 1784 by William Read from Nobleboro. Readstown was incorporated on January 31, 1801, and named for Caleb Strong, a Founding Father of the United States and governor of Massachusetts. The Maine Republican Party was founded here on August 7, 1854.

Set on a hilly intervale above a big bend in the Sandy River, the area provided fertile soil for agriculture. Farmers grew hay, wheat, corn, oats and potatoes. The northeast branch of the Sandy River provided water power for mills, helping make Strong prosperous. By 1859, when the population was 1,008, it had sawmills, a gristmill, a fulling mill, a carding machine, a starch factory and a tannery.

The narrow gauge Sandy River Railroad connected Farmington and Phillips in 1879. By 1886, town industries included a boot and shoe factory, machine shops, Maine's first cheese factory, a clothespin manufacturer, a maker of cane seat chair bottoms, and an excelsior factory. It was noted as "one of the prettiest villages in the county."

Strong was called "Toothpick Capital of the World" due to the productivity of the Strong Wood Products Incorporated plant, which once manufactured 20 million toothpicks per day.

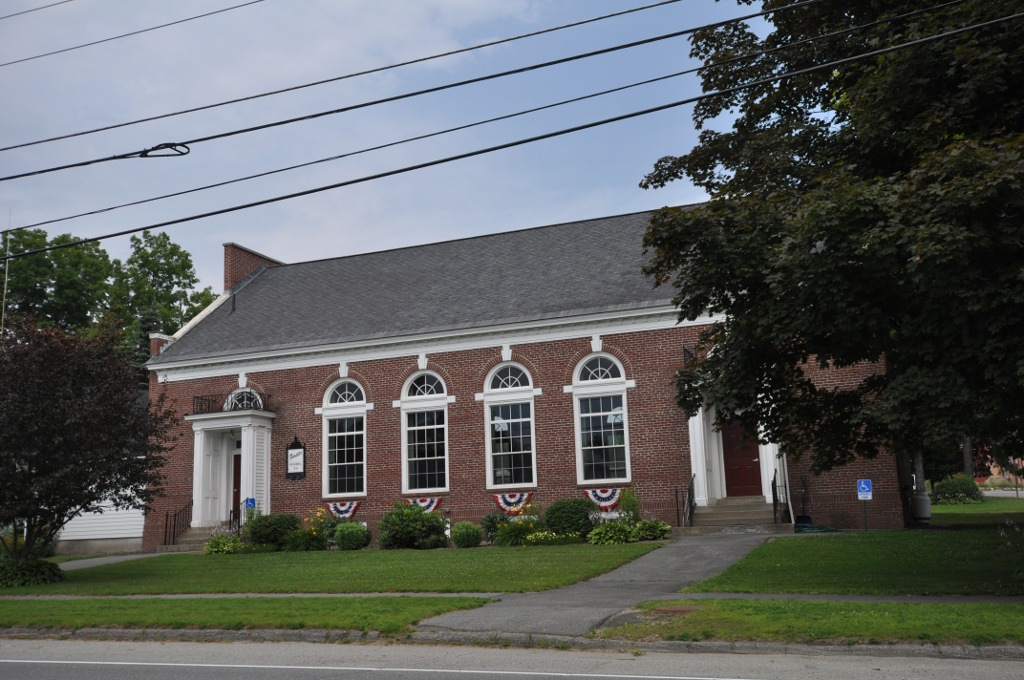
Forster Memorial Hall (town offices and library)

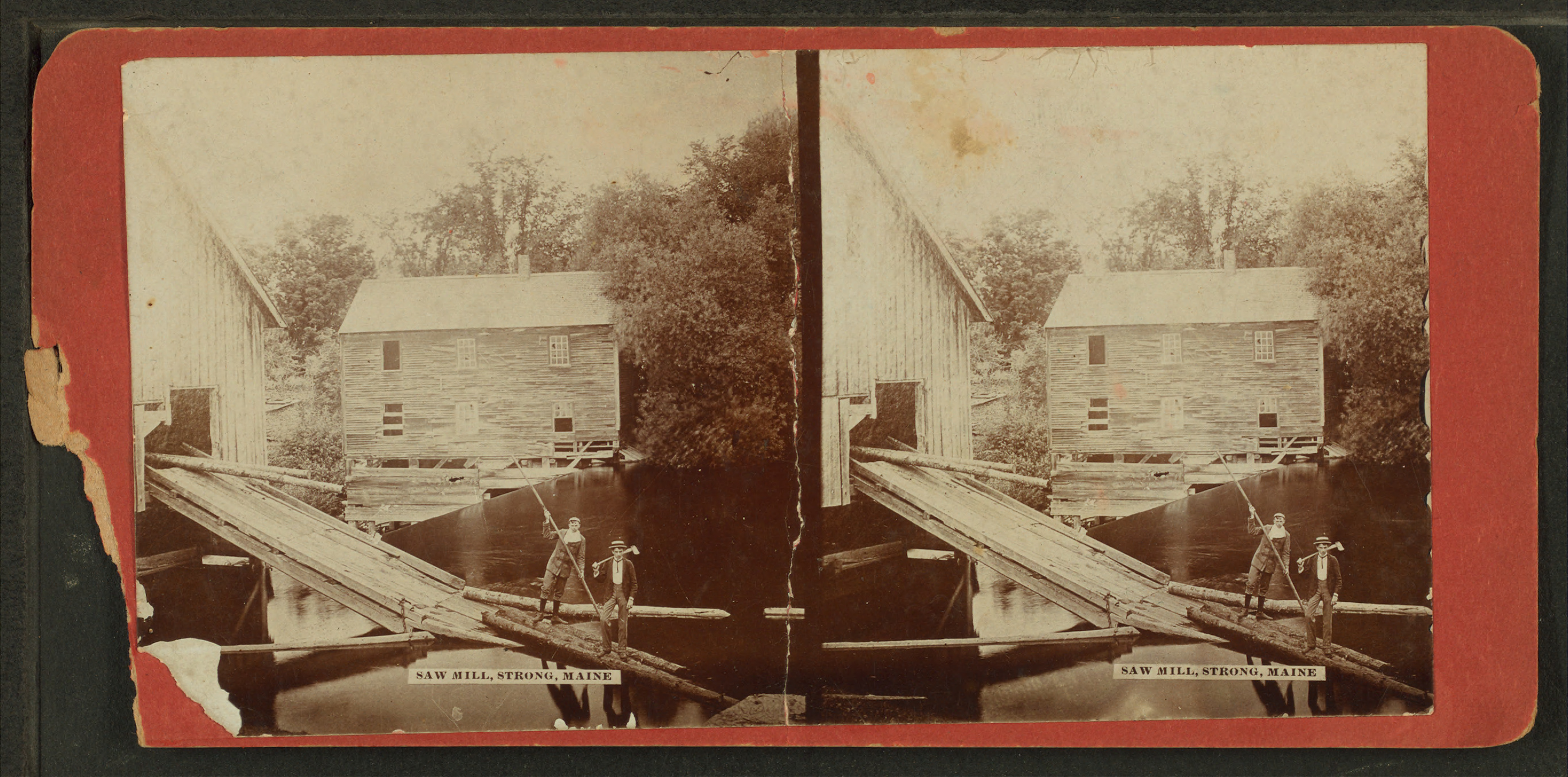
Sawmill c. 1870s

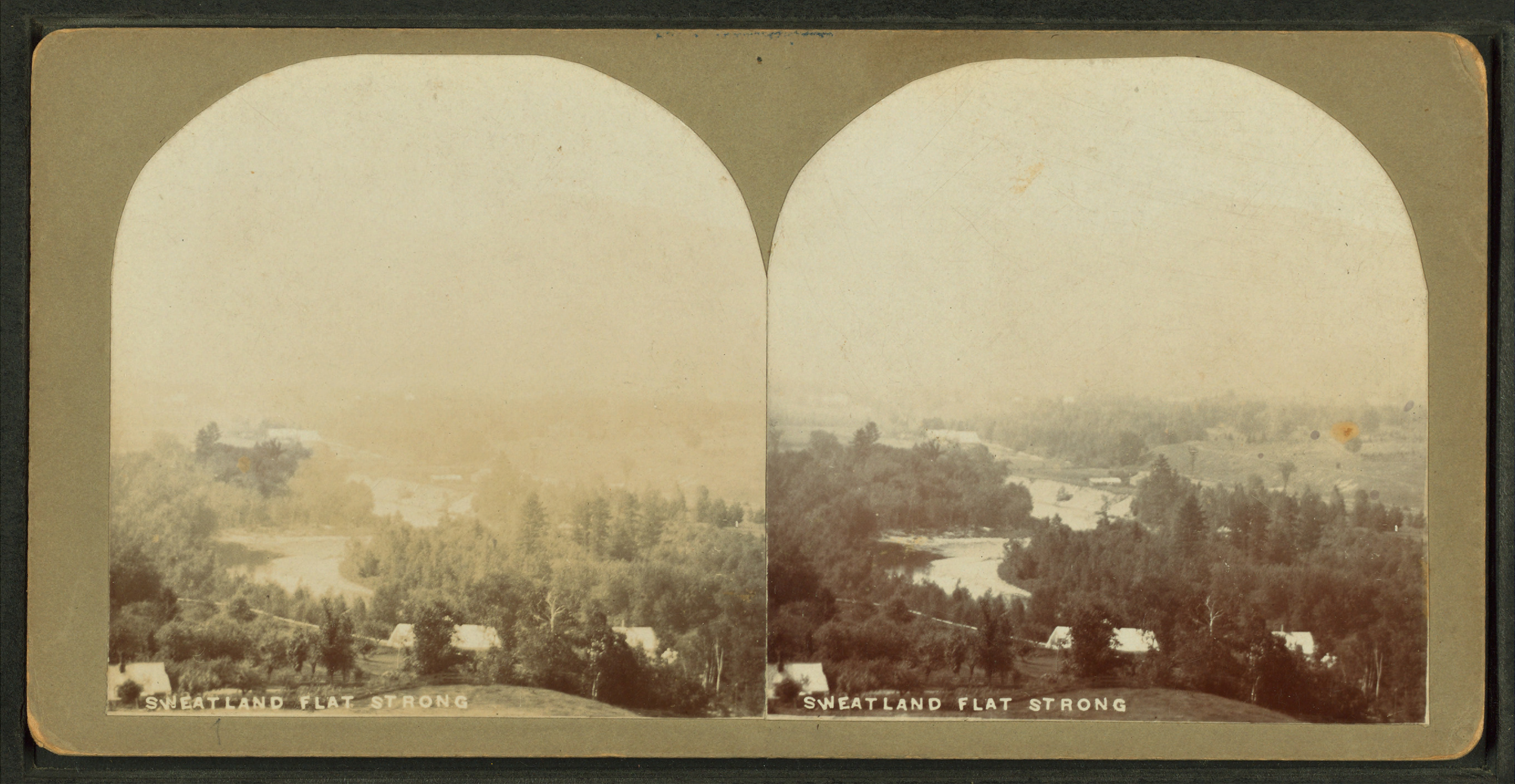
Sweatland Flat

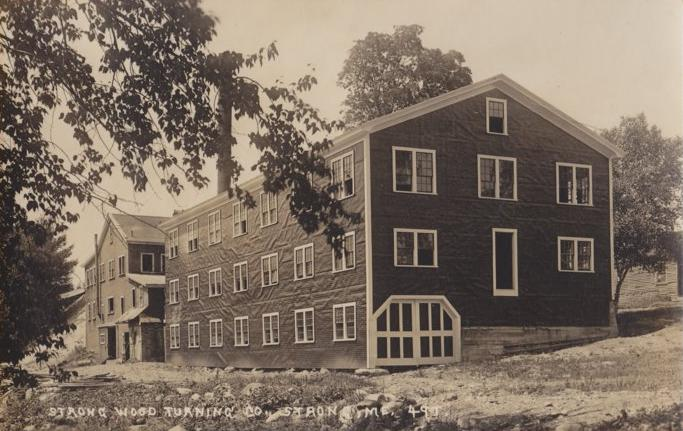
Wood Turning Co. c. 1920

== Geography ==
According to the United States Census Bureau, the town has a total area of 28.94 square miles (74.95 km^{2}), of which 28.35 square miles (73.43 km^{2}) is land and 0.59 square miles (1.53 km^{2}) is water. Strong is located above a bend in the Sandy River, a tributary of the Kennebec River.

The town borders the towns of New Vineyard to the east, Farmington to the south, and Temple and Avon to the west, and Freeman Township to the north.

Strong is crossed by state routes 4, 145, 149 and 234.

== Demographics ==
Historical population
Census	Pop.	Note	%±
1810	424		—
1820	862		103.3%
1830	985		14.3%
1840	1,109		12.6%
1850	1,008		−9.1%
1860	754		−25.2%
1870	634		−15.9%
1880	596		−6.0%
1890	627		5.2%
1900	637		1.6%
1910	720		13.0%
1920	779		8.2%
1930	878		12.7%
1940	1,007		14.7%
1950	1,036		2.9%
1960	976		−5.8%
1970	1,132		16.0%
1980	1,506		33.0%
1990	1,217		−19.2%
2000	1,259		3.5%
2010	1,213		−3.7%
2020	1,122		−7.5%
U.S. Decennial Census

=== 2010 census ===
As of the census of 2010, there were 1,213 people, 496 households, and 339 families living in the town. The population density was 42.8 inhabitants per square mile (16.5/km^{2}). There were 634 housing units at an average density of 22.4 per square mile (8.6/km^{2}). The racial makeup of the town was 97.1% White, 0.4% African American, 0.5% Native American, 0.2% Asian, 0.1% Pacific Islander, and 1.6% from two or more races. Hispanic or Latino of any race were 1.2% of the population.

There were 496 households, of which 30.8% had children under the age of 18 living with them, 54.0% were married couples living together, 9.5% had a female householder with no husband present, 4.8% had a male householder with no wife present, and 31.7% were non-families. 23.2% of all households were made up of individuals, and 11.3% had someone living alone who was 65 years of age or older. The average household size was 2.45 and the average family size was 2.85.

The median age in the town was 41.5 years. 22.5% of residents were under the age of 18; 7.8% were between the ages of 18 and 24; 24.3% were from 25 to 44; 30.1% were from 45 to 64; and 15.4% were 65 years of age or older. The gender makeup of the town was 51.2% male and 48.8% female.

=== 2000 census ===
As of the census of 2000, there were 1,259 people, 498 households, and 343 families living in the town. The population density was 43.8 inhabitants per square mile (16.9/km^{2}). There were 614 housing units at an average density of 21.4 per square mile (8.3/km^{2}). The racial makeup of the town was 99.21% White, 0.16% African American, 0.32% Native American, 0.08% Asian, 0.08% from other races, and 0.16% from two or more races. Hispanic or Latino of any race were 1.27% of the population.

There were 498 households, out of which 30.7% had children under the age of 18 living with them, 54.2% were married couples living together, 9.8% had a female householder with no husband present, and 31.1% were non-families. 23.3% of all households were made up of individuals, and 11.8% had someone living alone who was 65 years of age or older. The average household size was 2.49 and the average family size was 2.92.

In the town, the population was spread out, with 25.3% under the age of 18, 7.0% from 18 to 24, 26.8% from 25 to 44, 26.5% from 45 to 64, and 14.3% who were 65 years of age or older. The median age was 39 years. For every 100 females there were 98.3 males. For every 100 females age 18 and over, there were 89.9 males.

The median income for a household in the town was $30,568, and the median income for a family was $36,250. Males had a median income of $26,111 versus $18,636 for females. The per capita income for the town was $14,232. About 9.0% of families and 15.3% of the population were below the poverty line, including 17.3% of those under age 18 and 10.7% of those age 65 or over.

== Notable people ==
- Elizabeth Akers Allen, author, journalist, poet
- Ben C. Eastman, US congressman
- John A. Eastman, Wisconsin state senator
- Julia Harris May (1833–1912), poet, teacher, school founder
- Nathaniel W. Milliken, Wisconsin state assemblyman
- James Porter (1847–1876), military officer who died at Custer's Last Stand
