= Maine State Route 4 =

State highway in Maine, US

State Route 4
- Route of SR 4 highlighted in red

Route information
- Maintained by MaineDOT
- Length: 168.85 mi (271.74 km)
- Existed: 1931–present

Major junctions
- South end: NH 4 in Rollinsford, NH
- US 202 / SR 4A / SR 111 in Alfred; US 302 in Windham; I-95 / Maine Turnpike in Gray/Auburn; US 202 / SR 11 / SR 100 in Auburn; US 2 in Wilton; US 2 / SR 27 in Farmington; SR 16 in Rangeley
- North end: Haines Landing in Rangeley

Location
- Country: United States
- State: Maine
- Counties: York, Cumberland, Androscoggin, Franklin

Highway system
- Maine State Highway System; Interstate; US; State; Auto trails; Lettered highways
← SR 3	→ SR 5

State Route 4 (SR 4) is a 168.85-mile (271.74 km) long state highway located in southern and western Maine. It is a major interregional route and the first such route to be designated in the state. The southern terminus is at the New Hampshire border in South Berwick, where it connects to New Hampshire Route 4, and the northern terminus is at Haines Landing on Mooselookmeguntic Lake in Rangeley. Major cities and towns along the length of SR 4 include Sanford, Gorham, Windham, Auburn and Farmington.

== Route description ==
=== South Berwick to Alfred ===
SR 4 begins at the New Hampshire state line where NH 4 crosses into South Berwick. It has a brief concurrency with SR 236 in the downtown area before splitting off to the northeast. SR 4 runs in a northeasterly direction paralleling the Downeaster right of way into North Berwick, where it junctions with SR 9 and has a concurrency through the town, then turns nearly due north. SR 4 passes through the city of Sanford, bypassing the downtown area to the east. It meets SR 4A (a former alignment of SR 4) and SR 109 at a traffic circle, with those routes providing downtown access. Continuing north into Alfred, SR 4 junctions with U.S. Route 202 (US 202), SR 4A and SR 111.

=== Alfred to Auburn (concurrency with US 202) ===
US 202 east joins SR 4 north and the two routes begin a lengthy concurrency. Entering Waterboro, US 202 and SR 4 meet SR 5, turning east to join SR 5 into Lyman before splitting off to the northeast. Continuing into Hollis, a separate segment of SR 4A begins as the highway crosses SR 35, and SR 117 joins US 202 and SR 4 to form another three-way concurrency. The road crosses the Saco River into Buxton, and SR 117 immediately splits off to the south. US 202 and SR 4 bypass downtown Buxton to the south, with access available via SR 112 and the east end of the SR 4A loop. The highway crosses SR 22 on the way out of town. Entering the town of Gorham, US 202 and SR 4 cross SR 112 again before entering the downtown area and junction with SR 25, a major interregional route connecting to Portland and points west. The three routes are cosigned along Main Street, crossing SR 114 in the center of town. Continuing northeast, US 202 and SR 4 split from SR 25, then cross SR 237 before crossing the Presumpscot River into Windham. In Windham, the highway passes through the town center before intersecting with US 302 at a traffic circle. Continuing northeast, US 202 and SR 4 are joined by SR 115 as they cross into the town of Gray. The highway meets SR 26A, a bypass of Gray Village, then interchanges with Interstate 95 (the Maine Turnpike) at exit 63. SR 26A is cosigned with US 202, SR 4 and SR 115 into the village center, forming a short four-route concurrency. In the village, the highway junctions with SR 26 and SR 100, both major interregional routes. SR 115 splits off here and SR 100 north joins US 202 and SR 4. Now paralleling I-95 to its east, the highway continues through New Gloucester, where it meets the northern end of SR 231, and then into the city of Auburn. US 202, SR 4 and SR 100 enter Auburn as Washington Street and meet the eastern end of SR 122 before interchanging with I-95 again at exit 75. Crossing the Little Androscoggin River and continuing towards downtown, the highway meets SR 11 and SR 121 at a rotary intersection. Continuing north onto Minot Avenue, SR 11 joins US 202, SR 4 and SR 100 for 0.71 miles (1.14 km) into downtown Auburn. At Court Street, US 202 turns east along with SR 11 and SR 100 towards Lewiston, leaving SR 4 after a 56.23-mile (90.49 km) concurrency.

=== Auburn to Farmington ===
SR 4 continues north on Union Street and then Center Street and Turner Road, staying on the Auburn side of the Androscoggin River. SR 4 has an interchange with the Veterans Memorial Bridge Connector freeway and continues due north into the town of Turner. SR 4 crosses the Nezinscot River and SR 117 again near the town's center. SR 4 crosses SR 219 in the northeast corner of town before continuing into Livermore, where it has a short concurrency with SR 108. SR 4 does cross the Androscoggin River into Livermore Falls, where it junctions with SR 17 in the downtown area. SR 4 and SR 17 are cosigned north into the town of Jay, where they run along the east bank of the river to an intersection with SR 140. In North Jay, SR 4 splits from SR 17 and continues north into Wilton, where it junctions with US 2. SR 4 turns east to join US 2 and the two routes bypass downtown Wilton, with access via SR 156. Continuing into the town of Farmington, US 2 and SR 4 gradually turn north towards downtown, intersecting with SR 133 south of town. In downtown Farmington, SR 43 joins from the west and the road crosses the Sandy River to junction with SR 27. US 2 turns south onto SR 27 while SR 4 and SR 43 join SR 27 north.

=== Farmington to Rangeley ===
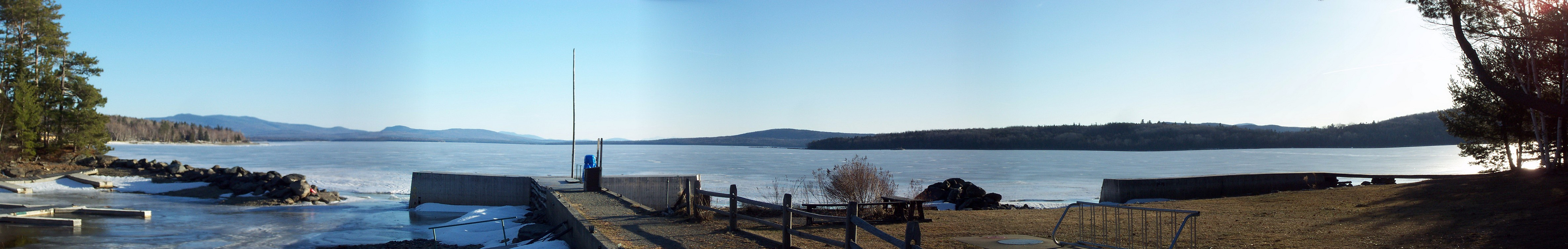
Mooselookmeguntic Lake, as viewed from the northern terminus of SR 4 (facing west) at Haines Landing.

Continuing north out of downtown Farmington, SR 43 splits off to the east, with SR 4 and SR 27 maintaining a northward course along the Sandy River. A few miles to the north, SR 27 splits off to the northeast, while SR 4 turns northwest and junctions with SR 149 before crossing the Sandy River again. In the town of Strong, SR 4 and SR 149 straddle opposite sides of the river as it proceeds north, then turns west. Both routes junction with SR 145 near the center of town, and continue west through Avon and into Phillips. In Phillips, SR 149 crosses the river and terminates at SR 142. SR 142 has a concurrency with SR 4 before splitting off to the west. SR 4 continues northwest along the Sandy River, passing through a series of unincorporated townships and plantations without any major junctions. SR 4 runs along the east side of Rangeley Lake as it enters the town of Rangeley and junctions with SR 16. SR 4 turns west and joints SR 16, running along the north side of the lake into the town center, before SR 16 splits off to the north. Crossing the Rangeley River into downtown, SR 4 has its last major northbound junction at the western end of SR 17. The road continues west until it dead-ends at Haines Landing on Mooselookmeguntic Lake.

== History ==
=== Background of interregional route experiment ===
When the modern state highway system was first implemented in Maine in 1925, all state highways which did not cross state lines were assigned numbers 100 and up. This was to avoid conflicts with the New England road marking system, which had been adopted in the other New England states in 1922. All of the New England routes used one- or two-digit numbers that were retained across state lines. The New England route system was supplanted in 1926 by the U.S. Numbered Highway System, but the New England routes that did not become U.S. Routes were redesignated as state highways with the existing numbers. These numbering conventions were used regardless of a route's length, so interregional travel that did not involve the New England interstate routes or new U.S. Routes could involve using several different three-digit routes.

In 1931, the Maine State Highway Commission sought to rectify this problem by conducting an experiment in which it would designate a new low-numbered state highway which ran mostly on existing alignments of the original 1925 three-digit intrastate routes, replacing and/or overlapping the original numbers along those alignments. This would effectively create a long interregional route that could cover an important travel corridor with a single route number. SR 4 was the first interregional route to be designated as part of this experiment. The number 4 was chosen because the route was originally intended to be a northward extension of US 4 from Dover, New Hampshire, but the American Association of State Highway and Transportation Officials (AASHTO) never accepted the proposal and US 4 was ultimately routed south and east to its present terminus in Portsmouth. Despite this, the project ultimately proved to be a success and the new route was kept in place. The interregional routes were expanded in 1933-34 with a state-wide renumbering, including several other new route designations being introduced, and some of the original New England routes being given longer routings (the most significant of those being SR 11).

=== Original route of SR 4 and subsequent changes ===
As first designated in 1931, SR 4 extended from its present terminus at the New Hampshire state line to the Coburn Gove-Woburn Border Crossing, running the entire length of western Maine. It was designated on a new routing between South Berwick and North Berwick. From North Berwick, it replaced former SR 214 which extended into downtown Sanford at SR 109, then was cosigned with SR 11 (which, at the time, still ran east to Biddeford) to Alfred at SR 4A (which, at the time, bypassed Sanford to the east). From there, it displaced former SR 111 which ran as far as the SR 25 junction in Gorham. A new routing was used from Gorham to Gray, then SR 4 was cosigned with existing SR 115 and SR 100 into Auburn. From Auburn, SR 4 replaced SR 107 which extended to Rangeley as SR 4 does today, except for the short extension to Haines Landing which SR 4 did not initially occupy. This short section of road became part of SR 16 in 1933, then was designated as a second iteration of SR 144 in 1936. From the town center of Rangeley, SR 4 replaced former SR 144 (modern SR 16, not related to the "new" SR 144 in Rangeley) which ran northeast to Eustis, and a new routing along local roads (modern SR 27) to the Quebec border crossing. When SR 16 was designated in 1933-34, it was cosigned with SR 4 from Rangeley to Eustis, meeting the northern end of the newly designated SR 27 in Eustis.

State Route 144
- Location: Rangeley
- Length: 1.51 mi (2.43 km)
- Existed: 1936–1951

In 1937-38, US 202 (designated in 1936) and SR 4 were moved from their original alignment in Hollis, Bar Mills, and Buxton onto a bypass alignment to the south. The original alignment became the northern segment of SR 4A.

In 1946-47, SR 4 was truncated to its junction with SR 16 on the east side of Rangeley, eliminating the overlap between the two routes. SR 27 was extended north from its original terminus in Eustis north to the Canadian border along the original alignment of SR 4. Around the same time, the designations of SR 4 and SR 4A in Sanford were swapped, with SR 4 assuming the eastern bypass route and SR 4A running west into downtown with SR 109, then north to Alfred along US 202.

In 1951, SR 4 was again cosigned with SR 16 along the north side of Rangeley Lake, then extended west to Haines Landing, replacing the second iteration of SR 144.

== Junction list ==
County	Location	mi	km	Destinations	Notes
York	South Berwick	0.00	0.00	NH 4 west (Portland Avenue) – Dover NH	Continuation beyond New Hampshire state line
York	South Berwick	0.34	0.55	SR 236 south (Harold L. Dow Highway) – Eliot, Kittery	Southern terminus of SR 236 concurrency
York	South Berwick	0.54	0.87	SR 236 north (Main Street) – Berwick	Northern terminus of SR 236 concurrency
York	Berwick	1.32– 4.21	2.12– 6.78	No major junctions	
York	North Berwick	6.51	10.48	SR 9 west (Somersworth Road) – Berwick, Somersworth NH	Southern terminus of SR 9 concurrency
York	North Berwick	6.98	11.23	SR 9 east (Wells Street) – Wells	Northern terminus of SR 9 concurrency
York	Sanford	14.49	23.32	SR 4A north / SR 109 (Main Street) – Wells, Sanford	Rotary; southern terminus of SR 4A (southern segment)
York	Alfred	18.97	30.53	US 202 west / SR 4A south (Sanford Road) – Sanford SR 111 east (Biddeford Road) – Lyman	Southern terminus of US 202 concurrency; northern terminus of SR 4A (southern segment); western terminus of SR 111
York	Waterboro	26.89	43.28	SR 5 north (Sokokis Trail) – Limerick	Southern terminus of wrong-way concurrency with SR 5
York	Lyman	28.73	46.24	SR 5 south (New County Road) – Saco	Northern terminus of wrong-way concurrency with SR 5
York	Hollis	32.15	51.74	SR 4A north / SR 35 (Little Falls Road/Main Street) – Kennebunk, Bar Mills, Standish	Southern terminus of SR 4A (northern segment)
York	Hollis	32.63	52.51	SR 117 north (Cape Road) – Limington	Southern terminus of wrong-way concurrency with SR 117
York	Buxton	34.36	55.30	SR 117 south (Joy Valley Road) – Saco	Northern terminus of wrong-way concurrency with SR 117
York	Buxton	35.43	57.02	SR 112 (Beech Plains Road) – Bar Mills, Saco	
York	Buxton	36.30	58.42	SR 4A south (Main Street) – Bar Mills	Northern terminus of SR 4A (northern segment)
York	Buxton	38.03	61.20	SR 22 (Long Plains Road) – Buxton, South Portland, Scarborough	
Cumberland	Gorham	41.49	66.77	SR 112 to SR 114 / SR 25 – Scarborough, Standish	Rotary
Cumberland	Gorham	42.37	68.19	SR 25 west (State Street) – Standish	Southern terminus of SR 25 concurrency
Cumberland	Gorham	42.57	68.51	SR 114 (South Street/School Street) – Scarborough, Sebago Lake	
Cumberland	Gorham	43.03	69.25	SR 25 east (Main Street) to I-95 – Westbrook	Northern terminus of SR 25 concurrency
Cumberland	Gorham	46.29	74.50	SR 237 (Mosher Road/Newell Street) – Westbrook, Standish	Rotary
Cumberland	Windham	51.65	83.12	US 302 (Roosevelt Trail) – Portland, Bridgton	Rotary
Cumberland	Gray	55.38	89.13	SR 115 west (Windham Road) – North Windham	Southern terminus of SR 115 concurrency
Cumberland	Gray	58.73	94.52	SR 26A north (Maine Wildlife Park Way) to SR 26 north – South Paris, Poland Spring, Bethel	Southern terminus of wrong-way concurrency with SR 26A
Cumberland	Gray	58.73– 59.00	94.52– 94.95	I-95 / Maine Turnpike – Portland, Augusta, Boston	Exit 63 on Maine Turnpike
Cumberland	Gray	59.17	95.22	SR 26 south / SR 100 south (Portland Road) – Portland SR 115 east (Yarmouth Road) – Yarmouth; SR 26A	Southern terminus of SR 26A; northern terminus of SR 115 concurrency; southern terminus of SR 26 / SR 100 concurrency
Cumberland	Gray	59.22	95.31	SR 26 north (Shaker Road) – Norway	Northern terminus of SR 26 concurrency
Cumberland	New Gloucester	66.79	107.49	SR 231 south (Intervale Road) – New Gloucester	Northern terminus of SR 231
Androscoggin	Auburn	69.44	111.75	SR 122 west (Poland Spring Road) – Poland	Eastern terminus of SR 122
Androscoggin	Auburn	70.45	113.38	I-95 / Maine Turnpike – Portland, Augusta, Boston	Exit 75 on Maine Turnpike
Androscoggin	Auburn	74.49	119.88	SR 11 / SR 121 south (Minot Avenue) – Minot, Mechanic Falls	Southern terminus of SR 11 concurrency; northern terminus of SR 121
Androscoggin	Auburn	75.20	121.02	US 202 east / SR 11 north / SR 100 north (Court Street) – Lewiston, Augusta	Northern terminus of US 202 / SR 11 / SR 100 concurrency To SR 126 / SR 196
Androscoggin	Auburn	76.87	123.71	To US 202 (Memorial Bridge) / SR 11 / SR 100 / SR 126 / SR 196 – Lewiston, Augusta	Interchange
Androscoggin	Turner	86.67	139.48	SR 117 (Turner Center Road / Buckfield Road) – Winthrop, Buckfield	
Androscoggin	Turner	92.94	149.57	SR 219 (Howes Corner Road / Bear Pond Road) – Leeds, Wayne, Hartford	
Androscoggin	Livermore	95.86	154.27	SR 108 west (Church Street) – Rumford	Southern terminus of SR 108 concurrency
Androscoggin	Livermore	96.90	155.95	SR 108 east (Boothby Road) – Augusta, Wayne	Northern terminus of SR 108 concurrency
Androscoggin	Livermore Falls	103.76	166.99	SR 17 south (Main Street) to SR 133 – Winthrop, Augusta	Southern terminus of SR 17 concurrency
Franklin	Jay	106.34	171.14	SR 140 south (Intervale Road) – Canton	Northern terminus of SR 140
Franklin	Jay	109.53	176.27	SR 17 north (East Dixfield Road) – East Dixfield, Rumford	Northern terminus of SR 17 concurrency
Franklin	Wilton	112.00	180.25	US 2 west (Tilton Street) – Wilton, Rumford	Southern terminus of US 2 concurrency
Franklin	Wilton	112.85	181.61	SR 156 (Depot Street) – Wilton, Weld	
Franklin	Farmington	116.84	188.04	SR 133 south (Livermore Falls Road) – Livermore Falls	Northern terminus of SR 133
Franklin	Farmington	119.62	192.51	SR 43 west (Bridge Street) – Temple	Southern terminus of SR 43 concurrency
Franklin	Farmington	119.77	192.75	US 2 east / SR 27 south (Farmington Falls Road) – New Sharon, Norridgewock, Skowhegan	Northern terminus of US 2 concurrency; southern terminus of SR 27 concurrency
Franklin	Farmington	120.41	193.78	SR 43 east (Broadway) – Madison	Northern terminus of SR 43 concurrency
Franklin	Farmington	122.86	197.72	SR 27 north (New Vineyard Road) – Kingfield	Northern terminus of SR 27 concurrency
Franklin	Farmington	123.18	198.24	SR 149 north (South Strong Road) – South Strong	Southern terminus of SR 149
Franklin	Strong	131.37	211.42	SR 145 north (South Main Street) – Strong	Southern terminus of SR 145
Franklin	Avon	132.77– 138.39	213.67– 222.72	No major junctions	
Franklin	Phillips	138.91	223.55	SR 142 north to SR 149 – Kingfield, Phillips	Southern terminus of wrong-way concurrency with SR 142
Franklin	Phillips	140.21	225.65	SR 142 south (Weld Road) – Weld, Dixfield	Northern terminus of wrong-way concurrency with SR 142
Franklin	Madrid Township	144.99– 148.44	233.34– 238.89	No major junctions	
Franklin	Township E	148.44– 149.09	238.89– 239.94	No major junctions	
Franklin	Sandy River Plantation	149.09– 157.99	239.94– 254.26	No major junctions	
Franklin	Rangeley Plantation	157.99– 158.51	254.26– 255.10	No major junctions	
Franklin	Rangeley	160.52	258.33	SR 16 east (Pleasant Street) – Stratton, Eustis	Southern terminus of SR 16 concurrency
Franklin	Rangeley	167.01	268.78	SR 16 west (Wilsons Mills Road) – Wilsons Mills	Northern terminus of SR 16 concurrency
Franklin	Rangeley	167.34	269.31	SR 17 east (Rumford Road) – Byron, Roxbury	Western terminus of SR 17
Franklin	Rangeley	168.85	271.74	Haines Landing - Mooselookmeguntic Lake	Dead end; northern terminus
1.000 mi = 1.609 km; 1.000 km = 0.621 mi: Concurrency terminus

== Auxiliary routes ==
State Route 4A (abbreviated SR 4A) is the designation for two separate, but closely located, auxiliary routes of SR 4. Both are former alignments of SR 4 and loop to meet their parent highway at both ends. While not directly connected to one another, they are linked by a 4.15-mile (6.68 km) stretch of US 202 and SR 4 between Hollis and Buxton. The combined length of both segments is 10.49 miles (16.88 km).

=== Southern segment ===
State Route 4A
- Location: Sanford–Alfred
- Length: 6.71 mi (10.80 km)
- Existed: 1947–present

State Route 4A
- Location: Sanford–Alfred
- Length: 4.48 mi (7.21 km)
- Existed: 1941–1947

The southern segment of SR 4A runs for 6.71 miles (10.80 km) between the towns of Sanford and Alfred, and is a service route for downtown Sanford, which SR 4 bypasses to the east.

This segment of SR 4A begins at an intersection with SR 4 and SR 109 south of downtown. SR 4A and SR 109 run concurrently northwest into the center of town, where they intersect with US 202 and SR 11 at Lebanon and Winter Streets. SR 109 continues straight to join SR 11, while SR 4A turns onto Winter Street to join US 202. US 202 and SR 4A run concurrently to the northeast, crossing SR 224 (another bypass of downtown Sanford), then cross into Alfred where they intersect with SR 4 and SR 111. SR 4A ends at this intersection, US 202 turns north to join SR 4 and SR 111 begins to the east.

This segment of SR 4A was part of the original 1931 alignment of SR 4 through Sanford. The northern segment was partially cosigned SR 11 until 1933, and then overlapped by US 202 when it was designated in 1936. The southern segment has always been cosigned with SR 109. An eastern bypass of Sanford was constructed in the late 1930s and finished by 1941, at which time it was given the SR 4A designation. The SR 4 and SR 4A designations were then swapped in 1946-47, with SR 4 assuming the newer bypass alignment and SR 4A assuming the older alignment through downtown Sanford. As a result, the entire length of this segment of SR 4A is overlapped by other routes.

Junction list

The entire route is in York County.

Location	mi	km	Destinations	Notes
Sanford	0.00	0.00	SR 4 / SR 109 south (Alfred Road / Main Street) – North Berwick, Wells, Alfred	Rotary; southern terminus of SR 4A
Sanford	2.80	4.51	US 202 west / SR 11 south (Lebanon Street) – Lebanon, Rochester NH SR 11 / SR 109 north (Main Street) – Springvale, Shapleigh	Northern terminus of SR 109 concurrency; southern terminus of US 202 concurrency
Sanford	4.31	6.94	SR 224 west (Shaws Ridge Road) – Shapleigh, Acton	Eastern terminus of SR 224
Alfred	6.71	10.80	US 202 east / SR 4 (Jordan Springs Road / Waterboro Road) – North Berwick, Waterboro SR 111 east (Biddeford Road) – Lyman, Biddeford	Northern terminus of SR 4A, western terminus of SR 111
1.000 mi = 1.609 km; 1.000 km = 0.621 mi: Concurrency terminus

=== Northern segment ===
State Route 4A
- Location: Hollis–Buxton
- Length: 3.78 mi (6.08 km)
- Existed: 1938–present

The northern segment of SR 4A runs for 4.0 miles (6.4 km) between Hollis and Buxton and is a northern alternate to US 202/SR 4. Like the southern segment, this segment is signed north-south, but is oriented nearly due west to east.

This segment begins at an intersection between US 202 / SR 4 and SR 35 in Hollis. SR 4A and SR 35 share a brief concurrency before SR 4A splits off to the east, crossing SR 117 in the process. The highway continues to the east into the town of Buxton. SR 4A then crosses SR 112 before terminating at US 202/SR 4.

This segment of SR 4A is a former alignment of both US 202 and SR 4, which were moved to a southern bypass alignment in 1937-38.

Junction list

Mileposts on this section of SR 4A continue from the southern segment, omitting the connecting section of US 202/SR 4.

The entire route is in York County.

Location	mi	km	Destinations	Notes
Hollis	6.71	10.80	US 202 / SR 4 (Hollis Road) – East Waterboro SR 35 south (Little Falls Road) – Kennebunk	Southern terminus
Hollis	6.93	11.15	SR 35 north (Main Street) – Hollis	Northern terminus of SR 35 concurrency
Hollis	7.08	11.39	SR 117 (Cape Road) – Saco, Cornish	
Buxton	9.73	15.66	SR 112 (River Road) – Saco, West Buxton	
Buxton	10.49	16.88	US 202 / SR 4 (Narragansett Trail) – Sanford, Gorham	Northern terminus
1.000 mi = 1.609 km; 1.000 km = 0.621 mi: Concurrency terminus
