= West Central Franklin, Maine =

- Unorganized territory
- Location within Maine Location within the United States
- Coordinates: 44°44′48″N 70°37′30″W
- Country: United States
- State: Maine
- County: Franklin

Area
  - Total: 104.7 sq mi (271.2 km^{2})
  - Land: 104.0 sq mi (269.3 km^{2})
  - Water: 0.73 sq mi (1.9 km^{2})
- Elevation: 2,041 ft (622 m)

Population (2020)
  - Total: 1
- Time zone: UTC-5 (Eastern (EST))
  - Summer (DST): UTC-4 (EDT)
- ZIP Code: 04966 (Phillips)
- Area code: 207
- FIPS code: 23-82235
- GNIS feature ID: 582803

West Central Franklin is an unorganized territory located in Franklin County, Maine, United States. As of the 2020 census, the location had a total population of 1. Most of this area has never been organized. The only exception was a short-lived incorporated town in the 19th century (Township 6 was briefly incorporated as the town of Berlin).

== Geography ==
According to the United States Census Bureau, the location has a total area of 104.7 square miles (271.2 km^{2}), of which 104.0 square miles (269.3 km^{2}) is land and 0.7 square mile (1.9 km^{2}) is water. The total area is 0.69% water.

The territory consists of three townships along the western edge of the county, south of Rangeley Plantation and north of Weld, namely Township D, Township E, and Township 6 (North of Weld).

== Demographics ==
Historical population
Census	Pop.	Note	%±
1970	2		—
2010	0		—
2020	1		—
U.S. Decennial Census

As of the 2010 Census, there are no people living in the location.

== Education ==
The Maine Department of Education is responsible for school assignments in unorganized territories.
