= Wilton (CDP), Maine =

Wilton, Maine
- Census-designated place
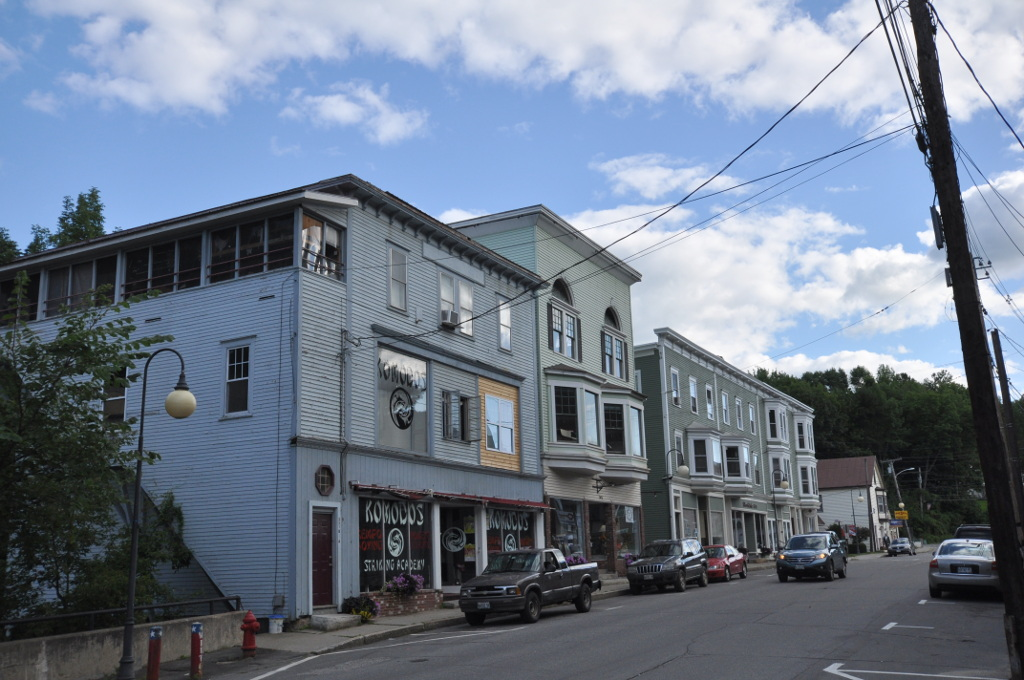
- Downtown Wilton

- Location within the state of Maine
- Coordinates: 44°36′00″N 70°14′37″W
- Country: United States
- State: Maine
- County: Franklin
- Town: Wilton

Area
  - Total: 4.99 sq mi (12.92 km^{2})
  - Land: 4.09 sq mi (10.60 km^{2})
  - Water: 0.90 sq mi (2.33 km^{2})
- Elevation: 607 ft (185 m)

Population (2020)
  - Total: 2,071
  - Density: 506.2/sq mi (195.43/km^{2})
- Time zone: UTC-5 (Eastern (EST))
  - Summer (DST): UTC-4 (EDT)
- ZIP code: 04294
- Area code: 207
- FIPS code: 23-85815
- GNIS feature ID: 2377967

Wilton is a census-designated place (CDP) consisting of the main settlement within the town of Wilton in Franklin County, Maine, United States. The CDP population was 2,198 at the 2010 census, out of a total town population of 4,116.

== Geography ==
The Wilton CDP is located in the south-central part of the town of Wilton. The CDP extends south to the town line and is bordered by the town of Jay to the south. U.S. Route 2 passes through the southern part of the CDP, bypassing the densely settled town center; US 2 leads northeast 8 miles (13 km) to Farmington and west 22 miles (35 km) to Rumford. Maine State Route 4 runs northeast with US 2 to Farmington but branches off at Wilton, leading south 6 miles (10 km) to the center of Jay. Maine State Route 156 passes through the center of Wilton, leading northwest 13 miles (21 km) to Weld and east 10 miles (16 km) to US 2 beyond Farmington, near the town of New Sharon.

According to the United States Census Bureau, the CDP has a total area of 5.0 square miles (12.9 km^{2}), of which 4.1 square miles (10.6 km^{2}) is land and 0.89 square miles (2.3 km^{2}), or 17.99%, is water. Most of the water area is Wilson Pond, which occupies the western side of the CDP. The pond's outlet, Wilson Stream, descends 80 feet (24 m) in elevation through the CDP, which allowed for the development of a few water-powered factories in the 19th century.

== Demographics ==
Historical population
Census	Pop.	Note	%±
2020	2,071		—
U.S. Decennial Census

As of the census of 2000, there were 2,290 people, 958 households, and 614 families residing in the CDP. The population density was 560.9 inhabitants per square mile (216.6/km^{2}). There were 1,078 housing units at an average density of 264.1 per square mile (102.0/km^{2}). The racial makeup of the CDP was 96.77% White, 0.66% Black or African American, 0.61% Native American, 1.00% Asian, and 0.96% from two or more races. Hispanic or Latino of any race were 0.48% of the population.

There were 958 households, out of which 30.8% had children under the age of 18 living with them, 48.0% were married couples living together, 12.8% had a female householder with no husband present, and 35.9% were non-families. 28.9% of all households were made up of individuals, and 12.9% had someone living alone who was 65 years of age or older. The average household size was 2.39 and the average family size was 2.91.

In the CDP, the population was spread out, with 26.4% under the age of 18, 8.3% from 18 to 24, 27.3% from 25 to 44, 24.7% from 45 to 64, and 13.3% who were 65 years of age or older. The median age was 38 years. For every 100 females, there were 88.5 males. For every 100 females age 18 and over, there were 85.7 males.

The median income for a household in the CDP was $31,161, and the median income for a family was $40,000. Males had a median income of $32,383 versus $20,714 for females. The per capita income for the CDP was $17,804. About 7.4% of families and 14.6% of the population were below the poverty line, including 20.7% of those under age 18 and 12.8% of those age 65 or over.
