= Avon, Maine =

Town in Maine, United States

- Town
- Location within the state of Maine
- Coordinates: 44°46′25″N 70°19′25″W
- Country: United States
- State: Maine
- County: Franklin
- Incorporated: 1802

Area
  - Total: 41.65 sq mi (107.87 km^{2})
  - Land: 41.39 sq mi (107.20 km^{2})
  - Water: 0.26 sq mi (0.67 km^{2})
- Elevation: 810 ft (250 m)

Population (2020)
  - Total: 450
  - Density: 11/sq mi (4.2/km^{2})
- Time zone: UTC-5 (Eastern (EST))
  - Summer (DST): UTC-4 (EDT)
- ZIP code: 04966
- Area code: 207
- FIPS code: 23-02235
- GNIS feature ID: 582336

Avon is a town in Franklin County, Maine, United States. The population was 450 at the 2020 census. Avon is home to Mount Blue, part of Mount Blue State Park.

== History ==
First known as Township 2 Abbott's Purchase, or Upper Town, it was settled in 1781 by a pair of sea captains—Joshua Soule, originally from Duxbury, Massachusetts and later Bremen, Maine, with Perkins Allen from Martha's Vineyard. The town was incorporated on February 22, 1802, named for the River Avon in England. One of the Worcestershire villages through which River Avon flows is Eckington, birthplace of Capt. Soule's ancestor, George Soule, a Mayflower Pilgrim. Capt. Soule's son, Bishop Joshua Soule, was raised in Avon.

Fertile soil on either side of the Sandy River yielded grain, fruit and vegetables. When the population was 767 in 1837, the town produced 3,220 bushels of wheat. By 1875, two sawmills operated on a small stream. In the easterly part of town developed the only village, where some trade was conducted. The Sandy River Railroad opened in 1879, transporting freight and tourists between Farmington, Avon, Strong and Phillips. The narrow gauge line became part of the Sandy River and Rangeley Lakes Railroad in 1908, but was discontinued in 1935 during the Great Depression.

== Geography ==
According to the United States Census Bureau, the town has a total area of 41.65 square miles (107.87 km^{2}), of which 41.39 square miles (107.20 km^{2}) is land and 0.26 square miles (0.67 km^{2}) is water. Avon is drained by the Sandy River, a tributary of the Kennebec River. Mount Blue, elevation 3,192 feet (973 meters) above sea level (and part of Mount Blue State Park), is located in the southwestern corner of Avon.

The town is crossed by state routes 4 and 149. It borders the towns of Phillips to the north, Strong to the east, Weld to the west, and Temple to the south.

== Demographics ==
Historical population
| Census | Pop. | Note | %± |
|---|---|---|---|
| 1810 | 304 | | — |
| 1820 | 450 | | 48.0% |
| 1830 | 745 | | 65.6% |
| 1840 | 827 | | 11.0% |
| 1850 | 778 | | −5.9% |
| 1860 | 802 | | 3.1% |
| 1870 | 610 | | −23.9% |
| 1880 | 571 | | −6.4% |
| 1890 | 439 | | −23.1% |
| 1900 | 448 | | 2.1% |
| 1910 | 380 | | −15.2% |
| 1920 | 384 | | 1.1% |
| 1930 | 302 | | −21.4% |
| 1940 | 387 | | 28.1% |
| 1950 | 391 | | 1.0% |
| 1960 | 436 | | 11.5% |
| 1970 | 495 | | 13.5% |
| 1980 | 475 | | −4.0% |
| 1990 | 559 | | 17.7% |
| 2000 | 504 | | −9.8% |
| 2010 | 461 | | −8.5% |
| 2020 | 450 | | −2.4% |
U.S. Decennial Census

=== 2010 census ===
As of the census of 2010, there were 461 people, 216 households, and 126 families residing in the town. The population density was 11.1 inhabitants per square mile (4.3/km^{2}). There were 341 housing units at an average density of 8.2 per square mile (3.2/km^{2}). The racial makeup of the town was 98.0% White, 0.7% African American, 0.2% Asian, 0.7% from other races, and 0.4% from two or more races. Hispanic or Latino of any race were 1.1% of the population.

There were 216 households, of which 25.5% had children under the age of 18 living with them, 40.3% were married couples living together, 12.0% had a female householder with no husband present, 6.0% had a male householder with no wife present, and 41.7% were non-families. 34.3% of all households were made up of individuals, and 17.6% had someone living alone who was 65 years of age or older. The average household size was 2.13 and the average family size was 2.65.

The median age in the town was 46.9 years. 21.3% of residents were under the age of 18; 4.9% were between the ages of 18 and 24; 20.9% were from 25 to 44; 35.8% were from 45 to 64; and 17.1% were 65 years of age or older. The gender makeup of the town was 48.2% male and 51.8% female.

=== 2000 census ===
As of the census of 2000, there were 504 people, 202 households, and 144 families residing in the town. The population density was 12.2 inhabitants per square mile (4.7/km^{2}). There were 302 housing units at an average density of 7.3 per square mile (2.8/km^{2}). The racial makeup of the town was 99.40% White, 0.40% African American, 0.20% from other races. Hispanic or Latino of any race were 0.60% of the population.

There were 202 households, out of which 32.7% had children under the age of 18 living with them, 50.5% were married couples living together, 14.4% had a female householder with no husband present, and 28.7% were non-families. 20.3% of all households were made up of individuals, and 8.9% had someone living alone who was 65 years of age or older. The average household size was 2.50 and the average family size was 2.87.

In the town, the population was spread out, with 26.4% under the age of 18, 6.2% from 18 to 24, 29.4% from 25 to 44, 25.4% from 45 to 64, and 12.7% who were 65 years of age or older. The median age was 39 years. For every 100 females, there were 93.8 males. For every 100 females age 18 and over, there were 94.2 males.

The median income for a household in the town was $29,722, and the median income for a family was $32,250. Males had a median income of $28,125 versus $16,696 for females. The per capita income for the town was $15,573. About 18.4% of families and 20.0% of the population were below the poverty line, including 24.4% of those under age 18 and 25.0% of those age 65 or over.

== Notable people ==
- Joshua Soule, bishop for the Methodist Episcopal Church
- Daniel Robbins Sylvester, Wisconsin State Assemblyman
- Zebulon York, Civil War era general for the Confederate States of America
