= Julia Harris May =

American poet and educator (1833–1912)

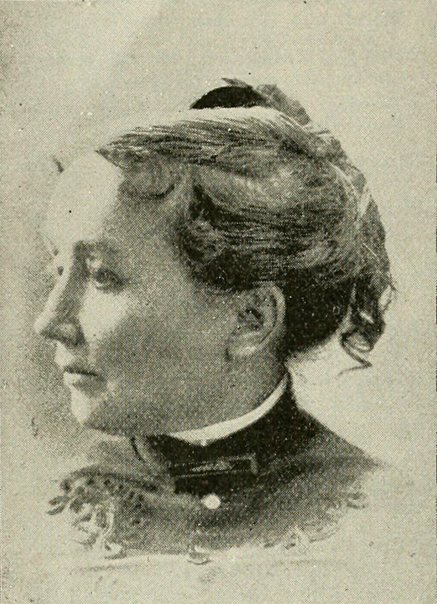
- Born: April 27, 1833; Strong, Maine, U.S.
- Died: May 6, 1912 (aged 89); Auburn, Maine, U.S.
- Education: Mount Holyoke Female Seminary (M.A.)
- Occupations: teacher; school founder; poet

Julia Harris May (April 27, 1833 – May 6, 1912) was an American poet, teacher, and school founder of the long nineteenth century. She spent several years teaching in the south. From 1868, she was the head of a private school in Strong, Maine. Her poems appeared extensively in the leading religious and literary journals of the United States.

== Early life and education ==
Julia Harris May was born in Strong, Maine, April 27, 1833. Her parents were Rev. William and Delia Marie May. When she was four years old, her father died, and soon after, two siblings did as well. This left the mother with two daughters, Sarah and Julia.

At the age of fourteen, May started teaching school. She continued to teach summer schools while continuing her own education in the public schools of Farmington, Maine and the Farmington Academy in the fall and winter for several years. She then entered the Mount Holyoke Female Seminary (now Mount Holyoke College, from which she was graduated with distinction, in 1856, and received the degree of MA in 1906 from that institution.

== Career ==
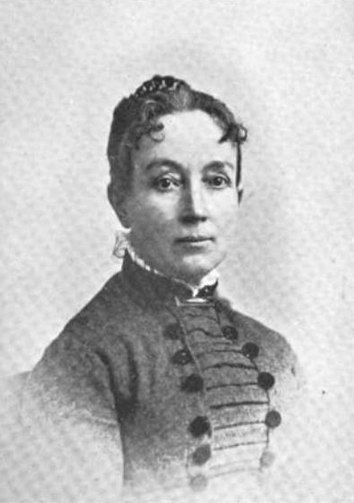
Julia Harris May (1894)

After finishing her studies, she went South and established a private school. Remaining there during the civil war, her mother and sister came to her, and they created a happy home. She loved the South and the people, and prospered among them, but the climate began to affect her health. The family returned to Maine, and after a brief rest and recuperation, the sisters opened the May School at Farmington. It was instantly a success. In 1882, the citizens of Strong, her native town, which adjoined Farmington, induced the sisters to remove their school to Strong, building for them a school house on their own family property.

May was the poet of the household, and her name became familiar to lovers of verse. Sketches, letters, stories, reviews and poems from the two sisters made the winter pass quickly, and each spring, the school opened with renewed prosperity. After their mother died, the two sisters continued working together until December 30, 1888, when Sarah died. (Note: According to the Boston Globe (1912), Sarah died in 1892.)

After the sister's death, May came to Auburn, Maine where she was especially active in club work. For a number of years, she conducted a class in art and literature. She was an honorary member of the Woman's Literary Union and an active member of the Wednesday Morning Club and the Congregational Church. She continued teaching and writing poetry. Some of her most finished and touching poems were written later in life.

She published several volumes of poems, among them, Songs from the Woods of Maine, (1894, New York); Looking for the Stars and Pictures Framed in Song.

== Death ==
May died suddenly at her home in Auburn, Maine, on May 6, 1912, after a brief illness.

== Selected works ==
- Songs from the Woods of Maine, 1894
- Looking for the Stars
- Pictures Framed in Song
