= Daggett Rock =

Glacial erratic in Phillips, Maine

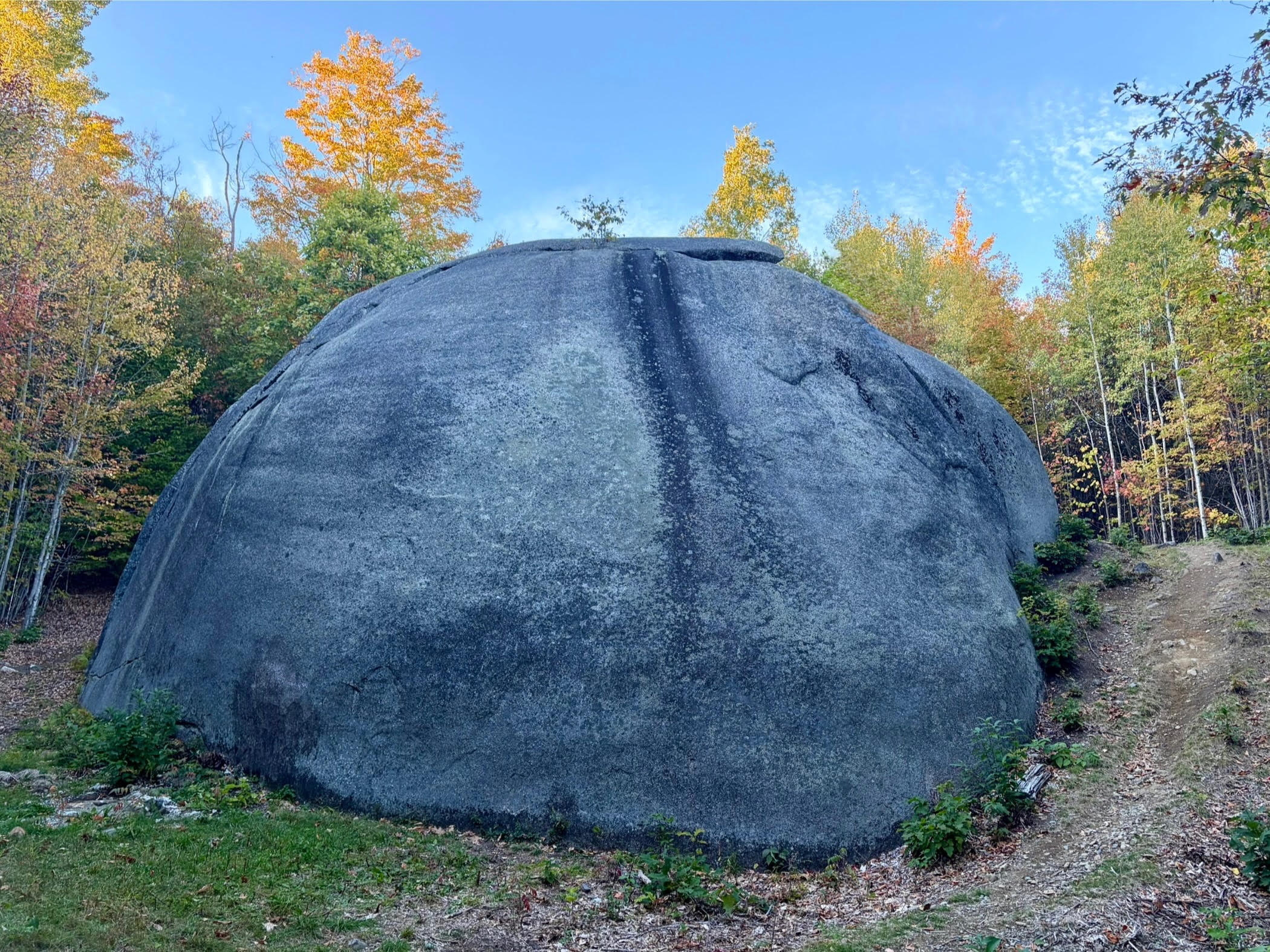
- Daggett Rock in October 2025, viewed from the south

- Location within Maine
- Location: Phillips, Maine, United States
- Coordinates: 44°50′54″N 70°18′18″W
- Administrator: Phillips Historical Society Museum
- Website: Daggett Rock

Daggett Rock (sometimes known as Daggett's rock or Cleft rock) is the largest known glacial erratic in Maine. Located in Phillips, its above-ground portion is about 80 feet (24 m) long, 30 feet (9.1 m) wide, and 25 feet (7.6 m) high, with up to two-thirds of the boulder buried beneath the surface. It is estimated to weigh around 8,000 tons. The rock is split into three pieces with trails running between them.

== Geology ==
Daggett Rock is composed of granite, with some individual feldspar crystals more than 1 inch (2.5 cm) in length. The prevailing opinion amongst geologists is that the boulder originates from the Redington pluton in the Saddleback Mountain area of Rangeley. It was plucked from the ground and transported by glacial ice about 12 miles (19 km) southeast to its current location during the last glacial period, roughly 14,000 years ago.

== History ==
Geologic evidence indicates that Daggett Rock split after it was deposited by the glacier thousands of years ago.

According to popular local legend, in the early 1800s a local woodsman named Daggett came upon the rock while intoxicated during a violent lightning storm and climbed atop it. Upon reaching the top, he cursed God and claimed he could not be struck down, whereupon a great bolt of lightning struck the rock, killing him and splitting the rock into three segments.

Since the 1880s, Daggett Rock has been a popular location amongst wealthy tourists, drawn by the unique nature of the erratic, and it has since become a popular spot for rock climbers.

== Location ==
Daggett Rock is located near Wheeler Hill Road in Phillips, Maine. It is accessible via a 0.33 miles (0.53 km) gradual uphill trail. The property on which the rock sits is owned by the Phillips Historical Society and maintained by the High Peaks Alliance.

== See also ==
- List of individual rocks
