= Macy, Maine =

- Village
- Location within Maine
- Coordinates: 44°55′43″N 70°45′10″W
- Country: United States
- State: Maine
- County: Franklin
- Elevation: 1,542 ft (470 m)
- Time zone: UTC-5 (Eastern (EST))
  - Summer (DST): UTC-4 (EDT)
- ZIP Code: 04964 (Oquosooc)
- Area code: 207
- GNIS feature ID: 579490

Macy is an unincorporated village in Franklin County, Maine, United States.
