= Rumford (CDP), Maine =

Rumford, Maine
- Census-designated place
- Location within Maine Location within the United States
- Coordinates: 44°33′01″N 70°34′05″W
- Country: United States
- State: Maine
- County: Oxford

Area
  - Total: 7.98 sq mi (20.68 km^{2})
  - Land: 7.87 sq mi (20.38 km^{2})
  - Water: 0.12 sq mi (0.30 km^{2})
- Elevation: 627 ft (191 m)

Population (2020)
  - Total: 4,298
  - Density: 546.2/sq mi (210.88/km^{2})
- Time zone: UTC-5 (Eastern (EST))
  - Summer (DST): UTC-4 (EDT)
- ZIP code: 04276
- Area code: 207
- FIPS code: 23-64255
- GNIS feature ID: 2377952

Rumford is a census-designated place (CDP) in the town of Rumford in Oxford County, Maine, United States. The population was 4,795 at the 2000 census.

== Geography ==
According to the United States Census Bureau, the CDP has a total area of 8.0 square miles (20.7 km^{2}), of which 7.9 square miles (20.4 km^{2}) is land and 0.1 square miles (0.3 km^{2}) (1.38%) is water.

== Demographics ==
Historical population
Census	Pop.	Note	%±
2020	4,298		—
U.S. Decennial Census

As of the census of 2000, there were 4,795 people, 2,208 households, and 1,256 families residing in the CDP. The population density was 608.0 inhabitants per square mile (234.8/km^{2}). There were 2,542 housing units at an average density of 322.3 per square mile (124.4/km^{2}). The racial makeup of the CDP was 98.62% White, 0.13% Black or African American, 0.38% Native American, 0.21% Asian, 0.08% from other races, and 0.58% from two or more races. Hispanic or Latino of any race were 0.63% of the population.

There were 2,208 households, out of which 25.2% had children under the age of 18 living with them, 40.9% were married couples living together, 12.1% had a female householder with no husband present, and 43.1% were non-families. 38.0% of all households were made up of individuals, and 18.5% had someone living alone who was 65 years of age or older. The average household size was 2.12 and the average family size was 2.75.

In the CDP, the population was spread out, with 22.6% under the age of 18, 7.7% from 18 to 24, 25.0% from 25 to 44, 20.4% from 45 to 64, and 24.2% who were 65 years of age or older. The median age was 42 years. For every 100 females, there were 89.2 males. For every 100 females age 18 and over, there were 86.9 males.

The median income for a household in the CDP was $24,938, and the median income for a family was $30,024. Males had a median income of $37,617 versus $20,734 for females. The per capita income for the CDP was $15,199. About 15.1% of families and 19.6% of the population were below the poverty line, including 28.1% of those under age 18 and 12.1% of those age 65 or over.
