= Rangeley (CDP), Maine =

Rangeley, Maine
- Census-designated place
- Location within Maine Location within the United States
- Coordinates: 44°57′51″N 70°38′48″W
- Country: United States
- State: Maine
- County: Franklin
- Town: Rangeley

Area
  - Total: 3.13 sq mi (8.11 km^{2})
  - Land: 2.60 sq mi (6.73 km^{2})
  - Water: 0.54 sq mi (1.39 km^{2})
- Elevation: 1,516 ft (462 m)

Population (2020)
  - Total: 590
  - Density: 227.1/sq mi (87.67/km^{2})
- Time zone: UTC-5 (Eastern (EST))
  - Summer (DST): UTC-4 (EDT)
- ZIP Code: 04970
- Area code: 207
- FIPS code: 23-61805
- GNIS feature ID: 2806279

Rangeley is a census-designated place (CDP) and the primary village in the town of Rangeley, Franklin County, Maine, United States. It is in the southeast corner of the town, at the northeast end of Rangeley Lake. Maine State Route 4 runs through the village, leading southeast 40 miles (64 km) to Farmington and west 7 miles (11 km) to Oquossoc village in the western part of the town of Rangeley. State Route 16 joins Route 4 in Rangeley village, running west with it to Oquossoc but leading northeast 19 miles (31 km) to Stratton.

Rangeley was first listed as a CDP prior to the 2020 census.

== Demographics ==
Historical population
Census	Pop.	Note	%±
2020	590		—
U.S. Decennial Census
