= East Dixfield, Maine =

- Village
- Location within Maine
- Coordinates: 44°34′24″N 70°18′13″W
- Country: United States
- State: Maine
- County: Franklin, Oxford
- Elevation: 482 ft (147 m)
- Time zone: UTC-5 (Eastern (EST))
  - Summer (DST): UTC-4 (EDT)
- ZIP code: 04227
- Area code: 207
- GNIS feature ID: 565599

East Dixfield is an unincorporated village in the towns of Wilton in Franklin County and Dixfield in Oxford County, in the U.S. state of Maine. The community is located along U.S. Route 2 and Maine State Route 17, 10 miles (16 km) southwest of Farmington. East Dixfield has a post office with ZIP code 04227.
