= J. Blaine Morrison =

American politician and lawyer

J. Blaine Morrison (August 10, 1884 – March 22, 1943) was an American politician and lawyer from Maine. A Republican from Phillips, Maine, Morrisonon served in the Maine Legislature from his election in 1922 until 1930. From 1922 to 1924, Morrison served in the Maine House of Representatives. Elected to the Maine Senate in 1924, Morrison served until 1930. During his final term (1929–1930), he was elected Senate President.

Morrison died in March 1943. The Maine Senate, which was then debating a proposed limitation on uses of gas tax revenues, adjourned in recognition of Morrison's funeral.
