= Amos Morrison =

American politician (1908–1989)

Member of the Nebraska Legislature from the 42nd district
- In office January 4, 1955 – January 1, 1957
- Preceded by: Terry Carpenter
- Succeeded by: Terry Carpenter

Personal details
- Born: January 7, 1908 Gering, Nebraska
- Died: March 13, 1989 (aged 81) Gering, Nebraska
- Party: Republican
- Spouse: Marjorie Maxine Maxwell (m. 1931)
- Children: 2
- Education: Nebraska Wesleyan University (B.A.)
- Occupation: Farmer

Amos "Mike" Morrison (January 7, 1908 – March 13, 1989) was a Republican politician from Nebraska who served as a member of the Nebraska Legislature from the 42nd district from 1955 to 1957.

== Early life ==
Morrison was born in Gering, Nebraska, in 1908, and grew up in Scottsbluff, graduating from Scottsbluff High School. He graduated from Nebraska Wesleyan University with his bachelor's degree in 1929, and briefly moved to Grand Lake, Colorado, where he was a co-owner of the Grand Lake Light Company. He returned to Nebraska in 1942, and maintained a farm in Mitchell.

== Nebraska Legislature ==
In 1950, Morrison ran for the state legislature from the 42nd district, which was based in Scotts Bluff County, challenging incumbent State Senator Otto Prohs for re-election. In the primary election, Morrison narrowly placed third, receiving 31 percent of the vote to Prohs's 33 percent and farmer Carl Thomas's 36 percent.

Morrison challenged Prohs again in 1952, and was joined in the primary election by former Congressman Terry Carpenter. Carpenter placed first in the primary election by a wide margin, receiving 48 percent of the vote to Morrison's 27 percent and Prohs's 25 percent. Carpenter and Morrison advanced to the general election, where Carpenter defeated Morrison, 54–46 percent.

Carpenter opted to run for the U.S. Senate in 1954 rather than seek re-election, and Morrison ran to succeed him. In the primary election, Morrison faced Scottsbluff Mayor Clark Williams and farmer H. V. Anderson. Morrison placed first, winning 39 percent of the vote to Williams's 32 percent and Anderson's 29 percent. He advanced to the general election with Williams, and defeated him with 56 percent of the vote.

Morrison ran for re-election in 1956, and was challenged for re-election by Carpenter. Carpenter narrowly placed first in the primary election, receiving 53 percent of the vote to Morrison's 47 percent. He defeated Morrison by a wide margin in the general election, winning 59–41 percent.

== Post-legislative career ==
Morrison was elected as a delegate to the 1960 Republican National Convention from the 4th congressional district.

== Death ==
Morrison died on March 13, 1989.
