= Industry, Maine =

- New England town
- Location within Maine Location within the United States
- Coordinates: 44°44′33″N 70°03′02″W
- Country: United States
- State: Maine
- County: Franklin
- Villages: Allens Mills; West Mills

Area
  - Total: 30.98 sq mi (80.24 km^{2})
  - Land: 29.75 sq mi (77.05 km^{2})
  - Water: 1.23 sq mi (3.19 km^{2})
- Elevation: 768 ft (234 m)

Population (2020)
  - Total: 788
  - Density: 26/sq mi (10.2/km^{2})
- Time zone: UTC-5 (Eastern (EST))
  - Summer (DST): UTC-4 (EDT)
- ZIP code: 04938
- Area code: 207
- FIPS code: 23-34820
- GNIS feature ID: 582528
- Website: www.townofindustry.com

Industry is a town in Franklin County, Maine, United States. The population was 788 at the 2020 census. It was named from the industrious habits of its citizens.

== Geography ==
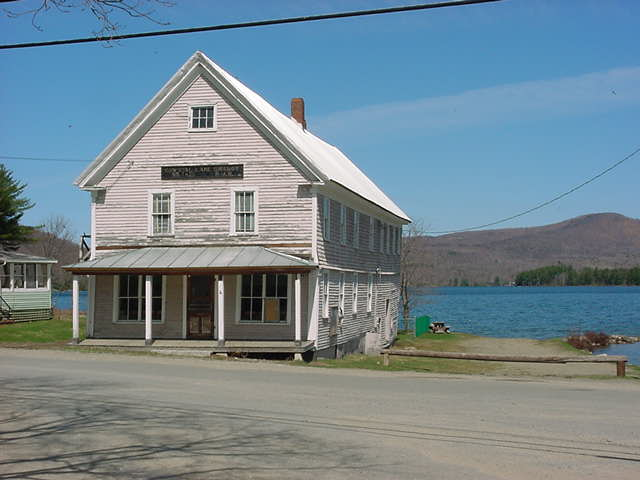
The former Crystal Lake Grange at Clearwater lake, which was torn down - photo taken April 20, 2002

According to the United States Census Bureau, the town has a total area of 30.98 square miles (80.24 km^{2}), of which 29.75 square miles (77.05 km^{2}) is land and 1.23 square miles (3.19 km^{2}) is water.

== Demographics ==
Historical population
Census	Pop.	Note	%±
1810	562		—
1820	796		41.6%
1830	902		13.3%
1840	1,036		14.9%
1850	1,041		0.5%
1860	827		−20.6%
1870	725		−12.3%
1880	715		−1.4%
1890	545		−23.8%
1900	553		1.5%
1910	465		−15.9%
1920	431		−7.3%
1930	342		−20.6%
1940	307		−10.2%
1950	315		2.6%
1960	262		−16.8%
1970	347		32.4%
1980	563		62.2%
1990	685		21.7%
2000	790		15.3%
2010	929		17.6%
2020	788		−15.2%
U.S. Decennial Census

=== 2010 census ===
As of the census of 2010, there were 929 people, 376 households, and 264 families living in the town. The population density was 31.2 inhabitants per square mile (12.0/km^{2}). There were 625 housing units at an average density of 21.0 per square mile (8.1/km^{2}). The racial makeup of the town was 97.2% White, 0.1% African American, 0.2% Native American, 0.1% Asian, and 2.4% from two or more races. Hispanic or Latino of any race were 0.4% of the population.

There were 376 households, of which 31.9% had children under the age of 18 living with them, 57.2% were married couples living together, 9.6% had a female householder with no husband present, 3.5% had a male householder with no wife present, and 29.8% were non-families. 23.9% of all households were made up of individuals, and 8.6% had someone living alone who was 65 years of age or older. The average household size was 2.47 and the average family size was 2.93.

The median age in the town was 44.1 years. 24.3% of residents were under the age of 18; 5.4% were between the ages of 18 and 24; 21.8% were from 25 to 44; 33.3% were from 45 to 64; and 15.5% were 65 years of age or older. The gender makeup of the town was 49.5% male and 50.5% female.

=== 2000 census ===
As of the census of 2000, there were 790 people, 306 households, and 219 families living in the town. The population density was 26.4 inhabitants per square mile (10.2/km^{2}). There were 487 housing units at an average density of 16.2 per square mile (6.3/km^{2}). The racial makeup of the town was 98.35% White, 0.63% African American, and 1.01% from two or more races. Hispanic or Latino of any race were 0.51% of the population.

There were 306 households, out of which 28.8% had children under the age of 18 living with them, 62.7% were married couples living together, 4.2% had a female householder with no husband present, and 28.4% were non-families. 20.6% of all households were made up of individuals, and 8.2% had someone living alone who was 65 years of age or older. The average household size was 2.58 and the average family size was 2.97.

In the town, the population was spread out, with 25.9% under the age of 18, 6.3% from 18 to 24, 30.1% from 25 to 44, 24.6% from 45 to 64, and 13.0% who were 65 years of age or older. The median age was 39 years. For every 100 females, there were 101.0 males. For every 100 females age 18 and over, there were 101.7 males.

The median income for a household in the town was $32,292, and the median income for a family was $36,875. Males had a median income of $29,375 versus $18,875 for females. The per capita income for the town was $14,403. About 13.1% of families and 18.1% of the population were below the poverty line, including 20.6% of those under age 18 and 18.0% of those age 65 or over.

== Notable person ==
- Will Bonsall, author, seed saver and veganic farmer
