= Norridgewock (CDP), Maine =

Norridgewock, Maine
- Census-designated place
- Location within Maine Location within the United States
- Coordinates: 44°43′51″N 69°45′24″W
- Country: United States
- State: Maine
- County: Somerset

Area
  - Total: 11.53 sq mi (29.87 km^{2})
  - Land: 11.07 sq mi (28.68 km^{2})
  - Water: 0.46 sq mi (1.19 km^{2})
- Elevation: 249 ft (76 m)

Population (2020)
  - Total: 1,351
  - Density: 122.0/sq mi (47.11/km^{2})
- Time zone: UTC-5 (Eastern (EST))
  - Summer (DST): UTC-4 (EDT)
- ZIP code: 04957
- Area code: 207
- FIPS code: 23-49800
- GNIS feature ID: 2377941

Norridgewock is a census-designated place (CDP) in the town of Norridgewock in Somerset County, Maine, United States. The population was 1,351 at the 2020 census.

== Geography ==
According to the United States Census Bureau, the CDP has a total area of 11.2 square miles (29.0 km^{2}), of which 10.7 square miles (27.8 km^{2}) is land and 0.5 square mile (1.2 km^{2}) (4.20%) is water.

== Demographics ==
Historical population
Census	Pop.	Note	%±
2020	1,351		—
U.S. Decennial Census

As of the census of 2000, there were 1,557 people, 602 households, and 455 families residing in the CDP. The population density was 145.1 inhabitants per square mile (56.0/km^{2}). There were 647 housing units at an average density of 60.3 per square mile (23.3/km^{2}). The racial makeup of the CDP was 97.82% White, 0.19% Black or African American, 0.71% Native American, 0.13% Asian, 0.39% from other races, and 0.77% from two or more races. Hispanic or Latino of any race were 0.32% of the population.

There were 602 households, out of which 37.2% had children under the age of 18 living with them, 58.6% were married couples living together, 11.0% had a female householder with no husband present, and 24.4% were non-families. 17.4% of all households were made up of individuals, and 6.6% had someone living alone who was 65 years of age or older. The average household size was 2.59 and the average family size was 2.90.

In the CDP, the population was spread out, with 27.0% under the age of 18, 7.2% from 18 to 24, 28.6% from 25 to 44, 25.2% from 45 to 64, and 11.9% who were 65 years of age or older. The median age was 37 years. For every 100 females, there were 97.6 males. For every 100 females age 18 and over, there were 92.5 males.

The median income for a household in the CDP was $31,458, and the median income for a family was $36,161. Males had a median income of $30,976 versus $19,957 for females. The per capita income for the CDP was $16,577. About 18.9% of families and 21.6% of the population were below the poverty line, including 33.8% of those under age 18 and 14.1% of those age 65 or over.
