= Kingfield (CDP), Maine =

Kingfield, Maine
- Census-designated place
- Location within Maine Location within the United States
- Coordinates: 44°57′29″N 70°09′33″W
- Country: United States
- State: Maine
- County: Franklin
- Town: Kingfield

Area
  - Total: 3.64 sq mi (9.44 km^{2})
  - Land: 3.64 sq mi (9.42 km^{2})
  - Water: 0.0077 sq mi (0.02 km^{2})
- Elevation: 587 ft (179 m)

Population (2020)
  - Total: 640
  - Density: 175.9/sq mi (67.93/km^{2})
- Time zone: UTC-5 (Eastern (EST))
  - Summer (DST): UTC-4 (EDT)
- ZIP Code: 04947
- Area code: 207
- FIPS code: 23-36990
- GNIS feature ID: 2806278

Kingfield is a census-designated place (CDP) and the primary village in the town of Kingfield, Franklin County, Maine, United States. It is in the southeastern part of the town, along the Carrabassett River where it is joined by its West Branch. It is bordered partly to the south by the town of New Portland in Somerset County.

State Routes 16 and 27 join in the village, together leading north 12 miles (19 km) to Carrabassett Valley. Route 16 leads southeast from Kingfield 16 miles (26 km) to North Anson, while Route 27 leads south 22 miles (35 km) to Farmington. Route 142 leads southwest out of Kingfield 15 miles (24 km) to Phillips.

Kingfield was first listed as a CDP prior to the 2020 census.

== Demographics ==
Historical population
Census	Pop.	Note	%±
2020	640		—
U.S. Decennial Census
