= Phillips, Maine =

Town in Maine, United States

- Town
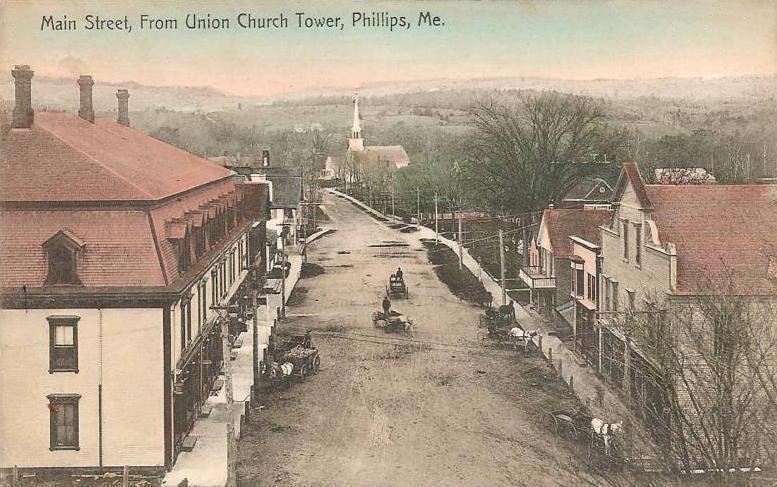
- Main Street in 1907

- Seal

- Location within the state of Maine
- Coordinates: 44°52′20″N 70°21′24″W
- Country: United States
- State: Maine
- County: Franklin
- Incorporated: 1812

Area
  - Total: 50.99 sq mi (132.06 km^{2})
  - Land: 50.81 sq mi (131.60 km^{2})
  - Water: 0.18 sq mi (0.47 km^{2})
- Elevation: 1,024 ft (312 m)

Population (2020)
  - Total: 898
  - Density: 18/sq mi (6.8/km^{2})
- Time zone: UTC-5 (Eastern (EST))
  - Summer (DST): UTC-4 (EDT)
- ZIP code: 04966
- Area code: 207
- FIPS code: 23-58445
- GNIS feature ID: 582674
- Website: phillipsmaine.com

Phillips is a town in Franklin County, Maine, United States. The population was 898 at the 2020 census. It is home to the Sandy River and Rangeley Lakes Railroad, a heritage railroad.

== History ==
The plantation was part of a large tract granted by Massachusetts about 1790 to Jonathan Phillips of Boston. It was first settled in 1791 by Perkins Allen from Martha's Vineyard, a sea captain who called it Curvo. It was incorporated on February 25, 1812, and named for Phillips. The town was noted both for its productive soil, with hay the chief crop, and its superior water power. At falls along the Sandy River were erected sawmills, gristmills, a fulling mill and a carding machine.

Other industries included a starch factory, tannery, furniture factory, boot and shoe factory, carriage maker, and harness maker. Most significantly, however, Phillips became prosperous as the center for lumbering in the Rangeley Lake region. At first, lumber was shipped during winter months on sledges dragged across the snow by oxen. But then in 1879, the narrow-gauge Sandy River Railroad opened to Farmington, where the Maine Central Railroad carried freight to further destinations. In 1891, the line became the Sandy River and Rangeley Lakes Railroad. Although the railroad closed in 1935, a short section has been revived as a tourist attraction and museum.

== Geography ==
According to the United States Census Bureau, the town has a total area of 50.99 square miles (132.06 km^{2}), of which 50.81 square miles (131.60 km^{2}) is land and 0.18 square miles (0.47 km^{2}) is water. Phillips is drained by the Sandy River, a tributary of the Kennebec River.

The town is bordered by Madrid and Salem Townships to the north, Township 6 North of Weld to the west, Weld and Avon to the south, and Freeman Township to the east.

Phillips is crossed by state routes 4, 142 and 149.

=== Climate ===
This climatic region has large seasonal temperature differences, with warm to hot (and often humid) summers and cold (sometimes severely cold) winters. According to the Köppen Climate Classification system, Phillips has a humid continental climate, abbreviated "Dfb" on climate maps, as with nearby Rangeley.

=== Toothaker Pond ===
Toothaker Pond
- Location within Maine
- Coordinates: 44°52′N 70°24′W
- Primary outflows: Sandy River
- Max. length: 500 yd (460 m)
- Surface area: 23 acres (9.3 ha)
- Max. depth: 20 feet (6.1 m)
- Water volume: 134 acre⋅ft (165,000 m^{3})
- Surface elevation: 794 ft (242 m)

The Sandy River and Rangeley Lakes Railroad followed the west shore of Toothaker pond in the northern part of Phillips. The pond overflows into the Sandy River 1 mile (1.6 km) to the south. Berlin Mills Co. built a sawmill in 1902 using Toothaker Pond as a log pond. The pond shoreline was developed with residences and seasonal cabins after the sawmill closed in 1908. The pond has summer algal blooms and dissolved oxygen deficiencies. It holds Brook Trout, rainbow smelt, golden shiner, Yellow Perch and redbelly dace.

== Demographics ==
Historical population
Census	Pop.	Note	%±
1820	634		—
1830	954		50.5%
1840	1,312		37.5%
1850	1,673		27.5%
1860	1,698		1.5%
1870	1,373		−19.1%
1880	1,437		4.7%
1890	1,394		−3.0%
1900	1,399		0.4%
1910	1,423		1.7%
1920	1,353		−4.9%
1930	1,143		−15.5%
1940	1,186		3.8%
1950	1,088		−8.3%
1960	1,021		−6.2%
1970	979		−4.1%
1980	1,092		11.5%
1990	1,148		5.1%
2000	990		−13.8%
2010	1,028		3.8%
2020	898		−12.6%
U.S. Decennial Census

=== 2010 census ===
As of the census of 2010, there were 1,028 people, 454 households, and 284 families living in the town. The population density was 20.2 inhabitants per square mile (7.8/km^{2}). There were 668 housing units at an average density of 13.1 per square mile (5.1/km^{2}). The racial makeup of the town was 97.7% White, 0.2% African American, 0.3% Asian, and 1.8% from two or more races. Hispanic or Latino of any race were 1.1% of the population.

There were 454 households, of which 26.4% had children under the age of 18 living with them, 47.8% were married couples living together, 8.8% had a female householder with no husband present, 5.9% had a male householder with no wife present, and 37.4% were non-families. 30.6% of all households were made up of individuals, and 11.9% had someone living alone who was 65 years of age or older. The average household size was 2.26 and the average family size was 2.76.

The median age in the town was 45.5 years. 21.7% of residents were under the age of 18; 4.8% were between the ages of 18 and 24; 22.9% were from 25 to 44; 34.6% were from 45 to 64; and 16.1% were 65 years of age or older. The gender makeup of the town was 48.6% male and 51.4% female.

=== 2000 census ===
As of the census of 2000, there were 990 people, 407 households, and 275 families living in the town. The population density was 19.4 people per square mile (7.5 people/km^{2}). There were 626 housing units at an average density of 12.3 per square mile (4.7/km^{2}). The racial makeup of the town was 98.79% White, 0.10% African American, 0.51% Native American, 0.10% Asian, and 0.51% from two or more races. Hispanic or Latino of any race were 0.40% of the population.

There were 407 households, out of which 29.0% had children under the age of 18 living with them, 54.8% were married couples living together, 9.1% had a female householder with no husband present, and 32.2% were non-families. 25.8% of all households were made up of individuals, and 11.8% had someone living alone who was 65 years of age or older. The average household size was 2.43 and the average family size was 2.83.

In the town, the population was spread out, with 23.8% under the age of 18, 5.9% from 18 to 24, 28.3% from 25 to 44, 28.8% from 45 to 64, and 13.2% who were 65 years of age or older. The median age was 40 years. For every 100 females, there were 97.2 males. For every 100 females age 18 and over, there were 94.3 males.

The median income for a household in the town was $30,579, and the median income for a family was $32,284. Males had a median income of $26,413 versus $19,250 for females. The per capita income for the town was $13,840. About 9.3% of families and 16.7% of the population were below the poverty line, including 20.6% of those under age 18 and 20.5% of those age 65 or over.

== Schools ==
Phillips is part of Maine School Administrative District 58, and home to Phillips Elementary School.

== Stereoscopic views ==
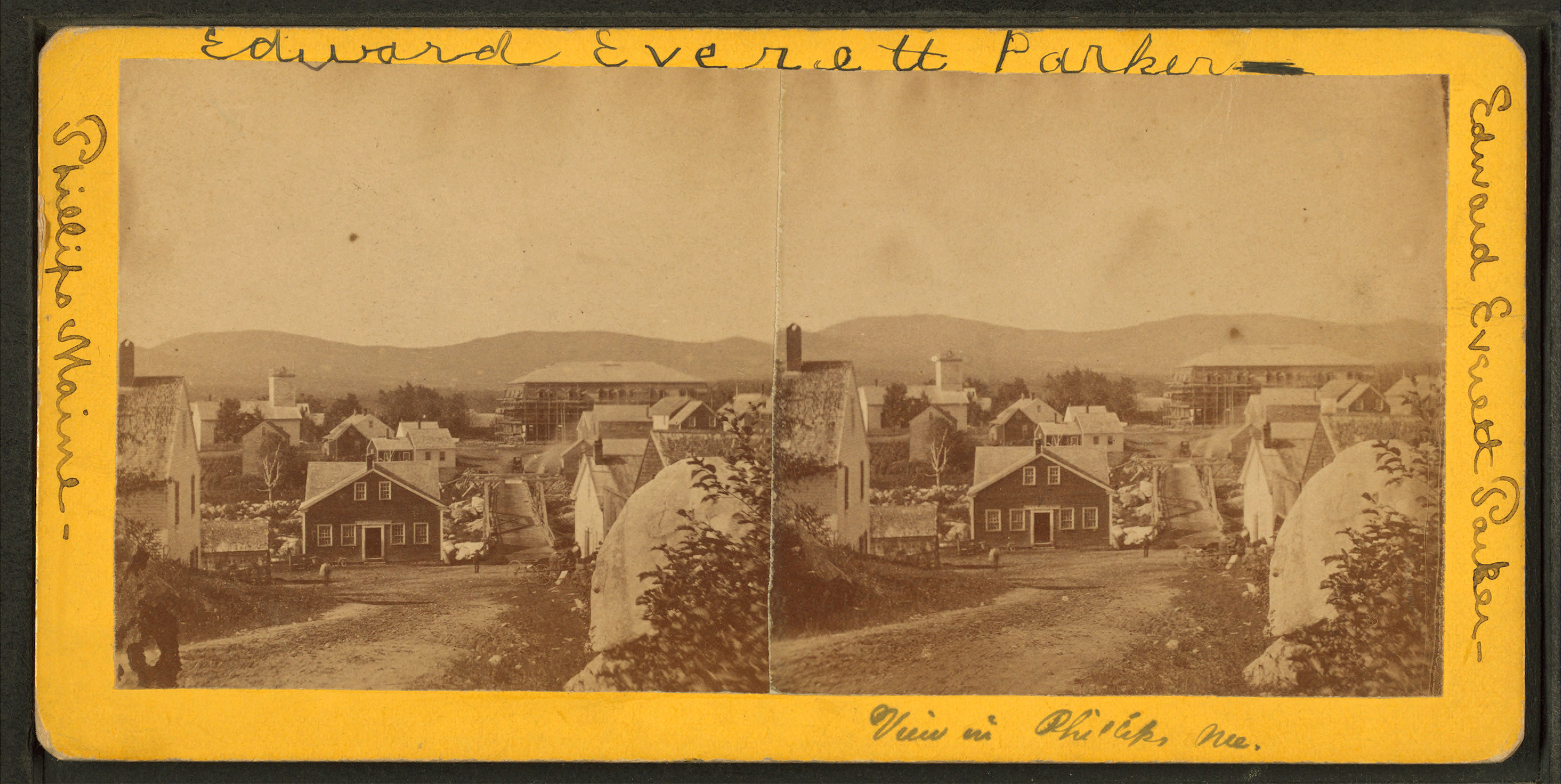
General view c. 1872–1873

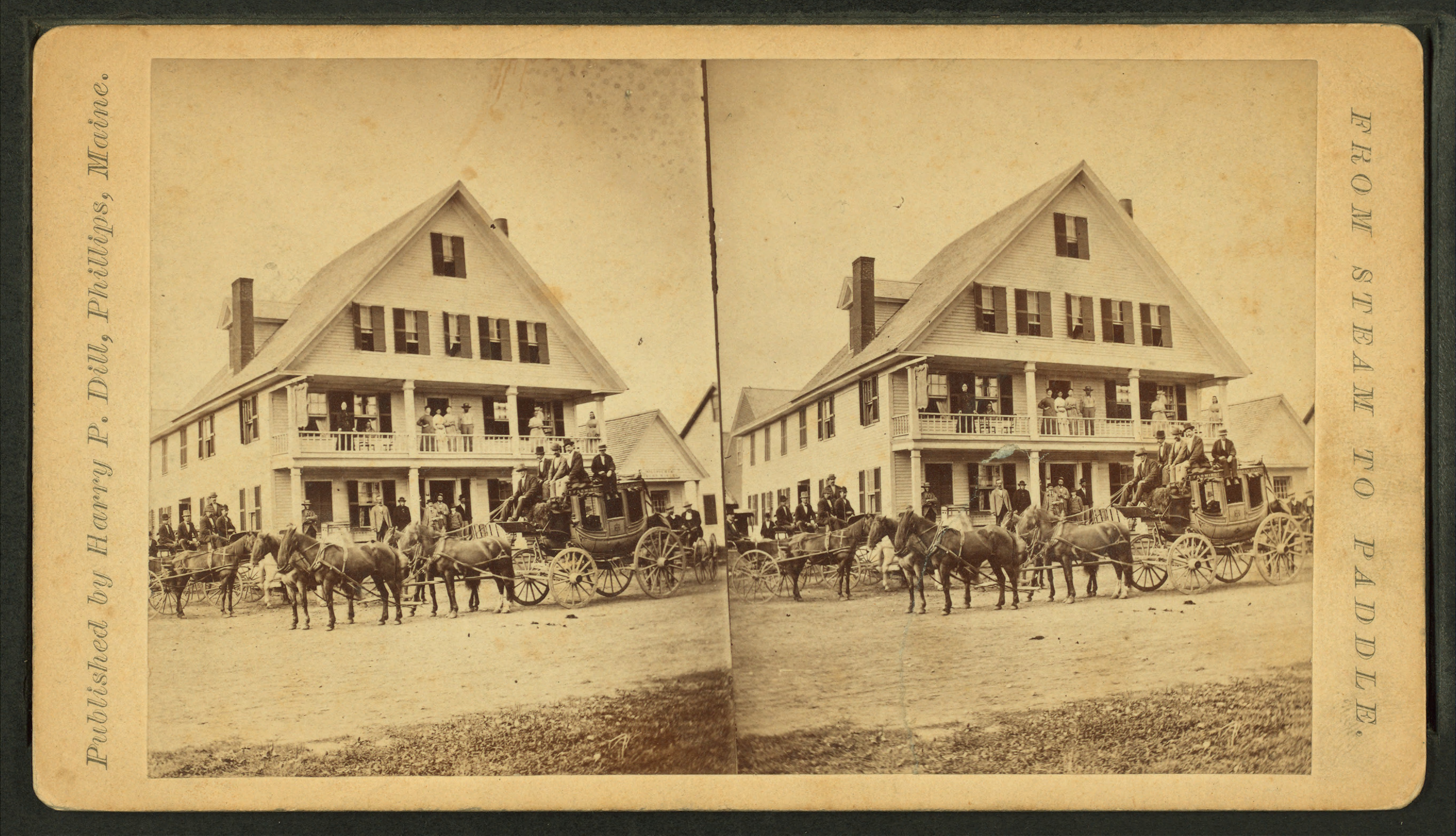
Barden House

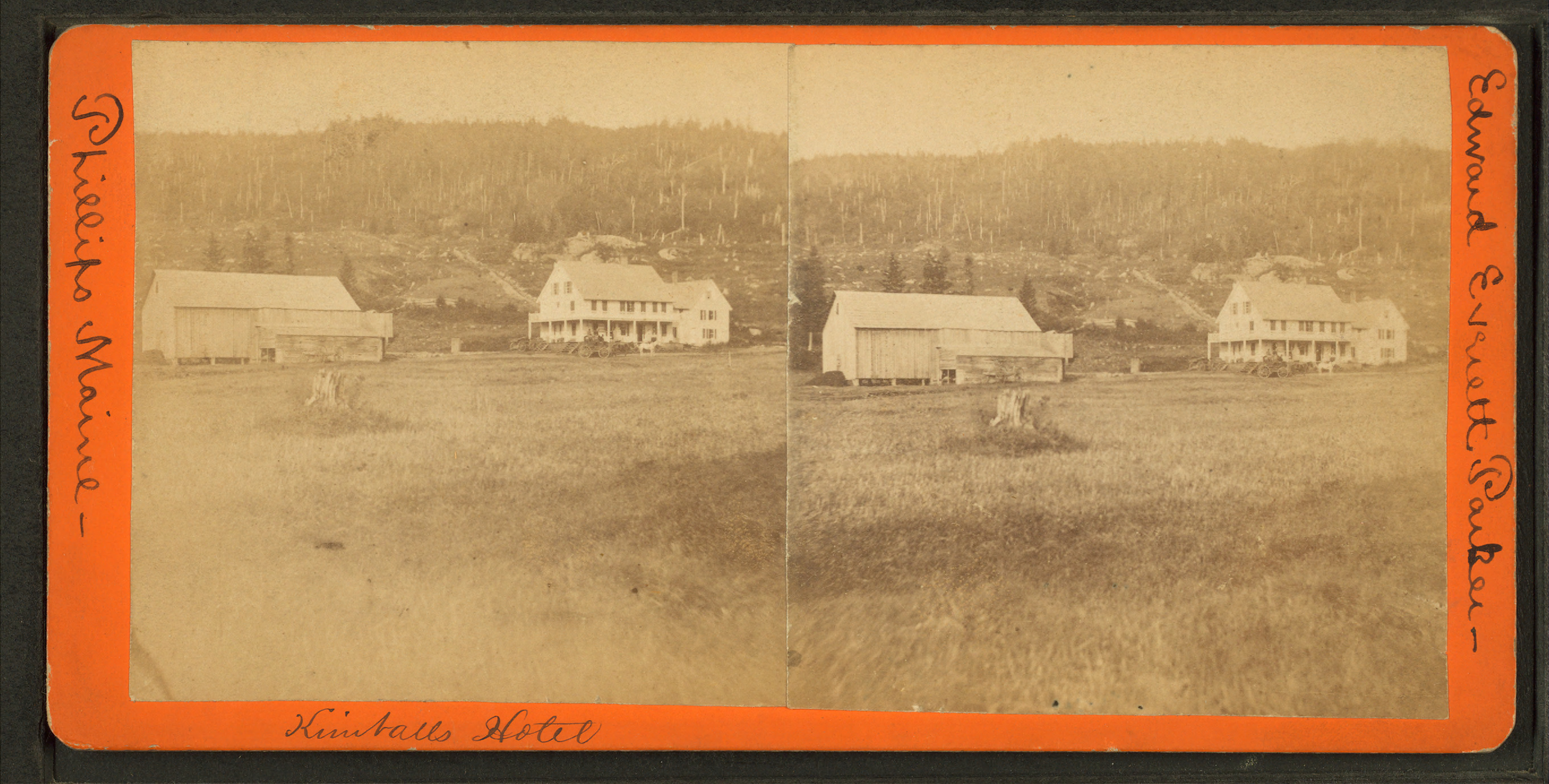
Kimball's Hotel

== Sites of interest ==
- Daggett Rock Maine's Largest Glacial Erratic
- Phillips Historical Society
- Sandy River and Rangeley Lakes Railroad – museum and heritage railroad

== Notable people ==
- Horace A. Barrows, 19th century physician, maker of plant-based medicines and advocate of vegetarian diet
- Carroll L. Beedy, US congressman
- Nathan Cook Brackett, abolitionist, founder of Storer College and Bluefield State College
- Minnie D. Craig, legislator
- J. Blaine Morrison, Maine legislator and lawyer
- Andrew Bonney Robbins, entrepreneur, civil war veteran, real estate developer
- John P. Soule, photographer, publisher
- C. J. Stevens, writer
- Augustus Stinchfield, physician
