= Franklin County, Maine =

County in Maine, United States

- County
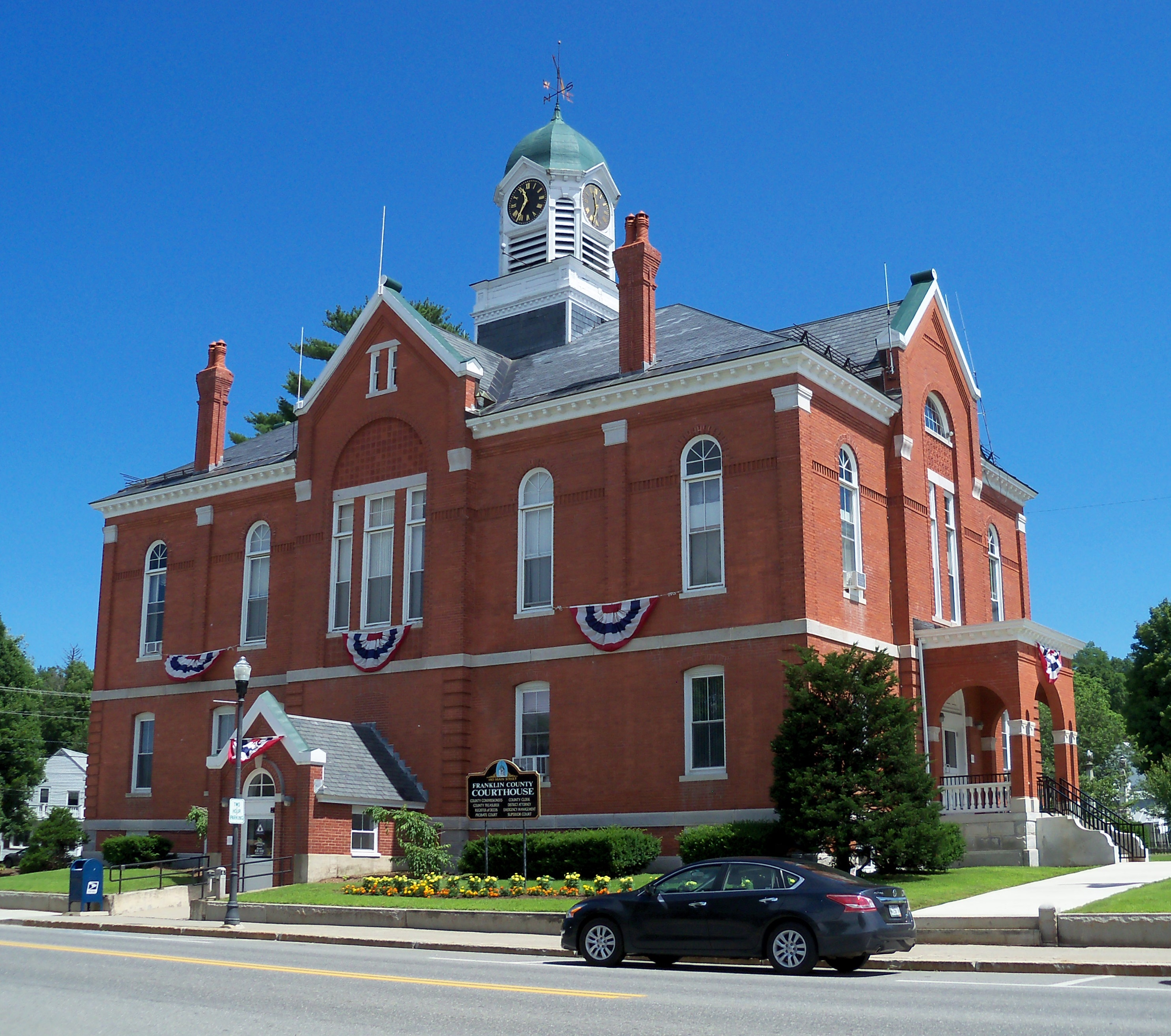
- Franklin County Courthouse

- Seal

- Location within the U.S. state of Maine
- Coordinates: 44°52′45″N 70°23′17″W
- Country: United States
- State: Maine
- Founded: May 9, 1838
- Named for: Benjamin Franklin
- Seat: Farmington
- Largest town: Farmington

Area
  - Total: 1,743 sq mi (4,510 km^{2})
  - Land: 1,697 sq mi (4,400 km^{2})
  - Water: 47 sq mi (120 km^{2}) 2.7%

Population (2020)
  - Total: 29,456
  - Estimate (2025): 30,824 ▲
  - Density: 17.36/sq mi (6.702/km^{2})
- Time zone: UTC−5 (Eastern)
  - Summer (DST): UTC−4 (EDT)
- Congressional district: 2nd
- Website: franklincountymaine.gov

Franklin County is a county located in the state of Maine, United States. As of the 2020 census, the population was 29,456, making it the second-least populous county in Maine. Its county seat is Farmington. The county was established on May 9, 1838, and named for Benjamin Franklin.

== History ==
Franklin County was formed on May 9, 1838, from portions of Kennebec, Oxford and Somerset counties. Smaller adjustments were made during the following fourteen years.

== Geography ==
According to the U.S. Census Bureau, the county has a total area of 1,743 square miles (4,510 km^{2}), of which 1,697 square miles (4,400 km^{2}) is land and 47 square miles (120 km^{2}) (2.7%) is water. The county is crossed by some of the northernmost parts of the Appalachian Mountain range, with the terrain also including several lakes and ponds, including Rangely Lake, the Chain of Ponds and part of Mooselookmegantic Lake. The county high point is Sugarloaf Mountain, the ski mountain in Carrabassett Valley whose elevation is 4,237 feet (1,291 m).

=== Adjacent counties and municipalities ===
- Somerset County – northeast
- Kennebec County – southeast
- Androscoggin County – south
- Oxford County – southwest
- Le Granit Regional County Municipality, Quebec – northwest

=== Major highways ===
- US 2
- SR 4
- SR 16
- SR 17
- SR 27
- SR 133
- SR 142
- SR 156

== Demographics ==
Historical population
Census	Pop.	Note	%±
1840	20,801		—
1850	20,027		−3.7%
1860	20,403		1.9%
1870	18,807		−7.8%
1880	18,180		−3.3%
1890	17,053		−6.2%
1900	18,444		8.2%
1910	19,119		3.7%
1920	19,825		3.7%
1930	19,941		0.6%
1940	19,896		−0.2%
1950	20,682		4.0%
1960	20,069		−3.0%
1970	22,444		11.8%
1980	27,098		20.7%
1990	29,008		7.0%
2000	29,467		1.6%
2010	30,768		4.4%
2020	29,456		−4.3%
2025 (est.)	30,824	▲	4.6%
U.S. Decennial Census; 1790–1960 1900–1990; 1990–2000 2010–2016

=== 2020 census ===
As of the 2020 census, the county had a population of 29,456. Of the residents, 18.4% were under the age of 18 and 23.6% were 65 years of age or older; the median age was 46.9 years. For every 100 females there were 98.1 males, and for every 100 females age 18 and over there were 96.7 males. 0.0% of residents lived in urban areas and 100.0% lived in rural areas.

The racial makeup of the county was 92.9% White, 0.6% Black or African American, 0.2% American Indian and Alaska Native, 1.3% Asian, 0.1% Native Hawaiian and Pacific Islander, 0.6% from some other race, and 4.3% from two or more races. Hispanic or Latino residents of any race comprised 1.4% of the population.

There were 12,842 households in the county, of which 22.6% had children under the age of 18 living with them and 24.6% had a female householder with no spouse or partner present. About 32.0% of all households were made up of individuals and 15.4% had someone living alone who was 65 years of age or older.

There were 20,856 housing units, of which 38.4% were vacant. Among occupied housing units, 74.9% were owner-occupied and 25.1% were renter-occupied. The homeowner vacancy rate was 2.2% and the rental vacancy rate was 9.8%.

Franklin County, Maine – Racial and ethnic composition Note: the US Census treats Hispanic/Latino as an ethnic category. This table excludes Latinos from the racial categories and assigns them to a separate category. Hispanics/Latinos may be of any race.
Race / Ethnicity (NH = Non-Hispanic)	Pop 2000	Pop 2010	Pop 2020	% 2000	% 2010	% 2020
White alone (NH)	28,750	29,731	27,211	97.56%	96.62%	92.37%
Black or African American alone (NH)	70	70	166	0.23%	0.22%	0.56%
Native American or Alaska Native alone (NH)	108	113	73	0.36%	0.36%	0.24%
Asian alone (NH)	125	129	383	0.42%	0.41%	1.30%
Pacific Islander alone (NH)	6	10	23	0.02%	0.03%	0.07%
Other race alone (NH)	23	15	109	0.07%	0.04%	0.37%
Mixed race or Multiracial (NH)	226	385	1,084	0.76%	1.25%	3.68%
Hispanic or Latino (any race)	159	315	407	0.53%	1.02%	1.38%
Total	29,467	30,768	29,456	100.00%	100.00%	100.00%

=== 2015 ===
As of 2015 the largest self-reported ancestry groups in Franklin County, Maine are:

Largest ancestries (2015)	Percent
English (England)	22.4%
French or French Canadian (France)	19.1%
Irish (Republic of Ireland)	14.9%
"American" (United States)	8.5%
German (Germany)	6.1%
Scottish (Scotland)	5.0%
Italian (Italy)	4.2%
Scots-Irish (Ulster)	1.7%

=== 2010 census ===
As of the 2010 United States census, there were 30,768 people, 13,000 households, and 8,129 families living in the county. The population density was 18.1 inhabitants per square mile (7.0/km^{2}). There were 21,709 housing units at an average density of 12.8 per square mile (4.9/km^{2}). The racial makeup of the county was 97.3% white, 0.4% Asian, 0.4% American Indian, 0.2% black or African American, 0.2% from other races, and 1.4% from two or more races. Those of Hispanic or Latino origin made up 1.0% of the population. In terms of ancestry, 23.3% were English, 14.2% were Irish, 7.7% were French Canadian, 7.5% were German, 6.4% were Scottish, and 5.0% were American.

Of the 13,000 households, 26.2% had children under the age of 18 living with them, 48.6% were married couples living together, 9.4% had a female householder with no husband present, 37.5% were non-families, and 28.9% of all households were made up of individuals. The average household size was 2.28 and the average family size was 2.76. The median age was 43.4 years.

The median income for a household in the county was $39,831 and the median income for a family was $48,634. Males had a median income of $38,563 versus $30,024 for females. The per capita income for the county was $20,838. About 10.2% of families and 15.5% of the population were below the poverty line, including 21.2% of those under age 18 and 8.8% of those age 65 or over.

=== 2000 census ===
As of the census of 2000, there were 29,467 people, 11,806 households, and 7,744 families living in the county. The population density was 17 people per square mile (6.6 people/km^{2}). There were 19,159 housing units at an average density of 11 per square mile (4.2/km^{2}). The racial makeup of the county was 97.96% White, 0.24% Black or African American, 0.37% Native American, 0.43% Asian, 0.02% Pacific Islander, 0.17% from other races, and 0.81% from two or more races. 0.54% of the population were Hispanic or Latino of any race. 26.3% were of English, 13.8% United States or American, 12.2% French, 9.2% Irish, 7.9% French Canadian, and 5.3% Scottish ancestry according to Census 2000. 95.7% spoke English and 2.9% French as their first language.

There were 11,806 households, out of which 29.50% had children under the age of 18 living with them, 52.40% were married couples living together, 9.20% had a female householder with no husband present, and 34.40% were non-families. 25.80% of all households were made up of individuals, and 10.50% had someone living alone who was 65 years of age or older. The average household size was 2.40 and the average family size was 2.88.

In the county, the population was spread out, with 23.50% under the age of 18, 11.10% from 18 to 24, 26.40% from 25 to 44, 24.80% from 45 to 64, and 14.20% who were 65 years of age or older. The median age was 38 years. For every 100 females there were 93.40 males. For every 100 females age 18 and over, there were 89.20 males.

The median income for a household in the county was $31,459, and the median income for a family was $37,863. Males had a median income of $30,475 versus $20,442 for females. The per capita income for the county was $15,796. About 10.70% of families and 14.60% of the population were below the poverty line, including 17.90% of those under age 18 and 9.50% of those age 65 or over.

== Politics ==
Historically, like much of Maine, Franklin County was strongly Republican. For over 100 years after the founding of the Republican Party in 1854, the county voted against the Republican nominee for President just once, in 1912 when Progressive Theodore Roosevelt (a former Republican) carried the county. It voted for Democratic nominee Lyndon B. Johnson in 1964 as part of his major landslide victory. It would also go Democratic in 1968, an election in which Democratic nominee Hubert Humphrey chose Maine Senator Edmund Muskie as his running mate. The county snapped back to the Republicans for every election from 1972 to 1988, before voting Democratic for each election between 1992 and 2012. The county backed the statewide winner in every election from 1916 to 2012.

In 2016, the county deviated from the state as whole for the first time in over 100 years by voting for Republican Donald Trump even as the state was carried by Democrat Hillary Clinton. This trend continued in 2020, with the county again backing Trump even as the state voted for Joe Biden, and in 2024 Trump won the county again by an even larger margin of over 8 points.

=== Voter registration ===
Voter registration and party enrollment as of March 2024
Republican	7,439	35.81%
Unenrolled	6,210	29.89%
Democratic	5,985	28.81%
Green Independent	924	4.45%
No Labels	166	0.8%
Libertarian	52	0.25%
Total	20,776	100%

United States presidential election results for Franklin County, Maine
Year	Republican		Democratic		Third party(ies)	
Year	No.	%	No.	%	No.	%
1840	1,848	47.05%	2,058	52.39%	22	0.56%
1844	1,132	36.13%	1,609	51.36%	392	12.51%
1848	886	28.33%	1,431	45.76%	810	25.90%
1852	997	34.34%	1,310	45.13%	596	20.53%
1856	2,529	64.71%	1,358	34.75%	21	0.54%
1860	2,281	61.68%	1,358	36.72%	59	1.60%
1864	2,248	55.67%	1,790	44.33%	0	0.00%
1868	2,429	63.32%	1,407	36.68%	0	0.00%
1872	2,187	70.30%	924	29.70%	0	0.00%
1876	2,116	57.58%	1,559	42.42%	0	0.00%
1880	2,390	51.49%	2,178	46.92%	74	1.59%
1884	2,387	57.80%	1,375	33.29%	368	8.91%
1888	2,485	60.95%	1,518	37.23%	74	1.82%
1892	1,964	55.50%	1,456	41.14%	119	3.36%
1896	2,578	72.60%	886	24.95%	87	2.45%
1900	2,235	65.99%	1,085	32.03%	67	1.98%
1904	2,135	72.25%	755	25.55%	65	2.20%
1908	2,173	68.40%	930	29.27%	74	2.33%
1912	668	17.57%	1,421	37.37%	1,714	45.07%
1916	1,988	49.89%	1,908	47.88%	89	2.23%
1920	3,820	69.13%	1,668	30.18%	38	0.69%
1924	3,389	72.40%	1,123	23.99%	169	3.61%
1928	4,923	76.54%	1,487	23.12%	22	0.34%
1932	4,521	58.46%	3,171	41.01%	41	0.53%
1936	4,957	62.53%	2,859	36.06%	112	1.41%
1940	4,548	58.47%	3,224	41.44%	7	0.09%
1944	4,127	60.90%	2,646	39.04%	4	0.06%
1948	3,741	63.19%	2,135	36.06%	44	0.74%
1952	5,885	73.23%	2,137	26.59%	14	0.17%
1956	6,307	78.97%	1,680	21.03%	0	0.00%
1960	6,136	65.00%	3,304	35.00%	0	0.00%
1964	2,887	33.29%	5,784	66.69%	2	0.02%
1968	4,127	48.01%	4,307	50.10%	162	1.88%
1972	5,958	66.50%	2,988	33.35%	14	0.16%
1976	5,799	50.94%	5,140	45.15%	445	3.91%
1980	5,680	46.83%	4,979	41.05%	1,469	12.11%
1984	8,330	62.40%	4,954	37.11%	65	0.49%
1988	7,180	54.16%	5,960	44.96%	116	0.88%
1992	4,608	27.89%	6,739	40.79%	5,176	31.33%
1996	3,757	25.74%	7,759	53.16%	3,080	21.10%
2000	6,459	41.81%	7,593	49.15%	1,396	9.04%
2004	7,378	42.74%	9,465	54.83%	418	2.42%
2008	6,627	38.58%	10,113	58.87%	438	2.55%
2012	6,369	39.12%	9,367	57.53%	546	3.35%
2016	7,918	48.02%	7,016	42.55%	1,554	9.43%
2020	8,754	50.34%	8,069	46.40%	567	3.26%
2024	9,459	53.03%	7,990	44.80%	387	2.17%

== Government ==
Franklin County is governed by a five-member county commission. Commissioners meet at 10am on the first and third Tuesday of each month and are elected in the November general election, serving four year terms. Currently, the five commissioners are:

District One: Tom Saviello (Temple, Wilton, and the portion of Farmington located on the west side of the Sandy River)

District Two: Fen Fowler (The portion of Farmington located on the east side of the Sandy River)

District Three: Tom Skolfield (Avon, Carthage, Coplin Plantation, Eustis, North Franklin, Phillips, Strong, Rangeley, Rangeley Plantation, Sandy River Planation, South Franklin, Weld and Central Franklin)

District Four: Bob Carlton (Carrabassett Valley, Dallas Plantation, East Central Franklin, Industry, Kingfield, New Sharon, New Vineyard, and Wyman Township)

District Five: Jeff Gilbert (Chesterville and Jay)

Franklin County belongs to Maine Prosecutorial District Three, which is composed of Franklin, Oxford and Androscoggin Counties. The current district attorney is Andrew S. Robinson, of Farmington who was elected to his first term in 2014. The deputy district attorney is James A. Andrews, who was appointed to that post by Robinson in 2015.

The current county treasurer is Pamela Prodan. She was elected to that position in 2014 and will serve a four term through December 2018. Prodan succeeded Mary Frank, who decided to retire instead of running for a second term. The duties of county treasurer include: overseeing fiscal accounting matters, including paying bills, collecting amounts owed the county, reserve/investment accounts, maintaining the county's financial records and other matters related to the county's finances.

== Law enforcement ==
Only five municipalities in Franklin County have their own police department (Carrabassett Valley, Farmington, Jay, Rangeley, and Wilton). The Franklin County Sheriff's Department is responsible for patrol and emergency calls in the remaining communities in the county without their own agency. The current sheriff is Scott Nichols, of New Sharon. Nichols was elected to that post in November 2012, defeating incumbent sheriff, Dennis Pike. Pike had spent 46 years in Franklin County law enforcement prior to being defeated by Nichols.

The status of the Franklin County Jail has been contentiously debated issue within the county and state for several years. In 2008, Governor John Baldacci signed into law a bill which consolidated county jails in an effort to reduce costs. As a result, the Franklin County jail was designated a 72-hour holding facility. Any inmates who needed to be held longer than the three-day maximum had to be transported to the Somerset County Jail in East Madison, which county jail officials said was a waste of department time and money. Jail consolidation has also led to jail overcrowding statewide. When the Somerset Jail reached its maximum capacity, inmates were forced to be transported to another jail within the state, sometimes hours away which Franklin County officials again said wasted time and money.

In 2012, the Somerset County Commissioners voted not to accept any more inmates from outside the county as the state Board of Corrections withheld its third quarter payment. While the vote allowed current inmates to stay at the jail, it required all future inmates to be sent to Two Bridges Regional Jail in Wiscasset. In 2013, the Maine Legislature's Public Safety and Criminal Justice Committee voted 11–0 to allow the Franklin County jail to return to full service status.

In 2014, the Franklin County Commissioners voted to withhold all payments to the state for jail inmates. Public outrage over the jail issue also pressured the state to give the county full service rights. In 2014 an 800-member Facebook group was created and several protests were staged in front of the county courthouse. In 2015, the State Board of Corrections voted to grant the county a fully operational jail, officially ending the seven year conflict between the county and the state.

== Communities ==
=== Towns ===
- Avon
- Carrabassett Valley
- Carthage
- Chesterville
- Eustis
- Farmington
- Industry
- Jay
- Kingfield
- New Sharon
- New Vineyard
- Phillips
- Rangeley
- Strong
- Temple
- Weld
- Wilton

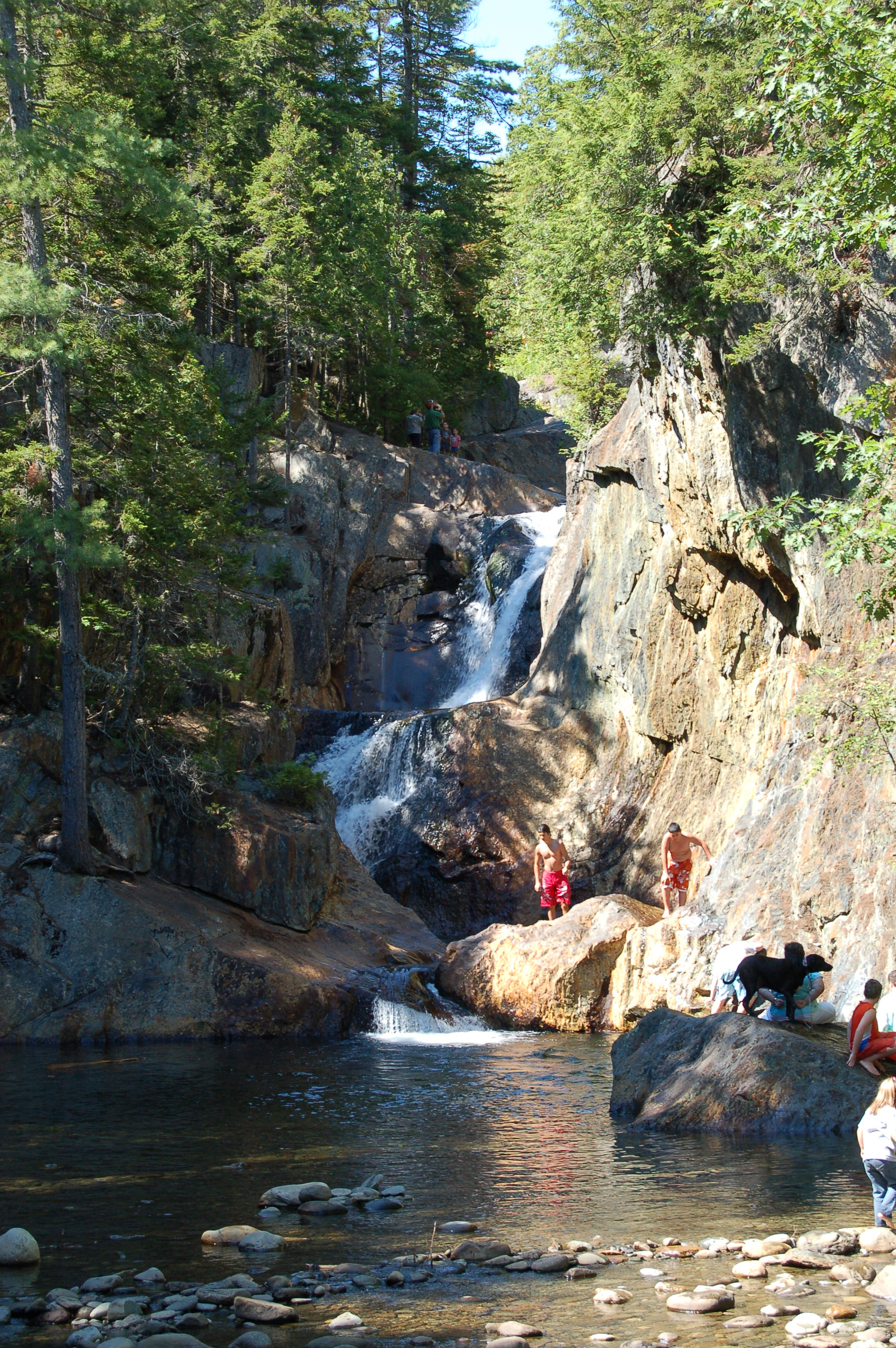
Smalls Falls Rest Area on Route 4 just south of Rangeley, Maine

=== Plantations ===
- Coplin Plantation
- Dallas Plantation
- Rangeley Plantation
- Sandy River Plantation

=== Census-designated places ===
- Chisholm
- Farmington
- Kingfield
- Rangeley
- Wilton

=== Unorganized territories ===
- East Central Franklin
- North Franklin
- South Franklin
- West Central Franklin
- Wyman

=== Unincorporated communities ===
- Dryden
- East Dixfield
- East Wilton
- Farmington Falls
- Freeman
- Macy
- Madrid
- Mooselookmeguntic
- North Jay
- Oquossoc

== Education ==
School districts include:

- Carrabassett Valley School District
- Coplin Plantation School District
- Eustis School District
- Regional School Unit 56
- Regional School Unit 73
- Regional School Unit 78
- School Administrative District 09
- School Administrative District 58

There is also the Franklin Unorganized Territory. Unorganized territory is not in any municipality. The Maine Department of Education takes responsibility for coordinating school assignments in the unorganized territory.
