= New Vineyard, Maine =

Town in Maine, United States

- Town
- Location within the state of Maine
- Coordinates: 44°46′52″N 70°08′23″W
- Country: United States
- State: Maine
- County: Franklin

Area
  - Total: 36.22 sq mi (93.81 km^{2})
  - Land: 35.74 sq mi (92.57 km^{2})
  - Water: 0.48 sq mi (1.24 km^{2})
- Elevation: 899 ft (274 m)

Population (2020)
  - Total: 721
  - Density: 20/sq mi (7.8/km^{2})
- Time zone: UTC-5 (Eastern (EST))
  - Summer (DST): UTC-4 (EDT)
- ZIP code: 04956
- Area code: 207
- FIPS code: 23-49520
- GNIS feature ID: 582626
- Website: www.newvineyardme.org

New Vineyard is a town in Franklin County, Maine, United States. The population was 721 at the 2020 census.

== Geography ==
According to the United States Census Bureau, the town has a total area of 36.22 square miles (93.81 km^{2}), of which 35.74 square miles (92.57 km^{2}) is land and is water.

The main road passing through New Vineyard is route 27. The lake in New Vineyard is called Porter Lake.

== Demographics ==
Historical population
Census	Pop.	Note	%±
1800	336		—
1810	484		44.0%
1820	591		22.1%
1830	869		47.0%
1840	927		6.7%
1850	635		−31.5%
1860	864		36.1%
1870	755		−12.6%
1880	788		4.4%
1890	660		−16.2%
1900	584		−11.5%
1910	543		−7.0%
1920	471		−13.3%
1930	447		−5.1%
1940	486		8.7%
1950	447		−8.0%
1960	357		−20.1%
1970	444		24.4%
1980	607		36.7%
1990	661		8.9%
2000	725		9.7%
2010	757		4.4%
2020	721		−4.8%
U.S. Decennial Census

=== 2010 census ===
As of the census of 2010, there were 757 people, 325 households, and 216 families living in the town. The population density was 21.2 inhabitants per square mile (8.2/km^{2}). There were 503 housing units at an average density of 14.1 per square mile (5.4/km^{2}). The racial makeup of the town was 96.2% White, 0.4% Native American, 0.5% Asian, and 2.9% from two or more races. Hispanic or Latino of any race were 0.7% of the population.

There were 325 households, of which 27.4% had children under the age of 18 living with them, 55.4% were married couples living together, 7.4% had a female householder with no husband present, 3.7% had a male householder with no wife present, and 33.5% were non-families. 26.5% of all households were made up of individuals, and 9.2% had someone living alone who was 65 years of age or older. The average household size was 2.33 and the average family size was 2.76.

The median age in the town was 46 years. 20.7% of residents were under the age of 18; 7.5% were between the ages of 18 and 24; 20.6% were from 25 to 44; 37% were from 45 to 64; and 14.1% were 65 years of age or older. The gender makeup of the town was 48.2% male and 51.8% female.

=== 2000 census ===
As of the census of 2000, there were 725 people, 279 households, and 198 families living in the town. The population density was 20.2 people per square mile (7.8/km^{2}). There were 432 housing units at an average density of 12.0 per square mile (4.7/km^{2}). The racial makeup of the town was 98.07% White, 0.41% African American, 0.14% Native American, 0.14% Asian, 0.14% from other races, and 1.10% from two or more races. Hispanic or Latino of any race were 0.28% of the population.

There were 279 households, out of which 34.1% had children under the age of 18 living with them, 59.9% were married couples living together, 7.2% had a female householder with no husband present, and 29.0% were non-families. 21.5% of all households were made up of individuals, and 8.2% had someone living alone who was 65 years of age or older. The average household size was 2.60 and the average family size was 3.07.

In the town, the population was spread out, with 28.4% under the age of 18, 7.0% from 18 to 24, 26.9% from 25 to 44, 27.2% from 45 to 64, and 10.5% who were 65 years of age or older. The median age was 39 years. For every 100 females, there were 95.4 males. For every 100 females age 18 and over, there were 98.9 males.

The median income for a household in the town was $29,688, and the median income for a family was $33,646. Males had a median income of $26,776 versus $18,250 for females. The per capita income for the town was $15,268. About 11.4% of families and 14.0% of the population were below the poverty line, including 12.2% of those under age 18 and 21.4% of those age 65 or over.
