= Farmington (CDP), Maine =

Farmington, Maine
- Census-designated place
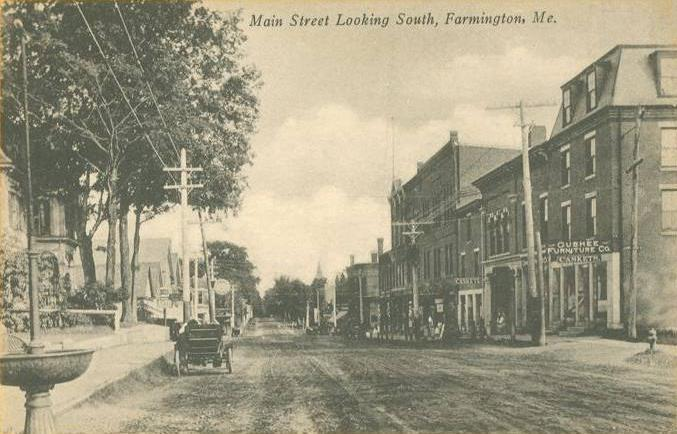
- Main Street

- Location within Maine Location within the United States
- Coordinates: 44°40′35″N 70°08′17″W
- Country: United States
- State: Maine
- County: Franklin
- Town: Farmington

Area
  - Total: 4.05 sq mi (10.48 km^{2})
  - Land: 4.03 sq mi (10.45 km^{2})
  - Water: 0.012 sq mi (0.03 km^{2})
- Elevation: 397 ft (121 m)

Population (2020)
  - Total: 4,168
  - Density: 1,032.9/sq mi (398.79/km^{2})
- Time zone: UTC-5 (Eastern (EST))
  - Summer (DST): UTC-4 (EDT)
- ZIP Codes: 04938 (Farmington); 04992 (West Farmington)
- Area code: 207
- FIPS code: 23-24740
- GNIS feature ID: 2377909

Farmington is a census-designated place (CDP) comprising the center of the town of Farmington, which is the county seat of Franklin County in Maine, United States. The population of the CDP was 4,288 at the 2010 census, out of 7,760 people in the town as a whole. The University of Maine at Farmington is located within the CDP.

== Geography ==
The Farmington CDP is located at the geographic center of the town of Farmington. U.S. Route 2 passes through the southern part of the CDP, leading east 27 miles (43 km) to Skowhegan and west 30 miles (48 km) to Rumford. Maine State Route 4 runs through the center of the CDP, leading northwest 40 miles (64 km) to Rangeley and south 46 miles (74 km) to Lewiston. Maine State Route 27 also runs through the center of town, following ME 4 out of town to the north and US 2 out of town to the southeast; ME 27 leads north 72 miles (116 km) to the Canada–US border at Coburn Gore and southeast 37 miles (60 km) to Augusta, the state capital.

According to the United States Census Bureau, the Farmington CDP has a total area of 4.05 square miles (10.48 km^{2}), of which 4.03 square miles (10.45 km^{2}) is land and 0.01 square miles (0.03 km^{2}), or 0.24%, is water. The Sandy River, a tributary of the Kennebec River, flows from north to south through the western side of the CDP. West Farmington, a neighborhood included within the CDP, is on the west side of the river, across from the town center, connected by a bridge on US 2. Temple Stream joins the Sandy River from the west in the southwestern part of the CDP.

== Demographics ==
Historical population
Census	Pop.	Note	%±
2020	4,168		—
U.S. Decennial Census

As of the census of 2000, there were 4,098 people, 1,568 households, and 625 families residing in the CDP. The population density was 1,015.8 inhabitants per square mile (392.2/km^{2}). There were 1,668 housing units at an average density of 413.4 per square mile (159.6/km^{2}). The racial makeup of the CDP was 96.88% White, 0.37% Black or African American, 0.32% Native American, 0.93% Asian, 0.24% from other races, and 1.27% from two or more races. Hispanic or Latino of any race were 0.85% of the population.

There were 1,568 households, out of which 18.2% had children under the age of 18 living with them, 28.4% were married couples living together, 9.2% had a female householder with no husband present, and 60.1% were non-families. 40.8% of all households were made up of individuals, and 15.6% had someone living alone who was 65 years of age or older. The average household size was 1.99 and the average family size was 2.72.

In the CDP, the population was spread out, with 12.7% under the age of 18, 39.6% from 18 to 24, 17.3% from 25 to 44, 13.8% from 45 to 64, and 16.6% who were 65 years of age or older. The median age was 24 years. For every 100 females, there were 69.8 males. For every 100 females age 18 and over, there were 64.7 males.

The median income for a household in the CDP was $22,130, and the median income for a family was $31,471. Males had a median income of $31,296 versus $20,385 for females. The per capita income for the CDP was $12,455. About 31.3% of families and 33.4% of the population were below the poverty line, including 46.6% of those under age 18 and 4.6% of those age 65 or over.
