= Maine State Route 152 =

State highway in Somerset County, Maine, US

State Route 152

Route information
- Maintained by MaineDOT
- Length: 20.34 mi (32.73 km)
- Existed: 1925–present

Major junctions
- South end: SR 11 / SR 100 in Pittsfield
- US 2 in Palmyra; SR 23 / SR 43 / SR 151 in Hartland; SR 154 in Ripley
- North end: SR 150 in Cambridge

Location
- Country: United States
- State: Maine
- Counties: Somerset

Highway system
- Maine State Highway System; Interstate; US; State; Auto trails; Lettered highways
← SR 151	→ SR 153

State Route 152 (SR 152) is part of Maine's system of numbered state highways, located in Somerset County. It runs from SR 11 and SR 100 in Pittsfield to SR 150 in Cambridge. The route is 20.3 miles (32.7 km) long. It was first established in 1925 and the route has not changed since.

== Junction list ==
The entire route is in Somerset County.

Location	mi	km	Destinations	Notes
Pittsfield	0.00	0.00	SR 11 / SR 100 to SR 69 – Newport, Burnham	Southern terminus of SR 152
Palmyra	3.7	6.0	US 2 – Skowhegan, Palmyra	
Hartland	7.9	12.7	SR 23 south / SR 43 west / SR 151 north – Athens, Canaan	Southern end of SR 23/SR 43/SR 151 concurrency
Hartland	8.1	13.0	SR 151 south – Palmyra	Northern end of SR 151 concurrency
St. Albans	10.9	17.5	SR 43 east – Corinna	Northern end of SR 43 concurrency
Ripley	16.1	25.9	SR 23 north / SR 154 east – Dexter	Northern end of SR 23 concurrency; Southern end of SR 154 concurrency
Ripley	16.3	26.2	SR 154 west – Harmony	Northern end of SR 154 concurrency
Cambridge	20.31	32.69	SR 150 – Parkman, Harmony	Northern terminus of SR 152
1.000 mi = 1.609 km; 1.000 km = 0.621 mi: Concurrency terminus
