= List of municipalities in Massachusetts =

Municipalities of Massachusetts
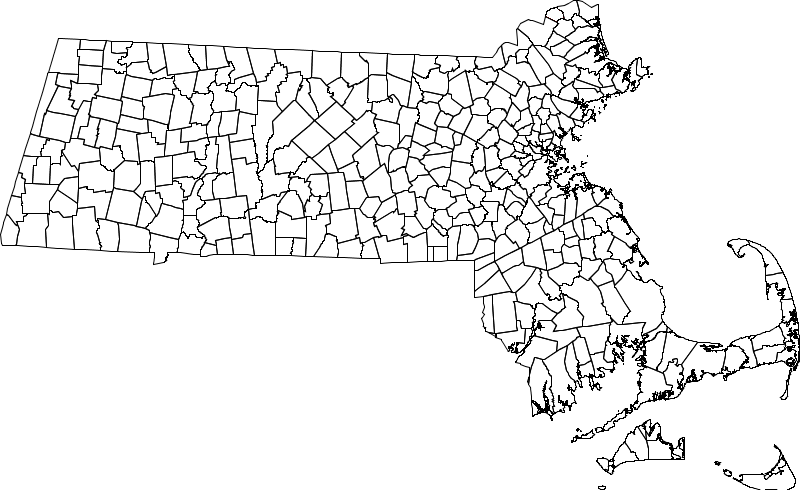
- Category: Municipality
- Location: Commonwealth of Massachusetts
- Found in: County
- Created: 1620 (Plymouth)
- Number: 351
- Possible types: City; Town
- Populations: 70 (Gosnold) – 675,647 (Boston)
- Areas: 1.0 square mile (2.6 km^{2}) (Nahant) – 96.5 square miles (250 km^{2}) (Plymouth)
- Government: Council–manager; Town meeting; Mayor–council; Select Board
- Subdivisions: Village; Neighborhood

Massachusetts is a state located in the Northeastern United States. Municipalities in the state are classified as either towns or cities, distinguished by their form of government under state law. Towns have an open town meeting or representative town meeting form of government; cities, on the other hand, use a mayor-council or council-manager form. Based on the form of government, as of 2023, there are 292 towns and 59 cities in Massachusetts. Over time, many towns have voted to become cities; 14 municipalities still refer to themselves as "towns" even though they have a city form of government.

The Census Bureau classifies towns in Massachusetts as a type of "minor civil division" and cities as a type of "populated place". However, from the perspective of Massachusetts law, politics, and geography, cities and towns are the same type of municipal unit, differing primarily in their form of government and some state laws which set different rules for each type.

There is no unincorporated land in Massachusetts. The land area of the state is completely divided up among the 351 municipalities.

== Largest cities ==
Largest cities or towns in Massachusetts 2020 United States census (April 1, 2020)
Rank	Name	County	Pop.	Rank	Name	County	Pop.
1	Boston	Suffolk	675,647	11	Lawrence	Essex	89,143
2	Worcester	Worcester	206,518	12	Newton	Middlesex	88,923
3	Springfield	Hampden	155,929	13	Somerville	Middlesex	81,045
4	Cambridge	Middlesex	118,403	14	Framingham	Middlesex	72,362
5	Lowell	Middlesex	115,554	15	Haverhill	Essex	67,787
6	Brockton	Plymouth	105,643	16	Malden	Middlesex	66,263
7	Quincy	Norfolk	101,636	17	Waltham	Middlesex	65,218
8	Lynn	Essex	101,253	18	Brookline	Norfolk	63,191
9	New Bedford	Bristol	101,079	19	Revere	Suffolk	62,186
10	Fall River	Bristol	94,000	20	Plymouth	Plymouth	61,217

== List of municipalities ==
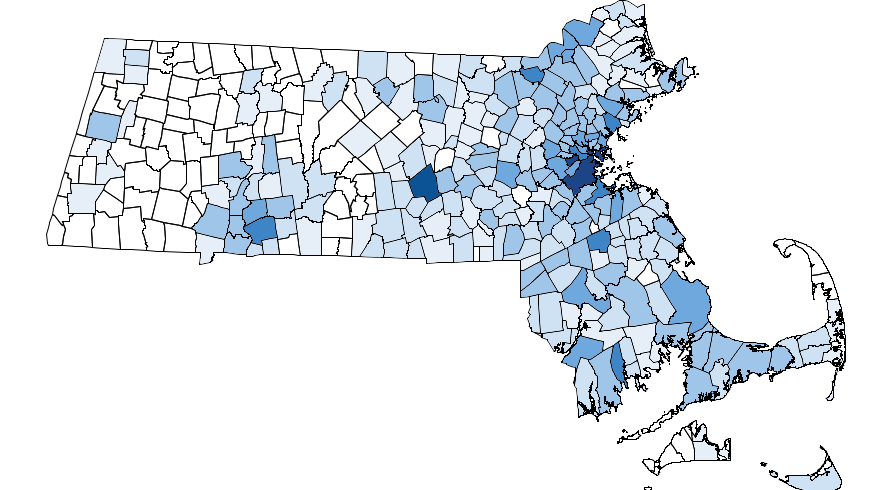
Massachusetts towns by population, where darker towns are more populous, according to 2020 census data.

Municipality	Type	County	Form of government	Population (2020)	Population (2010)	Change	Total area	Land area	Year established
Boston	City (capital)	Suffolk (seat)	Mayor-Council	675,647	617,594	+9.4%	89.6 sq mi (232.06 km^{2})	48.3 sq mi (125.10 km^{2})	1630
Worcester	City	Worcester (seat)	Mayor-Manager-Council	206,518	181,045	+14.1%	38.5 sq mi (99.71 km^{2})	37.4 sq mi (96.87 km^{2})	1722
Springfield	City	Hampden (seat)	Mayor-Council	155,929	153,060	+1.9%	33.1 sq mi (85.73 km^{2})	31.9 sq mi (82.62 km^{2})	1636
Cambridge	City	Middlesex (seat)	Mayor-Manager-Council	118,403	105,162	+12.6%	7.1 sq mi (18.39 km^{2})	6.4 sq mi (16.58 km^{2})	1636
Lowell	City	Middlesex (seat)	Mayor-Manager-Council	115,554	106,519	+8.5%	14.5 sq mi (37.55 km^{2})	13.6 sq mi (35.22 km^{2})	1826
Brockton	City	Plymouth (seat)	Mayor-Council	105,643	93,810	+12.6%	21.5 sq mi (55.68 km^{2})	21.3 sq mi (55.17 km^{2})	1821
Quincy	City	Norfolk	Mayor-Council	101,636	92,271	+10.1%	26.9 sq mi (69.67 km^{2})	16.6 sq mi (42.99 km^{2})	1792
Lynn	City	Essex	Mayor-Council	101,253	90,329	+12.1%	13.5 sq mi (34.96 km^{2})	10.7 sq mi (27.71 km^{2})	1629
New Bedford	City	Bristol	Mayor-Council	101,079	95,072	+6.3%	24.1 sq mi (62.42 km^{2})	20.0 sq mi (51.80 km^{2})	1787
Fall River	City	Bristol	Mayor-Council	94,000	88,857	+5.8%	40.2 sq mi (104.12 km^{2})	33.1 sq mi (85.73 km^{2})	1803
Lawrence	City	Essex (seat)	Mayor-Council	89,143	76,377	+16.7%	7.4 sq mi (19.17 km^{2})	6.9 sq mi (17.87 km^{2})	1847
Newton	City	Middlesex	Mayor-Council	88,923	85,146	+4.4%	18.2 sq mi (47.14 km^{2})	17.8 sq mi (46.10 km^{2})	1688
Somerville	City	Middlesex	Mayor-Council	81,045	75,754	+7.0%	4.2 sq mi (10.88 km^{2})	4.1 sq mi (10.62 km^{2})	1842
Framingham	City	Middlesex	Mayor-Council	72,326	68,318	+5.9%	26.5 sq mi (68.63 km^{2})	25.0 sq mi (64.75 km^{2})	1700
Haverhill	City	Essex	Mayor-Council	67,787	60,879	+11.3%	35.7 sq mi (92.46 km^{2})	33.0 sq mi (85.47 km^{2})	1641
Malden	City	Middlesex	Mayor-Council	66,263	59,450	+11.5%	5.1 sq mi (13.21 km^{2})	5.0 sq mi (12.95 km^{2})	1649
Waltham	City	Middlesex	Mayor-Council	65,218	60,632	+7.6%	13.8 sq mi (35.74 km^{2})	12.7 sq mi (32.89 km^{2})	1738
Brookline	Town	Norfolk	Representative town meeting	63,191	58,732	+7.6%	6.8 sq mi (17.61 km^{2})	6.8 sq mi (17.61 km^{2})	1705
Revere	City	Suffolk	Mayor-Council	62,186	51,755	+20.2%	10.1 sq mi (26.16 km^{2})	5.7 sq mi (14.76 km^{2})	1846
Plymouth	Town	Plymouth (seat)	Representative town meeting	61,217	56,468	+8.4%	134.0 sq mi (347.06 km^{2})	96.5 sq mi (249.93 km^{2})	1620
Medford	City	Middlesex	Mayor-Council	59,659	56,173	+6.2%	8.7 sq mi (22.53 km^{2})	8.1 sq mi (20.98 km^{2})	1630
Taunton	City	Bristol (seat)	Mayor-Council	59,408	55,874	+6.3%	48.4 sq mi (125.36 km^{2})	46.7 sq mi (120.95 km^{2})	1639
Weymouth	City	Norfolk	Mayor-Council	57,473	53,743	+6.9%	21.6 sq mi (55.94 km^{2})	16.8 sq mi (43.51 km^{2})	1635
Chicopee	City	Hampden	Mayor-Council	55,560	55,298	+0.5%	23.9 sq mi (61.90 km^{2})	22.9 sq mi (59.31 km^{2})	1848
Peabody	City	Essex	Mayor-Council	54,418	51,251	+6.2%	16.8 sq mi (43.51 km^{2})	16.2 sq mi (41.96 km^{2})	1868
Methuen	City	Essex	Mayor-Council	53,039	47,255	+12.2%	23.0 sq mi (59.57 km^{2})	22.2 sq mi (57.50 km^{2})	1725
Everett	City	Middlesex	Mayor-Council	49,075	41,667	+17.8%	3.7 sq mi (9.58 km^{2})	3.4 sq mi (8.81 km^{2})	1870
Barnstable	City	Barnstable (seat)	Manager-Council	48,916	45,193	+8.2%	76.5 sq mi (198.13 km^{2})	59.3 sq mi (153.59 km^{2})	1639
Attleboro	City	Bristol	Mayor-Council	46,461	43,593	+6.6%	27.8 sq mi (72.00 km^{2})	26.8 sq mi (69.41 km^{2})	1694
Arlington	Town	Middlesex	Representative town meeting	46,308	42,844	+8.1%	5.5 sq mi (14.24 km^{2})	5.0 sq mi (12.95 km^{2})	1807
Salem	City	Essex (seat)	Mayor-Council	44,480	41,340	+7.6%	18.3 sq mi (47.40 km^{2})	8.3 sq mi (21.50 km^{2})	1626
Pittsfield	City	Berkshire (seat)	Mayor-Council	43,927	44,737	−1.8%	42.5 sq mi (110.07 km^{2})	40.5 sq mi (104.89 km^{2})	1761
Leominster	City	Worcester	Mayor-Council	43,782	40,759	+7.4%	29.7 sq mi (76.92 km^{2})	28.9 sq mi (74.85 km^{2})	1740
Beverly	City	Essex	Mayor-Council	42,670	39,502	+8.0%	22.6 sq mi (58.53 km^{2})	15.1 sq mi (39.11 km^{2})	1668
Billerica	Town	Middlesex	Representative town meeting	42,119	40,243	+4.7%	26.4 sq mi (68.38 km^{2})	25.9 sq mi (67.08 km^{2})	1655
Fitchburg	City	Worcester	Mayor-Council	41,946	40,318	+4.0%	28.1 sq mi (72.78 km^{2})	27.8 sq mi (72.00 km^{2})	1764
Marlborough	City	Middlesex	Mayor-Council	41,793	38,499	+8.6%	22.1 sq mi (57.24 km^{2})	20.9 sq mi (54.13 km^{2})	1660
Woburn	City	Middlesex	Mayor-Council	40,876	38,120	+7.2%	12.9 sq mi (33.41 km^{2})	12.7 sq mi (32.89 km^{2})	1642
Westfield	City	Hampden	Mayor-Council	40,834	41,094	−0.6%	47.3 sq mi (122.51 km^{2})	46.3 sq mi (119.92 km^{2})	1669
Chelsea	City	Suffolk	Manager-Council	40,787	35,177	+15.9%	2.5 sq mi (6.47 km^{2})	2.2 sq mi (5.70 km^{2})	1739
Amherst	City	Hampshire	Manager-Council	39,263	37,819	+3.8%	27.7 sq mi (71.74 km^{2})	27.6 sq mi (71.48 km^{2})	1775
Braintree	City	Norfolk	Mayor-Council	39,143	35,744	+9.5%	14.6 sq mi (37.81 km^{2})	13.8 sq mi (35.74 km^{2})	1640
Shrewsbury	Town	Worcester	Representative town meeting	38,325	35,608	+7.6%	21.7 sq mi (56.20 km^{2})	20.7 sq mi (53.61 km^{2})	1727
Holyoke	City	Hampden	Mayor-Council	38,238	39,880	−4.1%	22.8 sq mi (59.05 km^{2})	21.2 sq mi (54.91 km^{2})	1850
Natick	Town	Middlesex	Representative town meeting	37,006	32,786	+12.9%	16.1 sq mi (41.70 km^{2})	15.1 sq mi (39.11 km^{2})	1781
Andover	Town	Essex	Open town meeting	36,569	33,201	+10.1%	32.1 sq mi (83.14 km^{2})	31.0 sq mi (80.29 km^{2})	1646
Chelmsford	Town	Middlesex	Representative town meeting	36,392	33,802	+7.7%	23.2 sq mi (60.09 km^{2})	22.7 sq mi (58.79 km^{2})	1655
Watertown	City	Middlesex	Manager-Council	35,329	31,915	+10.7%	4.1 sq mi (10.62 km^{2})	4.0 sq mi (10.36 km^{2})	1630
Randolph	City	Norfolk	Manager-Council	34,984	32,112	+8.9%	10.5 sq mi (27.19 km^{2})	10.1 sq mi (26.16 km^{2})	1793
Lexington	Town	Middlesex	Representative town meeting	34,454	31,394	+9.7%	16.5 sq mi (42.73 km^{2})	16.4 sq mi (42.48 km^{2})	1713
Dartmouth	Town	Bristol	Representative town meeting	33,783	34,032	−0.7%	97.5 sq mi (252.52 km^{2})	60.9 sq mi (157.73 km^{2})	1664
Franklin	City	Norfolk	Administrator-Council	33,261	31,635	+5.1%	27.0 sq mi (69.93 km^{2})	26.6 sq mi (68.89 km^{2})	1778
Dracut	Town	Middlesex	Open town meeting	32,617	29,457	+10.7%	21.4 sq mi (55.43 km^{2})	20.9 sq mi (54.13 km^{2})	1701
Falmouth	Town	Barnstable	Representative town meeting	32,517	31,531	+3.1%	54.4 sq mi (140.90 km^{2})	44.1 sq mi (114.22 km^{2})	1686
Needham	Town	Norfolk	Representative town meeting	32,091	28,886	+11.1%	12.7 sq mi (32.89 km^{2})	12.6 sq mi (32.63 km^{2})	1711
Norwood	Town	Norfolk	Representative town meeting	31,611	28,602	+10.5%	10.6 sq mi (27.45 km^{2})	10.5 sq mi (27.19 km^{2})	1872
Tewksbury	Town	Middlesex	Open town meeting	31,342	28,961	+8.2%	21.1 sq mi (54.65 km^{2})	20.7 sq mi (53.61 km^{2})	1734
North Andover	Town	Essex	Open town meeting	30,915	28,352	+9.0%	27.8 sq mi (72.00 km^{2})	26.3 sq mi (68.12 km^{2})	1855
North Attleborough	City	Bristol	Manager-Council	30,834	28,712	+7.4%	19.1 sq mi (49.47 km^{2})	18.6 sq mi (48.17 km^{2})	1887
Milford	Town	Worcester	Representative town meeting	30,379	27,999	+8.5%	14.9 sq mi (38.59 km^{2})	14.6 sq mi (37.81 km^{2})	1780
Melrose	City	Middlesex	Mayor-Council	29,817	26,983	+10.5%	4.8 sq mi (12.43 km^{2})	4.7 sq mi (12.17 km^{2})	1850
Gloucester	City	Essex	Mayor-Council	29,729	28,789	+3.3%	41.5 sq mi (107.48 km^{2})	26.2 sq mi (67.86 km^{2})	1623
Northampton	City	Hampshire (seat)	Mayor-Council	29,571	28,549	+3.6%	35.8 sq mi (92.72 km^{2})	34.2 sq mi (88.58 km^{2})	1654
Wellesley	Town	Norfolk	Representative town meeting	29,550	27,982	+5.6%	10.5 sq mi (27.19 km^{2})	10.2 sq mi (26.42 km^{2})	1881
Stoughton	Town	Norfolk	Representative town meeting	29,281	26,962	+8.6%	16.3 sq mi (42.22 km^{2})	16.0 sq mi (41.44 km^{2})	1726
West Springfield	City	Hampden	Mayor-Council	28,835	28,391	+1.6%	17.5 sq mi (45.32 km^{2})	16.7 sq mi (43.25 km^{2})	1774
Agawam	City	Hampden	Mayor-Council	28,692	28,438	+0.9%	24.3 sq mi (62.94 km^{2})	23.3 sq mi (60.35 km^{2})	1855
Bridgewater	City	Plymouth	Manager-Council	28,633	26,563	+7.8%	28.2 sq mi (73.04 km^{2})	27.5 sq mi (71.22 km^{2})	1656
Milton	Town	Norfolk	Representative town meeting	28,630	27,003	+6.0%	13.3 sq mi (34.45 km^{2})	13.0 sq mi (33.67 km^{2})	1662
Saugus	Town	Essex	Representative town meeting	28,619	26,628	+7.5%	11.8 sq mi (30.56 km^{2})	10.8 sq mi (27.97 km^{2})	1815
Danvers	Town	Essex	Representative town meeting	28,087	26,493	+6.0%	14.1 sq mi (36.52 km^{2})	13.3 sq mi (34.45 km^{2})	1775
Belmont	Town	Middlesex	Representative town meeting	27,295	24,729	+10.4%	4.7 sq mi (12.17 km^{2})	4.7 sq mi (12.17 km^{2})	1859
Wakefield	Town	Middlesex	Open town meeting	27,090	24,932	+8.7%	7.9 sq mi (20.46 km^{2})	7.5 sq mi (19.42 km^{2})	1812
Walpole	Town	Norfolk	Representative town meeting	26,383	24,070	+9.6%	21.0 sq mi (54.39 km^{2})	20.5 sq mi (53.09 km^{2})	1724
Burlington	Town	Middlesex	Representative town meeting	26,377	24,498	+7.7%	11.9 sq mi (30.82 km^{2})	11.8 sq mi (30.56 km^{2})	1799
Marshfield	Town	Plymouth	Open town meeting	25,825	25,132	+2.8%	31.7 sq mi (82.10 km^{2})	28.5 sq mi (73.81 km^{2})	1640
Reading	Town	Middlesex	Representative town meeting	25,518	24,747	+3.1%	9.9 sq mi (25.64 km^{2})	9.9 sq mi (25.64 km^{2})	1644
Dedham	Town	Norfolk (seat)	Representative town meeting	25,364	24,729	+2.6%	10.6 sq mi (27.45 km^{2})	10.5 sq mi (27.19 km^{2})	1636
Easton	Town	Bristol	Open town meeting	25,058	23,112	+8.4%	29.2 sq mi (75.63 km^{2})	28.4 sq mi (73.56 km^{2})	1725
Yarmouth	Town	Barnstable	Open town meeting	25,023	23,793	+5.2%	28.2 sq mi (73.04 km^{2})	24.1 sq mi (62.42 km^{2})	1639
Westford	Town	Middlesex	Open town meeting	24,643	21,951	+12.3%	31.3 sq mi (81.07 km^{2})	30.6 sq mi (79.25 km^{2})	1729
Canton	Town	Norfolk	Open town meeting	24,370	21,561	+13.0%	19.6 sq mi (50.76 km^{2})	18.9 sq mi (48.95 km^{2})	1797
Hingham	Town	Plymouth	Open town meeting	24,284	22,157	+9.6%	26.3 sq mi (68.12 km^{2})	22.2 sq mi (57.50 km^{2})	1635
Middleborough	Town	Plymouth	Open town meeting	24,245	23,116	+4.9%	72.2 sq mi (187.00 km^{2})	69.1 sq mi (178.97 km^{2})	1669
Acton	Town	Middlesex	Open town meeting	24,021	21,924	+9.6%	20.3 sq mi (52.58 km^{2})	20.0 sq mi (51.80 km^{2})	1735
Mansfield	Town	Bristol	Open town meeting	23,860	23,184	+2.9%	20.7 sq mi (53.61 km^{2})	20.5 sq mi (53.09 km^{2})	1775
Wilmington	Town	Middlesex	Open town meeting	23,349	22,325	+4.6%	17.2 sq mi (44.55 km^{2})	17.1 sq mi (44.29 km^{2})	1730
Wareham	Town	Plymouth	Open town meeting	23,303	21,822	+6.8%	46.3 sq mi (119.92 km^{2})	35.8 sq mi (92.72 km^{2})	1739
Stoneham	Town	Middlesex	Open town meeting	23,244	21,437	+8.4%	6.7 sq mi (17.35 km^{2})	6.2 sq mi (16.06 km^{2})	1725
Winchester	Town	Middlesex	Representative town meeting	22,970	21,374	+7.5%	6.3 sq mi (16.32 km^{2})	6.0 sq mi (15.54 km^{2})	1850
Westborough	Town	Worcester	Open town meeting	21,567	18,272	+18.0%	21.6 sq mi (55.94 km^{2})	20.5 sq mi (53.09 km^{2})	1717
Gardner	City	Worcester	Mayor-Council	21,287	20,228	+5.2%	23.0 sq mi (59.57 km^{2})	22.1 sq mi (57.24 km^{2})	1785
Ludlow	Town	Hampden	Representative town meeting	21,002	21,103	−0.5%	28.2 sq mi (73.04 km^{2})	27.2 sq mi (70.45 km^{2})	1775
Bourne	Town	Barnstable	Open town meeting	20,452	19,754	+3.5%	52.9 sq mi (137.01 km^{2})	40.7 sq mi (105.41 km^{2})	1884
Marblehead	Town	Essex	Open town meeting	20,441	19,808	+3.2%	19.6 sq mi (50.76 km^{2})	4.4 sq mi (11.40 km^{2})	1629
Sandwich	Town	Barnstable	Open town meeting	20,259	20,675	−2.0%	44.2 sq mi (114.48 km^{2})	42.7 sq mi (110.59 km^{2})	1638
Hudson	Town	Middlesex	Open town meeting	20,092	19,063	+5.4%	11.8 sq mi (30.56 km^{2})	11.5 sq mi (29.78 km^{2})	1866
Holden	Town	Worcester	Open town meeting	19,905	17,346	+14.8%	36.2 sq mi (93.76 km^{2})	35.0 sq mi (90.65 km^{2})	1741
Grafton	Town	Worcester	Open town meeting	19,664	17,765	+10.7%	23.3 sq mi (60.35 km^{2})	22.7 sq mi (58.79 km^{2})	1735
Winthrop	City	Suffolk	Manager-Council	19,316	17,497	+10.4%	8.3 sq mi (21.50 km^{2})	2.0 sq mi (5.18 km^{2})	1852
Norton	Town	Bristol	Open town meeting	19,202	19,031	+0.9%	29.8 sq mi (77.18 km^{2})	28.7 sq mi (74.33 km^{2})	1711
Scituate	Town	Plymouth	Open town meeting	19,063	18,133	+5.1%	31.8 sq mi (82.36 km^{2})	17.6 sq mi (45.58 km^{2})	1636
Sudbury	Town	Middlesex	Open town meeting	18,934	17,659	+7.2%	24.6 sq mi (63.71 km^{2})	24.4 sq mi (63.20 km^{2})	1639
Ashland	Town	Middlesex	Open town meeting	18,832	16,593	+13.5%	12.9 sq mi (33.41 km^{2})	12.4 sq mi (32.12 km^{2})	1846
Hopkinton	Town	Middlesex	Open town meeting	18,758	14,925	+25.7%	28.2 sq mi (73.04 km^{2})	26.6 sq mi (68.89 km^{2})	1715
Foxborough	Town	Norfolk	Open town meeting	18,618	16,865	+10.4%	20.9 sq mi (54.13 km^{2})	20.1 sq mi (52.06 km^{2})	1778
Sharon	Town	Norfolk	Open town meeting	18,575	17,612	+5.5%	24.2 sq mi (62.68 km^{2})	23.3 sq mi (60.35 km^{2})	1775
Concord	Town	Middlesex	Open town meeting	18,491	17,668	+4.7%	25.9 sq mi (67.08 km^{2})	24.9 sq mi (64.49 km^{2})	1635
Pembroke	Town	Plymouth	Open town meeting	18,360	17,837	+2.9%	23.5 sq mi (60.86 km^{2})	21.8 sq mi (56.46 km^{2})	1712
Somerset	Town	Bristol	Open town meeting	18,303	18,165	+0.8%	12.0 sq mi (31.08 km^{2})	8.1 sq mi (20.98 km^{2})	1790
Newburyport	City	Essex	Mayor-Council	18,289	17,416	+5.0%	10.7 sq mi (27.71 km^{2})	8.3 sq mi (21.50 km^{2})	1764
South Hadley	Town	Hampshire	Representative town meeting	18,150	17,514	+3.6%	18.4 sq mi (47.66 km^{2})	17.7 sq mi (45.84 km^{2})	1775
Rockland	Town	Plymouth	Open town meeting	17,803	17,489	+1.8%	10.1 sq mi (26.16 km^{2})	10.0 sq mi (25.90 km^{2})	1874
Webster	Town	Worcester	Open town meeting	17,776	16,767	+6.0%	14.5 sq mi (37.55 km^{2})	12.5 sq mi (32.37 km^{2})	1832
Greenfield	City	Franklin (seat)	Mayor-Council	17,768	17,456	+1.8%	21.9 sq mi (56.72 km^{2})	21.4 sq mi (55.43 km^{2})	1775
Southbridge	City	Worcester	Manager-Council	17,740	16,719	+6.1%	20.9 sq mi (54.13 km^{2})	20.2 sq mi (52.32 km^{2})	1816
Amesbury	City	Essex	Mayor-Council	17,366	16,283	+6.7%	13.7 sq mi (35.48 km^{2})	12.3 sq mi (31.86 km^{2})	1668
Swansea	Town	Bristol	Open town meeting	17,144	15,865	+8.1%	25.5 sq mi (66.04 km^{2})	23.1 sq mi (59.83 km^{2})	1667
Abington	Town	Plymouth	Open town meeting	17,062	15,985	+6.7%	9.9 sq mi (25.64 km^{2})	9.7 sq mi (25.12 km^{2})	1712
Bellingham	Town	Norfolk	Open town meeting	16,945	16,332	+3.8%	19.0 sq mi (49.21 km^{2})	18.5 sq mi (47.91 km^{2})	1719
Auburn	Town	Worcester	Representative town meeting	16,889	16,188	+4.3%	16.4 sq mi (42.48 km^{2})	15.4 sq mi (39.89 km^{2})	1778
East Longmeadow	City	Hampden	Manager-Council	16,430	15,720	+4.5%	13.0 sq mi (33.67 km^{2})	13.0 sq mi (33.67 km^{2})	1894
Westport	Town	Bristol	Open town meeting	16,339	15,532	+5.2%	64.4 sq mi (166.80 km^{2})	50.1 sq mi (129.76 km^{2})	1787
Northbridge	Town	Worcester	Open town meeting	16,335	15,707	+4.0%	18.1 sq mi (46.88 km^{2})	17.2 sq mi (44.55 km^{2})	1775
Westwood	Town	Norfolk	Open town meeting	16,266	14,618	+11.3%	11.1 sq mi (28.75 km^{2})	11.0 sq mi (28.49 km^{2})	1897
Easthampton	City	Hampshire	Mayor-Council	16,211	16,053	+1.0%	13.6 sq mi (35.22 km^{2})	13.3 sq mi (34.45 km^{2})	1809
Duxbury	Town	Plymouth	Open town meeting	16,090	15,059	+6.8%	37.6 sq mi (97.38 km^{2})	23.8 sq mi (61.64 km^{2})	1637
Fairhaven	Town	Bristol	Representative town meeting	15,924	15,873	+0.3%	14.1 sq mi (36.52 km^{2})	12.4 sq mi (32.12 km^{2})	1812
Longmeadow	Town	Hampden	Open town meeting	15,853	15,784	+0.4%	9.7 sq mi (25.12 km^{2})	9.1 sq mi (23.57 km^{2})	1783
Northborough	Town	Worcester	Open town meeting	15,741	14,155	+11.2%	18.8 sq mi (48.69 km^{2})	18.5 sq mi (47.91 km^{2})	1775
North Reading	Town	Middlesex	Open town meeting	15,554	14,892	+4.4%	13.5 sq mi (34.96 km^{2})	13.3 sq mi (34.45 km^{2})	1853
Seekonk	Town	Bristol	Open town meeting	15,531	13,722	+13.2%	18.3 sq mi (47.40 km^{2})	18.2 sq mi (47.14 km^{2})	1812
Clinton	Town	Worcester	Open town meeting	15,428	13,606	+13.4%	7.3 sq mi (18.91 km^{2})	5.7 sq mi (14.76 km^{2})	1850
Belchertown	Town	Hampshire	Open town meeting	15,350	14,649	+4.8%	55.4 sq mi (143.49 km^{2})	52.7 sq mi (136.49 km^{2})	1761
Raynham	Town	Bristol	Open town meeting	15,142	13,383	+13.1%	20.9 sq mi (54.13 km^{2})	20.5 sq mi (53.09 km^{2})	1731
Whitman	Town	Plymouth	Open town meeting	15,121	14,489	+4.4%	7.1 sq mi (18.39 km^{2})	7.0 sq mi (18.13 km^{2})	1875
Swampscott	Town	Essex	Representative town meeting	15,111	13,787	+9.6%	6.7 sq mi (17.35 km^{2})	3.1 sq mi (8.03 km^{2})	1852
Mashpee	Town	Barnstable	Open town meeting	15,060	14,006	+7.5%	27.2 sq mi (70.45 km^{2})	23.4 sq mi (60.61 km^{2})	1870
Holliston	Town	Middlesex	Open town meeting	14,996	13,547	+10.7%	19.0 sq mi (49.21 km^{2})	18.7 sq mi (48.43 km^{2})	1724
Hanover	Town	Plymouth	Open town meeting	14,833	13,879	+6.9%	15.7 sq mi (40.66 km^{2})	15.6 sq mi (40.40 km^{2})	1727
Dennis	Town	Barnstable	Open town meeting	14,674	14,207	+3.3%	22.3 sq mi (57.76 km^{2})	20.5 sq mi (53.09 km^{2})	1793
Wilbraham	Town	Hampden	Open town meeting	14,613	14,219	+2.8%	22.4 sq mi (58.02 km^{2})	22.2 sq mi (57.50 km^{2})	1763
East Bridgewater	Town	Plymouth	Open town meeting	14,440	13,794	+4.7%	17.5 sq mi (45.32 km^{2})	17.2 sq mi (44.55 km^{2})	1823
Bedford	Town	Middlesex	Open town meeting	14,383	13,320	+8.0%	13.9 sq mi (36.00 km^{2})	13.7 sq mi (35.48 km^{2})	1729
Nantucket	Town	Nantucket (seat)	Open town meeting	14,255	10,172	+40.1%	105.3 sq mi (272.73 km^{2})	47.8 sq mi (123.80 km^{2})	1671
Uxbridge	Town	Worcester	Open town meeting	14,162	13,457	+5.2%	30.4 sq mi (78.74 km^{2})	29.5 sq mi (76.40 km^{2})	1727
Wayland	Town	Middlesex	Open town meeting	13,943	13,444	+3.7%	15.9 sq mi (41.18 km^{2})	15.2 sq mi (39.37 km^{2})	1780
Millbury	Town	Worcester	Open town meeting	13,831	13,261	+4.3%	16.3 sq mi (42.22 km^{2})	15.7 sq mi (40.66 km^{2})	1813
Ipswich	Town	Essex	Open town meeting	13,785	13,175	+4.6%	42.5 sq mi (110.07 km^{2})	32.1 sq mi (83.14 km^{2})	1634
Kingston	Town	Plymouth	Open town meeting	13,708	12,629	+8.5%	20.5 sq mi (53.09 km^{2})	18.6 sq mi (48.17 km^{2})	1726
Harwich	Town	Barnstable	Open town meeting	13,440	12,243	+9.8%	33.1 sq mi (85.73 km^{2})	20.9 sq mi (54.13 km^{2})	1694
Oxford	Town	Worcester	Open town meeting	13,347	13,709	−2.6%	27.5 sq mi (71.22 km^{2})	26.6 sq mi (68.89 km^{2})	1713
Charlton	Town	Worcester	Open town meeting	13,315	12,981	+2.6%	43.8 sq mi (113.44 km^{2})	42.5 sq mi (110.07 km^{2})	1755
Medway	Town	Norfolk	Open town meeting	13,115	12,752	+2.8%	11.5 sq mi (29.78 km^{2})	11.5 sq mi (29.78 km^{2})	1713
Lynnfield	Town	Essex	Open town meeting	13,000	11,596	+12.1%	10.5 sq mi (27.19 km^{2})	9.9 sq mi (25.64 km^{2})	1814
North Adams	City	Berkshire	Mayor-Council	12,961	13,708	−5.4%	20.6 sq mi (53.35 km^{2})	20.4 sq mi (52.84 km^{2})	1878
Medfield	Town	Norfolk	Open town meeting	12,799	12,024	+6.4%	14.6 sq mi (37.81 km^{2})	14.5 sq mi (37.55 km^{2})	1651
Rehoboth	Town	Bristol	Open town meeting	12,502	11,608	+7.7%	46.8 sq mi (121.21 km^{2})	46.5 sq mi (120.43 km^{2})	1645
Palmer	City	Hampden	Manager-Council	12,448	12,140	+2.5%	32.0 sq mi (82.88 km^{2})	31.6 sq mi (81.84 km^{2})	1775
Tyngsborough	Town	Middlesex	Open town meeting	12,380	11,292	+9.6%	18.1 sq mi (46.88 km^{2})	16.9 sq mi (43.77 km^{2})	1809
Wrentham	Town	Norfolk	Open town meeting	12,178	10,955	+11.2%	22.9 sq mi (59.31 km^{2})	22.2 sq mi (57.50 km^{2})	1673
Spencer	Town	Worcester	Open town meeting	11,992	11,688	+2.6%	34.1 sq mi (88.32 km^{2})	32.9 sq mi (85.21 km^{2})	1775
Athol	Town	Worcester	Open town meeting	11,945	11,584	+3.1%	33.4 sq mi (86.51 km^{2})	32.6 sq mi (84.43 km^{2})	1762
Dudley	Town	Worcester	Open town meeting	11,921	11,390	+4.7%	22.1 sq mi (57.24 km^{2})	21.1 sq mi (54.65 km^{2})	1732
Weston	Town	Middlesex	Open town meeting	11,851	11,261	+5.2%	17.3 sq mi (44.81 km^{2})	17.0 sq mi (44.03 km^{2})	1713
Lunenburg	Town	Worcester	Open town meeting	11,782	10,086	+16.8%	27.7 sq mi (71.74 km^{2})	26.4 sq mi (68.38 km^{2})	1728
Norfolk	Town	Norfolk	Open town meeting	11,662	11,227	+3.9%	15.2 sq mi (39.37 km^{2})	14.8 sq mi (38.33 km^{2})	1870
Carver	Town	Plymouth	Open town meeting	11,645	11,509	+1.2%	39.7 sq mi (102.82 km^{2})	37.4 sq mi (96.87 km^{2})	1790
Pepperell	Town	Middlesex	Open town meeting	11,604	11,497	+0.9%	23.2 sq mi (60.09 km^{2})	22.6 sq mi (58.53 km^{2})	1775
Lakeville	Town	Plymouth	Open town meeting	11,523	10,602	+8.7%	36.1 sq mi (93.50 km^{2})	29.6 sq mi (76.66 km^{2})	1853
Holbrook	Town	Norfolk	Representative town meeting	11,405	10,791	+5.7%	7.4 sq mi (19.17 km^{2})	7.4 sq mi (19.17 km^{2})	1872
Norwell	Town	Plymouth	Open town meeting	11,351	10,506	+8.0%	21.2 sq mi (54.91 km^{2})	20.9 sq mi (54.13 km^{2})	1849
Groton	Town	Middlesex	Open town meeting	11,315	10,646	+6.3%	33.7 sq mi (87.28 km^{2})	32.8 sq mi (84.95 km^{2})	1655
Leicester	Town	Worcester	Open town meeting	11,087	10,970	+1.1%	24.7 sq mi (63.97 km^{2})	23.4 sq mi (60.61 km^{2})	1714
Maynard	Town	Middlesex	Open town meeting	10,746	10,106	+6.3%	5.4 sq mi (13.99 km^{2})	5.2 sq mi (13.47 km^{2})	1871
Hanson	Town	Plymouth	Open town meeting	10,639	10,209	+4.2%	15.7 sq mi (40.66 km^{2})	15.0 sq mi (38.85 km^{2})	1820
Acushnet	Town	Bristol	Open town meeting	10,559	10,303	+2.5%	19.0 sq mi (49.21 km^{2})	18.4 sq mi (47.66 km^{2})	1860
Southborough	Town	Worcester	Open town meeting	10,450	9,767	+7.0%	15.7 sq mi (40.66 km^{2})	14.2 sq mi (36.78 km^{2})	1727
Winchendon	Town	Worcester	Open town meeting	10,364	10,300	+0.6%	44.1 sq mi (114.22 km^{2})	43.3 sq mi (112.15 km^{2})	1764
Brewster	Town	Barnstable	Open town meeting	10,318	9,820	+5.1%	25.4 sq mi (65.79 km^{2})	22.9 sq mi (59.31 km^{2})	1803
Littleton	Town	Middlesex	Open town meeting	10,141	8,924	+13.6%	17.6 sq mi (45.58 km^{2})	16.6 sq mi (42.99 km^{2})	1715
Hull	Town	Plymouth	Open town meeting	10,072	10,293	−2.1%	26.9 sq mi (69.67 km^{2})	2.8 sq mi (7.25 km^{2})	1644
Ware	Town	Hampshire	Open town meeting	10,066	9,872	+2.0%	40.0 sq mi (103.60 km^{2})	34.4 sq mi (89.10 km^{2})	1775
Plainville	Town	Norfolk	Open town meeting	9,945	8,264	+20.3%	11.5 sq mi (29.78 km^{2})	11.0 sq mi (28.49 km^{2})	1905
Sturbridge	Town	Worcester	Open town meeting	9,867	9,268	+6.5%	39.0 sq mi (101.01 km^{2})	37.4 sq mi (96.87 km^{2})	1738
Middleton	Town	Essex	Open town meeting	9,779	8,987	+8.8%	14.5 sq mi (37.55 km^{2})	14.0 sq mi (36.26 km^{2})	1728
Sutton	Town	Worcester	Open town meeting	9,357	8,963	+4.4%	33.9 sq mi (87.80 km^{2})	32.4 sq mi (83.92 km^{2})	1714
Salisbury	Town	Essex	Open town meeting	9,236	8,283	+11.5%	17.9 sq mi (46.36 km^{2})	15.4 sq mi (39.89 km^{2})	1639
Southwick	Town	Hampden	Open town meeting	9,232	9,502	−2.8%	31.7 sq mi (82.10 km^{2})	30.8 sq mi (79.77 km^{2})	1775
Blackstone	Town	Worcester	Open town meeting	9,208	9,026	+2.0%	11.2 sq mi (29.01 km^{2})	10.9 sq mi (28.23 km^{2})	1845
Freetown	Town	Bristol	Open town meeting	9,206	8,870	+3.8%	38.3 sq mi (99.20 km^{2})	36.6 sq mi (94.79 km^{2})	1683
Townsend	Town	Middlesex	Open town meeting	9,127	8,926	+2.3%	33.1 sq mi (85.73 km^{2})	32.9 sq mi (85.21 km^{2})	1732
Rutland	Town	Worcester	Open town meeting	9,049	7,973	+13.5%	36.4 sq mi (94.28 km^{2})	35.3 sq mi (91.43 km^{2})	1713
Douglas	Town	Worcester	Open town meeting	8,983	8,471	+6.0%	37.7 sq mi (97.64 km^{2})	36.4 sq mi (94.28 km^{2})	1775
Montague	Town	Franklin	Representative town meeting	8,580	8,437	+1.7%	31.5 sq mi (81.58 km^{2})	30.2 sq mi (78.22 km^{2})	1775
Ayer	Town	Middlesex	Open town meeting	8,479	7,427	+14.2%	9.6 sq mi (24.86 km^{2})	9.0 sq mi (23.31 km^{2})	1871
Georgetown	Town	Essex	Open town meeting	8,470	8,183	+3.5%	13.2 sq mi (34.19 km^{2})	12.9 sq mi (33.41 km^{2})	1838
Millis	Town	Norfolk	Open town meeting	8,460	7,891	+7.2%	12.3 sq mi (31.86 km^{2})	12.2 sq mi (31.60 km^{2})	1885
Lancaster	Town	Worcester	Open town meeting	8,441	8,055	+4.8%	28.2 sq mi (73.04 km^{2})	27.7 sq mi (71.74 km^{2})	1653
Cohasset	Town	Norfolk	Open town meeting	8,381	7,542	+11.1%	31.4 sq mi (81.33 km^{2})	9.8 sq mi (25.38 km^{2})	1775
Westminster	Town	Worcester	Open town meeting	8,213			37.3 sq mi (96.61 km^{2})	35.3 sq mi (91.43 km^{2})	1770
Boxford	Town	Essex	Open town meeting	8,203			24.4 sq mi (63.20 km^{2})	23.6 sq mi (61.12 km^{2})	1685
Adams	Town	Berkshire	Representative town meeting	8,166			23.0 sq mi (59.57 km^{2})	22.9 sq mi (59.31 km^{2})	1778
Monson	Town	Hampden	Open town meeting	8,150			44.8 sq mi (116.03 km^{2})	44.1 sq mi (114.22 km^{2})	1775
Templeton	Town	Worcester	Open town meeting	8,149			32.4 sq mi (83.92 km^{2})	32.0 sq mi (82.88 km^{2})	1762
Dighton	Town	Bristol	Open town meeting	8,101			22.6 sq mi (58.53 km^{2})	22.0 sq mi (56.98 km^{2})	1712
Upton	Town	Worcester	Open town meeting	8,000			21.7 sq mi (56.20 km^{2})	21.5 sq mi (55.68 km^{2})	1735
Sterling	Town	Worcester	Open town meeting	7,985			31.6 sq mi (81.84 km^{2})	30.5 sq mi (78.99 km^{2})	1781
West Boylston	Town	Worcester	Open town meeting	7,877			13.8 sq mi (35.74 km^{2})	12.9 sq mi (33.41 km^{2})	1808
Halifax	Town	Plymouth	Open town meeting	7,749			17.3 sq mi (44.81 km^{2})	16.2 sq mi (41.96 km^{2})	1734
West Bridgewater	Town	Plymouth	Open town meeting	7,707			15.7 sq mi (40.66 km^{2})	15.3 sq mi (39.63 km^{2})	1822
Orange	Town	Franklin	Open town meeting	7,569			36.0 sq mi (93.24 km^{2})	35.1 sq mi (90.91 km^{2})	1810
Hamilton	Town	Essex	Open town meeting	7,561			14.9 sq mi (38.59 km^{2})	14.2 sq mi (36.78 km^{2})	1793
Williamstown	Town	Berkshire	Open town meeting	7,513			46.9 sq mi (121.47 km^{2})	46.8 sq mi (121.21 km^{2})	1765
Shirley	Town	Middlesex	Open town meeting	7,431			15.9 sq mi (41.18 km^{2})	15.8 sq mi (40.92 km^{2})	1775
Stow	Town	Middlesex	Open town meeting	7,174			18.1 sq mi (46.88 km^{2})	17.6 sq mi (45.58 km^{2})	1683
Great Barrington	Town	Berkshire	Open town meeting	7,172			45.8 sq mi (118.62 km^{2})	44.8 sq mi (116.03 km^{2})	1761
Lincoln	Town	Middlesex	Open town meeting	7,014			15.0 sq mi (38.85 km^{2})	14.4 sq mi (37.30 km^{2})	1754
Rockport	Town	Essex	Open town meeting	6,992			17.5 sq mi (45.32 km^{2})	7.0 sq mi (18.13 km^{2})	1840
Harvard	Town	Worcester	Open town meeting	6,851			27.0 sq mi (69.93 km^{2})	26.4 sq mi (68.38 km^{2})	1732
Berkley	Town	Bristol	Open town meeting	6,764			17.4 sq mi (45.07 km^{2})	16.5 sq mi (42.73 km^{2})	1735
Groveland	Town	Essex	Open town meeting	6,752			9.4 sq mi (24.35 km^{2})	9.0 sq mi (23.31 km^{2})	1850
Merrimac	Town	Essex	Open town meeting	6,723			8.8 sq mi (22.79 km^{2})	8.5 sq mi (22.01 km^{2})	1876
Newbury	Town	Essex	Open town meeting	6,716			26.3 sq mi (68.12 km^{2})	23.4 sq mi (60.61 km^{2})	1635
Chatham	Town	Barnstable	Open town meeting	6,594			24.4 sq mi (63.20 km^{2})	16.3 sq mi (42.22 km^{2})	1712
Topsfield	Town	Essex	Open town meeting	6,569			12.8 sq mi (33.15 km^{2})	11.9 sq mi (30.82 km^{2})	1650
Mattapoisett	Town	Plymouth	Open town meeting	6,508			24.2 sq mi (62.68 km^{2})	17.4 sq mi (45.07 km^{2})	1857
Dalton	Town	Berkshire	Open town meeting	6,330			21.9 sq mi (56.72 km^{2})	21.8 sq mi (56.46 km^{2})	1784
Ashburnham	Town	Worcester	Open town meeting	6,315			41.0 sq mi (106.19 km^{2})	38.7 sq mi (100.23 km^{2})	1765
Orleans	Town	Barnstable	Open town meeting	6,307			22.7 sq mi (58.79 km^{2})	14.1 sq mi (36.52 km^{2})	1797
Mendon	Town	Worcester	Open town meeting	6,228			18.3 sq mi (47.40 km^{2})	18.1 sq mi (46.88 km^{2})	1667
Southampton	Town	Hampshire	Open town meeting	6,224			29.1 sq mi (75.37 km^{2})	28.2 sq mi (73.04 km^{2})	1775
Rowley	Town	Essex	Open town meeting	6,161			20.3 sq mi (52.58 km^{2})	18.2 sq mi (47.14 km^{2})	1639
Granby	Town	Hampshire	Open town meeting	6,110			28.1 sq mi (72.78 km^{2})	27.8 sq mi (72.00 km^{2})	1768
Hopedale	Town	Worcester	Open town meeting	6,017			5.3 sq mi (13.73 km^{2})	5.2 sq mi (13.47 km^{2})	1886
Dover	Town	Norfolk	Open town meeting	5,923			15.4 sq mi (39.89 km^{2})	15.3 sq mi (39.63 km^{2})	1836
Lee	Town	Berkshire	Open town meeting	5,788			27.0 sq mi (69.93 km^{2})	26.1 sq mi (67.60 km^{2})	1777
Eastham	Town	Barnstable	Open town meeting	5,752			25.7 sq mi (66.56 km^{2})	14.0 sq mi (36.26 km^{2})	1646
Rochester	Town	Plymouth	Open town meeting	5,717			36.4 sq mi (94.28 km^{2})	33.9 sq mi (87.80 km^{2})	1686
Bolton	Town	Worcester	Open town meeting	5,665			20.0 sq mi (51.80 km^{2})	19.9 sq mi (51.54 km^{2})	1738
Barre	Town	Worcester	Open town meeting	5,530			44.6 sq mi (115.51 km^{2})	44.3 sq mi (114.74 km^{2})	1774
Boxborough	Town	Middlesex	Open town meeting	5,506			10.4 sq mi (26.94 km^{2})	10.4 sq mi (26.94 km^{2})	1835
Manchester-by-the-Sea	Town	Essex	Open town meeting	5,395			18.3 sq mi (47.40 km^{2})	9.2 sq mi (23.83 km^{2})	1645
Marion	Town	Plymouth	Open town meeting	5,347			26.1 sq mi (67.60 km^{2})	12.1 sq mi (31.34 km^{2})	1852
Oak Bluffs	Town	Dukes	Open town meeting	5,341			26.0 sq mi (67.34 km^{2})	7.4 sq mi (19.17 km^{2})	1880
Hadley	Town	Hampshire	Open town meeting	5,325			24.6 sq mi (63.71 km^{2})	23.1 sq mi (59.83 km^{2})	1661
Carlisle	Town	Middlesex	Open town meeting	5,237			15.6 sq mi (40.40 km^{2})	15.4 sq mi (39.89 km^{2})	1780
Edgartown	Town	Dukes (seat)	Open town meeting	5,168			122.7 sq mi (317.79 km^{2})	27 sq mi (69.93 km^{2})	1671
Lenox	Town	Berkshire	Open town meeting	5,095			21.7 sq mi (56.20 km^{2})	21.2 sq mi (54.91 km^{2})	1775
Deerfield	Town	Franklin	Open town meeting	5,090			33.4 sq mi (86.51 km^{2})	32.4 sq mi (83.92 km^{2})	1677
Paxton	Town	Worcester	Open town meeting	5,004			15.5 sq mi (40.14 km^{2})	14.7 sq mi (38.07 km^{2})	1775
Wenham	Town	Essex	Open town meeting	4,979			8.1 sq mi (20.98 km^{2})	7.6 sq mi (19.68 km^{2})	1643
Warren	Town	Worcester	Open town meeting	4,975			27.6 sq mi (71.48 km^{2})	27.5 sq mi (71.22 km^{2})	1742
Hampden	Town	Hampden	Open town meeting	4,966			19.7 sq mi (51.02 km^{2})	19.6 sq mi (50.76 km^{2})	1878
Boylston	Town	Worcester	Open town meeting	4,849			19.7 sq mi (51.02 km^{2})	16.0 sq mi (41.44 km^{2})	1785
Tisbury	Town	Dukes	Open town meeting	4,815			19.1 sq mi (49.47 km^{2})	6.5 sq mi (16.83 km^{2})	1671
Avon	Town	Norfolk	Open town meeting	4,777			4.6 sq mi (11.91 km^{2})	4.4 sq mi (11.40 km^{2})	1888
North Brookfield	Town	Worcester	Open town meeting	4,735			21.7 sq mi (56.20 km^{2})	21.1 sq mi (54.65 km^{2})	1812
West Newbury	Town	Essex	Open town meeting	4,500			14.7 sq mi (38.07 km^{2})	13.4 sq mi (34.71 km^{2})	1819
Sherborn	Town	Middlesex	Open town meeting	4,401			16.2 sq mi (41.96 km^{2})	16.0 sq mi (41.44 km^{2})	1674
Hubbardston	Town	Worcester	Open town meeting	4,328			42.0 sq mi (108.78 km^{2})	41.0 sq mi (106.19 km^{2})	1775
West Brookfield	Town	Worcester	Open town meeting	3,833			21.1 sq mi (54.65 km^{2})	20.5 sq mi (53.09 km^{2})	1848
Brimfield	Town	Hampden	Open town meeting	3,694			35.2 sq mi (91.17 km^{2})	34.7 sq mi (89.87 km^{2})	1731
Essex	Town	Essex	Open town meeting	3,675			15.9 sq mi (41.18 km^{2})	14 sq mi (36.26 km^{2})	1819
Provincetown	Town	Barnstable	Open town meeting	3,664			17.5 sq mi (45.32 km^{2})	9.7 sq mi (25.12 km^{2})	1727
Sunderland	Town	Franklin	Open town meeting	3,663			14.7 sq mi (38.07 km^{2})	14.2 sq mi (36.78 km^{2})	1714
Wellfleet	Town	Barnstable	Open town meeting	3,566			35.4 sq mi (91.69 km^{2})	19.8 sq mi (51.28 km^{2})	1775
West Tisbury	Town	Dukes	Open town meeting	3,555			41.8 sq mi (108.26 km^{2})	25.0 sq mi (64.75 km^{2})	1892
Princeton	Town	Worcester	Open town meeting	3,495			35.8 sq mi (92.72 km^{2})	35.4 sq mi (91.69 km^{2})	1771
Brookfield	Town	Worcester	Open town meeting	3,439			16.6 sq mi (42.99 km^{2})	15.5 sq mi (40.14 km^{2})	1718
Dunstable	Town	Middlesex	Open town meeting	3,358			16.7 sq mi (43.25 km^{2})	16.6 sq mi (42.99 km^{2})	1673
Hatfield	Town	Hampshire	Open town meeting	3,352			16.8 sq mi (43.51 km^{2})	15.9 sq mi (41.18 km^{2})	1670
Nahant	Town	Essex	Open town meeting	3,334			15.5 sq mi (40.14 km^{2})	1.0 sq mi (2.59 km^{2})	1853
Sheffield	Town	Berkshire	Open town meeting	3,327			48.6 sq mi (125.87 km^{2})	47.5 sq mi (123.02 km^{2})	1733
Cheshire	Town	Berkshire	Open town meeting	3,258			27.5 sq mi (71.22 km^{2})	26.8 sq mi (69.41 km^{2})	1793
Ashby	Town	Middlesex	Open town meeting	3,193			24.2 sq mi (62.68 km^{2})	23.8 sq mi (61.64 km^{2})	1767
Millville	Town	Worcester	Open town meeting	3,174			5.0 sq mi (12.95 km^{2})	4.9 sq mi (12.69 km^{2})	1916
Berlin	Town	Worcester	Open town meeting	3,158			13.1 sq mi (33.93 km^{2})	12.9 sq mi (33.41 km^{2})	1812
Lanesborough	Town	Berkshire	Open town meeting	3,038			29.6 sq mi (76.66 km^{2})	28.8 sq mi (74.59 km^{2})	1765
Plympton	Town	Plymouth	Open town meeting	2,930			15.1 sq mi (39.11 km^{2})	14.8 sq mi (38.33 km^{2})	1707
Northfield	Town	Franklin	Open town meeting	2,866			35.4 sq mi (91.69 km^{2})	34.3 sq mi (88.84 km^{2})	1723
Hardwick	Town	Worcester	Open town meeting	2,667			40.8 sq mi (105.67 km^{2})	38.6 sq mi (99.97 km^{2})	1739
Holland	Town	Hampden	Open town meeting	2,603			13.1 sq mi (33.93 km^{2})	12.3 sq mi (31.86 km^{2})	1835
Williamsburg	Town	Hampshire	Open town meeting	2,504			25.7 sq mi (66.56 km^{2})	25.6 sq mi (66.30 km^{2})	1775
Truro	Town	Barnstable	Open town meeting	2,454			26.3 sq mi (68.12 km^{2})	21.1 sq mi (54.65 km^{2})	1709
East Brookfield	Town	Worcester	Open town meeting	2,224			10.4 sq mi (26.94 km^{2})	9.8 sq mi (25.38 km^{2})	1920
Bernardston	Town	Franklin	Open town meeting	2,102			23.4 sq mi (60.61 km^{2})	23.4 sq mi (60.61 km^{2})	1762
Huntington	Town	Hampshire	Open town meeting	2,094			26.8 sq mi (69.41 km^{2})	26.3 sq mi (68.12 km^{2})	1775
Stockbridge	Town	Berkshire	Open town meeting	2,018			23.7 sq mi (61.38 km^{2})	22.7 sq mi (58.79 km^{2})	1739
Becket	Town	Berkshire	Open town meeting	1,931			47.8 sq mi (123.80 km^{2})	46.1 sq mi (119.40 km^{2})	1765
Hinsdale	Town	Berkshire	Open town meeting	1,919			21.7 sq mi (56.20 km^{2})	20.7 sq mi (53.61 km^{2})	1804
Shelburne	Town	Franklin	Open town meeting	1,884			23.4 sq mi (60.61 km^{2})	23.2 sq mi (60.09 km^{2})	1775
Leverett	Town	Franklin	Open town meeting	1,865			23.0 sq mi (59.57 km^{2})	22.9 sq mi (59.31 km^{2})	1774
Oakham	Town	Worcester	Open town meeting	1,851			21.5 sq mi (55.68 km^{2})	21.1 sq mi (54.65 km^{2})	1775
Wales	Town	Hampden	Open town meeting	1,832			15.9 sq mi (41.18 km^{2})	15.7 sq mi (40.66 km^{2})	1762
Buckland	Town	Franklin	Open town meeting	1,816			19.9 sq mi (51.54 km^{2})	19.7 sq mi (51.02 km^{2})	1779
Conway	Town	Franklin	Open town meeting	1,761			37.9 sq mi (98.16 km^{2})	37.7 sq mi (97.64 km^{2})	1775
Phillipston	Town	Worcester	Open town meeting	1,726			24.6 sq mi (63.71 km^{2})	24.3 sq mi (62.94 km^{2})	1786
Shutesbury	Town	Franklin	Open town meeting	1,717			27.2 sq mi (70.45 km^{2})	26.6 sq mi (68.89 km^{2})	1761
Ashfield	Town	Franklin	Open town meeting	1,695			40.3 sq mi (104.38 km^{2})	40.0 sq mi (103.60 km^{2})	1765
Erving	Town	Franklin	Open town meeting	1,665			14.4 sq mi (37.30 km^{2})	13.9 sq mi (36.00 km^{2})	1838
Clarksburg	Town	Berkshire	Open town meeting	1,657			12.8 sq mi (33.15 km^{2})	12.8 sq mi (33.15 km^{2})	1798
Russell	Town	Hampden	Open town meeting	1,643			17.8 sq mi (46.10 km^{2})	17.3 sq mi (44.81 km^{2})	1792
Otis	Town	Berkshire	Open town meeting	1,634			38.0 sq mi (98.42 km^{2})	35.6 sq mi (92.20 km^{2})	1773
Westhampton	Town	Hampshire	Open town meeting	1,622			27.4 sq mi (70.97 km^{2})	27.2 sq mi (70.45 km^{2})	1778
Whately	Town	Franklin	Open town meeting	1,607			20.7 sq mi (53.61 km^{2})	20.2 sq mi (52.32 km^{2})	1771
Colrain	Town	Franklin	Open town meeting	1,606			43.4 sq mi (112.41 km^{2})	43.1 sq mi (111.63 km^{2})	1761
Gill	Town	Franklin	Open town meeting	1,551			14.8 sq mi (38.33 km^{2})	13.7 sq mi (35.48 km^{2})	1793
Granville	Town	Hampden	Open town meeting	1,538			43.0 sq mi (111.37 km^{2})	42.2 sq mi (109.30 km^{2})	1775
New Marlborough	Town	Berkshire	Open town meeting	1,528			47.9 sq mi (124.06 km^{2})	46.9 sq mi (121.47 km^{2})	1775
Richmond	Town	Berkshire	Open town meeting	1,407			19.0 sq mi (49.21 km^{2})	18.7 sq mi (48.43 km^{2})	1765
Egremont	Town	Berkshire	Open town meeting	1,372			18.9 sq mi (48.95 km^{2})	18.7 sq mi (48.43 km^{2})	1775
West Stockbridge	Town	Berkshire	Open town meeting	1,343			18.7 sq mi (48.43 km^{2})	18.5 sq mi (47.91 km^{2})	1775
Pelham	Town	Hampshire	Open town meeting	1,280			26.5 sq mi (68.63 km^{2})	25.1 sq mi (65.01 km^{2})	1743
Royalston	Town	Worcester	Open town meeting	1,250			42.5 sq mi (110.07 km^{2})	41.9 sq mi (108.52 km^{2})	1765
Chester	Town	Hampden	Open town meeting	1,228			37.2 sq mi (96.35 km^{2})	36.6 sq mi (94.79 km^{2})	1765
Blandford	Town	Hampden	Open town meeting	1,215			53.4 sq mi (138.31 km^{2})	51.6 sq mi (133.64 km^{2})	1741
Chilmark	Town	Dukes	Open town meeting	1,212			100.4 sq mi (260.03 km^{2})	19 sq mi (49.21 km^{2})	1714
Petersham	Town	Worcester	Open town meeting	1,194			68.3 sq mi (176.90 km^{2})	54.2 sq mi (140.38 km^{2})	1754
Worthington	Town	Hampshire	Open town meeting	1,193			32.1 sq mi (83.14 km^{2})	31.9 sq mi (82.62 km^{2})	1768
Chesterfield	Town	Hampshire	Open town meeting	1,186			31.2 sq mi (80.81 km^{2})	30.8 sq mi (79.77 km^{2})	1762
Charlemont	Town	Franklin	Open town meeting	1,185			26.4 sq mi (68.38 km^{2})	25.9 sq mi (67.08 km^{2})	1765
Monterey	Town	Berkshire	Open town meeting	1,095			27.4 sq mi (70.97 km^{2})	26.4 sq mi (68.38 km^{2})	1847
New Braintree	Town	Worcester	Open town meeting	996			20.9 sq mi (54.13 km^{2})	20.7 sq mi (53.61 km^{2})	1775
Sandisfield	Town	Berkshire	Open town meeting	989	915	+8.1%	53.0 sq mi (137.27 km^{2})	51.8 sq mi (134.16 km^{2})	1762
New Salem	Town	Franklin	Open town meeting	983	990	−0.7%	58.6 sq mi (151.77 km^{2})	44.8 sq mi (116.03 km^{2})	1775
Goshen	Town	Hampshire	Open town meeting	960	1,054	−8.9%	17.7 sq mi (45.84 km^{2})	17.4 sq mi (45.07 km^{2})	1781
Wendell	Town	Franklin	Open town meeting	924	848	+9.0%	32.2 sq mi (83.40 km^{2})	31.9 sq mi (82.62 km^{2})	1781
Windsor	Town	Berkshire	Open town meeting	834	899	−7.2%	35.2 sq mi (91.17 km^{2})	35.0 sq mi (90.65 km^{2})	1771
Cummington	Town	Hampshire	Open town meeting	829	872	−4.9%	23.1 sq mi (59.83 km^{2})	22.9 sq mi (59.31 km^{2})	1779
Montgomery	Town	Hampden	Open town meeting	819	838	−2.3%	15.2 sq mi (39.37 km^{2})	15.1 sq mi (39.11 km^{2})	1780
Peru	Town	Berkshire	Open town meeting	814	847	−3.9%	26.0 sq mi (67.34 km^{2})	25.9 sq mi (67.08 km^{2})	1771
Warwick	Town	Franklin	Open town meeting	780	780	0.0%	37.6 sq mi (97.38 km^{2})	37.3 sq mi (96.61 km^{2})	1763
Hancock	Town	Berkshire	Open town meeting	757	717	+5.6%	35.8 sq mi (92.72 km^{2})	35.7 sq mi (92.46 km^{2})	1776
Leyden	Town	Franklin	Open town meeting	734	711	+3.2%	18.0 sq mi (46.62 km^{2})	17.9 sq mi (46.36 km^{2})	1809
Heath	Town	Franklin	Open town meeting	723	706	+2.4%	24.9 sq mi (64.49 km^{2})	24.9 sq mi (64.49 km^{2})	1785
Florida	Town	Berkshire	Open town meeting	694	752	−7.7%	24.6 sq mi (63.71 km^{2})	24.4 sq mi (63.20 km^{2})	1805
Savoy	Town	Berkshire	Open town meeting	645	692	−6.8%	36.0 sq mi (93.24 km^{2})	35.8 sq mi (92.72 km^{2})	1797
Plainfield	Town	Hampshire	Open town meeting	633	648	−2.3%	21.3 sq mi (55.17 km^{2})	21.1 sq mi (54.65 km^{2})	1807
Washington	Town	Berkshire	Open town meeting	494	538	−8.2%	38.8 sq mi (100.49 km^{2})	38 sq mi (98.42 km^{2})	1777
Alford	Town	Berkshire	Open town meeting	486	494	−1.6%	11.5 sq mi (29.78 km^{2})	11.5 sq mi (29.78 km^{2})	1773
Tolland	Town	Hampden	Open town meeting	471	485	−2.9%	32.8 sq mi (84.95 km^{2})	31.5 sq mi (81.58 km^{2})	1810
Aquinnah	Town	Dukes	Open town meeting	439	311	+41.2%	40.8 sq mi (105.67 km^{2})	5.4 sq mi (13.99 km^{2})	1870
Tyringham	Town	Berkshire	Open town meeting	427	327	+30.6%	18.9 sq mi (48.95 km^{2})	18.6 sq mi (48.17 km^{2})	1762
Rowe	Town	Franklin	Open town meeting	424	393	+7.9%	24.0 sq mi (62.16 km^{2})	23.4 sq mi (60.61 km^{2})	1785
Middlefield	Town	Hampshire	Open town meeting	385	521	−26.1%	24.2 sq mi (62.68 km^{2})	24.2 sq mi (62.68 km^{2})	1783
Hawley	Town	Franklin	Open town meeting	353	337	+4.7%	30.9 sq mi (80.03 km^{2})	30.9 sq mi (80.03 km^{2})	1792
New Ashford	Town	Berkshire	Open town meeting	250	228	+9.6%	13.5 sq mi (34.96 km^{2})	13.4 sq mi (34.71 km^{2})	1835
Mount Washington	Town	Berkshire	Open town meeting	160	167	−4.2%	22.4 sq mi (58.02 km^{2})	22.2 sq mi (57.50 km^{2})	1779
Monroe	Town	Franklin	Open town meeting	118	121	−2.5%	10.8 sq mi (27.97 km^{2})	10.7 sq mi (27.71 km^{2})	1822
Gosnold	Town	Dukes	Open town meeting	70	75	−6.7%	140.2 sq mi (363.12 km^{2})	13.2 sq mi (34.19 km^{2})	1864

== Geography of towns at formation ==
Many municipalities have at some point been divided into two or more smaller municipalities. For example, Dorchester was incorporated in 1630 and originally included all of the current Dorchester, now the largest neighborhood of Boston, plus the Boston neighborhood of Mattapan, and all of present-day Quincy, Milton, Braintree, Randolph, Holbrook, Canton, Sharon, Stoughton, Avon and the northeast portion of Foxboro. Nearly all of Massachusetts territory had been incorporated by 1815, with the final three areas of Erving (1838), Gay Head (now Aquinnah) and Mashpee (both 1870) being incorporated from previously Native American land.

Community	Year incorporated as a town	Notes
Medfield	1651	The first town to leave Dedham.
Natick	1659	Established as a community for Christian Indians.
Wrentham	1673	Southeast corner of town was part of the Dorchester New Grant of 1637.
Deerfield	1673	Land was granted to Dedham in return for giving up Natick.
Needham	1711	
Medway	1713	Separated from Medfield. The land was granted to Dedham in 1649.
Bellingham	1719	
Walpole	1724	
Stoughton	1726	Part of the Dorchester New Grant of 1637. Separated from Dorchester.
Sharon	1775	Part of the Dorchester New Grant of 1637. Separated from Stoughton.
Foxborough	1778	Part of the Dorchester New Grant of 1637.
Franklin	1778	Separated from Wrentham.
Canton	1797	Part of the Dorchester New Grant of 1637. Separated from Stoughton.
Dover	1836	Then known as Springfield, it became a precinct of Dedham by vote of Town Meeting in 1729; relegated to a parish the same year by the General Court. Created the Fourth Precinct by the General Court in 1748.
Hyde Park	1868	800 acres taken from Dedham, along with land from Dorchester and Milton.
Norfolk	1870	Separated from Wrentham.
Norwood	1872	Created a precinct with Clapboard Trees (Westwood) in 1729. Became its own precinct in 1734.
Wellesley	1881	Separated from Needham
Millis	1885	Separated from Medway.
Avon	1888	Part of the Dorchester New Grant of 1637. Separated from Stoughton.
Westwood	1897	Joined with South Dedham (Norwood) to create Second Precinct in 1729. Returned to First Precinct in 1734. In 1737 became Third Precinct. Last community to break away directly from Dedham.
Plainville	1905	Eastern section of town was part of the Dorchester New Grant of 1637. Separated from Wrentham.

== Former municipalities ==
Some towns and cities were annexed to others; disincorporated; or ceded to another state in their entirety. This list does not include territory changes affecting only part of a municipality; see History of Massachusetts.

=== Annexations ===
The following formerly independent municipalities have been annexed to Boston:

- Brighton (1873)
- Charlestown (1873)
- Dorchester (1869)
- Hyde Park (1912)
- Roxbury (1867)
- West Roxbury (1873)

The town of Bradford was annexed to Haverhill, Massachusetts in 1897.

=== Disincorporations ===
The following towns were disincorporated in 1938 due to the construction of the Quabbin Reservoir; all their territory was absorbed into surrounding towns:

- Dana
- Enfield
- Greenwich
- Prescott

=== Cessions ===
==== Ceded to New Hampshire ====
Due to general lack of colonial government there, all four towns in colonial New Hampshire chose to become part of the Massachusetts Bay Colony in 1641. They were ceded to the re-formed Province of New Hampshire in 1680, under a newly issued royal charter:

- Dover
- Exeter
- Hampton
- Portsmouth

Numerous towns were ceded to New Hampshire after the Northern boundary of Massachusetts was defined by royal decree in 1741:

- Dunstable North
- Naticook
- Nottingham

Those towns were later disincorporated and reincorporated under New Hampshire laws on the same day in 1746.

==== Ceded to Rhode Island ====
The following towns were ceded to the Rhode Island colony in 1747 as part of a border dispute:

- Barrington
- Bristol
- Little Compton
- Sowams (Warren)
- Tiverton

==== Ceded to Connecticut ====
Due to a 1642 surveying error and long-running political disputes, the following Massachusetts towns joined the Connecticut Colony in late 1749:

- Enfield
- Somers
- Suffield
- Woodstock

==== Ceded to Maine ====
All settlements in the District of Maine were ceded when the State of Maine gained its independence from Massachusetts in 1820 as part of the Missouri Compromise:

- Addison
- Alfred
- Alna
- Anson
- Arundel (Kennebunkport)
- Athens
- Augusta
- Avon
- Baldwin
- Bath
- Belfast
- Belgrade
- Belmont
- Berwick
- Bethel
- Biddeford
- Bingham
- Blue Hill
- Boothbay
- Bowdoin
- Bowdoinham
- Bradford
- Brewer
- Bridgton
- Bristol
- Brooks
- Brooksville
- Brownfield
- Brunswick
- Buckfield
- Bucksport
- Buxton
- Calais
- Camden
- Canaan
- Cape Elizabeth
- Carmel
- Castine
- Cherryfield
- Chesterville
- China
- Clinton
- Columbia
- Corinna
- Corinth
- Cornish
- Cornville
- Cushing
- Deer Isle
- Denmark
- Dennysville
- Dexter
- Dixfield
- Dixmont
- Dresden
- Durham
- East Andover (Andover)
- Eastport
- Eddington
- Eden (Bar Harbor)
- Edgecomb
- Eliot
- Ellsworth
- Embden
- Etna
- Exeter
- Fairfax (Albion)
- Fairfield
- Falmouth
- Farmington
- Fayette
- Frankfort
- Freedom
- Freeport
- Friendship
- Fryeburg
- Gardiner
- Garland
- Georgetown
- Gilead
- Gorham
- Gouldsboro
- Gray
- Greene
- Greenwood
- Guilford
- Hallowell
- Hampden
- Harmony
- Harpswell
- Harrington
- Harrison
- Hartford
- Hartland
- Hebron
- Hermon
- Hiram
- Hollis
- Hope
- Industry
- Islesboro
- Jackson
- Jay
- Jefferson
- Jonesboro
- Kenduskeag Plantation (Bangor)
- Kingfield
- Kittery
- Knox
- Lebanon
- Leeds
- Levant
- Lewistown (Lewiston)
- Limerick
- Limington
- Lincolnville
- Lisbon
- Litchfield
- Livermore
- Lovell
- Lubec
- Lyman
- Machias
- Madison
- Malta (Windsor)
- Mercer
- Mexico
- Minot
- Monmouth
- Monroe
- Montville
- Moscow
- Mount Desert
- Mount Vernon
- New Charleston (Charleston)
- New Gloucester
- New Portland
- New Sharon
- New Vineyard
- Newburgh
- Newcastle
- Newfield
- Newport
- Newry
- Nobleboro
- Norridgewock
- North Hill (Brighton Plantation)
- North Yarmouth
- Northport
- Norway
- Orland
- Orono
- Orrington
- Otisfield
- Palermo
- Palmyra
- Paris
- Parsonsfield
- Penobscot
- Perry
- Phillips
- Phippsburg
- Pittston
- Poland
- Porter
- Portland
- Pownal
- Prospect
- Raymond
- Readfield
- Ripley
- Robbinston
- Rome
- Rumford
- Saco
- Sanford
- Sangerville
- Scarborough
- Searsmont
- Sebec
- Sedgwick
- Shapleigh
- Sidney
- Solon
- South Berwick
- St. Albans
- St. George
- Standish
- Starks
- Steuben
- Strong
- Sullivan
- Sumner
- Surry
- Swanville
- Sweden
- Temple
- Thomaston
- Thorndike
- Topsham
- Trenton
- Troy
- Turner
- Union
- Unity
- Vassalboro
- Vienna
- Vinalhaven
- Waldoboro
- Wales
- Warren
- Warsaw (Pittsfield)
- Washington
- Waterboro
- Waterford
- Waterville
- Wayne
- Weld
- Wells
- Westbrook
- Whitefield
- Wilton
- Windham
- Winslow
- Winthrop
- Wiscasset
- Woodstock
- Woolwich
- York

== Archaic names ==
Many municipalities have changed names.

Old name	Modern name	County	Notes
Acushena	Dartmouth	Bristol	
Agawam	Dartmouth	Bristol	Different from Agawam in Hampden County
Agawam Plantation	Springfield	Hampden	An Agawam separated from Springfield via West Springfield
Andrewstown	Chesterfield	Hampshire	
Apponegansett	Dartmouth	Bristol	
Ashuelot Equivalent	Dalton	Berkshire	
Attleborough	Attleboro	Bristol	The -ugh was dropped when the city was re-incorporated in 1914
Barnardstone's Grant	Florida	Berkshire	
Basse River	Beverly	Essex	
Belcher's Town	Belchertown	Hampshire	
Berkshire Equivalent	Florida	Berkshire	
Billirikey	Billerica	Middlesex	
Blue Hill Lands	Braintree	Norfolk	
Boggestow	Sherborn	Middlesex	
Boston Township Number One	Charlemont	Franklin	
Boston Township Number Two	Colrain	Franklin	
Bullock's Grant	Florida	Berkshire	
Bullocks Grant	Clarksburg	Berkshire	
Cabotville	Chicopee	Hampden	
Cambridge Farms	Lexington	Middlesex	
Cambridge South Parish	Brighton	Suffolk	
Cape Ann	Gloucester	Essex	Different from the modern definition of Cape Ann, which includes Gloucester, Essex, Manchester-by-the-Sea, and Rockport
Chabakongomum	Dudley	Worcester	
Chabanagungamug	Dudley	Worcester	
Chappequiddick	Edgartown	Dukes	
Charley Mount	Charlemont	Franklin	
Charlton	Charlestown	Suffolk	
Chebacco	Essex	Essex	
Chequocket	Barnstable	Barnstable	
Chuckomug	Barnstable	Barnstable	
Coa	Barnstable	Barnstable	
Cochickawick	Andover	Essex	
Cochituit	Andover	Essex	
Cokachoise	Barnstable	Barnstable	
Cold Spring	Belchertown	Hampshire	
Colechester	Salisbury	Essex	
Conahasset	Cohasset	Norfolk	
Concord Village	Acton	Middlesex	
Contentment	Dedham	Norfolk	
Cotachesett	Barnstable	Barnstable	
Cottage City	Oak Bluffs	Dukes	
Danforth's Farms	Framingham	Middlesex	
District of Carlisle	Carlisle	Middlesex	
Dorchester Village	Canton	Norfolk	
Dorchester-Canada Plantation	Ashburnham	Worcester	
Ducksburrow	Duxbury	Plymouth	
Duxburrow Plantation	Bridgewater	Plymouth	
East Chelmsford	Lowell	Middlesex	
East Hoosuck Plantation	Adams	Berkshire	
East Sudbury	Wayland	Middlesex	
Edgar Towne	Edgartown	Dukes	
Emesbury	Amesbury	Essex	
Erving's Grant	Enfield	Hampshire	
Fair Haven Village	Fairhaven	Bristol	
Falls Fight	Bernardston	Franklin	
Falltown Plantation	Bernardston	Franklin	
Five Pound Island	Gloucester	Essex	
Foords Farm	Bridgewater	Plymouth	
Fort Massachusetts	Adams	Berkshire	
Freeman's Purchase	Fall River	Bristol	
Freemens Land	Freetown	Bristol	
Gageborough	Windsor	Berkshire	
Gay Head	Aquinnah	Dukes	
Gay Head Indian District	Aquinnah	Dukes	
Gerry	Phillipston	Worcester	
Glasgow	Blandford	Hampden	
Gloscester	Gloucester	Essex	
Great Harbour	Edgartown	Dukes	
Green Harbor	Duxbury	Plymouth	
Greenwich	Enfield	Hampshire	
Hack's Grant	Enfield	Hampshire	
Hawthorn	Danvers	Essex	
Hadley Third Precinct	Amherst	Hampshire	
Hockamock	Easton	Bristol	
Hockomock	Bridgewater	Plymouth	
Housatonic Township Number Four	Becket	Berkshire	
Huntstown Plantation	Ashfield	Franklin	
Hutchinson	Barre	Worcester	
Ipswich Eighth Parish	Essex	Essex	
Ireland	Holyoke	Hampden	
Iron Work Farm	Acton	Middlesex	
Ketiticut	Bridgewater	Plymouth	
Kokachoise	Barnstable	Barnstable	
Litchfield	Dunstable	Middlesex	
Little Cambridge	Brighton	Suffolk	
Little Salisbury	Amesbury	Essex	
Lyttleton	Littleton	Middlesex	
Manamoiet	Chatham	Barnstable	
Manamoit Village	Chatham	Barnstable	
Manamooskeagin	Abington	Plymouth	
Manchaug	Sutton	Worcester	
Manor of Tisbury	Chilmark	Dukes	
Mattakeeset	Barnstable	Barnstable	
Mattakeeset	Duxbury	Plymouth	
Mattapan	Dorchester	Suffolk	Section of Boston
Mennems Moone	Dorchester	Suffolk	
Menotomy	Arlington	Middlesex	
Merry Mount	Merrymount	Norfolk	Neighborhood of Quincy
Middlesex Gore	Dudley	Worcester	
Mile & Half of Land	Attleboro	Bristol	
Minnechaug	Hampden	Hampden	
Minot's Grant	Cummington	Hampshire	
Mishawum	Charlestown	Suffolk	
Mistic	Barnstable	Barnstable	
Mohootset	Carver	Plymouth	
Monatiquot	Braintree	Norfolk	
Monomoy	Chatham	Barnstable	
Monument Village	Bourne	Barnstable	
Moskeehtucketqut	Barnstable	Barnstable	
Mount Dagan	Braintree	Norfolk	
Mount Wollaston	Merrymount	Norfolk	Neighborhood of Quincy
Muddy River	Brookline	Norfolk	
Murrayfield	Chester	Hampden	
Murrayfield Grant	Cummington	Hampshire	
Musketequid	Concord	Middlesex	
Namassakeesett	Duxbury	Plymouth	
Nashowakemmuck	Chilmark	Dukes	
Nawsett	Eastham	Barnstable	
New Glasgow	Blandford	Hampden	
New Grant	Acton	Middlesex	
New Hingham Plantation	Chesterfield	Hampshire	
New Providence	Cheshire	Berkshire	
New Providence Hill	Cheshire	Berkshire	
New Providence Plantation	Adams	Berkshire	
New Providence Purchase	Cheshire	Berkshire	
New Rowley	Georgetown	Essex	
New Sherburn	Douglas	Worcester	
Newe Towne	Cambridge	Middlesex	Included modern Newton
Newtown	Cambridge	Middlesex	Included modern Newton
No Town Plantation	Buckland	Franklin	
Nobscusset	Dennis	Barnstable	
Noman's Land	Chilmark	Dukes	
Noddle's Island	Boston	Suffolk	
North Bridgewater	Brockton	Plymouth	
North Purchase	Attleboro	Bristol	
North Sandwich	Bourne	Barnstable	
North Wrentham	Norfolk	Norfolk	
Nossett	Eastham	Barnstable	
Noticock	Dunstable	Middlesex	
Nottingham	Dunstable	Middlesex	
Number Thirteen	Chelsea	Suffolk	
Nunketest	Bridgewater	Plymouth	
Nunnepog	Edgartown	Dukes	
Passacomuck	Easthampton	Hampshire	
Pawtucket	Chelmsford	Middlesex	
Pawtucket	Dracut	Middlesex	
Payquage Plantation	Athol	Worcester	
Peymechit	Barnstable	Barnstable	
Plantation Chickleystown	Charlemont	Franklin	
Plantation Number Five (1762 Township)	Cummington	Hampshire	
Plantation Number Four	Becket	Berkshire	
Plantation Number Nine (1762 Township)	Chester	Hampden	
Plantation Number One (Western Township of 1762)	Chesterfield	Hampshire	
Plantation Number One	Adams	Berkshire	
Pocomtuck	Deerfield	Franklin	
Podunke	Alford	Berkshire	
Podunkville	Alford	Berkshire	
Poguaige	Athol	Worcester	
Pompositicut	Stow	Middlesex	
Provincetown on Mills River	Athol	Worcester	
Pullen Poynte	Chelsea	Suffolk	
Pullin Point	Chelsea	Suffolk	
Punkapoag	Canton	Norfolk	
Quabaug Territory	Brookfield	Worcester	
Quabaug Territory	East Brookfield	Worcester	
Quaboag	Brookfield	Worcester	
Quequechan Region	Fall River	Bristol	
Quichickichick	Andover	Essex	
Quinsigamond	Worcester	Worcester	
Quobauge	Brookfield	Worcester	
Rowley Village	Boxford	Essex	
Rumney Marsh	Chelsea	Suffolk	
Rutland District	Barre	Worcester	
Sacconeesett	Falmouth	Barnstable	
Salem Farms	Danvers	Essex	
Salem Middle Parish	Danvers	Essex	
Salem Village Parish	Danvers	Essex	
Salisbury-new-toune	Amesbury	Essex	
Santuite	Barnstable	Barnstable	
Satucket	Brewster	Barnstable	
Satuite	Barnstable	Barnstable	
Sawkatucket	Brewster	Barnstable	
Scipuiszet	Falmouth	Barnstable	
Sconticut	Fairhaven	Bristol	
Seipuiszet	Falmouth	Barnstable	
Sepoese	Barnstable	Barnstable	
Sepuit	Barnstable	Barnstable	
Sesuet	Dennis	Barnstable	
Shawanon	Egremont	Berkshire	
Shawanon Purchase	Alford	Berkshire	
Shawmut	Boston	Suffolk	
Shawsheen	Billerica	Middlesex	
Shawshin	Billerica	Middlesex	
Sipnesset	Barnstable	Barnstable	
Skonkonet	Barnstable	Barnstable	
Skunkamug	Barnstable	Barnstable	
Slacksville	Plainville	Norfolk	
South Danvers	Peabody	Essex	
South Malden	Everett	Middlesex	
South Parish	Enfield	Hampshire	
South Purchase	Dighton	Bristol	
South Reading	Wakefield	Middlesex	
South Redding	Wakefield	Middlesex	
South Wilbraham	Hampden	Hampden	
Springfield Parish	Dover	Norfolk	
Squantums Neck	Quincy	Norfolk	Annexed to Dorchester 1641, annexed to Quincy 1792
Suckanesset	Falmouth	Barnstable	
Sudbury	Wayland	Middlesex	
Suffield Equivalent Lands	Blandford	Hampden	
Tamahappaseeacon	Barnstable	Barnstable	
Taunton	Dighton	Bristol	Different from modern Taunton
Taunton North Purchase	Easton	Bristol	
Tiverton	Freetown	Bristol	Different from modern Tiverton, Rhode Island
Tragabigzanda	Gloucester	Essex	
Tremont	Boston	Suffolk	
Trimountaine	Boston	Suffolk	
Troy	Fall River	Bristol	
Turkey Hill	Fitchburg	Worcester	
Unquityquesset	Milton	Norfolk	
Vinson's Cove	Gloucester	Essex	
Wameset	Chelmsford	Middlesex	
Waqua	Edgartown	Dukes	
Ward	Auburn	Worcester	
Washqua	Edgartown	Dukes	
Waskotussoo	Barnstable	Barnstable	
Watatick Hill	Ashburnham	Worcester	
Wattuppa	Freetown	Bristol	
Weguasset	Chatham	Barnstable	
Wellington	Dighton	Bristol	
Wequaquet	Barnstable	Barnstable	
Wessagusset Colony	Weymouth	Norfolk	Founded by Thomas Weston in 1622, 2nd oldest European settlement in Massachusetts. Incorporated as Weymouth in 1635 by settlers from the Dorset, England town of the same name.
West Cambridge	Arlington	Middlesex	
West Hoosuck	Williamstown	Berkshire	
West Sandwich	Bourne	Barnstable	
Weymouth Canada	Ashfield	Franklin	
Willard's Farm	Acton	Middlesex	
Winnissimet	Chelsea	Suffolk	
Wood End	Reading	Middlesex	
Wyngaersheek	Gloucester	Essex	
Yanno's Land	Barnstable	Barnstable	
York	Egremont	Berkshire	

== See also ==
- Administrative divisions of Massachusetts
- Equivalent Lands
- Lists of cities in the United States
- List of Massachusetts municipal seals and flags
- List of villages in Massachusetts
- Massachusetts gateway cities
