= Maine State Route 154 =

State highway in Maine, US

State Route 154

Route information
- Maintained by MaineDOT
- Length: 20.17 mi (32.46 km)

Major junctions
- West end: SR 151 in Brighton
- SR 150 in Harmony; SR 23 / SR 152 in Ripley
- East end: SR 23 in Ripley

Location
- Country: United States
- State: Maine
- Counties: Somerset, Piscataquis

Highway system
- Maine State Highway System; Interstate; US; State; Auto trails; Lettered highways
← SR 153	→ SR 155

State Route 154 (SR 154) is part of Maine's system of numbered state highways, located in Somerset and Piscataquis counties. It runs from Brighton to Ripley, and it is 20.2 miles (32.5 km) long.

== Junction list ==
County	Location	mi	km	Destinations	Notes
Somerset	Brighton	0.00	0.00	SR 151	Western terminus of SR 154
Piscataquis	No major junctions				
Somerset	Harmony	10.59	17.04	SR 150 – Guilford, Skowhegan, Cambridge, Athens	
Somerset	Ripley	17.32	27.87	SR 152 north – Cambridge	Western end of SR 152 concurrency
Somerset	Ripley	17.45	28.08	SR 23 south / SR 152 south – St. Albans	Eastern end of SR 152 concurrency; Western end of SR 23 concurrency
Somerset	Ripley	20.17	32.46	Water Street	Eastern terminus of SR 154 at the intersection with Water Street (once SR 23 south); eastern end of SR 23 concurrency; road continues east as SR 23 north
1.000 mi = 1.609 km; 1.000 km = 0.621 mi: Concurrency terminus
