= Maine State Route 150 =

State highway in Maine, US

State Route 150

Route information
- Maintained by MaineDOT
- Length: 50.65 mi (81.51 km)
- Existed: 1925–present

Major junctions
- South end: US 2 in Skowhegan
- SR 43 in Cornville; SR 151 in Athens; SR 154 in Harmony; SR 152 in Cambridge; SR 6 / SR 15 / SR 16 in Guilford
- North end: Dead end in Willimantic

Location
- Country: United States
- State: Maine
- Counties: Somerset, Piscataquis

Highway system
- Maine State Highway System; Interstate; US; State; Auto trails; Lettered highways
← SR 149	→ SR 151

State Route 150 (SR 150) is part of Maine's system of numbered state highways, located in Somerset and Piscataquis counties. Its southern terminus is in Skowhegan at the intersection with U.S. Route 2 (US 2). The northern terminus of the route is at a dead end in Willimantic near Sebec Lake.

== Junction list ==
County	Location	mi	km	Destinations	Notes
Somerset	Skowhegan	0.00	0.00	US 2 (Water Street) – Newport, Farmington	Southern terminus of SR 150
Somerset	Cornville	10.00	16.09	SR 43 west (Shadagee Road) – Madison	Southern end of SR 43 concurrency
Somerset	Athens	11.93– 11.95	19.20– 19.23	SR 43 east (Hartland Road) / SR 151 south – Hartland	Northern end of SR 43 concurrency; southern end of SR 151 concurrency
Somerset	Athens	12.21	19.65	SR 151 north (Brighton Road) – Brighton	Northern end of SR 151 concurrency
Somerset	Harmony	20.17	32.46	SR 154 (Wellington Road / Main Street) – Wellington, Ripley	
Somerset	Cambridge	24.96	40.17	SR 152 south (Ripley Road) – St. Albans	Northern terminus of SR 152
Piscataquis	Guilford	36.73	59.11	SR 6 west (Elm Street) / SR 15 north / SR 16 west – Greenville	Southern end of SR 6/SR 15/SR 16 concurrency
Piscataquis	Guilford	37.10	59.71	SR 6 east / SR 15 south / SR 16 east (Water Street) – Dover-Foxcroft	Northern end of SR 6/SR 15/SR 16 concurrency
Piscataquis	Willimantic	50.65	81.51	Dead end	
1.000 mi = 1.609 km; 1.000 km = 0.621 mi: Concurrency terminus
