= Maine State Route 43 =

State highway in Maine, US

State Route 43

Route information
- Maintained by MaineDOT
- Length: 102.72 mi (165.31 km)

Major junctions
- West end: Cummings Hill Road / Intervale Road in Temple
- US 2 / SR 4 / SR 27 in Farmington; US 201A / SR 8 / SR 148 in Anson–Madison; US 201 in Madison; SR 7 / SR 11 in Corinna; I-95 in Old Town
- East end: US 2 / US 2A in Old Town

Location
- Country: United States
- State: Maine
- Counties: Franklin, Somerset, Penobscot

Highway system
- Maine State Highway System; Interstate; US; State; Auto trails; Lettered highways
← SR 41	→ SR 46

State Route 43 (SR 43) is a state route from Cummings Hill Road and Intervale Road in Temple to U.S. Route 2 (US 2) and US 2A in Old Town. The route is 103 miles (166 km) long.

== Route description ==
Route 43 begins at an intersection with Cummings Hill Road and Intervale Road in Temple. It heads east into Farmington. The route joins U.S. Route 2 and State Route 4. U.S Route 2 leaves the routes and State Route 27 joins the routes. Route 43 heads east and junctions State Route 148. State Route 148 stays just north of the route. Then the routes have a concurrency to Anson at U.S. Route 201A and State Route 8. Route 43 crosses a river into Madison and intersects U.S. Route 201. Route 43 continues to head east and has a concurrency with State Route 150. Then it has a concurrency with State Route 151. Then it has a concurrency with State Routes 23 and 152. Route 43 heads eastward again and now the route is finally alone. Then it turns northward with State Route 11. Then the routes intersect State Route 15. After East Corinth the route is alone again. But then it has a concurrency with State Route 221. Then the route heads southeast and crosses Interstate 95 and has its eastern end at U.S. Route 2.

== Major junctions ==
County	Location	mi	km	Destinations	Notes
Franklin	Temple	0.00	0.00	Intervale Road / Cummings Hill Road	
Franklin	Farmington	4.53	7.29	US 2 west / SR 4 south (Wilton Road) – Wilton	Western end of US 2 / SR 4 concurrencies
Franklin	Farmington	4.68	7.53	US 2 east / SR 27 south (Farmington Falls Road) – New Sharon, Norridgewock, Skowhegan	Eastern end of US 2 concurrency; western end of SR 27 concurrency
Franklin	Farmington	5.32	8.56	SR 4 north / SR 27 north (Main Street) / Broadway	Eastern end of SR 4 / SR 27 concurrencies
Franklin	Industry	11.61	18.68	SR 148 east (West Mills Road) / O'Dell Road – Anson, Madison	Western terminus of SR 148
Somerset	Starks	17.50	28.16	SR 134 south – New Sharon	Northern terminus of SR 134
Somerset	Anson	24.35	39.19	SR 148 west (West Mills Road) – West Mills	Western end of SR 148 concurrency
Somerset	Anson	25.75	41.44	US 201A north / SR 8 north (Main Street) – Sugarloaf Mountain	Western end of US 201A / SR 8 concurrency
Somerset	Madison	26.23	42.21	US 201A south / SR 8 south (Old Point Avenue) – Norridgewock SR 148 east (Main Street) – Skowhegan	Eastern end of US 201A / SR 8 / SR 148 concurrencies
Somerset	Madison	34.26	55.14	US 201 – Skowhegan, Solon	Westbound traffic has a 0.05-mile (0.080 km) concurrency with US 201
Somerset	Cornville	39.71	63.91	SR 150 south (Beckwith Road) – Skowhegan	Western end of SR 150 concurrency
Somerset	Athens	41.64– 41.66	67.01– 67.05	SR 150 north / SR 151 north (Brighton Road) – Harmony	Eastern end of SR 150 concurrency; western end of SR 151 concurrency
Somerset	Hartland	53.59	86.24	SR 23 south (Lower Main Street) – Canaan	Western end of SR 23 concurrency
Somerset	Hartland	53.63	86.31	SR 152 south (Pittsfield Avenue) / Mill Street	Western end of SR 152 concurrency
Somerset	Hartland	53.82	86.61	SR 151 south (Elm Street) / Commercial Street	Eastern end of SR 151 concurrency
Somerset	St. Albans	56.62	91.12	SR 23 north / SR 152 north (Main Street) / Mason Corner Road – Cambridge, Harmony, Dexter	Eastern end of SR 23 / SR 152 concurrencies
Penobscot	Corinna	64.23	103.37	SR 7 south / SR 11 south (Newport Road) – Newport	Western end of SR 7 / SR 11 concurrencies
Penobscot	Corinna	64.29	103.46	SR 222 east (Stetson Road) – Stetson	Western terminus of SR 222
Penobscot	Corinna	64.31	103.50	SR 7 north (Dexter Road) – Dexter	Eastern end of SR 7 concurrency
Penobscot	Corinth	78.46	126.27	SR 94 west (Garland Road) / Beans Mill Road – Garland	Eastern terminus of SR 94
Penobscot	Corinth	80.09	128.89	SR 15 south (Main Street) – Kenduskeag, Bangor	Western end of SR 15 concurrency
Penobscot	Corinth	80.21	129.09	SR 11 north / SR 15 north (Main Street) – Charleston, Dover-Foxcroft	Eastern end of SR 11 / SR 15 concurrencies
Penobscot	Hudson	86.46	139.14	SR 221 north (Hudson Road) – Bradford	Western end of SR 221 concurrency
Penobscot	Hudson	88.76	142.85	SR 221 south (Hudson Road) – Bangor	Eastern end of SR 221 concurrency
Penobscot	Old Town	98.92– 99.12	159.20– 159.52	I-95 – Bangor, Medway	Exit 197 (I-95)
Penobscot	Old Town	99.66	160.39	SR 16 (Bennoch Road) – Orono, Milo	
Penobscot	Old Town	102.72	165.31	US 2 (Center Street / Main Street) / US 2A west (Center Street)	Eastern terminus of US 2A
1.000 mi = 1.609 km; 1.000 km = 0.621 mi: Concurrency terminus

== SR 43A ==
State Route 43A
- Location: Somerset County

There used to be a State Route 43A. It used what is now part of State Route 148.
