= Maine State Route 151 =

State highway in Somerset County, Maine, US

State Route 151

Route information
- Maintained by MaineDOT
- Length: 30.5 mi (49.1 km)

Major junctions
- South end: US 2 in Palmyra
- North end: SR 16 in Northeast Somerset

Location
- Country: United States
- State: Maine
- Counties: Somerset

Highway system
- Maine State Highway System; Interstate; US; State; Auto trails; Lettered highways
← SR 150	→ SR 152

State Route 151 (SR 151) is a 30.5-mile-long (49.1 km) L-shaped state highway in the U.S. state of Maine. Running entirely in Somerset County, it travels from U.S. Route 2 (US 2) in Palmyra to Northeast Somerset, an unorganized territory within the state. It passes through the towns of Hartland, Athens, and Brighton intersecting other state highways in the centers of these towns.

== Route description ==
SR 151 begins near the town center of Palmyra at US 2 (Main Street) at a stop-controlled intersection. It first heads north-northwest along Warren Hill Road through a mostly rural area passing to the west of Whites Pond. At an intersection surrounded by three houses, SR 151 turns west and turns towards the north at a small farm. It makes one more 90-degree curve to the west through wooded areas before gently curving towards the northwest into the limits of Hartland. After passing a few small businesses and a school (at this point carrying the name Elm Street), SR 151 reaches an intersection with Main Street, Academy Street, and Commercial Street. State Routes 23, 43, and 152 follow Main Street and Academny Street east-west through this intersection; SR 151 joins the concurrency of these routes by heading west along Main Street past a small factory, over the Sebasticook River, and by additional businesses. SR 152 breaks off from the concurrency at Pittsfield Avenue, SR 23 breaks off immediately afterwards at Lower Main Street while SR 43 and SR 151 bear to the northwest along Pleasant Street.

After a short distance of houses lining the street, SR 43 and SR 151 briefly parallel the Sebasticook River before transitioning to a more rural setting zig-zagging west. The road passes to the south of Great Moose Lake before crossing into the town of Athens briefly. It then heads through the northeast corner of Cornville before reentering Athens. At a wye intersection near the town center of Athens, SR 43 ends its concurrency with SR 151 while SR 150, which entered from the southwest, joins a new concurrency past small businesses in Athens. SR 150 about one-third mile (0.54 km) north of the wye intersection ends its concurrency with SR 151 by splitting to the northeast. SR 151 heads north through rolling hills and forestland. Eight miles (13 km) past Athens, the road reaches a small clearing which is the center of the town of Brighton. At the center, SR 154 has its western terminus at SR 151. SR 151 contunes north before ending at an intersection with SR 16 in the Northeast Somerset hamlet of Mayfield Corner, northwest of two small ponds.

== Major junctions ==
The entire route is in Somerset County.

Location	mi	km	Destinations	Notes
Palmyra	0.0	0.0	US 2 (Main Street)	
Hartland	5.4	8.7	SR 23 north / SR 43 east / SR 152 north (Academy Street) / Commercial Street – St. Albans	Southern end of SR 23 / SR 43 / SR 152 concurrencies
Hartland	5.6	9.0	SR 152 south (Pittsfield Avenue) / Mill Street	Northern end of SR 152 concurrency
Hartland	5.7	9.2	SR 23 south (Lower Main Street) – Canaan	Northern end of SR 23 concurrency
Athens	17.6	28.3	SR 43 west / SR 150 south (South Main Street) – Skowhegan, Madison	Northern end of SR 43 concurrency; southern end of SR 150 concurrency
Athens	17.9	28.8	SR 150 north (Harmony Road) – Harmony	Northern end of SR 150 concurrency
Brighton	26.3	42.3	SR 154 east (Main Street)	Western terminus of SR 154
Northeast Somerset	30.5	49.1	SR 16 (Mayfield Road) – Bingham, Kingsbury, Abbot	
1.000 mi = 1.609 km; 1.000 km = 0.621 mi: Concurrency terminus
