= Maine State Route 153 =

State highway in Piscataquis County, Maine, US

State Route 153

Route information
- Maintained by MaineDOT
- Length: 4.68 mi (7.53 km)
- Existed: 1925–present

Major junctions
- South end: SR 6 / SR 16 in Dover-Foxcroft
- North end: Cotton Brook Road in Dover-Foxcroft

Location
- Country: United States
- State: Maine
- Counties: Piscataquis

Highway system
- Maine State Highway System; Interstate; US; State; Auto trails; Lettered highways
← SR 152	→ SR 154

State Route 153 (SR 153) is part of Maine's system of numbered state highways. It runs 4.68 miles (7.53 km) from an intersection with SR 6 and SR 16 to an intersection with Smith Lane near Sebec Lake in Dover-Foxcroft. The route is also known as Greeley's Landing Road.

== Route description ==
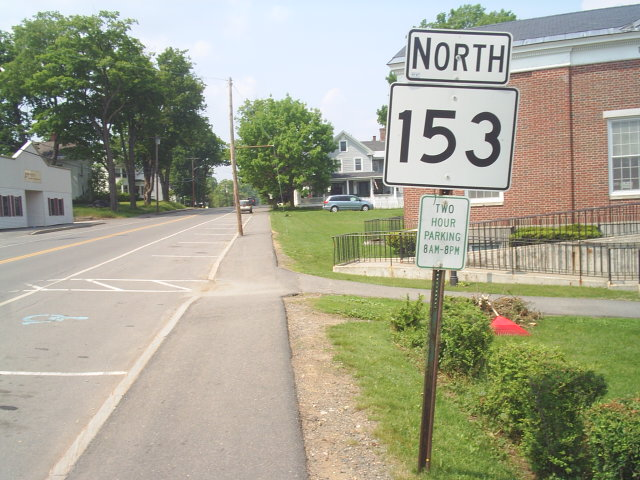
State Route 153 heading northbound through Dover-Foxcroft

SR 153 begins at its southern terminus in Dover-Foxcroft at an intersection with SR 6 / SR 16 (just north of its intersection with SR 15). It then heads north for just less than 5 miles (8.0 km) and ends at intersection with Cotton Brook Road south of Sebec Lake.

== Junction list ==
The entire route is in Dover-Foxcroft, Piscataquis County.

mi	km	Destinations	Notes
0.00	0.00	SR 6 / SR 16 (Summer Street / North Street)	
4.68	7.53	Smith Lane	
1.000 mi = 1.609 km; 1.000 km = 0.621 mi
