= Brighton Plantation, Maine =

- Plantation
- Location within Maine Location within the United States
- Coordinates: 45°01′55″N 69°42′41″W
- Country: United States
- State: Maine
- County: Somerset

Area
  - Total: 40 sq mi (104 km^{2})
  - Land: 39 sq mi (102 km^{2})
  - Water: 0.69 sq mi (1.8 km^{2})
- Elevation: 932 ft (284 m)

Population (2020)
  - Total: 62
  - Density: 1.6/sq mi (0.61/km^{2})
- Time zone: UTC-5 (Eastern (EST))
  - Summer (DST): UTC-4 (EDT)
- ZIP Codes: 04912 (Athens); 04942 (Harmony)
- Area code: 207
- FIPS code: 23-07380
- GNIS feature ID: 579053
- Website: www.brighton.maine.gov

Brighton Plantation is a plantation in Somerset County, Maine, United States. The population was 62 at the 2020 census.

== History ==
The territory previously known as T2 R1 Bingham's Kennebec Purchase was incorporated as the Town of North Hill on May 11, 1816. It was renamed Brighton on January 29, 1827. It ceded land to Athens in 1838 and 1862, and surrendered its status as a town in 1895, becoming a plantation.

== Geography ==
According to the United States Census Bureau, the plantation has a total area of 40.0 square miles (104 km^{2}), of which 39.3 square miles (102 km^{2}) is land and 0.7 square miles (1.8 km^{2}) (1.68%) is water.

== Demographics ==
Historical population
Census	Pop.	Note	%±
1830	722		—
1840	803		11.2%
1850	748		−6.8%
1860	733		−2.0%
1870	627		−14.5%
1880	585		−6.7%
1890	434		−25.8%
1900	368		−15.2%
1910	274		−25.5%
1920	293		6.9%
1930	114		−61.1%
1940	183		60.5%
1950	106		−42.1%
1960	62		−41.5%
1970	58		−6.5%
1980	74		27.6%
1990	94		27.0%
2000	86		−8.5%
2010	70		−18.6%
2020	62		−11.4%
U.S. Decennial Census

As of the census of 2000, there were 86 people, 33 households, and 23 families residing in the plantation. The population density was 2.2 inhabitants per square mile (0.85/km^{2}). There were 76 housing units at an average density of 1.9 per square mile (0.73/km^{2}). The racial makeup of the plantation was 94.19% White, 1.16% Asian, and 4.65% from two or more races.

There were 33 households, out of which 36.4% had children under the age of 18 living with them, 66.7% were married couples living together, 3.0% had a female householder with no husband present, and 27.3% were non-families. 18.2% of all households were made up of individuals, and 3.0% had someone living alone who was 65 years of age or older. The average household size was 2.61 and the average family size was 3.04.

In the plantation the population was spread out, with 29.1% under the age of 18, 4.7% from 18 to 24, 26.7% from 25 to 44, 31.4% from 45 to 64, and 8.1% who were 65 years of age or older. The median age was 35 years. For every 100 females, there were 109.8 males. For every 100 females age 18 and over, there were 110.3 males.

The median income for a household in the plantation was $27,083, and the median income for a family was $28,438. Males had a median income of $28,750 versus $16,875 for females. The per capita income for the plantation was $14,281. There were 6.9% of families and 14.6% of the population living below the poverty line, including no under eighteens and 25.0% of those over 64.
