= Dover-Foxcroft (CDP), Maine =

Dover-Foxcroft, Maine
- Census-designated place
- Location in Piscataquis County and the state of Maine
- Coordinates: 45°11′11″N 69°13′45″W
- Country: United States
- State: Maine
- County: Piscataquis

Area
  - Total: 8.61 sq mi (22.30 km^{2})
  - Land: 8.38 sq mi (21.71 km^{2})
  - Water: 0.23 sq mi (0.59 km^{2})
- Elevation: 360 ft (110 m)

Population (2020)
  - Total: 2,776
  - Density: 331.2/sq mi (127.89/km^{2})
- Time zone: UTC-5 (Eastern (EST))
  - Summer (DST): UTC-4 (EDT)
- ZIP code: 04426
- Area code: 207
- FIPS code: 23-18230
- GNIS feature ID: 0565250

Dover-Foxcroft is a census-designated place (CDP) in the town of Dover-Foxcroft in Piscataquis County, Maine, United States. The population was 2,592 at the 2000 census.

== Geography ==
Dover-Foxcroft is located at 45°11′10″N 69°13′45″W (45.186372, −69.229193).

According to the United States Census Bureau, the CDP has a total area of 8.6 square miles (22.3 km^{2}), of which 8.4 square miles (21.8 km^{2}) is land and 0.2 square mile (0.5 km^{2}) (2.21%) is water.

== Demographics ==
Historical population
Census	Pop.	Note	%±
2020	2,776		—
U.S. Decennial Census

As of the census of 2000, there were 2,592 people, 1,091 households, and 710 families residing in the CDP. The population density was 307.8 inhabitants per square mile (118.8/km^{2}). There were 1,256 housing units at an average density of 149.1 per square mile (57.6/km^{2}). The racial makeup of the CDP was 96.41% White, 0.19% Black or African American, 0.42% Native American, 0.81% Asian, 0.04% Pacific Islander, 0.19% from other races, and 1.93% from two or more races. Hispanic or Latino people of any race were 1.12% of the population.

There were 1,091 households, out of which 29.7% had children under the age of 18 living with them, 48.9% were married couples living together, 11.8% had a female householder with no husband present, and 34.9% were non-families. 29.5% of all households were made up of individuals, and 14.4% had someone living alone who was 65 years of age or older. The average household size was 2.32 and the average family size was 2.83.

In the CDP, the population was spread out, with 23.9% under the age of 18, 6.4% from 18 to 24, 26.3% from 25 to 44, 25.2% from 45 to 64, and 18.3% who were 65 years of age or older. The median age was 41 years. For every 100 females, there were 88.0 males. For every 100 females age 18 and over, there were 85.1 males.

The median income for a household in the CDP was $28,929, and the median income for a family was $39,554. Males had a median income of $28,315 versus $21,641 for females. The per capita income for the CDP was $16,692. About 9.5% of families and 13.4% of the population were below the poverty line, including 22.8% of those under age 18 and 4.6% of those age 65 or over.
