= Cambridge, Maine =

Town in Maine, United States

- Town
- Location within Maine Location within the United States
- Coordinates: 45°02′15″N 69°26′38″W
- Country: United States
- State: Maine
- County: Somerset
- Incorporated: 1834

Area
  - Total: 19.38 sq mi (50.19 km^{2})
  - Land: 19.32 sq mi (50.04 km^{2})
  - Water: 0.062 sq mi (0.16 km^{2})
- Elevation: 400 ft (120 m)

Population (2020)
  - Total: 443
  - Density: 23/sq mi (8.9/km^{2})
- Time zone: UTC-5 (Eastern (EST))
  - Summer (DST): UTC-4 (EDT)
- ZIP code: 04923
- Area code: 207
- FIPS code: 23-09655
- GNIS feature ID: 582383
- Website: cambridgemaine.com

Cambridge is a town in Somerset County, Maine, United States. The population was 443 at the 2020 census.

== Geography ==
According to the United States Census Bureau, the town has a total area of 19.38 square miles (50.19 km^{2}), of which 19.32 square miles (50.04 km^{2}) is land and 0.06 square miles (0.16 km^{2}) is water.

== Demographics ==
Historical population
Census	Pop.	Note	%±
1840	461		—
1850	487		5.6%
1860	516		6.0%
1870	472		−8.5%
1880	472		0.0%
1890	425		−10.0%
1900	364		−14.4%
1910	369		1.4%
1920	318		−13.8%
1930	324		1.9%
1940	310		−4.3%
1950	326		5.2%
1960	354		8.6%
1970	281		−20.6%
1980	445		58.4%
1990	490		10.1%
2000	492		0.4%
2010	462		−6.1%
2020	443		−4.1%
U.S. Decennial Census

=== 2010 census ===
As of the census of 2010, there were 462 people, 197 households, and 136 families living in the town. The population density was 23.9 inhabitants per square mile (9.2/km^{2}). There were 252 housing units at an average density of 13.0 per square mile (5.0/km^{2}). The racial makeup of the town was 97.4% White, 0.4% Native American, 0.6% Asian, and 1.5% from two or more races. Hispanic or Latino of any race were 1.5% of the population.

There were 197 households, of which 23.9% had children under the age of 18 living with them, 57.4% were married couples living together, 8.1% had a female householder with no husband present, 3.6% had a male householder with no wife present, and 31.0% were non-families. 21.8% of all households were made up of individuals, and 8.1% had someone living alone who was 65 years of age or older. The average household size was 2.35 and the average family size was 2.70.

The median age in the town was 48.3 years. 17.5% of residents were under the age of 18; 5.4% were between the ages of 18 and 24; 21.6% were from 25 to 44; 37.8% were from 45 to 64; and 17.5% were 65 years of age or older. The gender makeup of the town was 49.6% male and 50.4% female.

=== 2000 census ===
As of the census of 2000, there were 492 people, 193 households, and 147 families living in the town. The population density was 25.4 inhabitants per square mile (9.8/km^{2}). There were 229 housing units at an average density of 11.8 per square mile (4.6/km^{2}). The racial makeup of the town was 99.19% White, 0.41% African American, 0.20% from other races, and 0.20% from two or more races. Hispanic or Latino of any race were 0.20% of the population.

There were 193 households, out of which 31.6% had children under the age of 18 living with them, 67.4% were married couples living together, 3.6% had a female householder with no husband present, and 23.8% were non-families. 19.7% of all households were made up of individuals, and 5.7% had someone living alone who was 65 years of age or older. The average household size was 2.55 and the average family size was 2.86.

In the town, the population was spread out, with 23.6% under the age of 18, 6.5% from 18 to 24, 26.2% from 25 to 44, 29.3% from 45 to 64, and 14.4% who were 65 years of age or older. The median age was 41 years. For every 100 females, there were 100.0 males. For every 100 females age 18 and over, there were 100.0 males.

The median income for a household in the town was $28,516, and the median income for a family was $28,942. Males had a median income of $28,438 versus $20,521 for females. The per capita income for the town was $12,624. About 8.9% of families and 13.7% of the population were below the poverty line, including 20.1% of those under age 18 and 2.7% of those age 65 or over.

== History ==
Cambridge was originally part of Ripley, Maine. It was so named by a young girl studying in England. "Bunker" was the original family.
