= Palmyra, Maine =

- Town
- Location within Maine Location within the United States
- Coordinates: 44°51′45″N 69°22′24″W
- Country: United States
- State: Maine
- County: Somerset
- Incorporated: 1807

Area
  - Total: 41.44 sq mi (107.33 km^{2})
  - Land: 40.16 sq mi (104.01 km^{2})
  - Water: 1.28 sq mi (3.32 km^{2})
- Elevation: 253 ft (77 m)

Population (2020)
  - Total: 1,924
  - Density: 48/sq mi (18.5/km^{2})
- Time zone: UTC-5 (Eastern (EST))
  - Summer (DST): UTC-4 (EDT)
- ZIP code: 04965
- Area code: 207
- FIPS code: 23-56520
- GNIS feature ID: 582660
- Website: palmyratown.org

Palmyra is a town in Somerset County, Maine, United States. The population was 1,924 at the 2020 census.

== History ==
Palmyra was incorporated in 1807.

== Geography ==
According to the United States Census Bureau, the town has a total area of 41.44 square miles (107.33 km^{2}), of which 40.16 square miles (104.01 km^{2}) is land and 1.28 square miles (3.32 km^{2}) is water.

== Demographics ==
Historical population
Census	Pop.	Note	%±
1810	188		—
1820	366		94.7%
1830	902		146.4%
1840	1,500		66.3%
1850	1,625		8.3%
1860	1,597		−1.7%
1870	1,322		−17.2%
1880	1,271		−3.9%
1890	1,004		−21.0%
1900	915		−8.9%
1910	960		4.9%
1920	824		−14.2%
1930	887		7.6%
1940	934		5.3%
1950	965		3.3%
1960	1,009		4.6%
1970	1,104		9.4%
1980	1,485		34.5%
1990	1,867		25.7%
2000	1,953		4.6%
2010	1,986		1.7%
2020	1,924		−3.1%
U.S. Decennial Census

=== 2010 census ===
As of the census of 2010, there were 1,986 people, 809 households, and 552 families living in the town. The population density was 49.5 inhabitants per square mile (19.1/km^{2}). There were 943 housing units at an average density of 23.5 per square mile (9.1/km^{2}). The racial makeup of the town was 97.7% White, 0.2% African American, 0.6% Native American, 0.2% Asian, and 1.3% from two or more races. Hispanic or Latino of any race were 0.2% of the population.

There were 809 households, of which 27.6% had children under the age of 18 living with them, 53.3% were married couples living together, 10.5% had a female householder with no husband present, 4.4% had a male householder with no wife present, and 31.8% were non-families. 23.4% of all households were made up of individuals, and 10.6% had someone living alone who was 65 years of age or older. The average household size was 2.45 and the average family size was 2.87.

The median age in the town was 43.9 years. 21% of residents were under the age of 18; 6.8% were between the ages of 18 and 24; 24.1% were from 25 to 44; 30.5% were from 45 to 64; and 17.7% were 65 years of age or older. The gender makeup of the town was 49.2% male and 50.8% female.

=== 2000 census ===
As of the census of 2000, there were 1,953 people, 768 households, and 543 families living in the town. The population density was 48.6 inhabitants per square mile (18.8/km^{2}). There were 851 housing units at an average density of 21.2 per square mile (8.2/km^{2}). The racial makeup of the town was 98.52% White, 0.26% Native American, 0.36% Asian, 0.10% from other races, and 0.77% from two or more races. Hispanic or Latino of any race were 0.31% of the population.

There were 768 households, out of which 30.6% had children under the age of 18 living with them, 59.8% were married couples living together, 5.9% had a female householder with no husband present, and 29.2% were non-families. 23.3% of all households were made up of individuals, and 10.7% had someone living alone who was 65 years of age or older. The average household size was 2.54 and the average family size was 2.98.

In the town, the population was spread out, with 25.4% under the age of 18, 6.9% from 18 to 24, 27.3% from 25 to 44, 25.7% from 45 to 64, and 14.7% who were 65 years of age or older. The median age was 39 years. For every 100 females, there were 97.5 males. For every 100 females age 18 and over, there were 93.0 males.

The median income for a household in the town was $31,287, and the median income for a family was $35,150. Males had a median income of $27,500 versus $19,402 for females. The per capita income for the town was $13,717. About 12.8% of families and 16.6% of the population were below the poverty line, including 21.8% of those under age 18 and 16.1% of those age 65 or over.

== Notable people ==
- Dean Cray, member of the Maine House of Representatives
- Joshua Tardy, minority leader of the Maine House of Representatives
- James S. White, co-founder of the Seventh-day Adventist Church and Andrews University
