= Skowhegan (CDP), Maine =

Skowhegan, Maine
- Census-designated place
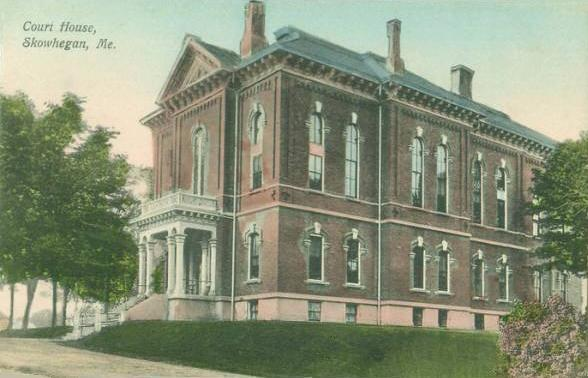
- Somerset County Superior Court

- Location within Maine Location within the United States
- Coordinates: 44°45′53″N 69°43′54″W
- Country: United States
- State: Maine
- County: Somerset

Area
  - Total: 14.09 sq mi (36.49 km^{2})
  - Land: 13.37 sq mi (34.62 km^{2})
  - Water: 0.72 sq mi (1.87 km^{2})
- Elevation: 207 ft (63 m)

Population (2020)
  - Total: 6,404
  - Density: 480/sq mi (185/km^{2})
- Time zone: UTC-5 (Eastern (EST))
  - Summer (DST): UTC-4 (EDT)
- ZIP code: 04976
- Area code: 207
- FIPS code: 23-68875
- GNIS feature ID: 2377956

Skowhegan is a census-designated place (CDP) in the town of Skowhegan in Somerset County, Maine, United States. The population was 6,404 at the 2020 census.

== Geography ==
According to the United States Census Bureau, the CDP has a total area of 14.1 square miles (36.5 km^{2}), of which 13.4 square miles (34.7 km^{2}) is land and 0.7 square mile (1.8 km^{2}) (5.04%) is water. Skowhegan is drained by the Wesserunsett Stream and Kennebec River.

== Demographics ==
Historical population
Census	Pop.	Note	%±
2020	6,404		—
U.S. Decennial Census

As of the census of 2000, there were 6,696 people, 2,883 households, and 1,764 families residing in the CDP. The population density was 500.2 inhabitants per square mile (193.1/km^{2}). There were 3,193 housing units at an average density of 238.5 per square mile (92.1/km^{2}). The racial makeup of the CDP was 97.66% White, 0.24% Black or African American, 0.45% Native American, 0.52% Asian, 0.16% from other races, and 0.97% from two or more races. Hispanic or Latino of any race were 0.70% of the population.

There were 2,883 households, out of which 28.2% had children under the age of 18 living with them, 42.5% were married couples living together, 14.4% had a female householder with no husband present, and 38.8% were non-families. 31.9% of all households were made up of individuals, and 13.1% had someone living alone who was 65 years of age or older. The average household size was 2.24 and the average family size was 2.76.

In the CDP, the population was spread out, with 22.5% under the age of 18, 8.6% from 18 to 24, 27.7% from 25 to 44, 22.9% from 45 to 64, and 18.2% who were 65 years of age or older. The median age was 39 years. For every 100 females, there were 88.6 males. For every 100 females age 18 and over, there were 84.5 males.

The median income for a household in the CDP was $26,726, and the median income for a family was $33,081. Males had a median income of $26,484 versus $20,714 for females. The per capita income for the CDP was $14,742. About 13.9% of families and 17.4% of the population were below the poverty line, including 23.3% of those under age 18 and 12.4% of those age 65 or over.
