= Hartland, Maine =

Town in Maine, United States

- Town
- Logo

- Location within Maine Location within the United States
- Coordinates: 44°52′55″N 69°31′14″W
- Country: United States
- State: Maine
- County: Somerset County
- Incorporation: February 17, 1820

Area
  - Total: 42.95 sq mi (111.24 km^{2})
  - Land: 37.10 sq mi (96.09 km^{2})
  - Water: 5.85 sq mi (15.15 km^{2})
- Elevation: 328 ft (100 m)

Population (2020)
  - Total: 1,705
  - Density: 46/sq mi (17.7/km^{2})
- Time zone: UTC-5 (Eastern (EST))
  - Summer (DST): UTC-4 (EDT)
- ZIP Code: 04943
- GNIS feature ID: 582421
- Website: townofhartlandme.com

Hartland is a town in Somerset County, Maine, United States. The population was 1,705 at the 2020 census. It contains a census-designated place of the same name.

== History ==
The area was first settled in approximately 1800, and was incorporated as Warrentown or Warrenton on February 17, 1820. It was the last town in Maine to be incorporated by the Massachusetts General Court before the Missouri Compromise which led to the birth of the state of Maine, three weeks later.

The area did not gain a library collection until 1903 when materials started being housed in the town hall. From 1935 to 1990 the library collection could be found on Commercial St in a building that now houses the Irving Tannery Outlet. In 1991 the library moved to its current location. In 1995 thanks to a donation from the tannery, the library added space for a community room and children's materials.

It is the mission of the Hartland Public Library to assemble, organize, preserve, and make easily available books and other materials which will best meet the needs of the community. The library's collection houses more than 35,000 books and seven computers which are open to the public. There is also a meeting room which can be used for community events. Hartland Public Library is governed by a board of trustees

== Geography ==
According to the United States Census Bureau, the town has a total area of 42.95 square miles (111.24 km^{2}), of which 37.10 square miles (96.09 km^{2}) is land and 5.85 square miles (15.15 km^{2}) is water.

== Demographics ==
Historical population
Census	Pop.	Note	%±
1820	411		—
1830	718		74.7%
1840	1,028		43.2%
1850	960		−6.6%
1860	1,050		9.4%
1870	1,120		6.7%
1880	1,047		−6.5%
1890	974		−7.0%
1900	1,115		14.5%
1910	1,176		5.5%
1920	1,140		−3.1%
1930	1,155		1.3%
1940	1,240		7.4%
1950	1,310		5.6%
1960	1,447		10.5%
1970	1,414		−2.3%
1980	1,669		18.0%
1990	1,806		8.2%
2000	1,816		0.6%
2010	1,782		−1.9%
2020	1,705		−4.3%
U.S. Decennial Census

=== 2010 census ===
As of the census of 2010, there were 1,782 people, 741 households, and 482 families living in the town. The population density was 48.0 inhabitants per square mile (18.5/km^{2}). There were 1,109 housing units at an average density of 29.9 per square mile (11.5/km^{2}). The racial makeup of the town was 97.0% White, 0.5% African American, 0.3% Native American, 0.4% Asian, 0.3% from other races, and 1.5% from two or more races. Hispanic or Latino of any race were 1.0% of the population.

There were 741 households, of which 26.7% had children under the age of 18 living with them, 48.3% were married couples living together, 11.7% had a female householder with no husband present, 5.0% had a male householder with no wife present, and 35.0% were non-families. 26.6% of all households were made up of individuals, and 12.9% had someone living alone who was 65 years of age or older. The average household size was 2.38 and the average family size was 2.80.

The median age in the town was 45.2 years. 21% of residents were under the age of 18; 7.7% were between the ages of 18 and 24; 20.8% were from 25 to 44; 32.3% were from 45 to 64; and 18.1% were 65 years of age or older. The gender makeup of the town was 48.3% male and 51.7% female.

=== 2000 census ===
As of the census of 2000, there were 1,816 people, 707 households, and 492 families living in the town. The population density was 49.0 inhabitants per square mile (18.9/km^{2}). There were 1,077 housing units at an average density of 29.1 per square mile (11.2/km^{2}). The racial makeup of the town was 98.07% White, 0.22% Black or African American, 0.66% Native American, 0.06% Asian, 0.06% Pacific Islander, 0.06% from other races, and 0.88% from two or more races. Hispanic or Latino of any race were 0.50% of the population.

There were 707 households, out of which 31.0% had children under the age of 18 living with them, 53.2% were married couples living together, 10.7% had a female householder with no husband present, and 30.4% were non-families. 23.8% of all households were made up of individuals, and 9.8% had someone living alone who was 65 years of age or older. The average household size was 2.48 and the average family size was 2.88.

In the town, the population was spread out, with 24.1% under the age of 18, 8.0% from 18 to 24, 27.9% from 25 to 44, 24.9% from 45 to 64, and 15.1% who were 65 years of age or older. The median age was 39 years. For every 100 females, there were 93.6 males. For every 100 females age 18 and over, there were 94.2 males.

The median income for a household in the town was $29,573, and the median income for a family was $35,400. Males had a median income of $26,522 versus $21,273 for females. The per capita income for the town was $13,629. About 11.7% of families and 17.0% of the population were below the poverty line, including 20.0% of those under age 18 and 17.7% of those age 65 or over.
