= Ripley, Maine =

Town in Maine, United States

- Town
- Location within Maine Location within the United States
- Coordinates: 45°00′21″N 69°23′41″W
- Country: United States
- State: Maine
- County: Somerset

Area
  - Total: 25.01 sq mi (64.78 km^{2})
  - Land: 24.61 sq mi (63.74 km^{2})
  - Water: 0.40 sq mi (1.04 km^{2})
- Elevation: 577 ft (176 m)

Population (2020)
  - Total: 484
  - Density: 20/sq mi (7.6/km^{2})
- Time zone: UTC-5 (Eastern (EST))
  - Summer (DST): UTC-4 (EDT)
- ZIP Code: 04930
- Area code: 207
- FIPS code: 23-62995
- GNIS feature ID: 582696

Ripley is a town in Somerset County, Maine, United States. The community was named after Brigadier General Eleazer Wheelock Ripley of the War of 1812. The population was 484 at the 2020 census.

== Geography ==
According to the United States Census Bureau, the town has a total area of 25.01 square miles (64.78 km^{2}), of which 24.61 square miles (63.74 km^{2}) is land and 0.40 square miles (1.04 km^{2}) is water.

== Demographics ==
Historical population
Census	Pop.	Note	%±
1820	325		—
1830	644		98.2%
1840	591		−8.2%
1850	641		8.5%
1860	655		2.2%
1870	584		−10.8%
1880	550		−5.8%
1890	478		−13.1%
1900	449		−6.1%
1910	434		−3.3%
1920	383		−11.8%
1930	394		2.9%
1940	331		−16.0%
1950	389		17.5%
1960	317		−18.5%
1970	297		−6.3%
1980	439		47.8%
1990	445		1.4%
2000	452		1.6%
2010	488		8.0%
2020	484		−0.8%
U.S. Decennial Census

=== 2010 census ===
As of the census of 2010, there were 488 people, 217 households, and 139 families living in the town. The population density was 19.8 inhabitants per square mile (7.6/km^{2}). There were 316 housing units at an average density of 12.8 per square mile (4.9/km^{2}). The racial makeup of the town was 99.6% White, 0.2% African American, and 0.2% from two or more races. Hispanic or Latino of any race were 0.2% of the population.

There were 217 households, of which 21.2% had children under the age of 18 living with them, 50.2% were married couples living together, 9.7% had a female householder with no husband present, 4.1% had a male householder with no wife present, and 35.9% were non-families. 25.8% of all households were made up of individuals, and 7.4% had someone living alone who was 65 years of age or older. The average household size was 2.25 and the average family size was 2.65.

The median age in the town was 49.1 years. 18.4% of residents were under the age of 18; 4.3% were between the ages of 18 and 24; 22% were from 25 to 44; 38.9% were from 45 to 64; and 16.4% were 65 years of age or older. The gender makeup of the town was 51.0% male and 49.0% female.

=== 2000 census ===
As of the census of 2000, there were 452 people, 182 households, and 141 families living in the town. The population density was 18.4 people per square mile (7.1/km^{2}). There were 262 housing units at an average density of 10.7 per square mile (4.1/km^{2}). The racial makeup of the town was 99.56% White, 0.22% Native American and 0.22% Asian.

There were 182 households, out of which 27.5% had children under the age of 18 living with them, 67.6% were married couples living together, 5.5% had a female householder with no husband present, and 22.0% were non-families. 16.5% of all households were made up of individuals, and 6.6% had someone living alone who was 65 years of age or older. The average household size was 2.48 and the average family size was 2.71.

In the town, the population was spread out, with 21.5% under the age of 18, 6.0% from 18 to 24, 28.1% from 25 to 44, 32.3% from 45 to 64, and 12.2% who were 65 years of age or older. The median age was 42 years. For every 100 females, there were 93.2 males. For every 100 females age 18 and over, there were 96.1 males.

The median income for a household in the town was $35,250, and the median income for a family was $40,000. Males had a median income of $27,411 versus $22,917 for females. The per capita income for the town was $17,224. About 4.0% of families and 6.6% of the population were below the poverty line, including 1.5% of those under age 18 and 10.0% of those age 65 or over.

== Notable person ==
- Grenville C. Emery, founder of the Harvard-Westlake School in Los Angeles
