= St. Albans, Maine =

Town in Maine, United States

- Town
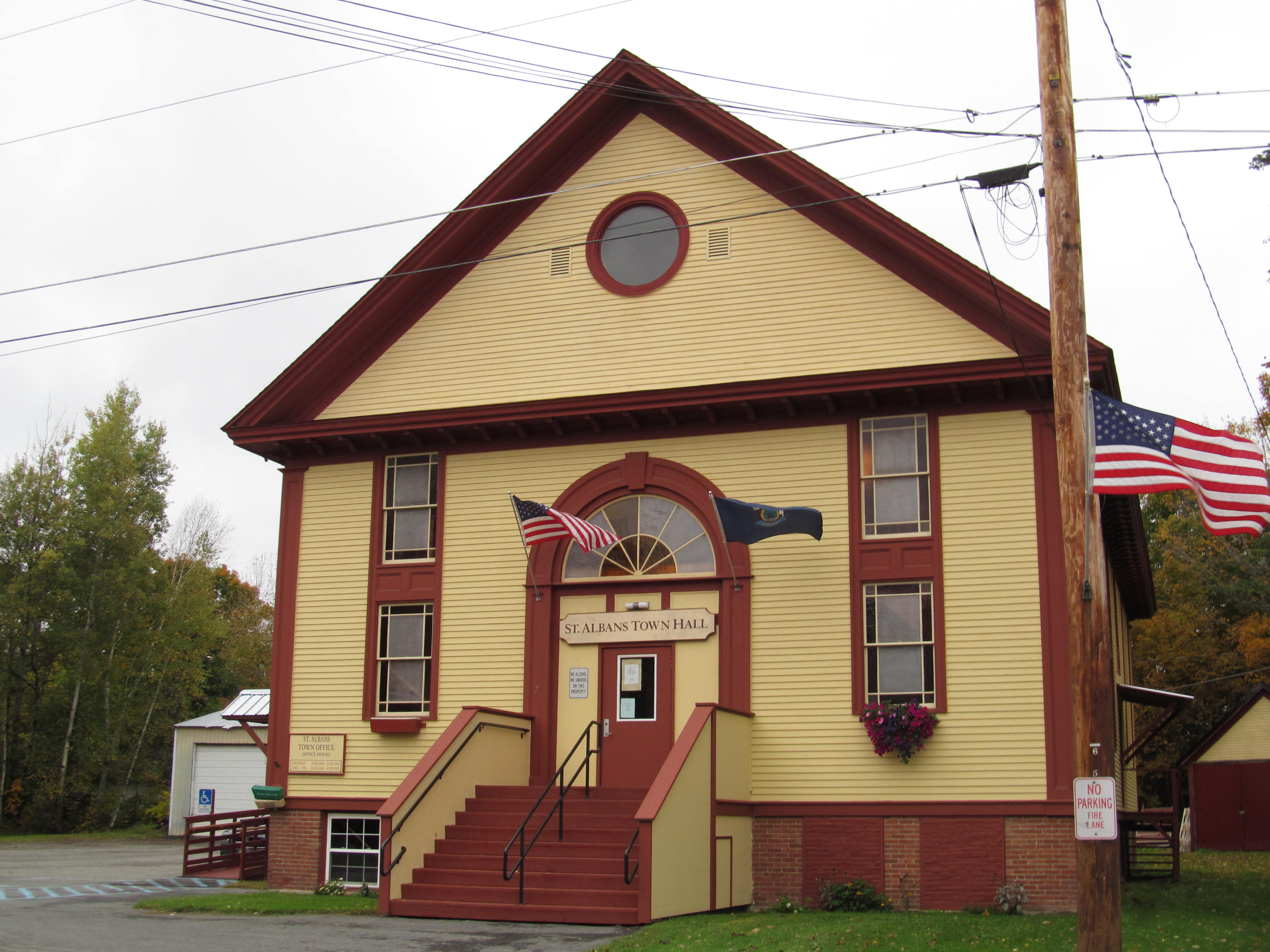
- Town Hall St. Albans, Maine

- Seal
- Motto: "From The Mountains To The Lakes"
- Location within Maine Location within the United States
- Coordinates: 44°55′58″N 69°22′15″W
- Country: United States
- State: Maine
- County: Somerset

Area
  - Total: 47.10 sq mi (121.99 km^{2})
  - Land: 44.79 sq mi (116.01 km^{2})
  - Water: 2.31 sq mi (5.98 km^{2})
- Elevation: 266 ft (81 m)

Population (2020)
  - Total: 2,045
  - Density: 46/sq mi (17.6/km^{2})
- Time zone: UTC-5 (Eastern (EST))
  - Summer (DST): UTC-4 (EDT)
- ZIP code: 04971
- Area code: 207
- FIPS code: 23-64850
- GNIS feature ID: 582707
- Website: townofstalbans.net

St. Albans or Saint Albans is a town in Somerset County, Maine, United States. The population was 2,045 at the 2020 census.

== Geography ==
According to the United States Census Bureau, the town has a total area of 47.10 square miles (121.99 km^{2}), of which 44.79 square miles (116.01 km^{2}) is land and 2.31 square miles (5.98 km^{2}) is water.

== Demographics ==
Historical population
Census	Pop.	Note	%±
1820	371		—
1830	920		148.0%
1840	1,564		70.0%
1850	1,792		14.6%
1860	1,808		0.9%
1870	1,675		−7.4%
1880	1,394		−16.8%
1890	1,206		−13.5%
1900	1,037		−14.0%
1910	1,027		−1.0%
1920	952		−7.3%
1930	1,018		6.9%
1940	950		−6.7%
1950	1,035		8.9%
1960	927		−10.4%
1970	1,041		12.3%
1980	1,400		34.5%
1990	1,724		23.1%
2000	1,836		6.5%
2010	2,005		9.2%
2020	2,045		2.0%
U.S. Decennial Census

=== 2010 census ===
As of the census of 2010, there were 2,005 people, 806 households, and 576 families living in the town. The population density was 44.8 inhabitants per square mile (17.3/km^{2}). There were 1,259 housing units at an average density of 28.1 per square mile (10.8/km^{2}). The racial makeup of the town was 97.9% White, 0.1% African American, 0.4% Native American, 0.3% Asian, and 1.2% from two or more races. Hispanic or Latino of any race were 0.4% of the population.

There were 806 households, of which 29.2% had children under the age of 18 living with them, 55.7% were married couples living together, 9.2% had a female householder with no husband present, 6.6% had a male householder with no wife present, and 28.5% were non-families. 20.7% of all households were made up of individuals, and 9.8% had someone living alone who was 65 years of age or older. The average household size was 2.47 and the average family size was 2.80.

The median age in the town was 43.9 years. 20.9% of residents were under the age of 18; 5.8% were between the ages of 18 and 24; 24.8% were from 25 to 44; 32.8% were from 45 to 64; and 15.5% were 65 years of age or older. The gender makeup of the town was 50.9% male and 49.1% female.

=== 2000 census ===
As of the census of 2000, there were 1,836 people, 718 households, and 529 families living in the town. The population density was 40.9 inhabitants per square mile (15.8/km^{2}). There were 1,100 housing units at an average density of 24.5 per square mile (9.5/km^{2}). The racial makeup of the town was 98.42% White, 0.16% African American, 0.22% Native American, 0.54% Asian, 0.33% from other races, and 0.33% from two or more races. Hispanic or Latino of any race were 0.38% of the population.

There were 718 households, out of which 29.8% had children under the age of 18 living with them, 60.9% were married couples living together, 7.8% had a female householder with no husband present, and 26.3% were non-families. 20.1% of all households were made up of individuals, and 7.9% had someone living alone who was 65 years of age or older. The average household size was 2.52 and the average family size was 2.88.

In the town, the population was spread out, with 23.9% under the age of 18, 7.9% from 18 to 24, 29.2% from 25 to 44, 27.1% from 45 to 64, and 11.8% who were 65 years of age or older. The median age was 38 years. For every 100 females, there were 102.0 males. For every 100 females age 18 and over, there were 100.4 males.

The median income for a household in the town was $28,306, and the median income for a family was $30,880. Males had a median income of $25,707 versus $19,531 for females. The per capita income for the town was $13,238. About 14.1% of families and 19.5% of the population were below the poverty line, including 31.1% of those under age 18 and 10.3% of those age 65 or over.
