= Harmony, Maine =

Town in Maine, United States

- Town
- Location within Maine Location within the United States
- Coordinates: 44°59′00″N 69°32′15″W
- Country: United States
- State: Maine
- County: Somerset

Area
  - Total: 40.32 sq mi (104.43 km^{2})
  - Land: 38.67 sq mi (100.15 km^{2})
  - Water: 1.65 sq mi (4.27 km^{2})
- Elevation: 381 ft (116 m)

Population (2020)
  - Total: 825
  - Density: 21/sq mi (8.2/km^{2})
- Time zone: UTC-5 (Eastern (EST))
  - Summer (DST): UTC-4 (EDT)
- ZIP code: 04942
- Area code: 207
- FIPS code: 23-31355
- GNIS feature ID: 579051

Harmony is a town in Somerset County, Maine, United States. The population was 825 at the 2020 census.

== Geography ==
According to the United States Census Bureau, the town has a total area of 40.32 square miles (104.43 km^{2}), of which 38.67 square miles (100.15 km^{2}) is land and 1.65 square miles (4.27 km^{2}) is water.

=== Climate ===
This climatic region is typified by large seasonal temperature differences, with warm to hot (and often humid) summers and cold (sometimes severely cold) winters. According to the Köppen Climate Classification system, Harmony has a humid continental climate, abbreviated "Dfb" on climate maps. Harmony has very wide diurnal temperature ranges in winter, with a 29 °F (16 °C) difference between average highs and lows in February.

Climate data for Harmony, Maine, 1991–2020 normals, extremes 2000–present
Month	Jan	Feb	Mar	Apr	May	Jun	Jul	Aug	Sep	Oct	Nov	Dec	Year
Record high °F (°C)	60 (16)	63 (17)	85 (29)	91 (33)	95 (35)	99 (37)	97 (36)	96 (36)	96 (36)	84 (29)	77 (25)	61 (16)	99 (37)
Mean maximum °F (°C)	50.3 (10.2)	50.3 (10.2)	59.3 (15.2)	75.1 (23.9)	86.5 (30.3)	89.6 (32.0)	91.1 (32.8)	90.1 (32.3)	87.5 (30.8)	76.1 (24.5)	64.8 (18.2)	53.1 (11.7)	93.3 (34.1)
Mean daily maximum °F (°C)	29.6 (−1.3)	32.2 (0.1)	41.3 (5.2)	54.2 (12.3)	67.2 (19.6)	75.7 (24.3)	81.4 (27.4)	80.2 (26.8)	72.8 (22.7)	59.3 (15.2)	46.3 (7.9)	34.8 (1.6)	56.2 (13.5)
Daily mean °F (°C)	16.3 (−8.7)	17.7 (−7.9)	27.8 (−2.3)	41.3 (5.2)	53.9 (12.2)	63.1 (17.3)	68.5 (20.3)	66.9 (19.4)	59.0 (15.0)	46.9 (8.3)	35.5 (1.9)	23.8 (−4.6)	43.4 (6.3)
Mean daily minimum °F (°C)	2.9 (−16.2)	3.1 (−16.1)	14.3 (−9.8)	28.3 (−2.1)	40.5 (4.7)	50.4 (10.2)	55.6 (13.1)	53.5 (11.9)	45.2 (7.3)	34.6 (1.4)	24.7 (−4.1)	12.7 (−10.7)	30.5 (−0.9)
Mean minimum °F (°C)	−15.7 (−26.5)	−13.6 (−25.3)	−7.8 (−22.1)	16.7 (−8.5)	27.7 (−2.4)	37.9 (3.3)	45.5 (7.5)	42.1 (5.6)	31.9 (−0.1)	23.9 (−4.5)	10.6 (−11.9)	−5.5 (−20.8)	−19.3 (−28.5)
Record low °F (°C)	−31 (−35)	−25 (−32)	−19 (−28)	8 (−13)	24 (−4)	27 (−3)	39 (4)	36 (2)	25 (−4)	17 (−8)	0 (−18)	−24 (−31)	−31 (−35)
Average precipitation inches (mm)	3.17 (81)	2.64 (67)	3.37 (86)	3.79 (96)	3.51 (89)	4.39 (112)	3.74 (95)	3.68 (93)	3.62 (92)	4.92 (125)	3.95 (100)	3.86 (98)	44.64 (1,134)
Average snowfall inches (cm)	17.1 (43)	20.3 (52)	16.0 (41)	4.4 (11)	0.0 (0.0)	0.0 (0.0)	0.0 (0.0)	0.0 (0.0)	0.0 (0.0)	0.4 (1.0)	4.5 (11)	16.1 (41)	78.8 (200)
Average extreme snow depth inches (cm)	15.8 (40)	19.6 (50)	19.3 (49)	8.0 (20)	0.0 (0.0)	0.0 (0.0)	0.0 (0.0)	0.0 (0.0)	0.0 (0.0)	0.2 (0.51)	2.8 (7.1)	10.4 (26)	23.9 (61)
Average precipitation days (≥ 0.01 in)	11.0	9.6	10.8	11.2	13.5	14.1	13.5	11.5	10.4	12.5	11.4	12.9	142.4
Average snowy days (≥ 0.1 in)	7.3	6.6	4.7	1.4	0.0	0.0	0.0	0.0	0.0	0.1	2.2	6.3	28.6
Source 1: NOAA
Source 2: National Weather Service (mean maxima/minima 2006–2020)

== Demographics ==
Historical population
Census	Pop.	Note	%±
1810	351		—
1820	584		66.4%
1830	925		58.4%
1840	1,096		18.5%
1850	1,107		1.0%
1860	1,081		−2.3%
1870	978		−9.5%
1880	881		−9.9%
1890	704		−20.1%
1900	571		−18.9%
1910	730		27.8%
1920	838		14.8%
1930	793		−5.4%
1940	788		−0.6%
1950	709		−10.0%
1960	712		0.4%
1970	650		−8.7%
1980	755		16.2%
1990	838		11.0%
2000	954		13.8%
2010	939		−1.6%
2020	825		−12.1%
U.S. Decennial Census

=== 2010 census ===
As of the census of 2010, there were 939 people, 399 households, and 273 families living in the town. The population density was 24.3 inhabitants per square mile (9.4/km^{2}). There were 608 housing units at an average density of 15.7 per square mile (6.1/km^{2}). The racial makeup of the town was 96.5% White, 0.1% African American, 0.4% Native American, 0.7% Asian, 0.3% from other races, and 1.9% from two or more races. Hispanic or Latino of any race were 0.5% of the population.

There were 399 households, of which 24.3% had children under the age of 18 living with them, 54.6% were married couples living together, 7.8% had a female householder with no husband present, 6.0% had a male householder with no wife present, and 31.6% were non-families. 25.3% of all households were made up of individuals, and 13.1% had someone living alone who was 65 years of age or older. The average household size was 2.35 and the average family size was 2.79.

The median age in the town was 49.4 years. 19.1% of residents were under the age of 18; 3.8% were between the ages of 18 and 24; 19.9% were from 25 to 44; 36.2% were from 45 to 64; and 20.9% were 65 years of age or older. The gender makeup of the town was 50.1% male and 49.9% female.

=== 2000 census ===
As of the census of 2000, there were 954 people, 388 households, and 301 families living in the town. The population density was 24.6 inhabitants per square mile (9.5/km^{2}). There were 522 housing units at an average density of 13.5 per square mile (5.2/km^{2}). The racial makeup of the town was 97.59% White, 0.94% Native American, 0.42% Asian, 0.21% from other races, and 0.84% from two or more races.

There were 388 households, out of which 25.8% had children under the age of 18 living with them, 60.3% were married couples living together, 10.3% had a female householder with no husband present, and 22.4% were non-families. 17.5% of all households were made up of individuals, and 8.5% had someone living alone who was 65 years of age or older. The average household size was 2.45 and the average family size was 2.70.

In the town, the population was spread out, with 20.5% under the age of 18, 6.2% from 18 to 24, 25.8% from 25 to 44, 29.1% from 45 to 64, and 18.3% who were 65 years of age or older. The median age was 44 years. For every 100 females, there were 96.7 males. For every 100 females age 18 and over, there were 94.9 males.

The median income for a household in the town was $23,843, and the median income for a family was $26,131. Males had a median income of $23,036 versus $18,056 for females. The per capita income for the town was $12,360. About 16.1% of families and 20.3% of the population were below the poverty line, including 25.1% of those under age 18 and 14.4% of those age 65 or over.

== Popular culture ==
Location filming for the 1990 movie Graveyard Shift, based on the short story by Stephen King, took place in Harmony.

== Notable people ==
- Helen Marr Hurd, educator and poet
- Freeman Knowles, U.S. representative from South Dakota
- Clyde H. Smith, U.S. representative from Maine
- Bartlett Tripp, chief justice of the Dakota Territorial Supreme Court and U.S. ambassador to Austria
