= Athens, Maine =

Town in Maine, United States

- Town
- Location within the state of Maine Athens (the United States) Athens (North America)
- Coordinates: 44°57′45″N 69°38′49″W
- Country: United States
- State: Maine
- County: Somerset

Area
  - Total: 43.61 sq mi (112.95 km^{2})
  - Land: 43.60 sq mi (112.92 km^{2})
  - Water: 0.012 sq mi (0.03 km^{2})
- Elevation: 463 ft (141 m)

Population (2020)
  - Total: 952
  - Density: 8.4/sq mi (3.2/km^{2})
- Time zone: UTC-5 (Eastern (EST))
  - Summer (DST): UTC-4 (EDT)
- ZIP code: 04912
- Area code: 207
- FIPS code: 23-01885
- GNIS feature ID: 579052
- Website: www.athens.maine.gov

Athens is a town in Somerset County, Maine, United States. The population was 952 at the 2020 census.

== Geography ==
According to the United States Census Bureau, the town has a total area of 43.61 square miles (112.95 km^{2}).

== Demographics ==
Historical population
Census	Pop.	Note	%±
1810	374		—
1820	590		57.8%
1830	1,200		103.4%
1840	1,427		18.9%
1850	1,460		2.3%
1860	1,417		−2.9%
1870	1,540		8.7%
1880	1,310		−14.9%
1890	1,072		−18.2%
1900	896		−16.4%
1910	914		2.0%
1920	766		−16.2%
1930	760		−0.8%
1940	742		−2.4%
1950	725		−2.3%
1960	602		−17.0%
1970	592		−1.7%
1980	802		35.5%
1990	897		11.8%
2000	847		−5.6%
2010	1,019		20.3%
2020	952		−6.6%
U.S. Decennial Census

=== 2010 census ===
As of the census of 2010, there were 1,019 people, 391 households, and 270 families living in the town. The population density was 23.4 inhabitants per square mile (9.0/km^{2}). There were 577 housing units at an average density of 13.2 per square mile (5.1/km^{2}). The racial makeup of the town was 97.4% White, 0.2% African American, 0.9% Native American, 0.1% Asian, 0.1% from other races, and 1.4% from two or more races. Hispanic or Latino of any race were 0.6% of the population.

There were 391 households, of which 33.0% had children under the age of 18 living with them, 49.6% were married couples living together, 10.7% had a female householder with no husband present, 8.7% had a male householder with no wife present, and 30.9% were non-families. 22.5% of all households were made up of individuals, and 7.7% had someone living alone who was 65 years of age or older. The average household size was 2.55 and the average family size was 2.99.

The median age in the town was 40.4 years. 24.5% of residents were under the age of 18; 7.2% were between the ages of 18 and 24; 25.7% were from 25 to 44; 29.9% were from 45 to 64; and 12.8% were 65 years of age or older. The gender makeup of the town was 50.7% male and 49.3% female.

=== 2000 census ===
As of the census of 2000, there were 847 people, 327 households, and 225 families living in the town. The population density was 19.5 people per square mile (7.5/km^{2}). There were 484 housing units at an average density of 11.1 per square mile (4.3/km^{2}). The racial makeup of the town was 99.53% White, 0.12% African American, 0.24% Native American, and 0.12% from two or more races. Hispanic or Latino of any race were 0.71% of the population.

There were 327 households, out of which 33.0% had children under the age of 18 living with them, 54.7% were married couples living together, 9.8% had a female householder with no husband present, and 30.9% were non-families. 22.9% of all households were made up of individuals, and 6.4% had someone living alone who was 65 years of age or older. The average household size was 2.52 and the average family size was 2.92.

In the town, the population was spread out, with 24.9% under the age of 18, 5.9% from 18 to 24, 32.2% from 25 to 44, 24.9% from 45 to 64, and 12.0% who were 65 years of age or older. The median age was 37 years. For every 100 females, there were 97.0 males. For every 100 females age 18 and over, there were 91.6 males.

The median income for a household in the town was $24,813, and the median income for a family was $32,841. Males had a median income of $24,545 versus $20,139 for females. The per capita income for the town was $13,786. About 17.0% of families and 22.9% of the population were below the poverty line, including 28.9% of those under age 18 and 12.0% of those age 65 or over.

== Government ==
Athens has a chief executive officer and three town selectmen. There is no police department, a volunteer fire department, and private water and sewer facilities.

== Education ==
Athens is a part of Maine School Administrative District 94, which voted to include Athens in 2014. Athens was previously in the Maine School Administrative District 59, but in May 2013 the community voted to leave District 59.
