= Maine State Route 104 =

State highway in central Maine, US

State Route 104

Route information
- Maintained by MaineDOT
- Length: 34.94 mi (56.23 km)

Major junctions
- South end: SR 8 / SR 11 / SR 27 in Augusta
- SR 3 in Augusta; US 201 / SR 11 / SR 100 in Waterville; I-95 in Fairfield
- North end: US 2 / US 201 / US 201A in Skowhegan

Location
- Country: United States
- State: Maine
- Counties: Kennebec, Somerset

Highway system
- Maine State Highway System; Interstate; US; State; Auto trails; Lettered highways
← SR 103	→ SR 105

State Route 104 (SR 104) is a 34.9-mile-long (56.2 km) state highway located in Kennebec and Somerset counties in central Maine. Its southern terminus is at SR 8, SR 11 and SR 27 in Augusta. Its northern terminus is at U.S. Route 2 (US 2), US 201 and US 201A in Skowhegan.

== Route description ==
SR 104 begins at SR 8/SR 11/SR 27 at the intersection of Bond Street and State Street / Mount Vernon Avenue in downtown Augusta. After traveling one block east along Bond Street, SR 104 proceeds north along Water Street and the west bank of the Kennebec River. It then intersects SR 3. As it enters Waterville, it intersects SR 137 and SR 11, with which SR 104 has a concurrency. Then after crossing the Messalonskee Stream, SR 137 breaks off to the south on Carter Memorial Drive and SR 137 Business (SR 137 Bus.) begins.

Through Waterville, SR 11/SR 104/SR 137 Bus. travel northeast along Silver Street. SR 11 and SR 104 turn onto Elm Street into the city's business district. At a junction with Elm Street, Main Street, and College Avenue, SR 104 branches off of SR 11 and travels north on Main Street. The southbound direction of US 201 and SR 100 also pass through this intersection but do not form concurrencies with SR 104. North of the downtown area, it has an interchange with Interstate 95 at its exit 130. Starting in Fairfield, SR 104 has a 2.8-mile (4.5 km) concurrency with SR 139. There is also an intersection with SR 23 which has a 150-foot-long (46 m) concurrency with the SR 104/SR 139. SR 104 then branches off of SR 139 in North Fairfield. It continues ten miles (16 km) north to its northern terminus at US 2/US 201/SR 201A in Skowhegan.

== History ==
The southern terminus of SR 104 was originally located at the roundabout where State Street, Memorial Drive and Western Avenue meet (along with seven different numbered routes, not including SR 104) in downtown Augusta, a terminus it shared with SR 8. SR 104 was cosigned with SR 8, SR 11 and SR 27 northbound along State Street before splitting at Bond Street onto its current alignment.

Sometime in the early 2010s, its designation was removed from State Street, after a change which prohibited traffic traveling south on 104 from turning left onto State St. from Bond St. eliminating SR 104 from the concurrency and shortening its length by approximately 0.8 miles (1.3 km).

== Major intersections ==
County	Location	mi	km	Destinations	Notes
Kennebec	Augusta	0.00	0.00	SR 8 / SR 11 / SR 27 (State Street / Mount Vernon Avenue) – Auburn, Gardiner	
Kennebec	Augusta	2.05	3.30	SR 3 to I-95 – Belfast, Belgrade	
Kennebec	Waterville	17.55	28.24	SR 11 south / SR 137 west (Kennedy Memorial Drive) – Oakland	Southern end of SR 11 / SR 137 concurrency
Kennebec	Waterville	17.58– 17.63	28.29– 28.37	SR 137 east (Carter Memorial Drive) – China SR 137 Bus. begins	Northern end of concurrency with SR 137; Western terminus of SR 137 Business
Kennebec	Waterville	18.33	29.50	SR 137 Bus. east (Silver Street) – Winslow	Eastern end of concurrency with SR 137 Business
Kennebec	Waterville	18.87	30.37	US 201 south / SR 11 north / SR 100 south (Main Street/College Avenue) – Fairfield, Winslow	Northern end of concurrency with SR 11
Kennebec	Waterville	20.21– 20.33	32.52– 32.72	I-95 – Auburn, Bangor	Exit 130 on I-95
Somerset	Fairfield	22.29	35.87	SR 139 east (Center Road) – Fairfield	Southern end of SR 139 concurrency
Somerset	Fairfield	22.94– 22.97	36.92– 36.97	SR 23 (Oakland Road/Ohio Hill Road) – Oakland, Canaan	
Somerset	Fairfield	25.07	40.35	SR 139 west (Norridgewock Road) – Norridgewock	Northern end of SR 139 concurrency
Somerset	Skowhegan	34.94	56.23	US 2 west / US 201A north (West Front Street) – Norridgewock US 2 east / US 201 north (Main Street) to SR 150 – Solon, Canaan US 201 south (Waterville Road) – Waterville	Northern terminus; southern terminus of US 201A
1.000 mi = 1.609 km; 1.000 km = 0.621 mi: Concurrency terminus
