= Maine State Route 8 =

North-south state highway in Maine, US

State Route 8

Route information
- Maintained by MaineDOT
- Length: 51.60 mi (83.04 km)
- Existed: 1955–present

Major junctions
- South end: US 201 / SR 11 / SR 27 / SR 100 in Augusta
- SR 3 in Augusta; US 2 / US 201A in Norridgewock
- North end: US 201 / US 201A in Solon

Location
- Country: United States
- State: Maine
- Counties: Kennebec, Somerset

Highway system
- Maine State Highway System; Interstate; US; State; Auto trails; Lettered highways
| ← SR 7 | → SR 9 |

State Route 8 (SR 8) is part of Maine's system of numbered state highways, running from U.S. Route 201 (US 201) at Memorial Circle in Augusta, to an intersection with US 201 in Solon. SR 8 is 51.6 miles (83.0 km) long.

SR 8 goes north from Augusta through the Belgrade Lakes region, running concurrently with Routes 11 and 27 to Belgrade. The road continues northeast from Belgrade to Norridgewock, where it intersects US 2. The route joins with US 201A and follows the Kennebec River through Madison and Anson to its north end at Solon.

== Junction list ==
| County | Location | mi | km | Destinations | Notes |
|---|---|---|---|---|---|
| Kennebec | Augusta | 0.00 | 0.00 | US 202 west / SR 11 south / SR 17 west / SR 100 south to I-95 – Winthrop US 201 south / SR 27 south – Gardiner, Hallowell US 201 north / US 202 east / SR 17 east / SR 100 north to SR 3 – Waterville, Rockland, Belfast SR 104 north | Roundabout; Southern terminus of SR 8 and SR 104; Southern terminus of concurrency with SR 11, SR 27, and SR 104 |
| Kennebec | Augusta | 0.8 | 1.3 | SR 104 north – Sidney | Northern terminus of concurrency with SR 104 |
| Kennebec | Augusta | 3.0 | 4.8 | I-95 – Portland, Lewiston, Waterville | Exit 112 (I-95) |
| Kennebec | Sidney | 6.6 | 10.6 | SR 23 north – Oakland | Southern terminus of SR 23 |
| Kennebec | Belgrade | 11.8 | 19.0 | SR 27 north – Belgrade Lakes, Farmington | Northern terminus of concurrency with SR 27 |
| Kennebec | Belgrade | 12.2 | 19.6 | SR 135 south – Belgrade Lakes, Readfield | Northern terminus of SR 135 |
| Kennebec | Belgrade | 15.0 | 24.1 | SR 11 north – Oakland | Northern terminus of concurrency with SR 11 |
| Somerset | Smithfield | 21.3 | 34.3 | SR 137 east – Oakland | Eastern terminus of concurrency with SR 137 |
| Somerset | Smithfield | 21.4 | 34.4 | SR 225 west – Rome | Eastern terminus of SR 225 |
| Somerset | Smithfield | 24.6 | 39.6 | SR 137 west – New Sharon, Mercer | Western terminus of concurrency with SR 137 |
| Somerset | Norridgewock | 30.5 | 49.1 | US 2 east / US 201A south – Skowhegan SR 139 east – Fairfield, Waterville | Southern terminus of concurrency with US 2 and US 201A; Western terminus of SR 139 |
| Somerset | Norridgewock | 30.9 | 49.7 | US 2 west – Mercer, Farmington | Northern terminus of concurrency with US 2 |
| Somerset | Madison | 38.6 | 62.1 | SR 43 east – Athens SR 148 east – Lakewood | Eastern terminus of concurrency with SR 43 and SR 148 |
| Somerset | Anson | 39.1 | 62.9 | SR 43 west / SR 148 west – Farmington | Western terminus of concurrency with SR 43 and SR 148 |
| Somerset | Anson | 43.6 | 70.2 | SR 234 west – New Vineyard | Eastern terminus of SR 234 |
| Somerset | Anson | 43.8 | 70.5 | SR 16 west – Kingfield, New Portland | Western terminus of concurrency with SR 16 |
| Somerset | Embden | 50.5 | 81.3 | SR 16 east – Bingham | Eastern terminus of concurrency with SR 16 |
| Somerset | Solon | 51.6 | 83.0 | US 201 – Bingham, Skowhegan US 201A ends | Northern terminus of SR 8 and US 201A |
1.000 mi = 1.609 km; 1.000 km = 0.621 mi: Concurrency terminus
