= Maine State Route 16 =

State highway in Maine, US

State Route 16
- Route of SR 16 highlighted in red

Route information
- Maintained by MaineDOT
- Length: 190.61 mi (306.76 km)

Major junctions
- West end: NH 16 in Wentworth Location, NH
- US 201 in Bingham; SR 6 from Abbot to Lagrange; SR 11 in Milo; I-95 in Old Town
- East end: US 2 in Orono

Location
- Country: United States
- State: Maine
- Counties: Oxford, Franklin, Somerset, Piscataquis, Penobscot

Highway system
- Maine State Highway System; Interstate; US; State; Auto trails; Lettered highways
← SR 15	→ SR 17

State Route 16 (SR 16) is a numbered state highway in Maine, United States. SR 16 runs from the New Hampshire state line (signed as NH-16) at Wentworth Location (near Lake Aziscohos) in the west to Orono at the eastern terminus. State Route 16 runs a total of 190 miles (310 km), passing mostly through rural areas, with the largest population center at its eastern terminus in Orono at Interstate 95 (I-95).

Route 16 follows a rather circuitous route between the two states, originating in Portsmouth, New Hampshire, at Interstate 95, and re-intersecting Interstate 95 some 340 miles (550 km) later in Orono.

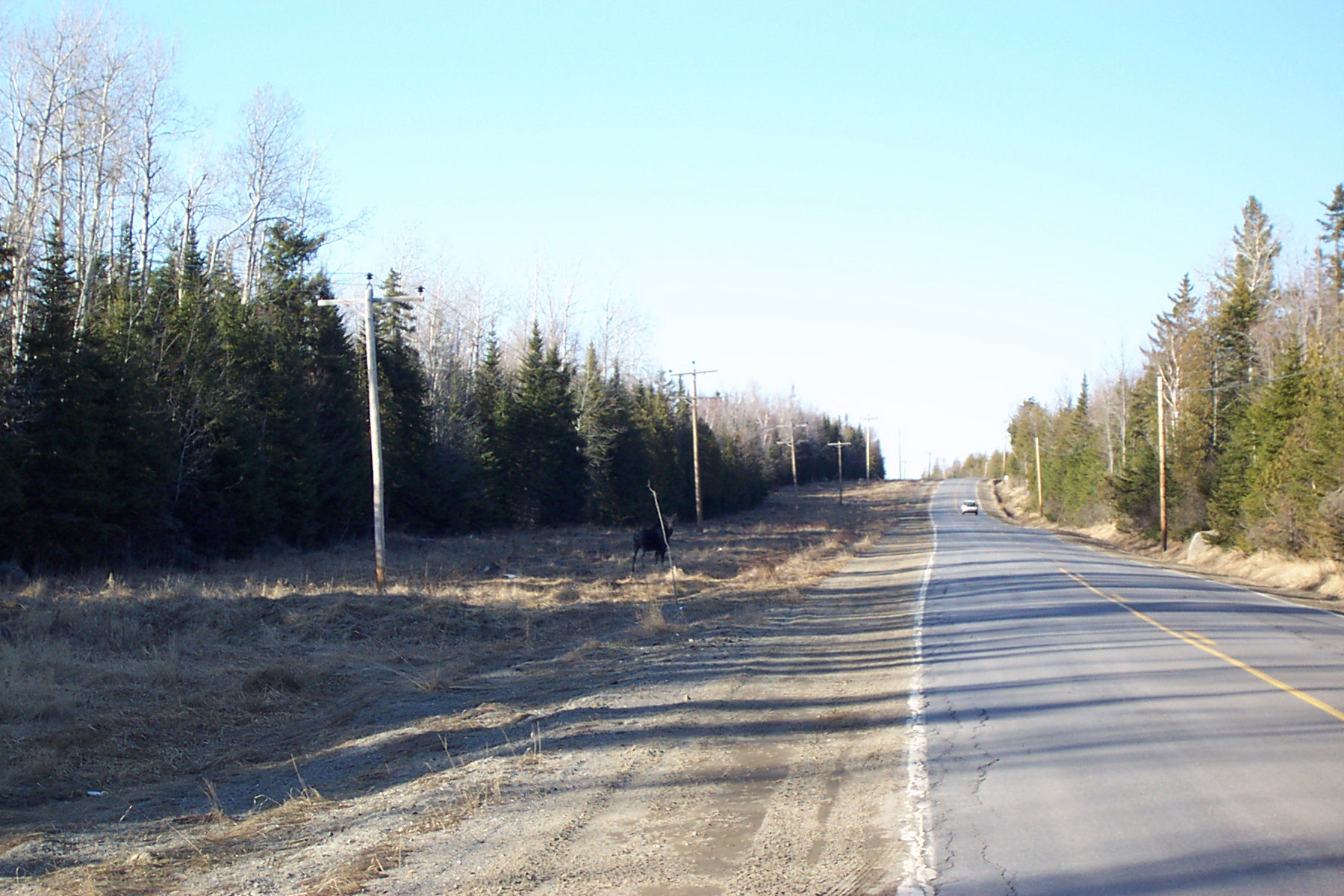
A moose stands beside Route 16 between Rangeley and Stratton

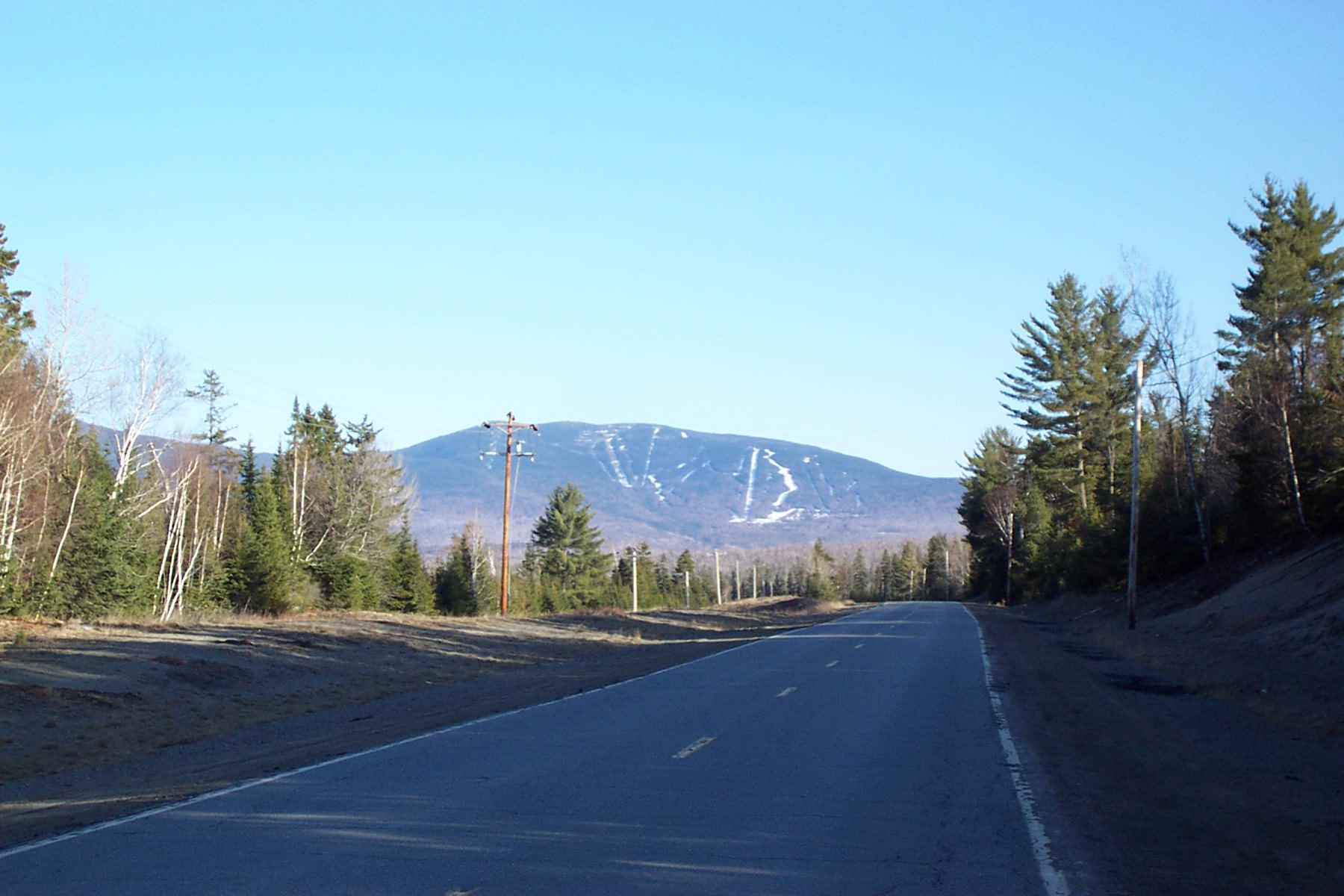
Saddleback Maine ski area seen from Route 16

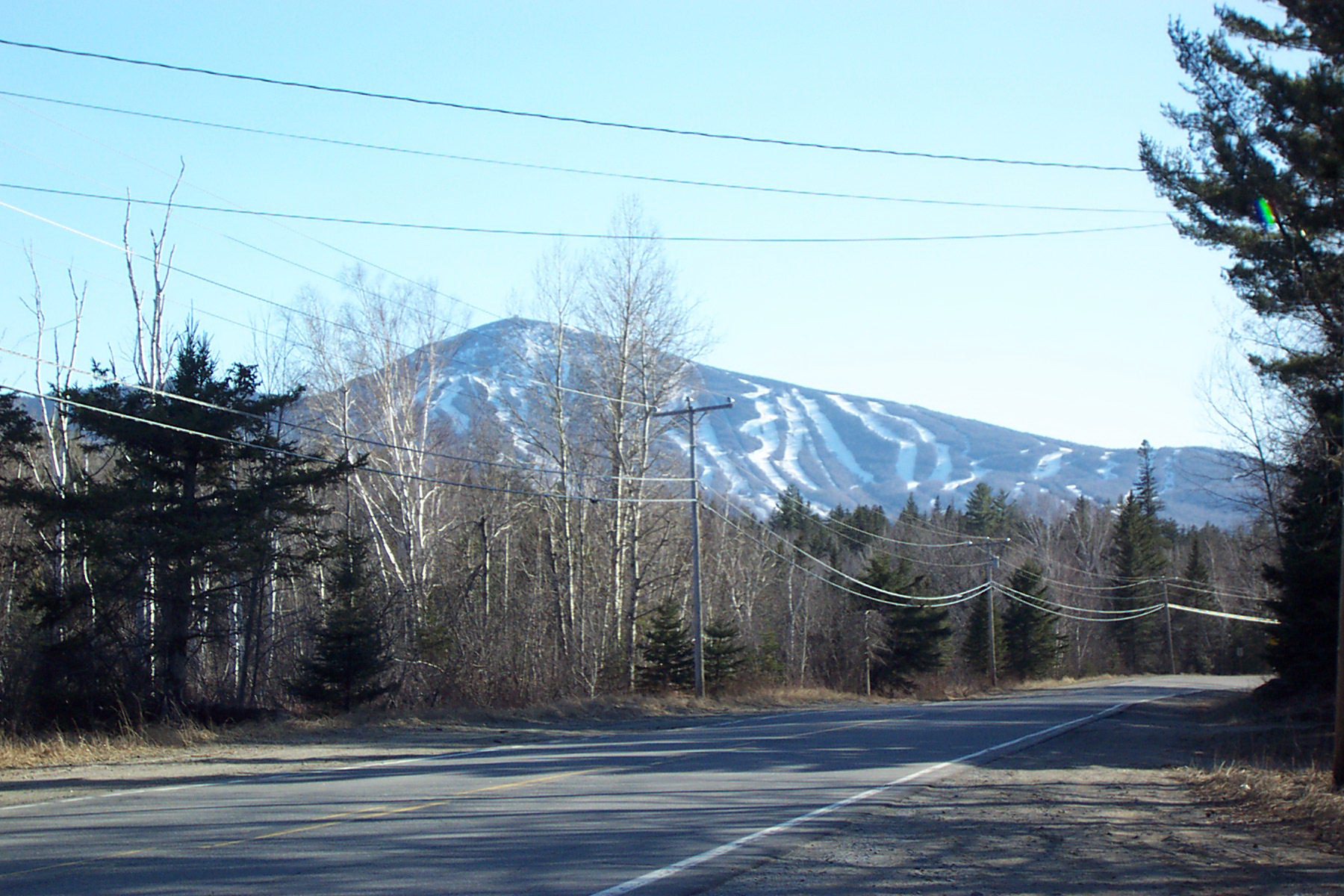
Sugarloaf USA ski area seen from Routes 16 and 27

== History ==
As originally designated, SR 16 crossed the state from Haines Landing to New Brunswick. In 1936, it was rerouted to extend west from Oquossoc to the New Hampshire border. In 1949, the route was truncated to Milo, but, in 1955, it was extended to its current eastern terminus in Orono.

== Route description ==
SR 16 begins at the western border of the state in Magalloway Township. It then takes a northeasterly route through Oxford County, passing through Rangeley along the way. In Eustis, the route turns southeasterly along with SR 27 into Somerset County. It then takes a northwards jog parallelling US 201 before crossing it in Bingham and turning eastwards. This eastwards direction continues until the route reaches Milo, where it turns southward once again to its terminus in Orono.

== Major intersections ==
County	Location	mi	km	Destinations	Notes
Oxford	Magalloway	0.0	0.0	NH 16 south (Dam Road)	Maine-New Hampshire state line
Franklin	Rangeley	26.8	43.1	SR 4 north – Oquossoc	Begin SR 4 concurrency
Franklin	Rangeley	33.2	53.4	SR 4 south (Main Street) – Farmington	End SR 4 concurrency
Franklin	Eustis	51.8	83.4	SR 27 north – Eustis	Begin SR 27 concurrency
Franklin	Kingfield	74.9	120.5	SR 142 west – Phillips	Terminus of SR 142
Franklin	Kingfield	74.9	120.5	SR 27 south – Farmington	End SR 27 concurrency
Somerset	New Portland	82.3	132.4	SR 146 south – New Portland	Terminus of SR 146
Somerset	Anson	90.9	146.3	US 201A / SR 8 south (Main Street) – Anson, Madison	Begin US 201A/SR 8 concurrency
Somerset	Embden	97.7	157.2	US 201A / SR 8 north (Ferry Street) to US 201 – Bingham, Solon	End US 201A/SR 8 concurrency
Somerset	Bingham	106.8	171.9	US 201 south (Main Street)	Begin US 201 concurrency
Somerset	Bingham	107.4	172.8	US 201 north (Main Street) – Jackman, Quebec	End US 201 concurrency
Somerset	Mayfield Township	117.8	189.6	SR 151 south (Athens Road) – Brighton	Terminus of SR 151
Piscataquis	Abbot	131.5	211.6	SR 6 / SR 15 north (Tenney Hill Road) – Greenville	Begin SR 6/SR 15 concurrency
Piscataquis	Guilford	135.9	218.7	SR 150 south (Main Street) – Skowhegan	Begin SR 150 concurrency
Piscataquis	Guilford	136.3	219.4	SR 150 north (Blaine Avenue)	End SR 150 concurrency
Piscataquis	Guilford	137.3	221.0	SR 23 south (Bridge Street) – Dexter, Newport	Terminus of SR 23
Piscataquis	Dover-Foxcroft	144.0	231.7	SR 15 south (Main Street) – Bangor	End SR 15 concurrency
Piscataquis	Dover-Foxcroft	144.0	231.7	SR 153 north (North Street) – Peaks-Kenny State Park	Terminus of SR 153
Piscataquis	Milo	157.1	252.8	SR 11 north (Park Street) – Brownville	Begin SR 11 concurrency
Piscataquis	Milo	159.3	256.4	SR 11 south (Lyford Road) – East Corinth	End SR 11 concurrency
Penobscot	Lagrange	166.9	268.6	SR 6 east / SR 155 (Howland Road) – Howland, Bradford	End SR 6 concurrency
Penobscot	Old Town	181.1	291.5	I-95 south – Bangor	Exit 199; Southbound access only
Penobscot	Old Town	181.9	292.7	SR 116 north (Argyle Road) – Howland	Terminus of SR 116
Penobscot	Old Town	184.2	296.4	SR 43 (Gilman Falls Avenue) to I-95	
Penobscot	Orono	190.6	306.7	US 2 (Main Street)	Eastern terminus of SR 16
1.000 mi = 1.609 km; 1.000 km = 0.621 mi: Concurrency terminus; Incomplete access
