= Maine State Route 139 =

East-west state highway in Maine, US

State Route 139

Route information
- Maintained by MaineDOT
- Length: 58.87 mi (94.74 km)

Major junctions
- West end: US 2 / US 201A in Norridgewock
- SR 104 in Fairfield; I-95 in Fairfield; US 201 in Fairfield; SR 11 / SR 100 in Benton; US 202 / SR 9 in Unity; SR 7 in Brooks
- East end: US 1A / SR 69 in Winterport

Location
- Country: United States
- State: Maine
- Counties: Somerset, Kennebec, Waldo

Highway system
- Maine State Highway System; Interstate; US; State; Auto trails; Lettered highways
← SR 138	→ SR 140

State Route 139 (SR 139) is a 59-mile-long (95 km) state highway traveling from U.S. Route 2 (US 2) and US 201A in Norridgewock at its western terminus to US 1A in Winterport at its eastern terminus.

== Route description ==
SR 139 begins at an intersection with U.S. Route 201A, U.S. Route 2, and SR 8 in Norridgewock. The intersection of SR 139 and U.S. Route 2 is notorious for being one of the most dangerous intersections in central Maine. SR 139 then heads south and joins SR 104 for a 2.78 mile concurrency, during which it intersects with SR 23, followed by an interchange with Interstate 95. The section of SR 139 between U.S. Route 2 in Norridgewock and Interstate 95 in Fairfield is often used as a bypass of U.S Route 2 through Skowhegan. From the interchange with Interstate 95, as it heads east there is a 0.22 concurrency with U.S. Route 201 in Fairfield and then a 2.23 mile concurrency with SR 11 and SR 100 in Benton. SR 139 continues on to have a 0.18 mile concurrency with U.S. Route 202 and SR 9 before once more being without concurrent routes for 0.69 miles in Unity and then begins a 3.5 mile concurrency with SR 220 in Thorndike. SR 139 intersects Former SR 203 at its then northern terminus and then SR 7 as it continues through Brooks. It then continues into Monroe, where it intersects SR 141 at SR 141's northern terminus. From there, SR 139 has a 1.67 mile concurrency with SR 69 and reaches its western terminus at US Route 1A in Winterport.

== Major junctions ==
County	Location	mi	km	Destinations	Notes
Somerset	Norridgewock	0.00	0.00	US 2 / US 201A (Main Street / Skowhegan Road) to SR 8 / Hotel Street – Farmington, Smithfield, Skowhegan	
Somerset	Fairfield	7.81	12.57	SR 104 north (Middle Road) – Skowhegan	Western end of SR 104 concurrency
Somerset	Fairfield	9.91– 9.94	15.95– 16.00	SR 23 (Ohio Hill Road / Oakland Road) – Fairfield, Oakland	
Somerset	Fairfield	10.59	17.04	SR 104 south (Norridgewock Road) – Waterville	Eastern end of SR 104 concurrency
Somerset	Fairfield	12.51– 12.70	20.13– 20.44	I-95 – Bangor, Augusta	Exit 132 (I-95)
Somerset	Fairfield	13.64	21.95	US 201 north (Upper Main Street) – Skowhegan	Western end of US 201 concurrency
Somerset	Fairfield	13.86	22.31	US 201 south / SR 11 south / SR 100 south (Upper Main Street) / Lawrence Street	Eastern end of US 201 concurrency; western end of SR 11 / SR 100 concurrency
Kennebec	Benton	15.97– 16.02	25.70– 25.78	SR 100A south (Clinton Avenue) – Winslow	Northern terminus of SR 100A
Kennebec	Benton	16.07	25.86	SR 11 north / SR 100 north (Bangor Road) – Clinton	Eastern end of SR 11 / SR 100 concurrency
Waldo	Unity	27.77	44.69	US 202 / SR 9 west (Main Street) – Albion	Western end of US 202 / SR 9 concurrency
Waldo	Unity	27.95	44.98	US 202 / SR 9 east (Main Street) – Bangor	Eastern end of US 202 / SR 9 concurrency
Waldo	Unity	28.64	46.09	SR 220 north (Thorndike Road) / Stagecoach Road – Troy	Western end of SR 220 concurrency
Waldo	Thorndike	32.16	51.76	SR 220 south (Mount View Road) – Liberty	Eastern end of SR 220 concurrency
Waldo	Brooks	39.78	64.02	Lang Hill Highway	Northern terminus of Lang Hill Highway, Formerly SR 203
Waldo	Brooks	41.24	66.37	SR 7 (Veterans Highway / Moosehead Trail) – Dixmont, Belfast	
Waldo	Monroe	48.39	77.88	SR 141 south (Swan Lake Avenue) / Jackson Road – Swanville, Belfast	Northern terminus of SR 141
Waldo	Winterport	56.57	91.04	SR 69 west (Lebanon Road) – Carmel	Western end of SR 69 concurrency
Waldo	Winterport	58.87	94.74	US 1A (Main Street) / SR 69 ends – Hampden, Bangor, Prospect	Eastern end of SR 69 concurrency
1.000 mi = 1.609 km; 1.000 km = 0.621 mi: Concurrency terminus
