= U.S. Route 201 =

U.S. Numbered Highway in Maine, United States

U.S. Route 201
- US 201 highlighted in red and US 201A in blue

Route information
- Auxiliary route of US 1
- Maintained by MaineDOT
- Length: 157.46 mi (253.41 km)
- Existed: 1926–present
- Tourist routes: Old Canada Road Scenic Byway

Major junctions
- South end: US 1 / SR 24 Bus. in Brunswick
- I-295 in Gardiner; I-95 in Fairfield; US 202 in Augusta; US 2 / US 201A / SR 104 in Skowhegan
- North end: SR 6 / R-173 at the Canadian border in Sandy Bay

Location
- Country: United States
- State: Maine
- Counties: Cumberland, Sagadahoc, Kennebec, Somerset

Highway system
- United States Numbered Highway System; List; Special; Divided; Maine State Highway System; Interstate; US; State; Auto trails; Lettered highways
← SR 200	→ US 202
← SR 146		→ SR 148
← Route 18	N.E.	→ Route 24

U.S. Route 201 (US 201) is part of the nationwide system of United States Numbered Highways. It runs for 157.46 miles (253.41 km) entirely within the state of Maine and is a spur route of U.S. Route 1. Its southern terminus is in Brunswick at US 1 and Maine State Route 24 Business. Its northern terminus is at the Canada–US border near Jackman (a terminus it shares with Maine State Route 6), where it connects to Quebec Route 173.

Between Solon and its northern terminus, US 201 is known as the Old Canada Road National Scenic Byway.

== Route description ==
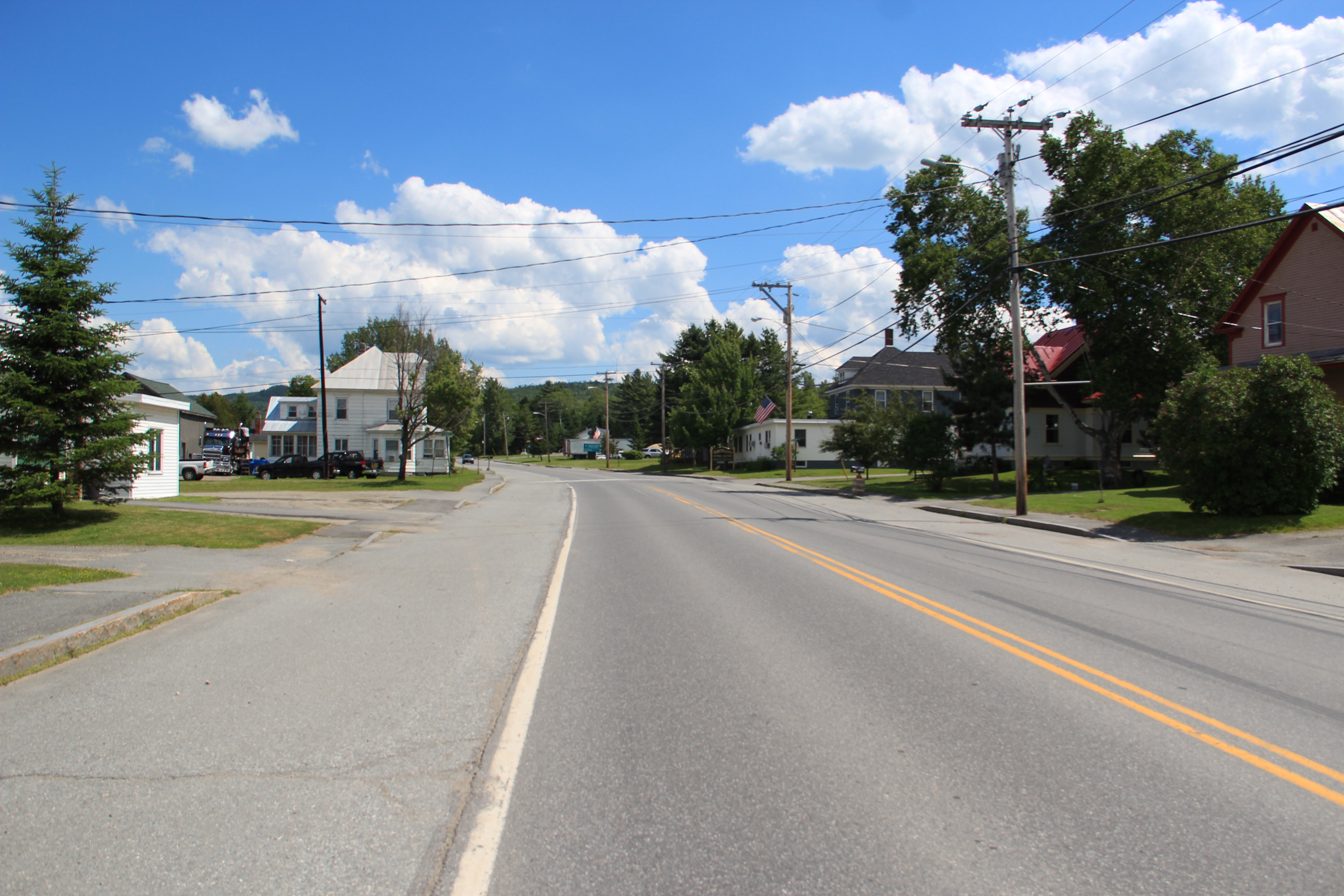
U.S. Route 201 in Jackman, Maine.

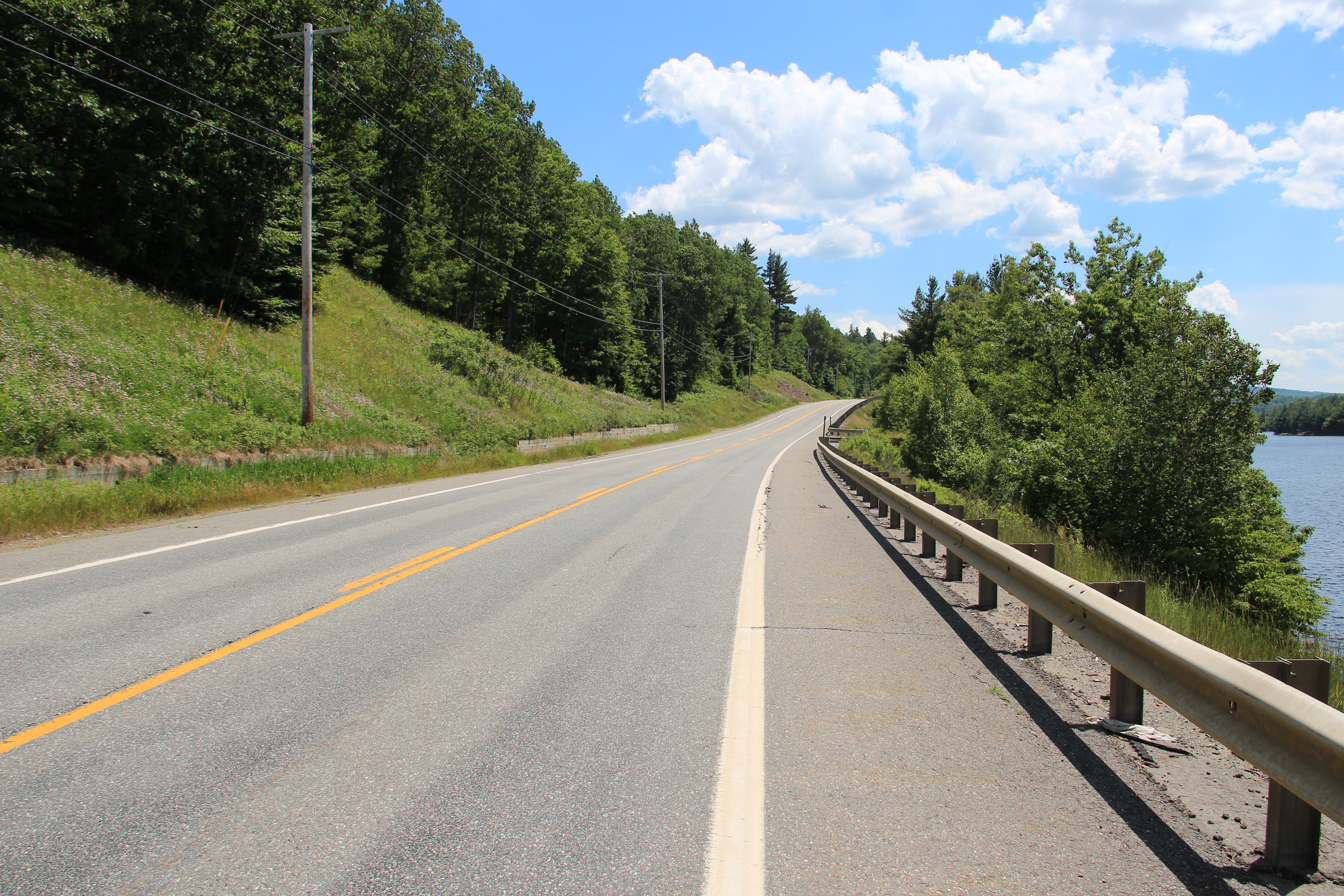
U.S. Route 201 near Bingham, Maine

US 201 begins in Brunswick along SR 24 Business (former SR 24) at an interchange with US 1. It follows the Kennebec River from Gardiner, to The Forks, where it winds away from the river and runs up into the north woods mountains. The highway crosses the Appalachian Trail at Caratunk.

North of The Forks, US 201 climbs in elevation over Johnson Mountain and around Coburn Mountain, near Upper Enchanted and Parlin Pond Townships. Before reaching Jackman, the road peaks at the Attean Pond Lookout, a popular rest area, before descending into town. US 201 intersects the northern end of SR 15 in Jackman and is cosigned with SR 6 for the remaining 16.4 miles (26.4 km) north to the Canadian border. The road continues through parts of Moose River and Dennistown before reaching the Armstrong–Jackman Border Crossing at Sandy Bay Township. US 201 and SR 6 ends as the highway crosses into Quebec, Canada and becomes Route 173.

A former alignment designated US 201A runs through the towns of Madison and Norridgewock.

== History ==
The New England Route 20 sign used for current US 201 in 1922

US 201 follows old river trading routes of the Abenaki people. Parts of Benedict Arnold's expedition to Quebec took place along the route that today make up US 201. On June 15, 2000, the route was designated a National Scenic Byway.

US 201 used to be New England Interstate Route 20 (NEI 20) in the 1920s. The original 1922 plan had NEI 20 starting in Portland. The southern half was later shifted east to start in Brunswick (the realignment may have been done prior to actual signing of the route.) The southern end of the original NEI 20 is now SR 100 from Portland to Augusta. The Brunswick end of the original NEI 20 intersected with NEI 1 (which is now US 1), which remained the southern terminus of US 201 until the construction of the US 1 freeway, at which point its terminus was moved to its current location on SR 24.

Since its designation in 1926, US 201 has only undergone one major realignment. The original highway used to run through Norridgewock, Anson, and Madison on its way to Solon. In 1954, US 201 was moved to a new eastern alignment which completely bypasses this area and the existing alignment was redesignated US 201A. US 201 has also undergone various other minor route adjustments, but largely maintains its original 1926 routing.

== Major intersections ==
County	Location	mi	km	Destinations	Notes
Cumberland	Brunswick	0.00	0.00	SR 24 Bus. south (Maine Street)	Continuation beyond southern terminus; southern end of concurrency with SR 24 Business
Cumberland	Brunswick	0.00	0.00	US 1 to I-95 – Portland, Bath	
Sagadahoc	Topsham	0.54	0.87	SR 24 Bus. north (Elm Street) – Bowdoinham	Northern end of concurrency with SR 24 Business
Sagadahoc	Topsham	1.35	2.17	SR 196 (Lewiston Road) to I-295 – Bath, Lewiston	
Sagadahoc	Bowdoin	6.87	11.06	SR 138 (Post Road) – Bowdoinham	Southern terminus of SR 138
Sagadahoc	Bowdoin	8.23	13.24	SR 125 north – Bowdoinham	Southern end of wrong-way concurrency with SR 125
Sagadahoc	Bowdoin	8.32	13.39	SR 125 south – Bowdoin, Lewiston	Northern end of wrong-way concurrency with SR 125
Sagadahoc	Richmond	14.08	22.66	SR 197 (Richmond Road) to I-295	
Sagadahoc	Richmond	14.33	23.06	SR 138 south (Lancaster Road)	Northern terminus of SR 138
Kennebec	Gardiner	20.14– 20.37	32.41– 32.78	I-295 to I-95 / Maine Turnpike – Brunswick, Portland, Augusta	Exit 49 on I-295
Kennebec	Gardiner	25.00	40.23	SR 9 west / SR 126 west (Water Street) – Lewiston	Southern end of concurrency with SR 9 / SR 126
Kennebec	Gardiner	25.27	40.67	SR 9 east / SR 126 east / SR 27 south – USVA Togus, Randolph; SR 24 – Richmond	Northern end of concurrency with SR 9 / SR 126; southern end of concurrency with SR 27; Northern terminus of SR 24
Kennebec	Augusta	31.09	50.03	US 202 west / SR 11 south / SR 17 west / SR 100 south to I-95 – Winthrop SR 8 north / SR 11 north / SR 27 north – Belgrade	Rotary; northern end of concurrency with SR 27; southern end of concurrency with US 202 / SR 17 / SR 100; Southern terminus of SR 8
Kennebec	Augusta	31.82	51.21	SR 9 west / SR 17 east (Stone Street) – Randolph, Rockland SR 105 east (Cony Street East) – Windsor	Rotary; eastern end of concurrency with SR 17; western end of concurrency with SR 9; western terminus of SR 105
Kennebec	Augusta	32.44	52.21	US 202 east / SR 9 east (North Belfast Avenue) – China	Northern end of concurrency with US 202 / SR 9
Kennebec	Augusta	33.12	53.30	SR 3 to I-95 / Maine Turnpike – Augusta Civic Center Drive, Portland, Belfast	
Kennebec	Winslow	48.30	77.73	SR 137 (Carter Memorial Drive) to I-95 – Kennedy Memorial Drive, Oakland, China	
Kennebec	Winslow	49.24	79.24	SR 137 Bus. – China	Southern end of concurrency with SR 137 Bus.
Kennebec	Winslow	49.37	79.45	SR 100A (Halifax Street) – Clinton, Burnham	Southern terminus of SR 100A
Kennebec	Waterville	50.04	80.53	SR 137 Bus. (Spring Street) to I-95 – Oakland	Northern end of concurrency with SR 137 Bus.
Kennebec	Waterville	50.49	81.26	SR 11 south (Main Street) / SR 104 – Oakland, Sidney	Southern end of concurrency with SR 11
Somerset	Fairfield	53.55	86.18	SR 11 north / SR 100 north / SR 139 east	Northern end of concurrency with SR 11 / SR 100; southern end of concurrency with SR 139
Somerset	Fairfield	53.77	86.53	SR 139 west (Western Avenue) – Norridgewock	Northern end of concurrency with SR 139
Somerset	Fairfield	54.45– 54.72	87.63– 88.06	I-95 – Bangor, Augusta	Exit 133 on I-95
Somerset	Fairfield	58.70	94.47	SR 23 south – Oakland	Southern end of concurrency with SR 23
Somerset	Fairfield	61.09	98.31	SR 23 north – Canaan	Northern end of concurrency with SR 23
Somerset	Skowhegan	68.88	110.85	US 2 west / US 201A (West Front Street) – Norridgewock; SR 104 – Fairfield Center	Southern end of concurrency with US 2; northern terminus of SR 104; southern terminus of US 201A
Somerset	Skowhegan	69.25	111.45	US 2 east	Northern end of concurrency with US 2
Somerset	Madison	73.55	118.37	SR 148 (White School House Road) – Madison	Eastern terminus of SR 148
Somerset	Madison	79.22– 79.27	127.49– 127.57	SR 43 (Thurston Hill Road / Horsetail Hill Road) – Athens, Madison	Brief concurrency with SR 43
Somerset	Solon	84.31	135.68	US 201A (Ferry Street) / SR 8 – North Anson, Madison	Northern terminus of US 201A / SR 8
Somerset	Bingham	92.11	148.24	SR 16 west	Southern end of concurrency with SR 16
Somerset	Bingham	92.75	149.27	SR 16 east – Abbot	Northern end of concurrency with SR 16
Somerset	Jackman	140.96	226.85	SR 6 east / SR 15 – Rockwood, Greenville	Southern end of concurrency with SR 6; northern terminus of SR 15
Somerset	Sandy Bay	157.37	253.26	SR 6 ends	Northern end of concurrency with SR 6; western terminus of SR 6
Somerset	Sandy Bay	157.37	253.26	R-173 north to A-73 – Saint-Georges, Québec	Continuation beyond Armstrong–Jackman Border Crossing into Québec
1.000 mi = 1.609 km; 1.000 km = 0.621 mi: Concurrency terminus

== Somerset County Alternate route ==
U.S. Route 201A
- Location: Skowhegan - Solon
- Length: 26.18 mi (42.13 km)
- Existed: 1954–present

U.S. Route 201 Alternate (US 201A) is the designation of a former alignment of US 201 in the towns of Skowhegan, Norridgewock, Madison and Anson. The route is 26.18 miles (42.13 km) long and forms a western loop of US 201, which was rerouted in 1954 to bypass to the east. US 201A runs along the Kennebec River over its entire length.

The southern terminus of US 201A is at US 2, US 201 and State Route 104 in Skowhegan. The northern terminus is at US 201 in Solon, a terminus it shares with State Route 8.

US 201A is also part of the Arnold Highway (named for Benedict Arnold), established in 1931 over the original US 201.

US 201A is completely overlapped with other routes due to various realignments of the routes signed over it.

=== Route description ===
US 201A begins in Skowhegan just south of the Kennebec River, at an intersection with US 2, US 201, and SR 104 (which has its northern terminus here). US 201A begins overlapped with US 2 and the two routes proceed southwest along the southern bank of the river on the way to Norridgewock. Upon reaching town, the highway intersects with SR 8 and SR 139. SR 139 has its western terminus at this intersection while SR 8 northbound joins the concurrency. Just to the west, US 2 splits off to the southwest, while US 201A goes to the northwest with SR 8 in tow. US 201A and SR 8 are cosigned for the remainder of their lengths.

US 201A and SR 8 continue along the riverbank, turning north into Madison and intersecting with SR 43 and SR 148. US 201A and SR 8 then turn west, joining the converging routes to cross the river as a four-route concurrency. On the west side of the bridge lies the town of Anson, where US 201A and SR 8 split to the north off SR 43 and SR 148, which continue west concurrently. The highway turns north along the west bank of the river into the village of North Anson, intersecting the eastern end of SR 234 before meeting SR 16 just to the north. SR 16 joins US 201A and SR 8, proceeding north along the river out of town, and eventually passing into Solon. Nearing the riverbank once more, SR 16 splits to continue north along the river, while US 201A and SR 8 turn northeast to cross the river. Both routes terminate at US 201.

=== Junction list ===
The entire route is in Somerset County.

Location	mi	km	Destinations	Notes
Skowhegan	0.00	0.00	US 2 east / US 201 / SR 104	Southern end of concurrency with US 2; northern terminus of SR 104
Norridgewock	5.02	8.08	SR 139 east (Waterville Road) – Waterville	Western terminus of SR 139
Norridgewock	5.04	8.11	SR 8 south (Mechanic Street) – Smithfield	Southern end of concurrency with SR 8
Norridgewock	5.42	8.72	US 2 west – Mercer, Farmington	Northern end of concurrency with US 2
Madison	13.12	21.11	SR 43 north (Weston Avenue) / SR 148 east (Main Street) – Athens, East Madison, Skowhegan	Southern end of concurrency with SR 43 / SR 148
Anson	13.60	21.89	SR 43 south / SR 148 west – Farmington, Starks	Northern end of concurrency with SR 43 / SR 148
Anson	18.07	29.08	SR 234 west (Union Street) – New Vineyard	Eastern terminus of SR 234
Anson	18.25	29.37	SR 16 west – Kingfield, New Portland	Southern end of concurrency with SR 16
Embden	25.03	40.28	SR 16 east (Kennebec River Road) – Bingham, Concord	Northern end of concurrency with SR 16
Solon	26.16	42.10	US 201 (Main Street) / SR 8 ends – Skowhegan, Bingham	Northern terminus of US 201A and SR 8; north end of concurrency with SR 8
1.000 mi = 1.609 km; 1.000 km = 0.621 mi: Concurrency terminus
