= Maine State Route 137 =

East-west state highway in Maine, US

State Route 137
- SR 137 in red, SR 137 Bus. in green

Route information
- Maintained by MaineDOT
- Length: 56.25 mi (90.53 km)
- Existed: 1925, 1997 (current alignment)–present

Major junctions
- West end: US 2 in Mercer
- SR 8 / SR 225 in Smithfield; SR 11 / SR 23 in Oakland; I-95 in Waterville; SR 11 / SR 104 in Waterville; US 201 / SR 100 in Winslow; US 202 / SR 9 in China/Albion
- East end: US 1 / SR 3 / SR 7 in Belfast

Location
- Country: United States
- State: Maine
- Counties: Somerset, Kennebec, Waldo

Highway system
- Maine State Highway System; Interstate; US; State; Auto trails; Lettered highways
← SR 136	→ SR 138

State Route 137 (SR 137) is a route that runs for 56.25 miles (90.53 km) west to east that begins at the intersection of U.S. Route 2 (US 2) in Mercer and covers a large expanse of land, ending in the city of Belfast at an interchange with US 1 and SR 3.

SR 137 is the main road in the communities of Smithfield and Oakland, near the western terminus of the route. SR 137 bypasses the downtown area of Waterville while SR 137 Business travels directly through it.

East of Waterville and Winslow, it meets US 202 and SR 9 in the town of China where they form a concurrency along one road until an intersection in the town of Albion. At this intersection, SR 137 becomes known as Belfast Road. Next, SR 137 crosses through the towns of Freedom and Knox meeting SR 220 at Knox Corner. In Morrill, SR 137 crosses SR 131 at an intersection. Eventually, at the end of the route, SR 137 merges with SR 7, and both end at US 1 and SR 3 in Belfast.

== Major junctions ==
County	Location	mi	km	Destinations	Notes
Somerset	Mercer	0.00	0.00	US 2 / Brown Road – Farmington, Norridgewock	
Somerset	Smithfield	4.62	7.44	SR 8 north (Village Road) – Norridgewock	Western end of SR 8 concurrency
Somerset	Smithfield	7.84	12.62	SR 225 west (Rome Road) – Rome	Eastern terminus of SR 225
Somerset	Smithfield	7.91	12.73	SR 8 south (Smithfield Road) – Belgrade	Eastern end of SR 8 concurrency
Kennebec	Oakland	14.31	23.03	SR 11 south (Church Street) – Belgrade	Western end of SR 11 concurrency
Kennebec	Oakland	14.58	23.46	SR 23 south (Water Street) – Sidney	Western end of SR 23 concurrency
Kennebec	Oakland	14.61	23.51	SR 23 north (Fairfield Street) / Pleasant Street – Fairfield Center	Eastern end of SR 23 concurrency
Kennebec	Waterville	16.28– 16.42	26.20– 26.43	I-95 – Augusta, Bangor	Exit 127 (I-95)
Kennebec	Waterville	17.94	28.87	SR 104 south (West River Road)	Western end of SR 104 concurrency
Kennebec	Waterville	18.00	28.97	SR 11 north / SR 104 north / SR 137 Bus. east (Silver Street) – Downtown Waterville, Winslow	Eastern end of SR 11 / SR 104 concurrencies; western terminus of SR 137 Bus.
Kennebec	Winslow	19.12	30.77	US 201 / SR 100 (Augusta Road) – Winslow, Augusta	
Kennebec	Winslow	19.56	31.48	SR 32 (Cushman Road) – Vassalboro	
Kennebec	Winslow	20.32	32.70	SR 137 Bus. west (China Road) – Winslow, Downtown Waterville	Eastern terminus of SR 137 Bus.
Kennebec	China	26.48	42.62	US 202 / SR 9 west (Lakeview Drive) / Main Street – South China, China Village	Western end of US 202 concurrency
Kennebec	Albion	33.83	54.44	US 202 (Unity Road) / SR 9 east – Unity, Bangor	Eastern end of US 202 concurrency
Waldo	Knox	41.11	66.16	SR 220 (Knox Ridge Road) – Thorndike, Liberty	
Waldo	Waldo	49.27	79.29	SR 131 (Waldo Station Road) – Swanville, Morrill	
Waldo	Belfast	53.73	86.47	SR 7 north (Head of the Tide Road) – Brooks	Western end of SR 7 concurrency
Waldo	Belfast	56.15– 56.25	90.36– 90.53	US 1 south / SR 3 west / SR 7 ends / Waldo Avenue – Rockland, Augusta	Interchange, access from US 1 / SR 3 northbound and to US 1 / SR 3 southbound only; eastern end of SR 7 concurrency
1.000 mi = 1.609 km; 1.000 km = 0.621 mi: Concurrency terminus

== Business route ==
State Route 137 Business
- Location: Waterville–Winslow
- Length: 3.05 mi (4.91 km)
- Existed: 1997–present

State Route 137 Business (SR 137 Bus.) is a business route through the towns of Waterville and Winslow. SR 137 goes through the city, but it does not go into the downtown area as SR 137 Bus. does.

SR 137 Business was designated in 1997 after SR 137 was moved onto its bypass of Downtown Waterville and Winslow.

Major junctions

The entire route is in Kennebec County.

Location	mi	km	Destinations	Notes
Waterville	0.00	0.00	SR 11 south / SR 104 south / SR 137 west (Kennedy Memorial Drive / Carter Memorial Drive) to I-95 – Oakland, Smithfield, China	Western end of SR 11 / SR 104 concurrency
Waterville	0.72	1.16	SR 11 north / SR 104 north (Elm Street) – Fairfield	Eastern end of SR 11 / SR 104 concurrency
Waterville	1.16	1.87	US 201 / SR 100 south (Main Street) / Water Street	Western end of US 201 southbound concurrency
Waterville	1.21	1.95	US 201 / SR 100 north (Front Street) to I-95 north – Fairfield	Western end of US 201 northbound concurrency
Winslow	1.88	3.03	SR 100A north (Halifax Street) – Clinton, Burnham	Southern terminus of SR 100A
Winslow	2.01	3.23	US 201 / SR 100 south (Augusta Road) – Augusta	Eastern end of US 201 concurrency
Winslow	2.11	3.40	SR 32 south (Cushman Road) – North Vassalboro, South China	Northern terminus of SR 32
Winslow	3.05	4.91	SR 137 (China Road / Carter Memorial Drive)	
1.000 mi = 1.609 km; 1.000 km = 0.621 mi: Concurrency terminus
