= Maine State Route 7 =

State highway in Kennebec, Waldo, and Hancock counties in Maine, US

State Route 7
- Route of SR 7 highlighted in red

Route information
- Maintained by MaineDOT
- Length: 61.89 mi (99.60 km)
- Existed: 1949 (current alignment)–present

Major junctions
- South end: US 1 / SR 3 / SR 137 in Belfast
- US 202 / SR 9 in Dixmont; I-95 in Newport; US 2 / SR 11 / SR 100 in Newport
- North end: SR 15 in Dover-Foxcroft

Location
- Country: United States
- State: Maine
- Counties: Waldo, Penobscot, Piscataquis

Highway system
- Maine State Highway System; Interstate; US; State; Auto trails; Lettered highways
| ← SR 6 | → SR 8 |

State Route 7 (SR 7) is part of Maine's system of numbered state highways, running from an interchange with U.S. Route 1 (US 1) in Belfast, to an intersection with SR 15 in Dover-Foxcroft. Route 7 is 61.9 miles (99.6 km) long.

Between Belfast and Newport, SR 7 is known as the Moosehead Trail. SR 7 follows the east bank of the Sebasticook River between Newport and Dexter, where it turns northeast to Dover-Foxcroft.

== Junction list ==
| County | Location | mi | km | Destinations | Notes |
|---|---|---|---|---|---|
| Waldo | Belfast | 0.0 | 0.0 | US 1 / SR 3 – Rockland, Augusta, Bucksport, Bar Harbor; SR 137 | Southern terminus of SR 7/137 |
| Waldo | Belfast | 2.5 | 4.0 | SR 137 north (Waterville Road) – Knox, Freedom | Northern terminus of concurrency |
| Waldo | Waldo | 6.6 | 10.6 | SR 131 (Waldo Station Road) – Morrill, Waldo | |
| Waldo | Brooks | 11.1 | 17.9 | SR 139 (Brooks Road) – Thorndike, Monroe | |
| Penobscot | Dixmont | 20.5 | 33.0 | US 202 / SR 9 – Unity, Bangor | |
| Penobscot | Plymouth | 27.3 | 43.9 | SR 69 (Lower Detroit Road) – Pittsfield, Carmel | |
| Penobscot | Plymouth | 29.8 | 48.0 | I-95 – Augusta, Bangor | Exit 161 (I-95) |
| Penobscot | Newport | 31.2 | 50.2 | US 2 east / SR 100 north (Elm Street) – Bangor | Eastern terminus of US 2/SR 7/100 concurrency |
| Penobscot | Newport | 34.7 | 55.8 | US 2 west (Main Street) – Skowhegan SR 11 / SR 100 south to I-95 (Oxbow Road) – Pittsfield | Rotary; western terminus of US 2/SR 7/100 concurrency Southern terminus of SR 7/11 concurrency |
| Penobscot | Corinna | 40.8 | 65.7 | SR 43 west (St. Albans Road) – St. Albans SR 11 north / SR 43 east (Exeter Road) – Exeter; SR 222 (Stetson Road) – Stetson | Northern terminus of SR 7/11 concurrency Western terminus of SR 222 |
| Penobscot | Dexter | 47.8 | 76.9 | SR 94 (Garland Road) – Garland | Western terminus of SR 94 |
| Penobscot | Dexter | 48.8 | 78.5 | SR 23 south (Main Street) – Ripley | Southern terminus of concurrency |
| Penobscot | Dexter | 49.0 | 78.9 | SR 23 north (Grove Street) – Guilford, Greenville | Northern terminus of concurrency |
| Piscataquis | Dover-Foxcroft | 61.9 | 99.6 | SR 15 to SR 6 / SR 16 / SR 153 (East Main Street) | Northern terminus of SR 7 |
1.000 mi = 1.609 km; 1.000 km = 0.621 mi: Concurrency terminus
