= Maine State Route 100 =

Highway in Maine

State Route 100
- Route of SR 100 highlighted in red, SR 100A in blue

Route information
- Maintained by MaineDOT
- Length: 139.93 mi (225.20 km)
- Existed: 1925, 1934 (current routing)–present

Major junctions
- South end: Forest Avenue / Cumberland Avenue in Portland
- I-295 / US 1 / US 302 in Portland; I-95 / Maine Turnpike in Falmouth, Auburn and Augusta; US 202 / SR 4 / SR 26 in Gray; US 201 / SR 8 / SR 11 / SR 27 in Augusta; US 201 in Fairfield; I-95 in Palmyra; US 2 / SR 7 / SR 11 in Newport; I-95 / I-395 / SR 15 in Bangor
- North end: US 2 in Bangor

Location
- Country: United States
- State: Maine
- Counties: Cumberland, Androscoggin, Kennebec, Waldo, Somerset, Penobscot

Highway system
- Maine State Highway System; Interstate; US; State; Auto trails; Lettered highways
← SR 99	→ SR 101

State Route 100 (SR 100) is a state highway in the U.S. state of Maine, running from Portland to Bangor.

The south end of SR 100 is at the intersection of Forest Avenue and Cumberland Avenue in downtown Portland. Its north end is at the intersection of Hammond Street, Main Street, State Street and Central Street in downtown Bangor; SR 100 runs along Hammond Street with U.S. Route 2 (US 2) which continues across Main Street/Central Street onto State Street.

The majority of SR 100 is concurrent with other routes: US 302 from downtown Portland to northern Portland, SR 26 from northern Portland to Gray, US 202 from Gray to Augusta, US 201 from Augusta to Fairfield, SR 11 from Fairfield to Newport, and US 2 from Newport to downtown Bangor. The only parts of SR 100 that do not run along another route are in Portland, first (as Forest Avenue) between its southern terminus and the Interstate 295/US 1 interchange (where US 302 begins) and between US 302 and SR 26 where it is alone on a small piece of Allen Avenue.

== Major junctions ==
County	Location	mi	km	Destinations	Notes
Cumberland	Portland	0.00	0.00	Cumberland Avenue / Forest Avenue	
Cumberland	Portland	0.39– 0.60	0.63– 0.97	I-295 / US 1 / US 302 begins – Falmouth, South Portland	Exit 6 on I-295; southern end of US 302 concurrency
Cumberland	Portland	1.45	2.33	SR 9 west (Woodford Street) / Deering Avenue	Southern end of SR 9 concurrency
Cumberland	Portland	1.54	2.48	SR 9 east (Ocean Avenue) / Saunders Street	Northern end of SR 9 concurrency
Cumberland	Portland	2.79	4.49	US 302 west (Forest Avenue) – Westbrook	Northern end of US 302 concurrency
Cumberland	Portland	3.62	5.83	SR 26 south (Washington Avenue) / Allen Avenue – Falmouth	Southern end of SR 26 concurrency
Cumberland	Falmouth	5.95– 6.00	9.58– 9.66	I-95 / Maine Turnpike – Kittery, Boston, Old Orchard Beach, Lewiston, Augusta	Exit 53 on I-95 / Turnpike
Cumberland	Gray	16.74– 16.77	26.94– 26.99	US 202 west / SR 4 south / SR 115 / SR 26A north (Gray Road / Yarmouth Road) to I-95 / Maine Turnpike – Windham	Southern end of US 202 / SR 4 concurrency; southern terminus of SR 26A
Cumberland	Gray	16.79	27.02	SR 26 north (Shaker Road) – Norway	Northern end of SR 26 concurrency
Cumberland	New Gloucester	24.36	39.20	SR 231 south (Intervale Road) / Bald Hill Road – New Gloucester	Northern terminus of SR 231
Androscoggin	Auburn	27.01	43.47	SR 122 west (Poland Spring Road) / Moose Brook Road – Poland	Eastern terminus of SR 122
Androscoggin	Auburn	27.99– 28.13	45.05– 45.27	I-95 / Maine Turnpike – Portland, Boston, Lewiston, Augusta	Exit 75 on I-95 / Turnpike
Androscoggin	Auburn	32.08– 32.13	51.63– 51.71	SR 11 south / SR 121 west (Minot Avenue) – Minot, Mechanic Falls	Southern end of SR 11 concurrency; eastern terminus of SR 121; access from southbound US 202 / SR 4 only
Androscoggin	Auburn	32.77	52.74	SR 4 north (Union Street) / Court Street – Farmington	Northern end of SR 4 concurrency
Androscoggin	Auburn	33.04	53.17	SR 136 south (Mechanics Row) / Turner Street	Northern terminus of SR 136 (southbound direction of SR 136)
Androscoggin	Auburn	33.11	53.29	SR 136 (Main Street) / Great Falls Plaza	Northern terminus of SR 136 (northbound direction of SR 136)
Androscoggin	Lewiston	33.45– 33.47	53.83– 53.86	SR 196 south (Canal Street) to I-95 / Maine Turnpike – Lisbon, Brunswick	Northern terminus of SR 196 (southbound direction of SR 136)
Androscoggin	Lewiston	33.49	53.90	SR 196 (Lisbon Street) / Chapel Street Alley	Northern terminus of SR 196 (northbound direction of SR 136)
Androscoggin	Lewiston	33.67– 33.70	54.19– 54.23	SR 126 east (Sabattus Street) – Sabattus	Western terminus of SR 126
Androscoggin	Lewiston	34.53– 34.61	55.57– 55.70	Russell Street - To SR 196 / SR 126 – Lisbon, Auburn	Interchange
Androscoggin	Leeds	45.45	73.14	SR 106 north	Southern terminus of SR 106
Kennebec	Monmouth	49.55	79.74	SR 132 south (Main Street) / Blaisdell Road – Monmouth	Northern terminus of SR 132
Kennebec	Winthrop	52.71– 52.98	84.83– 85.26	SR 41 / SR 133 north (Western Avenue) – Readfield, Downtown Winthrop, Wayne	Interchange; southern termini of SR 41 / SR 133
Kennebec	Winthrop	55.96	90.06	SR 135 north (Stanley Road) – Readfield, Belgrade	
Kennebec	Winthrop	56.08	90.25	SR 135 south (Winthrop Center Road) – East Monmouth	
Kennebec	Manchester	59.31	95.45	SR 17 west (Readfield Road) / Pond Road – Readfield, Litchfield	Southern end of SR 17 concurrency
Kennebec	Augusta	61.89– 62.14	99.60– 100.00	I-95 / Maine Turnpike south – Portland, Bangor	Northern terminus of Maine Turnpike; exit 109 on I-95 / Turnpike
Kennebec	Augusta	63.62– 63.67	102.39– 102.47	US 201 south / SR 8 north / SR 11 north / SR 27 (State Street) – Gardiner, Belgrade	Memorial Circle; southern end of US 201 concurrency; northern end of SR 11 concurrency; southern terminus of SR 8
Kennebec River		63.93– 64.30	102.89– 103.48	Memorial Bridge	
Kennebec	Augusta	64.35– 64.44	103.56– 103.71	SR 9 west / SR 17 east (Stone Street) / SR 105 east to SR 27 (Cony Street) – Downtown Augusta	Cony Circle; northern end of SR 17 concurrency; southern end of SR 9 concurrency; western terminus of SR 105
Kennebec	Augusta	65.01– 65.03	104.62– 104.66	US 202 east (North Belfast Avenue) / SR 9 east – China	Northern end of US 202 / SR 9 concurrency
Kennebec	Augusta	65.67– 65.69	105.69– 105.72	SR 3 to I-95 – Augusta Civic Center Drive, Portland, Belfast	
Kennebec	Winslow	80.87	130.15	SR 137 (Carter Memorial Drive) – Oakland, China	
Kennebec	Winslow	81.81	131.66	SR 137 Bus. east (China Road) – China	Southern end of SR 137 Bus. concurrency
Kennebec	Winslow	81.94	131.87	SR 100A north (Halifax Street) – Clinton, Burnham	Southern terminus of SR 100A
Kennebec	Waterville	82.61– 82.67	132.95– 133.04	SR 137 Bus. west (Spring Street) to Water Street south / I-95 – Oakland	Northern end of SR 137 Bus. concurrency
Kennebec	Waterville	83.06	133.67	SR 11 south / SR 104 (Elm Street / Main Street) – Oakland, Sidney	Southern end of SR 11 concurrency; intersection with SR 104 in southbound lanes only
Somerset	Fairfield	86.10– 86.14	138.56– 138.63	US 201 north / SR 139 west (Upper Main Street) to Lawrence Avenue / I-95	Northern end of US 201 concurrency; southern end of SR 139 concurrency
Kennebec	Benton	88.25– 88.28	142.02– 142.07	SR 100A south (Clinton Avenue) – Winslow	Northern terminus of SR 100A
Kennebec	Benton	88.33	142.15	SR 139 east (Sebasticook Bridge Road) – Albion, Unity	Northern end of SR 139 concurrency
Waldo	No major junctions				
Somerset	Pittsfield	105.54	169.85	SR 69 east (Hunnewell Avenue) – Detroit	Western terminus of SR 69
Somerset	Pittsfield	105.61	169.96	SR 152 north (Somerset Avenue) to I-95 – Hartland	Southern terminus of SR 152
Somerset	Palmyra	109.59	176.37	SR 220 south (Main Street) – Detroit	Northern terminus of SR 220
Somerset	Palmyra	111.78– 112.07	179.89– 180.36	I-95 – Bangor, Waterville	Exit 157 (I-95)
Penobscot	Newport	112.27– 112.37	180.68– 180.84	US 2 west (Main Street) / SR 7 north / SR 11 north (Moosehead Trail) – Skowhegan, Sugarloaf, Dexter	Roundabout; southern end of US 2 / SR 7 concurrencies; northern end of SR 11 concurrency
Penobscot	Newport	115.86	186.46	SR 7 south (Roussin Road) to Stetson Road / I-95 – Dixmont, Plymouth	Northern end of SR 7 concurrency
Penobscot	Etna	121.44	195.44	SR 143 (Lakins Road / Dixmont Road) – Stetson, Dixmont	
Penobscot	Carmel	124.71	200.70	SR 69 (Plymouth Road / Hampden Road) to I-95 – Winterport	
Penobscot	Bangor	137.19– 137.30	220.79– 220.96	I-395 east to I-95 / SR 15 / Odlin Road – Newport, Orono, Bangor, Brewer	Western terminus and exits 1A-B on I-395; cloverleaf interchange
Penobscot	Bangor	138.28– 138.43	222.54– 222.78	I-95 / SR 15 – Newport, Augusta, Orono, Houlton	Exit 183 on I-95
Penobscot	Bangor	139.62	224.70	SR 222 west (Union Street)	Eastern terminus of SR 222
Penobscot	Bangor	139.93	225.20	US 2 east (State Street) / Central Street / Main Street	
1.000 mi = 1.609 km; 1.000 km = 0.621 mi

== Alternate route ==
State Route 100A
- Location: Winslow–Benton
- Length: 5.16 mi (8.30 km)
- Existed: 1954–present

State Route 100A (SR 100A) is a 5.2-mile (8.4 km) alternate route of SR 100 running between the towns of Winslow and Benton.

Route 100A's alignment was formerly part of SR 32, before SR 32 was truncated in 1954 to end at SR 137 Business, near its intersection with US 201/SR 100 just south of SR 100A's current terminus. The old alignment, which connected to SR 100 at both ends, was redesignated as SR 100A (as a bypass of SR 100's alignment in Winslow and Benton).
