= Maine State Route 23 =

State highway in Maine, US

State Route 23

Route information
- Maintained by MaineDOT
- Length: 68.09 mi (109.58 km)
- Existed: 1954–present

Major junctions
- South end: SR 8 / SR 11 / SR 27 in Sidney
- SR 11 / SR 137 in Oakland; US 201 in Fairfield; US 2 in Canaan
- North end: SR 6 / SR 15 / SR 16 in Guilford

Location
- Country: United States
- State: Maine
- Counties: Kennebec, Somerset, Penobscot, Piscataquis

Highway system
- Maine State Highway System; Interstate; US; State; Auto trails; Lettered highways
| ← SR 22 | → SR 24 |

State Route 23 (abbreviated SR 23) is part of Maine's system of numbered state highways, running 68.09 miles (109.58 km) from Sidney to Guilford. It is located in the south-central part of the state, running from southwest to northeast, roughly parallel to Interstate 95 for its entire length.

== Route description ==
SR 23 begins in Sidney at Belgrade Road, which carries SR 8, SR 11 and SR 27. It runs northward along the eastern side of Messalonskee Lake into the town of Oakland, where it rejoins SR 11 and cuts through downtown. SR 11 splits off to join SR 137 eastward towards I-95 and Waterville, while SR 23 continues northward, paralleling the Interstate highway as it crosses into Fairfield. SR 23 crosses over SR 104 and SR 139 as it approaches the Kennebec River, where it intersects with US 201. The two routes overlap northward for just over two miles into the northwestern corner of the town before SR 23 splits off to the northwest and crosses the river into Canaan. The road passes through the center of town, briefly overlapping with US 2 and then enters Hartland where it meets SR 43, SR 151, and SR 152. SR 23 joins SR 43 and SR 152, crossing shortly thereafter into St. Albans where SR 43 departs to the east. SR 23 and SR 152 continue northward into the small town of Ripley. SR 23 splits off of SR 152 and joins SR 154 eastbound towards Dexter. SR 154 abruptly ends after two miles, though, at the intersection with Water Street. (SR 23 had once followed a different route between the centers of St. Albans and Ripley, continuing to follow SR 43 for two miles after the latter's departure from SR 152, then following a series of roads, the last being Water Street, to the east end of SR 154 where the same road that was SR 154 continued as SR 23. SR 23 was rerouted to follow existing state routes when the section of the former SR 23 between SR 43 and SR 154 was downgraded to being local roads, but that intersection with Water Street remained the east end of SR 154.) SR 23 continues into Dexter and briefly overlaps SR 7 before turning due north. SR 23 enters the town of Guilford and ends at the intersection with Water Street (SR 6, SR 15 and SR 16) east of downtown.

== History ==
SR 23 was formed from a previous alignment of SR 24, which included most of its current routing as well as a section between Gardiner and Sidney now covered by other routes. In 1954, the northern terminus of SR 24 was truncated to its current location in Gardiner. The SR 24 designation was dropped between Gardiner and Sidney, and the northern section was renumbered to SR 23.

== Major intersections ==
| County | Location | mi | km | Destinations | Notes |
|---|---|---|---|---|---|
| Kennebec | Sidney | 0.0 | 0.0 | SR 8 / SR 11 / SR 27 (Belgrade Road) – Augusta, Belgrade | Southern terminus |
| Kennebec | Oakland | 11.3 | 18.2 | SR 11 south (Belgrade Road) – Belgrade | Southern end of concurrency with SR 11 |
| Kennebec | Oakland | 12.1 | 19.5 | SR 11 north / SR 137 (Pleasant Street/Kennedy Memorial Drive) – Smithfield, Rome | Northern end of concurrency with SR 11 |
| Somerset | Fairfield | 17.0 | 27.4 | SR 104 / SR 139 (Norridgewock Road/Pung Hill Road) – Skowhegan, Norridgewock, Waterville | |
| Somerset | Fairfield | 21.0 | 33.8 | US 201 south (Skowhegan Road) – Fairfield | Southern end of concurrency with US 201 |
| Somerset | Fairfield | 23.3 | 37.5 | US 201 north (Waterville Road) – Skowhegan, Bingham | Northern end of concurrency with US 201 |
| Somerset | Canaan | 30.4 | 48.9 | US 2 west (Canaan Road) – Skowhegan, Norridgewock | Southern end of concurrency with US 2 |
| Somerset | Canaan | 30.9 | 49.7 | US 2 east (Main Street) – Palmyra, Newport | Northern end of concurrency with US 2 |
| Somerset | Hartland | 41.3 | 66.5 | SR 43 west / SR 151 north (Pleasant Street) – Athens, Solon | Southern end of concurrency with SR 43 / SR 151 |
| Somerset | Hartland | 41.4 | 66.6 | SR 152 south (Pittsfield Avenue) – Palmyra, Pittsfield | Southern end of concurrency with SR 152 |
| Somerset | Hartland | 41.6 | 66.9 | SR 151 south (Elm Street) – Palmyra | Northern end of concurrency with SR 151 |
| Somerset | St. Albans | 44.4 | 71.5 | SR 43 east (Corinna Road) – Corinna, Exeter | Northern end of concurrency with SR 43 |
| Somerset | Ripley | 49.6 | 79.8 | SR 152 north / SR 154 west (Stream Road) – Harmony, Cambridge | Northern end of concurrency with SR 152; southern end of concurrency with SR 154 |
| Somerset | Ripley | 52.3 | 84.2 | SR 154 / Water Street | Eastern terminus of SR 154 |
| Penobscot | Dexter | 57.2 | 92.1 | SR 7 south (Spring Street) to SR 94 – Corinna, Garland | Southern end of concurrency with SR 7 |
| Penobscot | Dexter | 57.4 | 92.4 | SR 7 north (Church Street) – Dover-Foxcroft | Northern end of concurrency with SR 7 |
| Piscataquis | Guilford | 68.1 | 109.6 | SR 6 / SR 15 / SR 16 (Water Street) to SR 150 – Guilford, Dover-Foxcroft | Northern terminus |
1.000 mi = 1.609 km; 1.000 km = 0.621 mi: Concurrency terminus
