= Maine State Route 6 =

East-west state highway in Maine, US

State Route 6
- Route of SR 6 highlighted in red

Route information
- Maintained by MaineDOT
- Length: 207.23 mi (333.50 km)
- Existed: 1949–present

Major junctions
- West end: US 201 / R-173 at the Canadian border in Sandy Bay
- US 201 / SR 15 in Jackman; SR 16 in Abbott; SR 15 in Dover-Foxcroft; SR 11 in Milo; SR 16 / SR 155 in LaGrange; I-95 in Enfield; US 2 / SR 155 in Enfield/Lincoln; US 1 in Topsfield
- East end: Route 4 at the Canadian border in Vanceboro

Location
- Country: United States
- State: Maine
- Counties: Somerset, Piscataquis, Penobscot, Washington

Highway system
- Maine State Highway System; Interstate; US; State; Auto trails; Lettered highways
← SR 5	→ SR 7

State Route 6 (SR 6) is part of Maine's system of numbered state highways, running from west to east across the state. Its western terminus is at the Canada–United States border near Sandy Bay (a terminus it shares with U.S. Route 201), where it connects to Quebec Route 173. Its eastern terminus is at the Canada-US border in Vanceboro, where it connects to New Brunswick Route 4. SR 6 is the only highway in Maine to terminate at the Canadian border at both ends. With a length of 207.23 miles (333.50 km), it is the third-longest state highway in Maine. Much of SR 6 runs through isolated parts of the state.

More than two-thirds of the length of SR 6 is concurrent with other highways. The only section not shared with another route is from its junction with US 2 in Lincoln east to the New Brunswick border, covering 61.87 miles (99.57 km). Except for this section, locals generally refer to the roads by their other numbers.

== History ==
The SR 6 designation was first applied in 1937-8 on a short route in Old Orchard Beach which became part of SR 98 in 1946. In 1949, the number was applied to the modern routing between Lincoln and the New Brunswick border. In 1965, SR 6 was extended west to its modern terminus at the Quebec border by overlapping it entirely with existing highways. This remains its routing today.

== Junction list ==
County	Location	mi	km	Destinations	Notes
Somerset	Sandy Bay	0.00	0.00	R-173 north – Quebec PQ	Continuation beyond Armstrong–Jackman Border Crossing into Québec
Somerset	Sandy Bay	0.00	0.00	US 201 begins	Western end of concurrency with US 201; northern terminus of US 201
Somerset	Jackman	16.41	26.41	US 201 south – The Forks, Skowhegan, Bingham SR 15 begins	Eastern end of concurrency with US 201; western end of concurrency with SR 15; northern terminus of SR 15
Piscataquis	Abbot	86.11	138.58	SR 16 west (West Road) – Bingham, Mayfield	Western end of concurrency with SR 16
Piscataquis	Guilford	89.91	144.70	SR 150 south (South Main Street) – Skowhegan	Western end of concurrency with SR 150
Piscataquis	Guilford	90.28	145.29	SR 150 north	Eastern end of concurrency with SR 150
Piscataquis	Guilford	91.28	146.90	SR 23 – Dexter, Newport	Northern terminus of SR 23
Piscataquis	Dover-Foxcroft	97.94	157.62	SR 15 south to SR 7 – Bangor, Dexter	Eastern end of concurrency with SR 15
Piscataquis	Dover-Foxcroft	98.02	157.75	SR 153 (North Street) – Peaks-Kenny State Park	Southern terminus of SR 153
Piscataquis	Milo	111.13	178.85	SR 11 north (Main Street) – Brownville	Western end of concurrency with SR 11
Piscataquis	Milo	113.37	182.45	SR 11 south (Lyford Road) – East Corinth	Eastern end of concurrency with SR 11
Penobscot	LaGrange	121.00	194.73	SR 155 south (Mill Street) – Bradford SR 16 east (Bennoch Road) – Orono	Eastern end of concurrency with SR 16; western end of concurrency with SR 155
Penobscot	Howland	131.41– 131.62	211.48– 211.82	I-95 – Bangor, Medway, Houlton	Exit 217 on I-95
Penobscot	Howland	132.75	213.64	SR 116 south (Argyle Road) – Argyle, Old Town	Western end of concurrency with SR 116
Penobscot	Enfield	133.35	214.61	US 2 west (Main Road) – Passadumkeag SR 155 north (Hammett Road) – Enfield	Eastern end of concurrency with SR 155; western end of concurrency with US 2
Penobscot	Lincoln	143.56	231.04	SR 116 north (River Road) to I-95	Eastern end of concurrency with SR 116
Penobscot	Lincoln	145.15	233.60	SR 155 – Enfield	Northern terminus of SR 155
Penobscot	Lincoln	145.36	233.93	US 2 east – Mattawamkeag, Winn	Eastern end of concurrency with US 2
Penobscot	Lee	156.92	252.54	SR 168 (Winn Road) – Winn	Southern terminus of SR 168
Penobscot	Springfield	165.00	265.54	SR 169 / SR 170 (Park Street) – Prentiss	Southern terminus of SR 169 / SR 170
Washington	Topsfield	185.81	299.03	US 1 – Calais, Danforth	
Washington	Vanceboro	207.23	333.50	Route 4 – St. Croix, McAdam	Continuation beyond Vanceboro–St. Croix Border Crossing on the Saint Croix–Vanceboro Bridge over St. Croix River into New Brunswick
1.000 mi = 1.609 km; 1.000 km = 0.621 mi: Concurrency terminus
