= Rumford Center, Maine =

- Village
- Location within Maine Location within the United States
- Coordinates: 44°30′47″N 70°37′07″W
- Country: United States
- State: Maine
- County: Oxford
- Elevation: 617 ft (188 m)
- Time zone: UTC-5 (Eastern (EST))
  - Summer (DST): UTC-4 (EDT)
- ZIP Code: 04276 (Rumford)
- Area code: 207
- GNIS feature ID: 574582

Rumford Center is an unincorporated village in the town of Rumford, Oxford County, Maine, United States. The community is located along U.S. Route 2 and the Androscoggin River, 20 miles (32 km) north of Paris. Rumford Center had a post office until September 28, 2002.
