= Bingham, Maine =

Town in Maine, United States

- Town
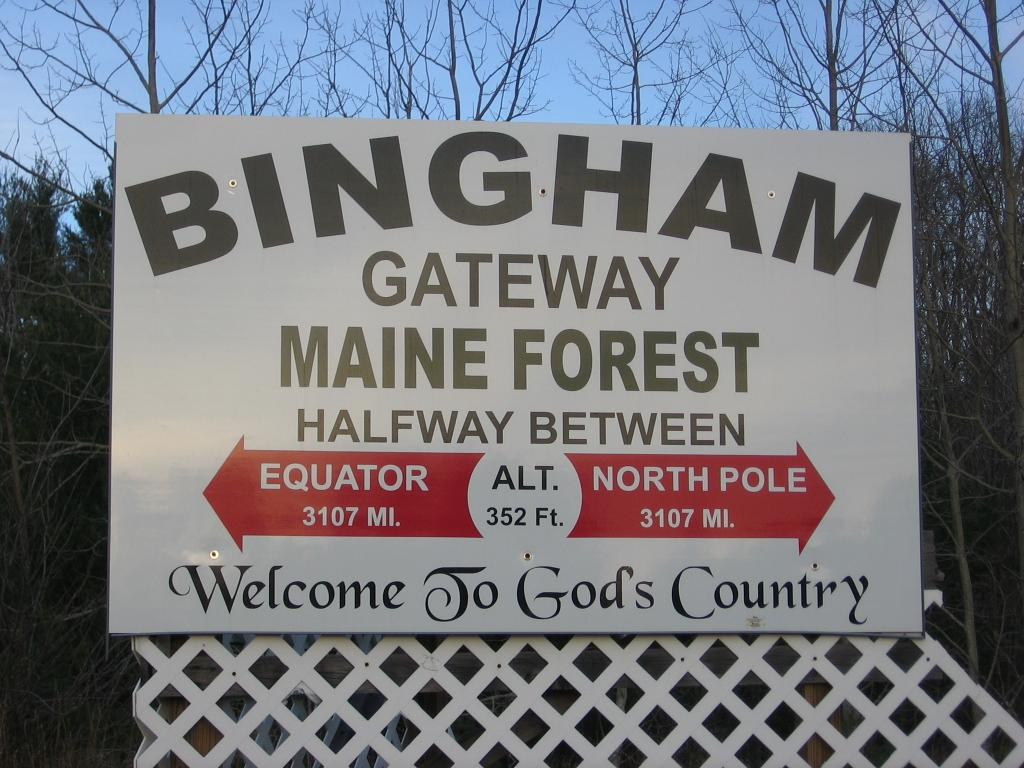
- Welcome sign

- Location within Maine Location within the United States
- Coordinates: 45°01′51″N 69°51′08″W
- Country: United States
- State: Maine
- County: Somerset
- Settled: 1785
- Incorporated: February 6, 1812

Area
  - Total: 35.32 sq mi (91.48 km^{2})
  - Land: 34.91 sq mi (90.42 km^{2})
  - Water: 0.41 sq mi (1.06 km^{2}) 1.16%
- Elevation: 676 ft (206 m)

Population (2020)
  - Total: 866
  - Density: 25/sq mi (9.6/km^{2})
- Time zone: UTC-5 (Eastern (EST))
  - Summer (DST): UTC-4 (EDT)
- ZIP code: 04920
- Area code: 207
- FIPS code: 23-05000
- GNIS feature ID: 582354
- Website: binghammaine.org

Bingham is a town in Somerset County, Maine, United States. The population was 866 at the 2020 census. Bingham is a historic town located beside the Kennebec River.

The primary settlement in town, where over 86% of the population resides, is defined as the Bingham census-designated place.

== History ==
First settled in 1785, the town is named after William Bingham, a Philadelphia banker and politician who at one time owned two million acres (8,000 km^{2}) of land in Maine known as the Bingham Purchase. The community was incorporated on February 6, 1812. By 1859, when the population was 752, Bingham had two water powered sawmills and two gristmills. It is located on the Old Canada Road (U. S. Route 201), which between 1820 until 1860 served as the primary link between Lower Canada and Maine. Bingham became an important Maine Central Railroad loading point for pulpwood floated down the Kennebec River to Wyman Dam until environmental regulations curtailed log driving in the 1970s.

== Geography ==
According to the United States Census Bureau, the town has a total area of 35.32 square miles (91.48 km^{2}), of which 34.91 square miles (90.42 km^{2}) is land and 0.41 square miles (1.06 km^{2}) is water. Bingham is drained by Jackson Brook and the Kennebec River.

The town is traversed by U.S. Route 201 and Maine State Route 16. It is bordered by the towns of Moscow to the north, Brighton Plantation to the east, and Solon to the south.

=== Climate ===
This climatic region is typified by large seasonal temperature differences, with warm to hot (and often humid) summers and cold (sometimes severely cold) winters. According to the Köppen Climate Classification system, Bingham has a humid continental climate, abbreviated "Dfb" on climate maps.

== Demographics ==
Historical population
Census	Pop.	Note	%±
1820	336		—
1830	537		59.8%
1840	751		39.9%
1850	752		0.1%
1860	831		10.5%
1870	826		−0.6%
1880	828		0.2%
1890	757		−8.6%
1900	841		11.1%
1910	775		−7.8%
1920	1,143		47.5%
1930	1,592		39.3%
1940	1,210		−24.0%
1950	1,354		11.9%
1960	1,308		−3.4%
1970	1,254		−4.1%
1980	1,184		−5.6%
1990	1,230		3.9%
2000	989		−19.6%
2010	922		−6.8%
2020	866		−6.1%
U.S. Decennial Census

=== 2010 census ===
As of the census of 2010, there were 922 people, 429 households, and 245 families living in the town. The population density was 26.4 inhabitants per square mile (10.2/km^{2}). There were 600 housing units at an average density of 17.2 per square mile (6.6/km^{2}). The racial makeup of the town was 97.0% White, 0.9% African American, 0.7% Native American, 0.3% Asian, 0.2% from other races, and 1.0% from two or more races. Hispanic or Latino of any race were 0.8% of the population.

There were 429 households, of which 24.2% had children under the age of 18 living with them, 41.5% were married couples living together, 10.5% had a female householder with no husband present, 5.1% had a male householder with no wife present, and 42.9% were non-families. 35.2% of all households were made up of individuals, and 15.9% had someone living alone who was 65 years of age or older. The average household size was 2.15 and the average family size was 2.72.

The median age in the town was 45.7 years. 19.2% of residents were under the age of 18; 7.5% were between the ages of 18 and 24; 22.1% were from 25 to 44; 30.2% were from 45 to 64; and 20.9% were 65 years of age or older. The gender makeup of the town was 49.8% male and 50.2% female.

=== 2000 census ===
As of the census of 2000, there were 989 people, 420 households, and 267 families living in the town. The population density was 28.6 inhabitants per square mile (11.0/km^{2}). There were 619 housing units at an average density of 17.9 per square mile (6.9/km^{2}). The racial makeup of the town was 99.39% White, 0.10% Native American, 0.10% Asian, 0.20% from other races, and 0.20% from two or more races. Hispanic or Latino of any race were 0.40% of the population.

There were 420 households, out of which 26.7% had children under the age of 18 living with them. 46.9% were married couples living together, 11.4% had a female householder with no husband present, and 36.2% were non-families. 29.0% of all households were made up of individuals, and 13.8% had someone living alone who was 65 years of age or older. The average household size was 2.30 and the average family size was 2.80.

In the town, the population was spread out, with 22.9% under the age of 18, 6.3% from 18 to 24, 26.3% from 25 to 44, 23.7% from 45 to 64, and 20.9% who were 65 years of age or older. The median age was 41 years. For every 100 females, there were 90.2 males. For every 100 females age 18 and over, there were 91.7 males.

The median income for a household in the town was $28,200, and the median income for a family was $31,538. Males had a median income of $25,990 versus $16,750 for females. The per capita income for the town was $19,724. About 15.6% of families and 19.3% of the population were below the poverty line, including 30.5% of those under age 18 and 8.6% of those age 65 or over.

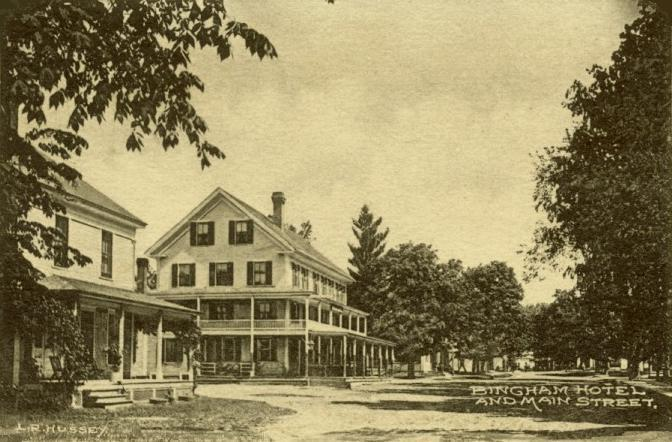
Bingham Hotel and Main Street in 1905

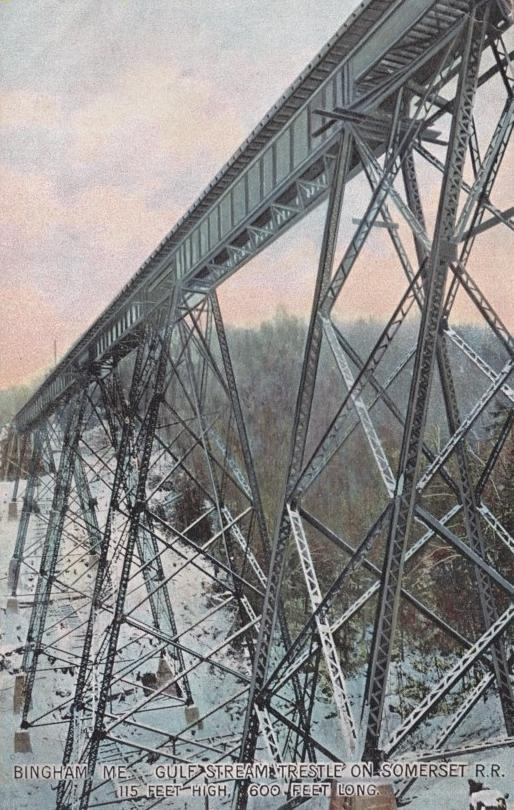
Somerset Railroad trestle in 1910

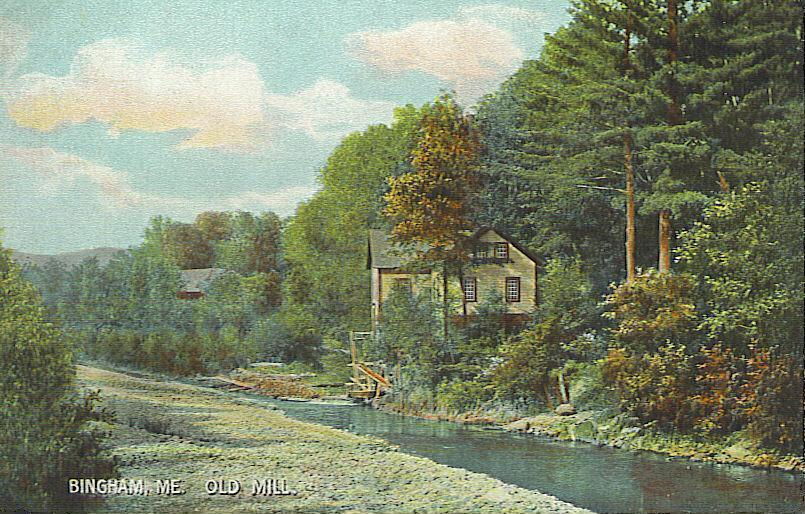
Old mill in 1909

== Notable people ==
- Gadabout Gaddis – television pioneer, lived in Bingham.
- Cody Laweryson, baseball player
- Bill Potter – singing cowboy, was born in Stratton and grew up in Bingham.
