= Madison (CDP), Maine =

Madison, Maine
- Census-designated place
- Location within Maine Location within the United States
- Coordinates: 44°47′52″N 69°52′26″W
- Country: United States
- State: Maine
- County: Somerset

Area
  - Total: 6.71 sq mi (17.38 km^{2})
  - Land: 6.43 sq mi (16.65 km^{2})
  - Water: 0.29 sq mi (0.74 km^{2})
- Elevation: 285 ft (87 m)

Population (2020)
  - Total: 2,533
  - Density: 394.1/sq mi (152.17/km^{2})
- Time zone: UTC-5 (Eastern (EST))
  - Summer (DST): UTC-4 (EDT)
- ZIP code: 04950
- Area code: 207
- FIPS code: 23-42625
- GNIS feature ID: 2377933

Madison is a census-designated place (CDP) in the town of Madison in Somerset County, Maine, United States. The population was 2,533 at the 2020 census.

== Geography ==
According to the United States Census Bureau, the CDP has a total area of 6.7 square miles (17.3 km^{2}), of which 6.4 square miles (16.7 km^{2}) is land and 0.2 square mile (0.6 km^{2}) (3.44%) is water.

== Demographics ==
Historical population
Census	Pop.	Note	%±
2020	2,533		—
U.S. Decennial Census

As of the census of 2000, there were 2,733 people, 1,145 households, and 725 families residing in the CDP. The population density was 423.8 inhabitants per square mile (163.6/km^{2}). There were 1,229 housing units at an average density of 190.6 per square mile (73.6/km^{2}). The racial makeup of the CDP was 97.91% White, 0.07% Black or African American, 0.18% Native American, 0.15% Asian, 0.04% Pacific Islander, and 1.65% from two or more races. Hispanic or Latino of any race were 0.26% of the population.

There were 1,145 households, out of which 27.2% had children under the age of 18 living with them, 46.6% were married couples living together, 13.4% had a female householder with no husband present, and 36.6% were non-families. 31.5% of all households were made up of individuals, and 16.2% had someone living alone who was 65 years of age or older. The average household size was 2.29 and the average family size was 2.81.

In the CDP, the population was spread out, with 22.5% under the age of 18, 5.4% from 18 to 24, 27.7% from 25 to 44, 22.3% from 45 to 64, and 22.0% who were 65 years of age or older. The median age was 41 years. For every 100 females, there were 83.1 males. For every 100 females age 18 and over, there were 78.3 males.

The median income for a household in the CDP was $27,250, and the median income for a family was $36,389. Males had a median income of $30,000 versus $20,183 for females. The per capita income for the CDP was $16,526. About 9.1% of families and 14.7% of the population were below the poverty line, including 23.4% of those under age 18 and 11.2% of those age 65 or over.
