= List of lettered highways in Maine =

Lettered highways in Maine
- Maine's early highway system

System information
- Maintained by MaineDOT

Highway names
- Interstates: Interstate x (abbreviated I-X)
- US Highways: U.S. Route x (abbreviated US-X)
- State: State Route x or Route x (abbreviated SR X)
- Lettered routes: Route x

System links
- Maine State Highway System; Interstate; US; State; Auto trails; Lettered highways

From 1914 to 1925, Maine used a system of lettered highways to designate cross-state routes. It is unclear as to whether the system lasted through the recognition of pole-marked auto trails by the State Highway Commission in 1919, both systems were abandoned by 1925 in favor of the New England interstate highway system.

== List of routes ==
Route	From	Through	To	Modern designation
A	Kittery	York, Wells, Kennebunk, Biddeford, Saco, Scarboro, South Portland	Portland	US 1
B	Fryeburg	Bridgton, Naples, Casco, Raymond, Windham, Westbrook	Portland	US 302
C	Portland	Falmouth, Cumberland, Yarmouth, Freeport, Brunswick, West Bath	Bath	US 1
D	Woolwich	Wiscasset, Edgecomb, Alna, Newcastle, Damariscotta, Nobleboro, Waldoboro, Warren, Thomaston, Rockland, Rockport, Camden, Lincolnville, Northport	Belfast	US 1
E	Portland	Falmouth, Cumberland, Gray, New Gloucester, Auburn, Lewiston, Greene, Monmouth, Winthrop, Manchester	Augusta	SR 100, US 202
F	Auburn	Turner, Livermore, East Livermore, Jay, Wilton, Farmington, Strong, Avon, Phillips, Sandy River Plantation	Rangely	SR 4
G	Augusta	Sidney, Belgrade, Oakland	Waterville	SR 27, SR 11
H	Augusta	Vassalboro, Winslow, Waterville, Fairfield, Skowhegan, Norridgewock, Madison, Anson, Embden, Solon, Bingham, Moscow, Caratunk Plantation, The Forks Plantation, West Forks Plantation, Johnson Mountain, Parlin Pond, Jackman Plantation, Moose River Plantation, Dennistown Plantation, Sandy Bay Plantation	Quebec Line	US 201, US 201A, US 201
I	Fairfield	Benton, Clinton, Burnham, Pittsfield, Palmyra, Newport, Etna, Carmel, Herman	Bangor	SR 100, US 2
J	Newport	Corinna, Dexter, Dover, Foxcroft, Guilford, Abbot, Monson, Shirley	Greenville	SR 7, SR 23, SR 6
K	Bangor	Veazie, Orono, Oldtown, Milford, Greenbush, Passadumkeag, Enfield, Lincoln, Winn, Mattawamkeag, Molunkus, Medway, Stacyville, Sherman, Crystal, Island Falls, Dyer Brook, Merrill, Smyrna, Ludlow, New Limerick, Houlton, Littleton, Monticello, Bridgewater, Blaine, Mars Hill, Easton, Presque Isle, Caribou, Connor, Cyr, Van Buren, Grand Isle, Madawaska, Frenchville	Fort Kent	US 2, US 1
L	Belfast	Searsport, Stockton Springs, Prospect, Frankfort, Winterport, Hampden	Bangor	US 1, US 1A
M	Bangor	Brewer, Holden, Dedham, Ellsworth	Trenton	US 1A, SR 3
N	Ellsworth	Hancock, Franklin, Sullivan, Gouldsboro, Steuben, Milbridge, Cherryfield, Harrington, Columbia, Columbia Falls, Jonesboro, Whitneyville, Machias, East Machias, Whiting, Trescott, Edmunds, Dennysville, Pembroke, Perry, Robbinstown	Calais	US 1
N Spur	Perry		Eastport	SR 190
N Spur	Whiting	Trescott	Lubec	SR 189
N Spur	Columbia Falls	Addison	Jonesport	SR 187
O	Livermore	Canton, Peru, Dixfield, Mexico, Rumford, Hanover, Newry, Bethel, Gilead	New Hampshire state line	SR 108, Main Street, US 2
P	Augusta	Chelsea, Whitefield, Windsor, Jefferson, Somerville, Washington, Union, Hope, Rockport	Rockland	SR 17
Q	Augusta	Hallowell, Farmingdale, Gardiner, Richmond, Bowdoinham, Topsham	Brunswick	US 201, SR 24
R	Augusta	Vassalboro, China, Palermo, Liberty, Montville, Searsmont, Morrill, Waldo	Belfast	US 202, SR 3
S	Gray	New Gloucester, Poland, Mechanic Falls, Oxford, Norway, Paris, Woodstock, Greenwood	Bethel	SR 26
T	Newry	Grafton, Upton	New Hampshire state line	SR 26
U*	Biddeford	Kennebunkport, Lyman, Alfred, Sanford, Lebanon	New Hampshire state line	SR 111, US 202
V*	Norridgewock	Mercer, New Sharon	Farmington	US 2
W*	Belgrade Depot	Rome	New Sharon	SR 27
X	Bangor	Glenburn, Kenduskeag, Corinth, Charleston, Garland, Hermon	Dover	ME 15

* Indicates route not finalized by 1914 report
