= List of auto trails in Maine =

Auto trails in Maine
- Maine's early highway system

Highway names
- Interstates: Interstate x (abbreviated I-X)
- US Highways: U.S. Route x (abbreviated US-X)
- State: State Route x or Route x (abbreviated SR X)
- Lettered routes: Route x

System links
- Maine State Highway System; Interstate; US; State; Auto trails; Lettered highways

Maine was one of the first states to mark their state highway system. From 1914 to 1925, Maine used a system of lettered highways to designate cross-state routes. This system was the first of its kind in the United States coordinated by a single state, predating Wisconsin's system by three years. In 1919, this system was supplanted by a series of auto trails officially created by the State Highway Commission, though it is unclear as to whether this system completely supplanted the lettering system. Both systems were abandoned by 1925 in favor of the New England interstate highway system.

== List ==
In 1919, the Maine Automobile Association and the Maine State Highway Commission collaborated to create a series of state-designated auto trails. The system posed a stark contrast to the auto trail systems of other states, which were often private endeavors, with improvements by these booster organizations ranging from simple marked poles to paving and maintenance of the road. It is unclear which routes listed below existed at what times.

| Route | Colors | From | Through | To | Lettered route | Replacement (1925) | Modern designation | Notes |
|---|---|---|---|---|---|---|---|---|
| Atlantic Highway | Blue | New Hampshire Line | Kittery, Wells, Kennebunk, Scarborough, Portland, Yarmouth, Brunswick, Bath, Wiscasset, Waldoboro, Rockland, Belfast, Searsport, Bangor, Ellsworth, Hancock, Millbridge, Jonesboro, Machias, Dennysville, Perry, Robbinston | Calais | A, C, D, L, M, N | Route 1 | US 1 | |
| Longfellow Highway | Yellow | New Hampshire Line | Bethel, Bryant Pond, West Paris, South Paris, Norway, Poland, Gray | Portland | O, S | Route 15 | US 2, SR 26 | |
| Theodore Roosevelt International Highway | White Red White | New Hampshire Line | Fryeburg, Bridgton, Naples, Raymond, North Windham, Highland Lake | Portland | B | Route 18 | U.S. 302 | |
| Grafton Notch Highway | White Yellow | New Hampshire Line | Upton, Newry | Bethel | T, O | Route 26 | US 2 | |
| International Trail | Red | Brunswick | Gardiner, Augusta, Waterville, Skowhegan, Norridgewock, Anson, Solon, Caratunk Plt, Jackman Station | Canada (Québec) Line | Q, H | Route 20 | U.S. 201, U.S. 201A | |
| Aroostock Trail | White Blue | Fairfield | Clinton, Pittsfield, Newport, Bangor, Old Town | Lincoln | I, K | Route 100, 15, (24) | US 2, (US 1) | 1923: Extended to Houlton, then Mars Hill, Presque Isle, Caribou, Van Buren, Madawaska to Canada (New Brunswick) Line |
| Capital Way | Blue White | Portland | Lewiston | Augusta | E | Route 100 | SR 100, US 202 | |
| Kennebec-Penobscot Trail | Orange White | Augusta | South China, Liberty, Searsmont, Belmont | Belfast | R | Route 102 | US 202, SR 3 | |
| Mount Desert Trail | Yellow White | Ellsworth | Hulls Cove | Bar Harbor | M | Route 183 | SR 183, SR 3 | |
| Brunswick-Greenville Highway | Green White | Newport | Dexter, Dover, Guilford, Abbott, Monson | Greenville | J | Route 104 | SR 7, SR 23, SR 6 | |
| Poland Springs-White Mountain Trail | Green | Naples | Casco, Poland | Mechanic's Falls | | Route 116 | SR 111 | |
