= Oakland (CDP), Maine =

Oakland, Maine
- Census-designated place
- Location in Kennebec County and the state of Maine
- Coordinates: 44°33′00″N 69°42′28″W
- Country: United States
- State: Maine
- County: Kennebec
- Town: Oakland

Area
  - Total: 5.71 sq mi (14.78 km^{2})
  - Land: 5.41 sq mi (14.00 km^{2})
  - Water: 0.30 sq mi (0.78 km^{2})
- Elevation: 141 ft (43 m)

Population (2020)
  - Total: 2,536
  - Density: 469.1/sq mi (181.11/km^{2})
- Time zone: UTC-5 (Eastern (EST))
  - Summer (DST): UTC-4 (EDT)
- ZIP code: 04963
- Area code: 207
- FIPS code: 23-54525
- GNIS feature ID: 2377945

Oakland is a census-designated place (CDP) comprising the main population center in the town of Oakland in Kennebec County, Maine, United States. The population was 2,602 at the 2010 census, out of 6,240 in the entire town of Oakland.

== Geography ==
The CDP is in northern Kennebec County, in the eastern part of the town of Oakland. It sits along Messalonskee Stream at the outlet of Messalonskee Lake. The village center is on the north side of the stream, but developed land exists on both sides. The CDP extends east to the Waterville city line, north to Red Brook, a west-side tributary of Messalonskee Stream, west to Ten Oaks Road, South Gage Road, and Wiley Point Road, and south to Webb Road.

Maine State Route 23 passes north–south through the community, and Maine State Route 137 passes through east–west, crossing Route 23 in the village center. Maine State Route 11 enters from the southwest and exits to the east with Route 137. Interstate 95 passes just to the east, with access from Exit 127 (Routes 11 and 137). I-95 leads northeast 58 miles (93 km) to Bangor and south 18 miles (29 km) to Augusta, the state capital. Downtown Waterville is 4 miles (6 km) to the east of Oakland via Routes 11 and 137.

According to the United States Census Bureau, the Oakland CDP has a total area of 5.7 square miles (14.8 km^{2}), of which 5.4 square miles (14.0 km^{2}) are land and 0.31 square miles (0.8 km^{2}), or 5.25%, are water. Messalonskee Stream is a northeast-flowing tributary of the Kennebec River.

== Demographics ==
Historical population
Census	Pop.	Note	%±
2020	2,536		—
U.S. Decennial Census

As of the census of 2000, there were 2,758 people, 1,149 households, and 728 families residing in the CDP. The population density was 511.4 inhabitants per square mile (197.5/km^{2}). There were 1,318 housing units at an average density of 244.4 per square mile (94.4/km^{2}). The racial makeup of the CDP was 98.15% White, 0.25% Black or African American, 0.25% Native American, 0.62% Asian, 0.07% from other races, and 0.65% from two or more races. Hispanic or Latino of any race were 0.76% of the population.

There were 1,149 households, out of which 31.2% had children under the age of 18 living with them, 47.7% were married couples living together, 11.3% had a female householder with no husband present, and 36.6% were non-families. 29.2% of all households were made up of individuals, and 11.4% had someone living alone who was 65 years of age or older. The average household size was 2.40 and the average family size was 2.96.

In the CDP, the population was spread out, with 25.2% under the age of 18, 9.3% from 18 to 24, 29.0% from 25 to 44, 23.4% from 45 to 64, and 13.1% who were 65 years of age or older. The median age was 37 years. For every 100 females, there were 95.7 males. For every 100 females age 18 and over, there were 91.7 males.

The median income for a household in the CDP was $32,700, and the median income for a family was $40,292. Males had a median income of $33,281 versus $25,326 for females. The per capita income for the CDP was $20,741. About 10.5% of families and 12.2% of the population were below the poverty line, including 15.4% of those under age 18 and 5.6% of those age 65 or over.
