= Solon, Maine =

Town in Maine, United States

- Town
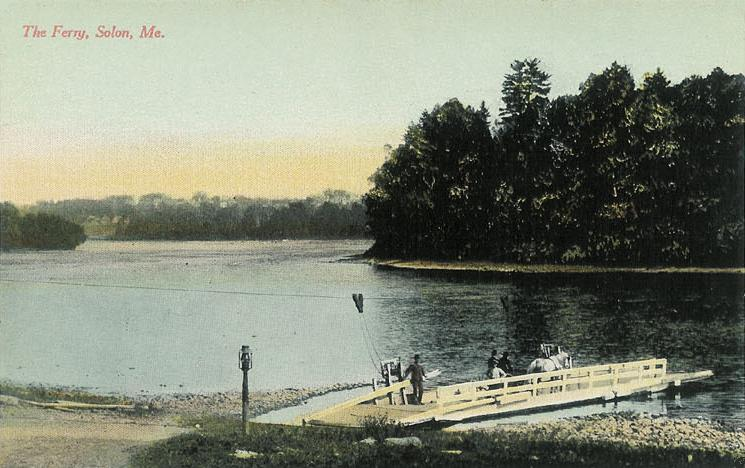
- Kennebec River c. 1908

- Seal

- Location within Maine Location within the United States
- Coordinates: 44°56′22″N 69°46′23″W
- Country: United States
- State: Maine
- County: Somerset
- Incorporated: 1809

Area
  - Total: 40.74 sq mi (105.52 km^{2})
  - Land: 39.65 sq mi (102.69 km^{2})
  - Water: 1.09 sq mi (2.82 km^{2})
- Elevation: 742 ft (226 m)

Population (2020)
  - Total: 978
  - Density: 25/sq mi (9.5/km^{2})
- Time zone: UTC-5 (Eastern (EST))
  - Summer (DST): UTC-4 (EDT)
- ZIP code: 04979
- Area code: 207
- FIPS code: 23-69505
- GNIS feature ID: 582728
- Website: solon.maine.gov

Solon is a town in Somerset County, Maine, United States. The population was 978 at the 2020 census.

== History ==
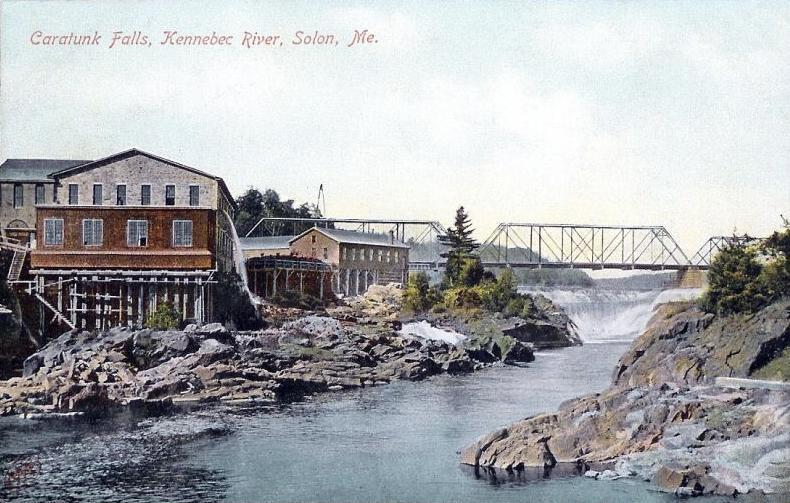
Caratunk Falls in 1909

The first known inhabitants were the Abenaki Indians, whom European settlers encountered in the early 1600s. At a rock ledge over the Kennebec River at Embden, 3 miles from the centre of Solon, there are Native American carvings dating to between 900 and 1400 CE. General Benedict Arnold and his troops camped below Caratunk Falls on October 7, 1775, before portaging their boats around the falls on the way up the Kennebec River to the Battle of Quebec. Originally called T1 R2 EKR, the plantation was known as Spauldingtown, after Thomas Spaulding, a grantee. It was settled in 1782 by William Hilton from Wiscasset, who purchased 500 acres (2.0 km^{2}). On February 23, 1809, it was incorporated as Solon, named after Solon, a statesman and poet of ancient Greece.

Agriculture was the principal occupation of the inhabitants. The surface of the town is uneven, the underlying rock is slate, but the sandy and occasionally gravelly loam produced good crops of hay and grain. Solon village was established at Fall Brook, its water power used to operate mills. By 1859, when the population was 1,419, there were two sawmills, a gristmill, a shovel handle factory, two fulling and two carding machines, and two blacksmiths. By 1886, the town's industries included a carriage manufacturer and a harness maker.

Solon is the gateway to the Old Canada Road (U.S. Route 201), which from 1820 until 1860 served as the primary link between Lower Canada and Maine. The byway follows the Kennebec River valley through various villages and into the forests near the Canada–US border.

== Geography ==
According to the United States Census Bureau, the town has a total area of 40.74 square miles (105.52 km^{2}), of which 39.65 square miles (102.69 km^{2}) is land and 1.09 square miles (2.82 km^{2}) is water. Solon is drained by Fall Brook, Michael Stream and the Kennebec River, where Caratunk Falls has a descent of 20 feet (6.1 m).

The town is crossed by U.S. Route 201, 201A and Maine State Route 8. It borders the towns of Bingham and Brighton Plantation to the north, Athens to the east, Cornville and Madison to the south, and Embden to the west.

== Demographics ==
Historical population
Census	Pop.	Note	%±
1800	38		—
1810	312		721.1%
1820	468		50.0%
1830	768		64.1%
1840	1,139		48.3%
1850	1,415		24.2%
1860	1,345		−4.9%
1870	1,176		−12.6%
1880	1,013		−13.9%
1890	977		−3.6%
1900	996		1.9%
1910	1,034		3.8%
1920	1,054		1.9%
1930	852		−19.2%
1940	773		−9.3%
1950	746		−3.5%
1960	669		−10.3%
1970	712		6.4%
1980	827		16.2%
1990	916		10.8%
2000	940		2.6%
2010	1,053		12.0%
2020	978		−7.1%
U.S. Decennial Census

=== 2010 census ===
As of the census of 2010, there were 1,053 people, 459 households, and 292 families living in the town. The population density was 26.6 inhabitants per square mile (10.3/km^{2}). There were 657 housing units at an average density of 16.6 per square mile (6.4/km^{2}). The racial makeup of the town was 97.9% White, 0.2% African American, 0.4% Native American, 0.1% Asian, and 1.4% from two or more races. Hispanic or Latino of any race were 0.4% of the population.

There were 459 households, of which 26.4% had children under the age of 18 living with them, 52.5% were married couples living together, 5.9% had a female householder with no husband present, 5.2% had a male householder with no wife present, and 36.4% were non-families. 27.0% of all households were made up of individuals, and 8.3% had someone living alone who was 65 years of age or older. The average household size was 2.29 and the average family size was 2.75.

The median age in the town was 45.4 years. 20.1% of residents were under the age of 18; 5.1% were between the ages of 18 and 24; 24.2% were from 25 to 44; 35.6% were from 45 to 64; and 15.1% were 65 years of age or older. The gender makeup of the town was 52.6% male and 47.4% female.

=== 2000 census ===
As of the census of 2000, there were 940 people, 398 households, and 257 families living in the town. The population density was 23.6 people per square mile (9.1/km^{2}). There were 581 housing units at an average density of 14.6 per square mile (5.6/km^{2}). The racial makeup of the town was 98.83% White, 0.43% Black, 0.21% Native American, 0.11% Asian, and 0.43% from two or more races. Hispanic or Latino of any race were 0.43% of the population.

There were 398 households, out of which 27.1% had children under the age of 18 living with them, 53.0% were married couples living together, 6.5% had a female householder with no husband present, and 35.4% were non-families. 27.1% of all households were made up of individuals, and 9.5% had someone living alone who was 65 years of age or older. The average household size was 2.34 and the average family size was 2.82.

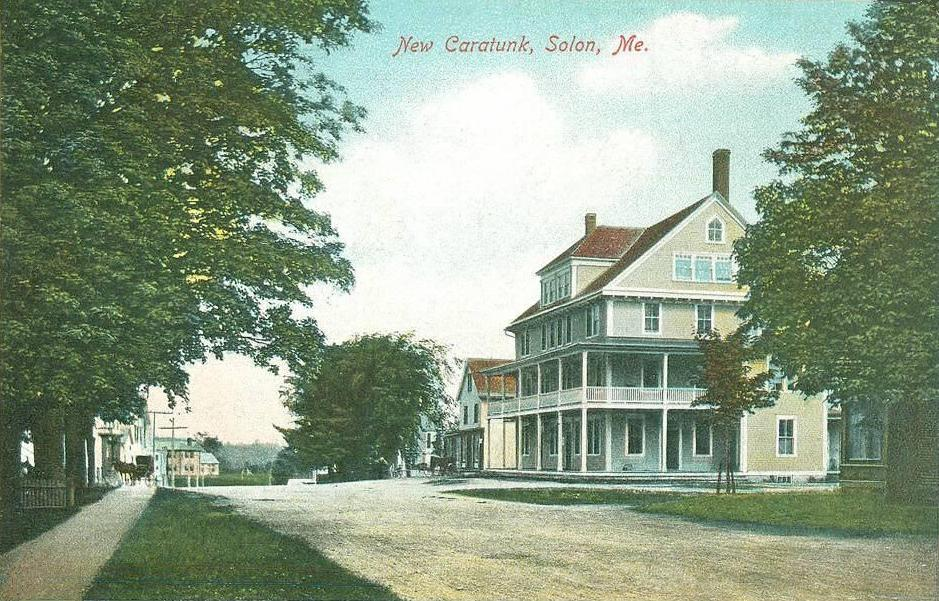
The New Caratunk in 1907

In the town, the population was spread out, with 21.9% under the age of 18, 7.3% from 18 to 24, 26.5% from 25 to 44, 30.3% from 45 to 64, and 13.9% who were 65 years of age or older. The median age was 42 years. For every 100 females, there were 113.6 males. For every 100 females age 18 and over, there were 109.7 males.

The median income for a household in the town was $27,266, and the median income for a family was $32,500. Males had a median income of $25,724 versus $16,574 for females. The per capita income for the town was $13,777. About 12.1% of families and 18.0% of the population were below the poverty line, including 21.9% of those under age 18 and 15.3% of those age 65 or over.

== Stereographic cards ==
Stereoscopic photographs of Solon from the Victorian era:

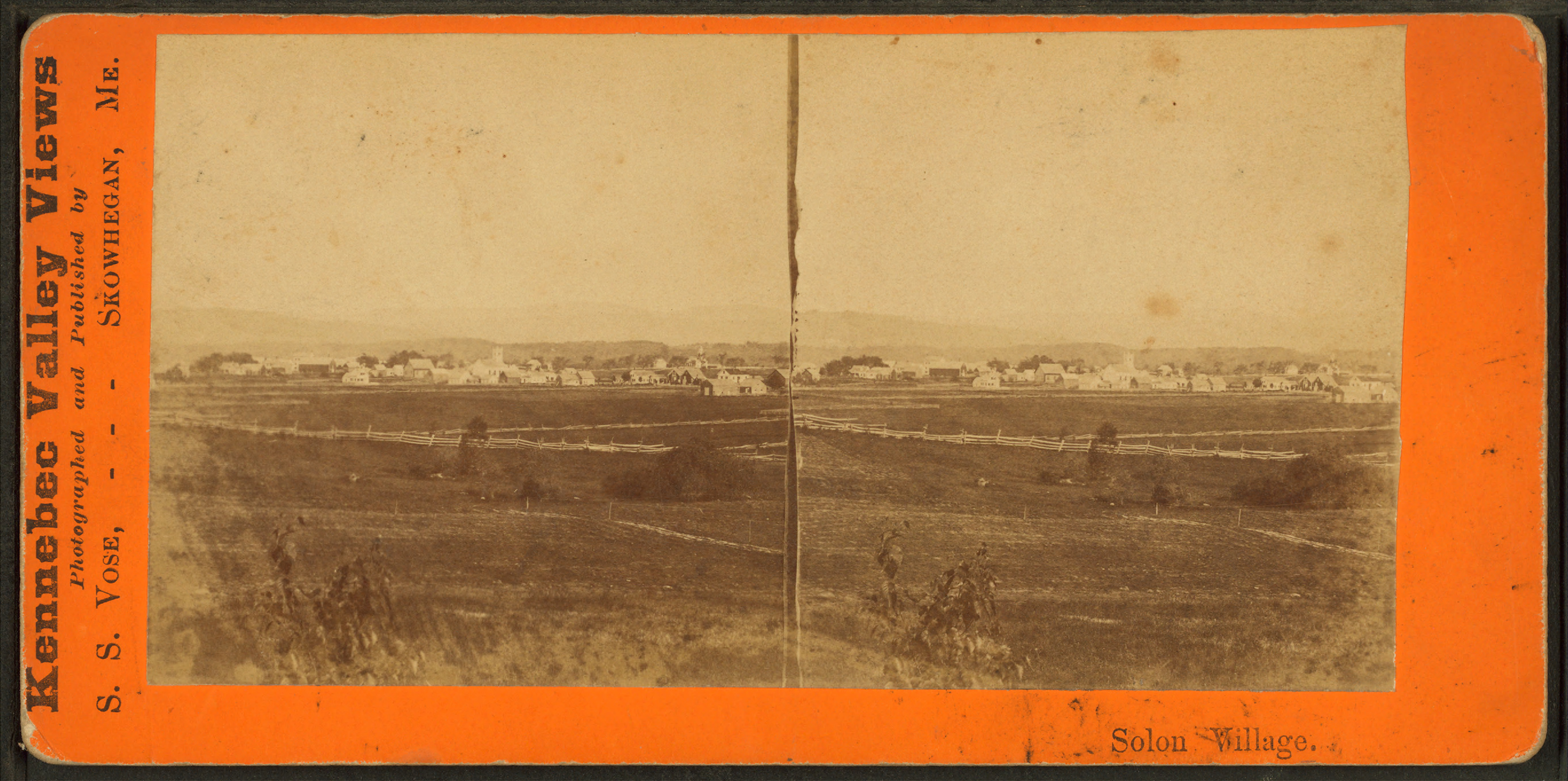
Solon village

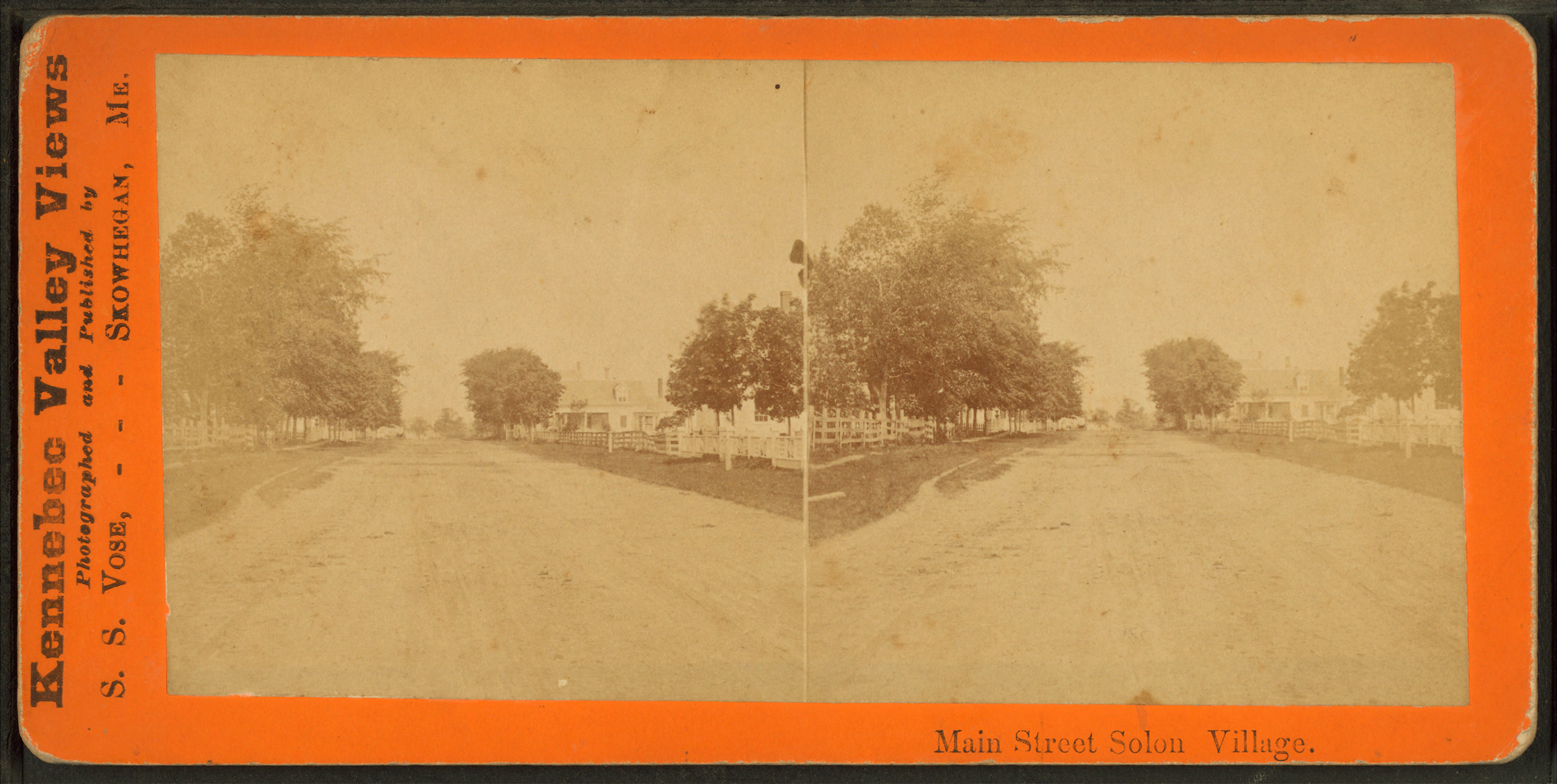
Main Street

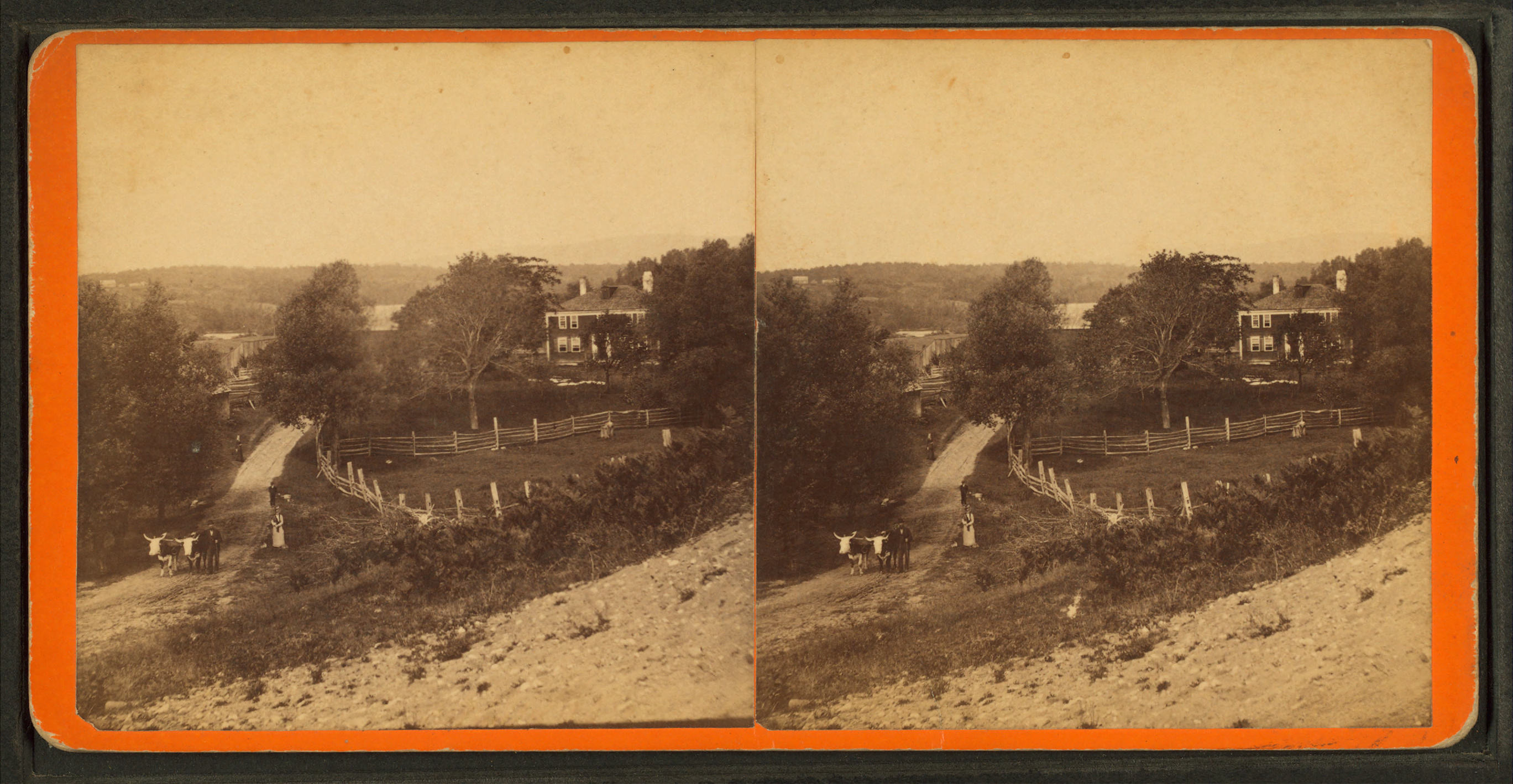
Pierce residence

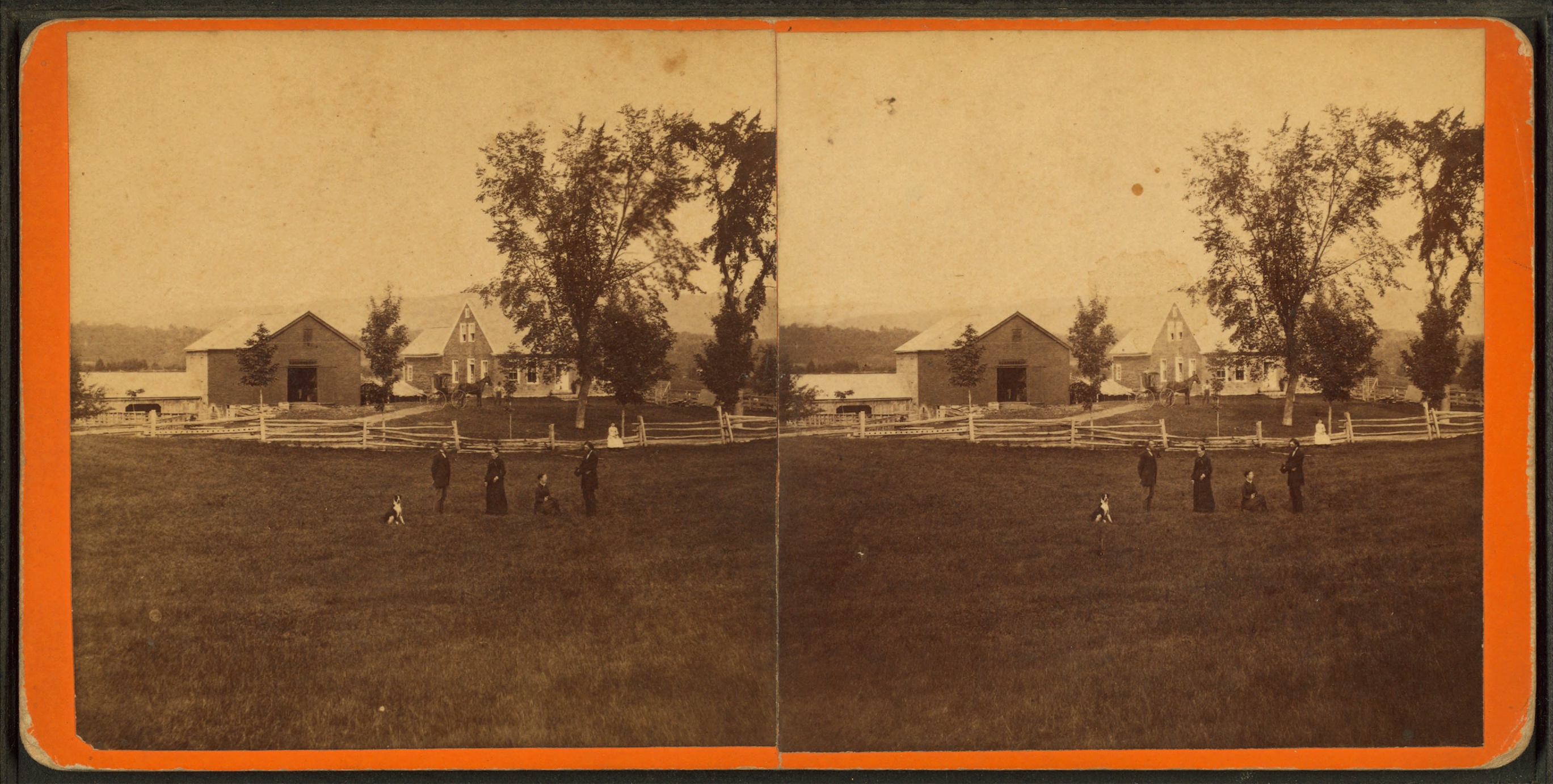
Jewett residence

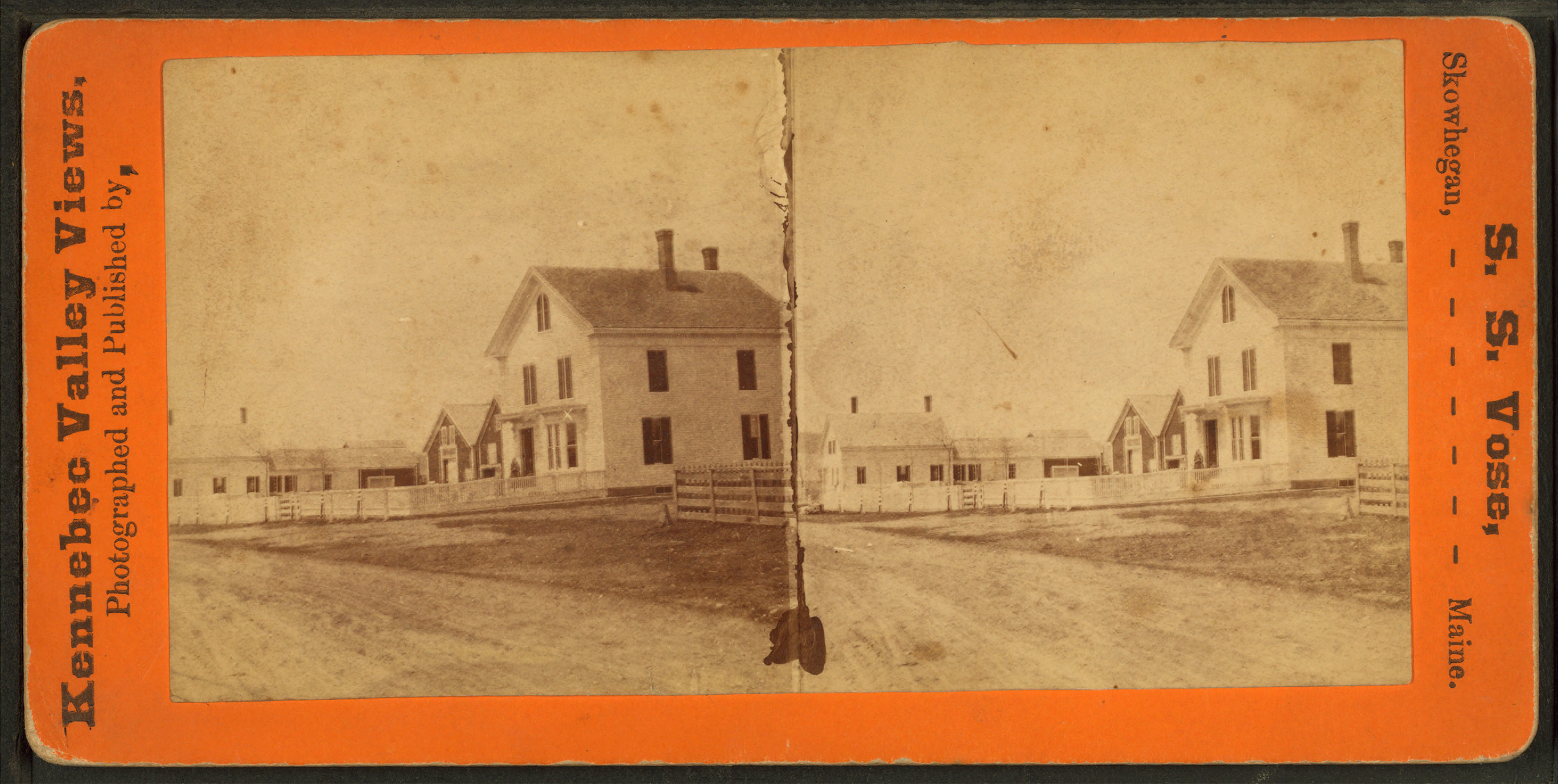
Whipple residence

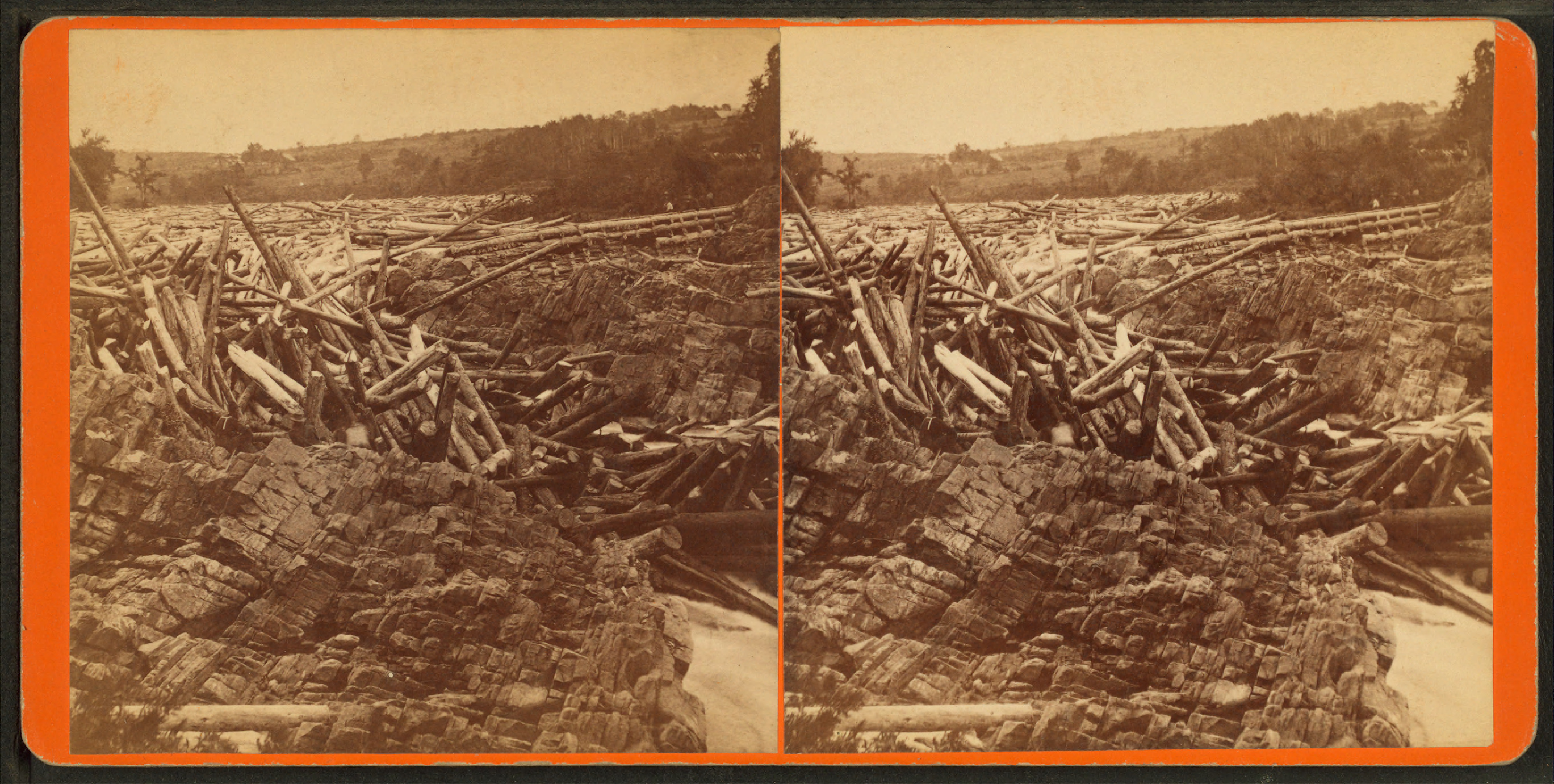
Logs on Caratunk Falls

== Sites of interest ==
- South Solon Meeting House (1842), with 1950s frescos by the Skowhegan School of Painting & Sculpture
- Evergreen Wilderness Chapel & 1800s Christian Museum -- an 1800s country church replica and Christian museum

== Notable person ==
- George Washburn; pitcher with the New York Yankees
