= Maine State Route 143 =

State highway in Penobscot County, Maine, US

State Route 143

Route information
- Maintained by MaineDOT
- Length: 15.1 mi (24.3 km)

Major junctions
- South end: US 202 / SR 9 in Dixmont
- I-95 in Etna; US 2 in Etna
- North end: SR 222 in Stetson

Location
- Country: United States
- State: Maine
- Counties: Penobscot

Highway system
- Maine State Highway System; Interstate; US; State; Auto trails; Lettered highways
← SR 142	→ SR 144

State Route 143 (SR 143) is a 15-mile-long (24 km) state highway in the U.S. state of Maine. The highway, located entirely in Penobscot County, connects U.S. Route 202 (US 202) and SR 9 in the town of Dixmont and SR 222 in the town of Stetson.

== Route description ==
SR 143 begins at an intersection of Western Avenue (US 202 and SR 9) in the community of Dixmont Center. The highway heads north, later northeast, through a mostly wooded area in the central part of the state. It bends to the east as it passes in front of a few small farms. At Miles Road and Smith Road in the community of Simpson Corners, SR 143 turns to the north again heading through a forested area. In front of an elementary school, the road crosses into the town of Etna. Nearing Etna Center, SR 143 reaches an intersection with SR 69 heading towards the west and ramps to and from the northbound lanes of Interstate 95 (I-95) at its interchange 167. SR 69 and SR 143 form a short concurrency under I-95's overpasses. After passing the I-95's southbound entrance and exit ramps, SR 69 turns off the road to the east while SR 143 continues north.

Continuing through Etna, the highway climbs a small hill before descending again to an intersection with US 2 and SR 100. Past this intersection, the road continues downhill crossing a railroad at the center of the Etna settlement. It passes to the west of Etna Pond before crossing into Stetson. SR 143 resumes passing through a rural area passing to the west of a campground and Pleasant Lake before entering the community of Stetson and ending at SR 222.

== Major junctions ==
The entire route is in Penobscot County.

Location	mi	km	Destinations	Notes
Dixmont	0.0	0.0	US 202 / SR 9 (Western Avenue) / Kennebec Road	
Etna	7.2	11.6	SR 69 west (West Plymouth Road) – Pittsfield	Southern end of SR 69 concurrency
Etna	7.2– 7.4	11.6– 11.9	I-95 – Bangor, Newport	Exit 167 (I-95)
Etna	7.5	12.1	SR 69 east (Plymouth Road) / Center Lane – Carmel	Northern end of SR 69 concurrency
Etna	9.5	15.3	US 2 / SR 100 (Stage Road) – Newport, Bangor	
Stetson	15.1	24.3	SR 222 (Mullen Road) / Stetson Road – Corinna, Levant	
1.000 mi = 1.609 km; 1.000 km = 0.621 mi: Concurrency terminus
