= Maine State Route 69 =

State highway in Maine, US

State Route 69

Route information
- Maintained by MaineDOT
- Length: 34.86 mi (56.10 km)
- Existed: 1959–present

Major junctions
- West end: SR 11 / SR 100 in Pittsfield
- I-95 / SR 143 in Etna; US 2 / SR 100 in Carmel; I-95 in Carmel / Newburgh; US 202 / SR 9 in Newburgh
- East end: US 1A / SR 139 in Winterport

Location
- Country: United States
- State: Maine
- Counties: Somerset, Penobscot, Waldo

Highway system
- Maine State Highway System; Interstate; US; State; Auto trails; Lettered highways
← SR 52	→ SR 73

State Route 69 (SR 69) is part of Maine's system of numbered state highways, located in the central coastal region of the state. It runs 34.86 miles (56.10 km) from SR 11 and SR 100 in Pittsfield to US 1A in Winterport (a terminus it shares with SR 139). SR 69 is signed east-west, but follows a northwest-to-southeast routing.

== Route description ==
=== Pittsfield to Etna ===
SR 69 begins in the town center of Pittsfield at an intersection with SR 11 and SR 100, just feet from the southern terminus of SR 152. The highway proceeds southeast out of Pittsfield into the town of Detroit and meets SR 220 at the east branch of the Sebasticook River. The two highways share a brief concurrency before splitting, with SR 69 continuing southeast towards Plymouth. Crossing into Penobscot County, SR 69 passes through the center of the small town, crossing SR 7 along the way. SR 7 is one of several connections to I-95 from SR 69. Continuing east into Etna, SR 69 intersects and briefly overlaps SR 143 at a shared interchange with I-95 at exit 167.

=== Carmel to Winterport ===
SR 69 passes into Carmel, intersects with US 2 / SR 100, and turns southward towards Newburgh. SR 69 has another interchange with I-95 at exit 174, located virtually on the town line. SR 69 skirts the eastern edge of Newburgh, crosses US 202/SR 9, and passes through the southwestern corner of Hampden without any major crossings. SR 69 crosses into Winterport in Waldo County and intersects with SR 139 northwest of town. From this intersection, SR 69 is cosigned with SR 139 into town. Both routes terminate in the town center at US 1A, near the western bank of the Penobscot River.

== History ==
SR 69 was designated in 1959 over entirely new routing except for the easternmost 2.5 miles (4.0 km), which were cosigned with existing SR 139 to the US 1A intersection.

The only significant realignment SR 69 has undergone us at the I-95 / SR 143 interchange in Etna. An orphaned stub is present on the north side of I-95, west of the SR 69 / SR 143 split north of the interchange—presumably an intended alignment for SR 69 until it was moved to cross over I-95 via SR 143 instead.

== Junction list ==
County	Location	mi	km	Destinations	Notes
Somerset	Pittsfield	0.0	0.0	SR 11 / SR 100 (Main Street) to SR 152 / I-95 – Clinton, Newport	Western terminus of SR 69
Somerset	Detroit	4.8	7.7	SR 220 north (Main Street) – Palmyra	Western terminus of SR 69/220 concurrency
Somerset	Detroit	5.1	8.2	SR 220 south (Troy Road) – Troy	Eastern terminus of SR 69/220 concurrency
Penobscot	Plymouth	9.6	15.4	SR 7 (Moosehead Trail) – Newport, Dixmont	
Penobscot	Etna	15.3	24.6	SR 143 south – Dixmont; I-95 – Augusta, Bangor	Southern terminus of SR 69/143 concurrency I-95 exit 167
Penobscot	Etna	15.5	24.9	SR 143 north – Etna, Stetson	Northern terminus of SR 69/143 concurrency
Penobscot	Carmel	18.3	29.5	US 2 / SR 100 (Main Road) – Newport, Bangor	
Penobscot	Newburgh	23.3	37.5	I-95 – Augusta, Bangor	I-95 exit 174
Penobscot	Newburgh	25.0	40.2	US 202 / SR 9 (Western Avenue) – Dixmont, Hampden	
Waldo	Winterport	32.3	52.0	SR 139 west (Airport Road) – Monroe, Brooks	Western terminus of SR 69/139 concurrency
Waldo	Winterport	34.9	56.2	US 1A (Main Street/South Main Street) – Hampden, Stockton Springs SR 139 ends	Eastern terminus of SR 69/139
1.000 mi = 1.609 km; 1.000 km = 0.621 mi: Concurrency terminus
