= Maine's 3rd State Senate district =

American legislative district

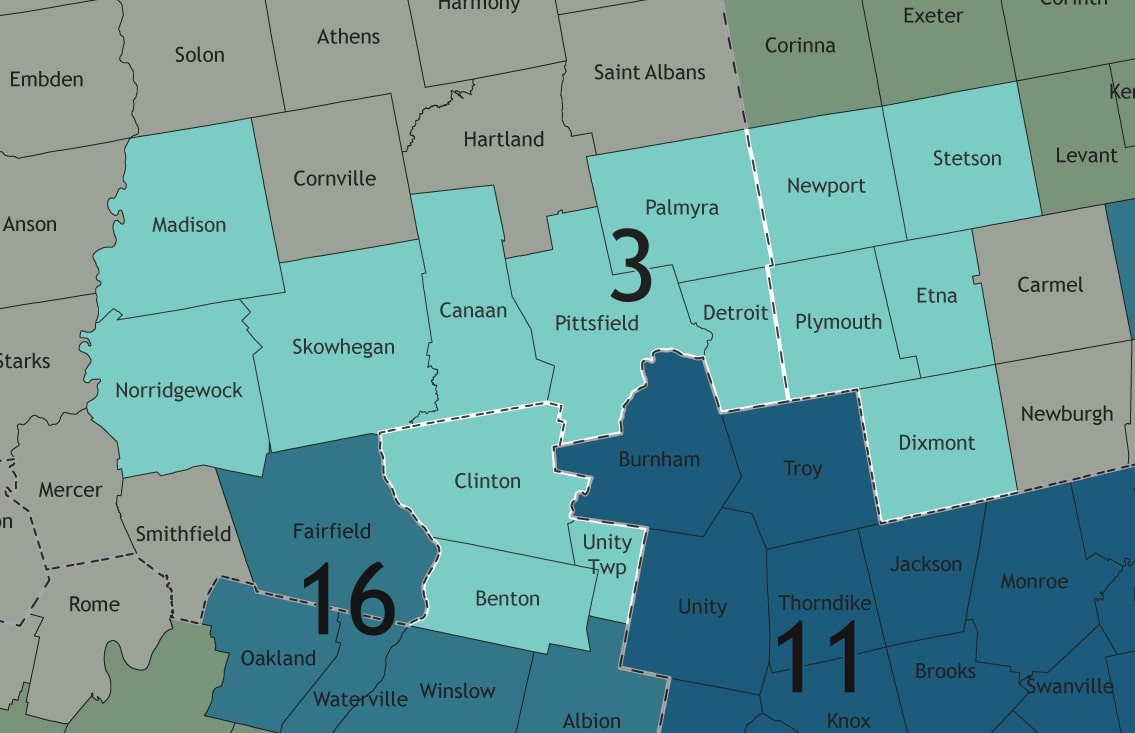
Senator
Brad Farrin; R–Somerset County
- Registration: 35.4% Republican; 17% Democratic; 47.6% No party preference
- Population (2020): 39,749

Maine's 3rd State Senate district is one of 35 districts in the Maine Senate. It has been represented by Republican Brad Farrin since 2018.

== Geography ==
District 3 includes small parts of the counties of Kennebec, Penobscot, and Somerset. Kennebec County - 5% of county Penobscot County - 5.3% of county Somerset County - 50.6% of county

Kennebec:

Towns:

- Benton
- Clinton
- Unity Township (different from Town of Unity in Waldo County)

Penobscot:

Towns:

- Dixmont
- Etna
- Newport
- Plymouth
- Stetson

Somerset:

Towns:

- Canaan
- Detroit
- Madison
- Norridgewock
- Palmyra
- Pittsfield
- Skowhegan

== Recent election results ==
=== 2022 ===
2022 Maine State Senate election, District 3
Party	Candidate	Votes	%
Republican	Brad Farrin	11,681	65.4
Democratic	Sean Bean	4,997	30
Write-in	Multiple candidates	25	0.1
Total votes		17,158	100
Republican hold			

Elections prior to 2022 were held under different district lines.

=== 2024 ===
2024 Maine State Senate election, District 3
Party	Candidate	Votes	%
Republican	Brad Farrin	14,088	67.6
Democratic	Ethan S. Brownell	6,740	32.4
Total votes		20,828	100.0
Republican hold			

== Historical election results ==
=== 2012 ===
2012 Maine State Senate election, District 3
Party	Candidate	Votes	%
Democratic	John Tuttle	11,070	61.9
Republican	Bradford Littlefield	6,801	38.1
Total votes		20,414	100
Democratic hold			

=== 2014 ===
2014 Maine State Senate election, District 3
Party	Candidate	Votes	%
Republican	Rodney Whittemore	10,103	63.1
Democratic	Craig Heavey	5,004	31.2
Blank votes	None	907	5.7
Total votes		16,014	100
Republican gain from Democratic			

=== 2016 ===
2016 Maine State Senate election, District 3
Party	Candidate	Votes	%
Republican	Rodney Whittemore	9,981	53.8
Democratic	Jeffrey McCabe	8,557	46.2
Total votes		18,538	100
Republican hold			

=== 2018 ===
2018 Maine State Senate election, District 3
Party	Candidate	Votes	%
Republican	Brad Farrin	8,876	60.4
Democratic	Jeffrey Johnson	5,827	39.6
Total votes		14,703	100
Republican hold			

=== 2020 ===
2020 Maine State Senate election, District 3
Party	Candidate	Votes	%
Republican	Harold Stewart	10,838	56.8
Democratic	Michael E. Carpenter	7,485	43
Green	Henry John Bear (Write in)	34	0.2
Total votes		19,080	100
Republican gain from Democratic			
