= Maine State Route 94 =

State highway in Penobscot County, Maine, US

State Route 94

Route information
- Maintained by MaineDOT
- Length: 13.22 mi (21.28 km)
- Existed: 1948–present

Major junctions
- West end: SR 7 in Dexter
- East end: SR 11 / SR 43 in Corinth

Location
- Country: United States
- State: Maine
- Counties: Penobscot

Highway system
- Maine State Highway System; Interstate; US; State; Auto trails; Lettered highways
← SR 93	→ I-95

State Route 94 (SR 94) is a secondary state highway located in central Maine. It runs for 13.2 miles (21.2 km), connecting SR 7 in Dexter to SR 11 and SR 43 west of Corinth. SR 94 is an east–west highway.

== Route description ==
SR 94 begins in the west at an intersection with SR 7 just south of downtown Dexter, where SR 7 connects with SR 23. The highway is the most direct connection between the towns of Dexter and Corinth, and is the lone route serving the town center of Garland, which SR 94 passes through without any major crossings. After passing through Garland, SR 94 turns southeast, where it enters the town limits of Corinth and ends at an intersection with SR 11/SR 43. These routes provide a connection SR 15 near the town center, 1.6 miles (2.6 km) to the east. SR 11/SR 43 (via SR 7) also provide a connection between Dexter and Corinth (via Corinna and Exeter) to the south, but is a much longer, meandering route than SR 94.

== Junction list ==
The entire route is in Penobscot County.

Location	mi	km	Destinations	Notes
Dexter	0.00	0.00	SR 7 (Spring Street/Corinna Road) to SR 23 – Dexter, Corinna	
Corinth	13.22	21.28	SR 11 / SR 43 (Exeter Road) to SR 15 – Corinth, Exeter	
1.000 mi = 1.609 km; 1.000 km = 0.621 mi
