= Maine State Route 222 =

State highway in Penobscot County, Maine, US

State Route 222

Route information
- Maintained by MaineDOT
- Length: 27.44 mi (44.16 km)
- Existed: 1936–present

Major junctions
- West end: SR 7 / SR 11 / SR 43 in Corinna
- I-95 / SR 15 in Bangor
- East end: US 2 / SR 100 in Bangor

Location
- Country: United States
- State: Maine
- Counties: Penobscot

Highway system
- Maine State Highway System; Interstate; US; State; Auto trails; Lettered highways
← SR 221	→ SR 223

State Route 222 (SR 222) is a state highway located in Penobscot County in central Maine. It begins at State Routes 7, 11, and 43 in Corinna and runs southwest into the city of Bangor, where it ends at U.S. Route 2 (US 2) and SR 100. The route is 27.44 miles (44.16 km) long.

== Route description ==
SR 222 begins in the center of Corinna at an intersection with Dexter Road which carries SR 7/SR 11/SR 43. It heads southeast along Stetson Road passing some businesses, a school, and houses. At Spragues Mills, the road turns to the south and enters the town of Newport. Through here, it mainly heads through wooded areas. In the community of Coburn, the road turns to the east again through a rural area with some clusters of houses at Coburn and North Newport. SR 222 enters the town of Stetson where in the center of the town, intersects SR 143 at its northern terminus. From here, houses continually line both sides of the road. After entering the town of Levant, SR 222 turns sharply to the southeast at West Levant.

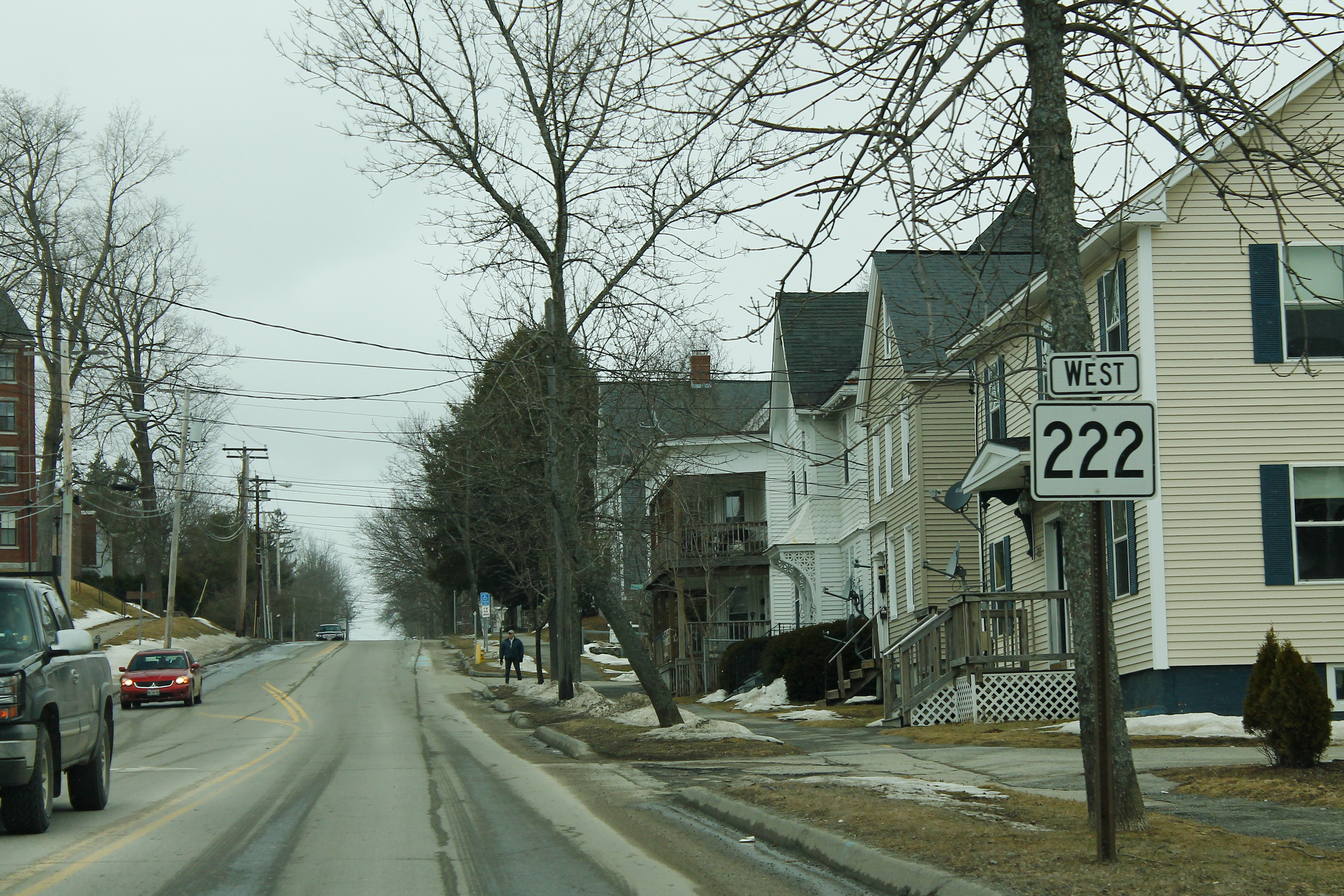
First reassurance shield for westbound SR 222 in Bangor

After passing through the town center of Levant, the road clips the towns of Glenburn and Hermon where more houses and small developments line the route. After entering the city of Bangor, more businesses begin to line the road as it widens to four lanes. SR 222 provides access to Bangor International Airport in this area. Continuing southeast, the highway narrows to two lanes again and enters a residential neighborhood. Interstate 95 (I-95) and SR 15 has an interchange with SR 222 in this area though southbound I-95/SR 15 traffic must use 16th Street and Ohio Street to enter the freeway. Just outside of the city downtown area, SR 222 ends at Hammond Street, which carries US 2 / SR 100.

The road continues as Union Street which connects with US 1A / SR 9 and crosses the Penobscot River into Brewer.

== History ==
The SR 222 designation was first used in 1931 for a new routing in connecting US 1 in Caribou to the Canadian border east of Fort Fairfield. In 1933, SR 161 was extended and absorbed the entire route. In 1940, SR 161 was truncated and the section east of US 1A in Fort Fairfield was redesignated as part of SR 167.

The modern SR 222 was designated in 1936 on a new routing between Corinna and Bangor, and its alignment has not changed since.

== Major junctions ==
The entire route is in Penobscot County.

Location	mi	km	Destinations	Notes
Corinna	0.00	0.00	SR 7 / SR 11 / SR 43 (Dexter Road) – Newport, Dexter, Exeter	
Stetson	7.18	11.56	SR 143 south (Lakins Road) / Stetson Road – Etna	Northern terminus of SR 143
Bangor	26.45– 26.52	42.57– 42.68	I-95 north / SR 15 north – Orono	Exit 184 (I-95); no access to I-95/SR 15 southbound
Bangor	27.44	44.16	US 2 / SR 100 (Hammond Street) / Union Street – Brewer, Hermon	
1.000 mi = 1.609 km; 1.000 km = 0.621 mi: Incomplete access
