= Samuel G. Butman =

American politician

Member of the Maine House of Representatives from the Newport, Stetson, and Plymouth district
- In office January 1, 1873 – January 7, 1874
- Preceded by: Elliot Walker
- Succeeded by: George Crockett

Personal details
- Born: Samuel Grenville Butman; April 1826 Dixmont, Maine, U.S.
- Died: February 18, 1899 (aged 72) Plymouth, Maine, U.S.
- Party: Republican
- Parent: Samuel Butman (father)
- Occupation: Lawyer; politician

Samuel Grenville Butman (April 1826 – February 18, 1899) was an American politician, who served in the Maine House of Representatives. He was the son of politician Samuel Butman.
