= Corinna (CDP), Maine =

Corinna, Maine
- Census-designated place
- Location within Maine Location within the United States
- Coordinates: 44°55′34″N 69°15′05″W
- Country: United States
- State: Maine
- County: Penobscot
- Town: Corinna

Area
  - Total: 2.13 sq mi (5.51 km^{2})
  - Land: 2.13 sq mi (5.51 km^{2})
  - Water: 0 sq mi (0.00 km^{2})
- Elevation: 240 ft (73 m)

Population (2020)
  - Total: 729
  - Density: 342.4/sq mi (132.21/km^{2})
- Time zone: UTC-5 (Eastern (EST))
  - Summer (DST): UTC-4 (EDT)
- ZIP Code: 04928
- Area code: 207
- FIPS code: 23-04928
- GNIS feature ID: 2806285

Corinna is a census-designated place (CDP) and the primary village in the town of Corinna, Penobscot County, Maine, United States. It is in the southern part of the town, on both sides of the East Branch Sebasticook River, part of the Kennebec River watershed.

Several state highways pass through the village. Maine State Route 7 enters from the south as Newport Road and departs to the north as Dexter Road. Newport is 6 miles (10 km) to the south, and Dexter is 8 miles (13 km) to the north. State Route 11 enters from the south with Route 7, but leaves to the northeast on Exeter Road, leading 7.5 miles (12.1 km) to Exeter Center. State Route 43 enters from the west on St. Albans Road and leaves to the northeast with Route 11. St. Albans is 7.5 miles (12.1 km) to the west of Corinna. State Route 222 leads southeast out of Corinna on Stetson Road, leading 7 miles (11 km) to Stetson.

Corinna was first listed as a CDP prior to the 2020 census.

== Demographics ==
Historical population
Census	Pop.	Note	%±
2020	729		—
U.S. Decennial Census
