= Corinth, Maine =

Town in Maine, United States

- Town
- Logo

- Location within Maine Location within the United States
- Coordinates: 44°59′10″N 68°59′57″W
- Country: United States
- State: Maine
- County: Penobscot
- Incorporated: 1811

Area
  - Total: 40.27 sq mi (104.30 km^{2})
  - Land: 40.27 sq mi (104.30 km^{2})
  - Water: 0 sq mi (0 km^{2})
- Elevation: 213 ft (65 m)

Population (2020)
  - Total: 2,900
  - Density: 72/sq mi (27.8/km^{2})
- Time zone: UTC-5 (Eastern (EST))
  - Summer (DST): UTC-4 (EDT)
- ZIP code: 04427
- Area code: 207
- FIPS code: 23-14380
- GNIS feature ID: 582420
- Website: www.townofcorinth.com

Corinth is a town in Penobscot County, Maine, United States. The population was 2,900 at the 2020 census.

== History ==
Colin Palmer was the founder of Corinth. In 1792, he built his home on Lot 10 First Range. Tibbetts enlisted as a private in Captain Reuben Dyers' company at the age of 17 on May 26, 1777, from Gouldsboro, Maine. Tibbetts' grave, with an official grave marker of a Revolutionary War soldier, is found in the East Exeter cemetery.

The town was settled in the late 1790s by the extended Daniel Skinner family and originally called "Ohio". There is still an "Ohio Street" in nearby Bangor, being a portion of the original road or trail connecting that town with what is now Corinth. When the town was incorporated in 1811, it changed its name to Corinth, a reference to the classical Greek city. A number of Penobscot County towns incorporated in the same period such as Milo, Etna, Carmel, and Levant (and Troy, in neighboring Waldo County) were given similarly exotic names, referencing the ancient Mediterranean world, probably in order to help attract settlers. Some of these names also have Biblical references.

By the mid-19th century, the town had three villages: East Corinth, West Corinth, and South Corinth. East Corinth emerged as the largest, and had five shops making carriages and sleighs (a local specialty) by the 1850s.

The Skinner Settlement in West Corinth is listed on the National Register of Historic Places. This early 19th century village-scape includes a general store, schoolhouse, and Methodist church. The Robeyville Covered Bridge near East Corinth is also listed on the National Register, and is one of very few such bridges to survive in Maine.

== Geography ==
According to the United States Census Bureau, the town has a total area of 40.27 square miles (104.30 km^{2}), all land, of which 38% is covered in forest.

== Demographics ==
Historical population
Census	Pop.	Note	%±
1820	296		—
1830	712		140.5%
1840	1,318		85.1%
1850	1,600		21.4%
1860	1,790		11.9%
1870	1,462		−18.3%
1880	1,333		−8.8%
1890	1,154		−13.4%
1900	1,042		−9.7%
1910	1,034		−0.8%
1920	891		−13.8%
1930	931		4.5%
1940	954		2.5%
1950	1,167		22.3%
1960	1,138		−2.5%
1970	1,212		6.5%
1980	1,711		41.2%
1990	2,177		27.2%
2000	2,511		15.3%
2010	2,878		14.6%
2020	2,900		0.8%
U.S. Decennial Census

=== 2010 census ===
As of the census of 2010, there were 2,878 people, 1,125 households, and 798 families living in the town. The population density was 71.5 inhabitants per square mile (27.6/km^{2}). There were 1,233 housing units at an average density of 30.6 per square mile (11.8/km^{2}). The racial makeup of the town was 97.4% White, 0.3% African American, 0.5% Native American, 0.3% Asian, 0.1% from other races, and 1.4% from two or more races. Hispanic or Latino of any race were 0.7% of the population.

There were 1,125 households, of which 33.5% had children under the age of 18 living with them, 55.9% were married couples living together, 9.9% had a female householder with no husband present, 5.2% had a male householder with no wife present, and 29.1% were non-families. 21.7% of all households were made up of individuals, and 7.9% had someone living alone who was 65 years of age or older. The average household size was 2.56 and the average family size was 2.94.

The median age in the town was 40.4 years. 24.7% of residents were under the age of 18; 7.2% were between the ages of 18 and 24; 25.2% were from 25 to 44; 29.7% were from 45 to 64; and 13.1% were 65 years of age or older. The gender makeup of the town was 48.9% male and 51.1% female.

=== 2000 census ===
As of the census of 2000, there were 2,511 people, 959 households, and 715 families living in the town. The population density was 62.5 inhabitants per square mile (24.1/km^{2}). There were 1,040 housing units at an average density of 25.9 per square mile (10.0/km^{2}). The racial makeup of the town was 98.17% White, 0.08% African American, 0.64% Native American, 0.08% Asian, 0.48% from other races, and 0.56% from two or more races. Hispanic or Latino of any race were 0.76% of the population.

There were 959 households, out of which 33.9% had children under the age of 18 living with them, 62.0% were married couples living together, 9.5% had a female householder with no husband present, and 25.4% were non-families. 18.7% of all households were made up of individuals, and 7.2% had someone living alone who was 65 years of age or older. The average household size was 2.60 and the average family size was 2.91. In the town, the population was spread out, with 25.6% under the age of 18, 7.9% from 18 to 24, 30.4% from 25 to 44, 24.9% from 45 to 64, and 11.2% who were 65 years of age or older. The median age was 36 years. For every 100 females, there were 95.7 males. For every 100 females age 18 and over, there were 93.2 males.

The median income for a household in the town was $37,318, and the median income for a family was $41,016. Males had a median income of $31,715 versus $25,071 for females. The per capita income for the town was $16,460. About 3.7% of families and 8.0% of the population were below the poverty line, including 5.2% of those under age 18 and 8.5% of those age 65 or over.

== Government ==
=== Local government ===
The Town of Corinth has a Board of Selectmen form of Government.

=== Political makeup ===
Corinth has the second highest percentage of Republican voters among municipalities in Maine with a population over 2,000.

=== Fire Department ===
Established in 1950 after the forest fires of 1947, the department currently operates two engines, one ladder truck, two ambulances and one brush fire unit. it also has round the clock staffing, with two paramedics and a full-time fire chief.

The current Fire Chief is Scott Bragdon (1997).

== Education ==
Corinth is part of Regional School Unit No. 64.

== Notable people ==
- Arthur R. Gould (1857–1946), US senator; president of the Aroostook Valley Railroad
- Frank Mason Robinson (1845–1923), Early marketer of the drink that became known as Coca-Cola
- Henrietta Gould Rowe (1834/35–1910), litterateur, author
