= East Newport, Maine =

- Village
- Location within Maine
- Coordinates: 44°49′15″N 69°13′21″W
- Country: United States
- State: Maine
- County: Penobscot
- Elevation: 243 ft (74 m)
- Time zone: UTC-5 (Eastern (EST))
  - Summer (DST): UTC-4 (EDT)
- ZIP code: 04933
- Area code: 207
- GNIS feature ID: 579278

East Newport is an unincorporated village in the town of Newport, Penobscot County, Maine, United States. The community is located at the junction of U.S. Route 2, Maine State Route 7, and Maine State Route 100, 3.2 miles (5.1 km) east-southeast of the community of Newport. East Newport has a post office with ZIP code 04933.
