= Josiah Crosby =

Josiah Crosby may refer to:

- Josiah Crosby (diplomat)
- Josiah Crosby (politician)
