= Senator Whittemore =

Senator Whittemore may refer to:

- Benjamin Franklin Whittemore (1824–1894), South Carolina State Senate
- Rodney Whittemore (fl. 2010s), Maine State Senate
