= Louis I. Bussey School =

- U.S. National Register of Historic Places
- Location within Maine Location within the United States
- Location: U.S. 202, Dixmont, Maine
- Coordinates: 44°40′50″N 69°9′45″W
- Area: 1 acre (0.40 ha)
- Built: 1808
- Architectural style: Greek Revival
- NRHP reference No.: 76000108
- Added to NRHP: November 7, 1976

The Louis I. Bussey School is a historic school building on United States Route 202 in Dixmont, Maine. Built about 1808, it is the only surviving schoolhouse from the period of the town's early settlement. It was listed on the National Register of Historic Places in 1976.

== Description and history ==
The Bussey School is located in the rural village center of Dixmont, on the south side of US 202/Maine State Route 9, east of its junction with Maine State Route 7. It stands just west of the Dixmont Corner Church. It is a single-story wood frame structure, with a gable roof and clapboard siding. The front-facing gable extends over a porch supported by chamfered square posts, with pilasters at the building corners. There are two identical entrances, each framed by sidelight windows and a simple architrave.

The township that became Dixmont was granted in 1794 to Bowdoin College, which sold it in 1801 to Dr. Elijah Dix. In 1808 Dix gave the budding town funds for the construction of five district schools, of which this is the only one to survive. It was probably built with only modest vernacular styling of that period, its Greek Revival exterior probably the result of 1836 alterations. The school is named in honor of another community supporter. When it was listed on the National Register of Historic Places in 1976, it was owned by the Dixmont Ladies Club, and was used as a community meeting place.

== See also ==
- National Register of Historic Places listings in Penobscot County, Maine
