= Dennett Richardson =

American football player, coach, and hospital administrator (1879–1946)

Biographical details
- Born: September 12, 1879; Newport, Maine, U.S.
- Died: September 6, 1946 (aged 66); Providence, Rhode Island, U.S.

Playing career

Football
- 1898–1899: Bates
- 1902: Penn
- Position: End

Coaching career (HC unless noted)

Football
- 1903: Bates

Dennett LeRoy Richardson (September 12, 1879 – September 6, 1946) was an American hospital administrator and college football player and coach. He served as the head football coach at Bates College in 1903, before embarking on a career in medicine. Richardson was a hospital superintendent in Rhode Island.

Richardson was born on September 12, 1879, in Newport, Maine, to Dr. Leroy Richardson and Mary (Coburn) Richardson. He attended public schools in Newport before moving on to Bates, where he played football and basketball and was captain of the track team before graduating in 1900. Richardson earned a medical degree in 1905 from the University of Pennsylvania and played on the 1902 Penn Quakers football team.

Richardson was the superintendent for over 30 years at Charles V. Chapin Hospital in Providence, Rhode Island. In 1940, he took on the same role at Rhode Island Hospital, also in Providence. He died on September 6, 1946, in Providence.
