= Donald Sidney Skidgel =

US Army soldier (1948-1969)

- Army Medal of Honor
- Born: October 13, 1948; Caribou, Maine, US
- Died: September 14, 1969 (aged 20) near Sông Bé Base Camp, Song Be Province, Republic of Vietnam
- Burial place: Sawyer Cemetery, Plymouth, Maine
- Military career
- Allegiance: United States of America
- Branch: United States Army
- Service years: 1968–1969
- Rank: Sergeant
- Units: 9th Cavalry Regiment, 1st Cavalry Division
- Conflicts: Vietnam War †
- Awards: Medal of Honor; Purple Heart

Donald Sidney Skidgel (October 13, 1948 – September 14, 1969) was a United States Army soldier and a recipient of the United States military's highest decoration—the Medal of Honor—for his actions in the Vietnam War.

== Biography ==
Skidgel joined the Army from Bangor, Maine in 1968, and by September 14, 1969, was serving as a Sergeant in Troop D, 1st Squadron, 9th Cavalry Regiment, 1st Cavalry Division. On that day, near Sông Bé in the South Vietnam, during Operation Toan Thang III Skidgel's unit was guarding a convoy when it came under enemy attack. In an attempt to draw the enemy fire away from the convoy's command group, Skidgel manned a machine gun in his vehicle while his driver steered through intense fire toward the command element. Skidgel, mortally wounded during the effort, was awarded the Medal of Honor for his actions.

Skidgel, aged 20 at his death, was buried in Sawyer Cemetery, Plymouth, Maine.

== Medal of Honor citation ==
Sergeant Skidgel's official Medal of Honor citation reads:

For conspicuous gallantry and intrepidity in action at the risk of his life above and beyond the call of duty. Sgt. Skidgel distinguished himself while serving as a reconnaissance section leader in Troop D. On a road near Song Be in Binh Long Province, Sgt. Skidgel and his section with other elements of his troop were acting as a convoy security and screening force when contact occurred with an estimated enemy battalion concealed in tall grass and in bunkers bordering the road. Sgt. Skidgel maneuvered off the road and began placing effective machinegun fire on the enemy automatic weapons and rocket-propelled grenade positions. After silencing at least 1 position, he ran with his machinegun across 60 meters of bullet-swept ground to another location from which he continued to rake the enemy positions. Running low on ammunition, he returned to his vehicle over the same terrain. Moments later he was alerted that the command element was receiving intense automatic weapons, rocket-propelled grenade and mortar fire. Although he knew the road was saturated with enemy fire, Sgt. Skidgel calmly mounted his vehicle and with his driver advanced toward the command group in an effort to draw the enemy fire onto himself. Despite the hostile fire concentrated on him, he succeeded in silencing several enemy positions with his machinegun. Moments later Sgt. Skidgel was knocked down onto the rear fender by the explosion of an enemy rocket-propelled grenade. Ignoring his extremely painful wounds, he staggered back to his feet and placed effective fire on several other enemy positions until he was mortally wounded by hostile small arms fire. His selfless actions enabled the command group to withdraw to a better position without casualties and inspired the rest of his fellow soldiers to gain fire superiority and defeat the enemy. Sgt. Skidgel's gallantry at the cost of his life were in keeping with the highest traditions of the military service and reflect great credit upon himself, his unit, and the U.S. Army.

Donald Sidney Skidgel Memorial Bridge

== Donald Sidney Skidgel Memorial Bridge ==
In 2011, the bridge on Route 2 spanning the Sebasticook River in Newport, Maine was replaced and the bridge was dedicated to Skidgel's memory bearing the name "The Donald Sidney Skidgel Memorial Bridge". The renaming of the bridge to honor the Medal of Honor recipient was signed into law on May 26, 2011, by Maine Governor Paul LePage and the bridge dedication ceremony took place October 15, 2011. Among the speakers present at the dedication were Senator Susan Collins, U.S. Representative Mike Michaud, General John Libby, State Representative Kenneth Fredette and Gail Kelly representing Senator Olympia Snowe's office.

== See also ==
- List of Medal of Honor recipients
- List of Medal of Honor recipients for the Vietnam War
