= Corinth Village =

- U.S. National Register of Historic Places
- U.S. Historic district
- Location within Maine Location within the United States
- Location: Jct. Ledge Hill Rd. and W. Corinth Rd., Corinth, Maine
- Coordinates: 44°57′20″N 69°1′23″W
- Area: 225 acres (91 ha)
- Built: 1812
- Architectural style: Greek Revival, Cape Cod
- NRHP reference No.: 73000135
- Added to NRHP: June 4, 1973

Corinth Village, also known as the Skinner Settlement Historic District and West Corinth, is an early 19th-century rural crossroads village in the small town of Corinth, Maine. Centered at the junction of Ledge Hill and West Corinth Roads, the village includes a number of buildings constructed before 1850, one of which may have been the first frame structure built in the area. The village was listed as a historic district on the National Register of Historic Places in 1973.

== Description and history ==
The town of Corinth is a rural community northwest of Bangor in the interior of Maine. The town's first settler, Daniel Skinner, arrived in what is now called West Corinth, and built a log cabin in 1793. C. 1810–15 Skinner built the Cape style frame house that now stands on West Corinth Road, east of its junction with Ledge Hill Road in the northwestern portion of the town. From this modest beginning a small village grew around the crossroads, with a general store, district schoolhouse, and a handful of other farmhouses, stretched mainly along Ledge Hill Road between West Corinth and Mccard Roads. The settlement, one of four early settlements in the town, was eclipsed by East Corinth in civic importance when the town hall and first church were located in the latter village in the 1830s.

The village was economically successful until roughly the period of the American Civil War. Services included two general stores (both with meeting halls on the second floor, a tavern, blacksmith, and cooper. Industry was always at a low scale, including brief periods in which oars, carriages, and sleds for the transport of lumber were manufactured. The village in the 1840s received the town's second church, a clapboarded Greek Revival building dedicated in 1849 and little altered since. Of the commercial and industrial facilities, only one of the stores remains standing. Most of the houses are modest 1–1/2 story Cape style wood frame structures, sometimes with ells connecting them to a barn.

== See also ==
- National Register of Historic Places listings in Penobscot County, Maine
