= Henrietta Gould Rowe =

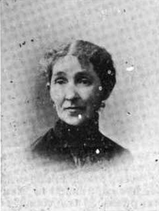
- Photo in The Magazine of Poetry, 1895
- Born: Henrietta Gould; 1835; East Corinth, Maine, U.S.
- Died: October 27, 1910 (aged 74–75)
- Other name: "Harriet"
- Occupations: litterateur, author
- Spouse: James Swett Rowe (m. 1856)
- Writing career
- Language: English
- Subject: New England

Henrietta Gould Rowe (née, Gould; 1835 – October 27, 1910) was an American author and litterateur from Maine who wrote prose and poetry about New England life and character. She began writing for publication after her marriage, contributing to periodicals such as The Youth's Companion and Wide Awake. Rowe published several books, including Re-told Tales of the Hills and Shores of Maine (1892), Queenshithe (1895), and A Maid of Bar Harbor (1902). She was also a prominent clubwoman and an educator of history and literature.

== Biography ==
Henrietta (sometimes "Harriet") Gould was born in East Corinth, Maine, 1835. (Note: Herringshaw (1914), Leonard & Marquis (1906), and Marquis (1915) record Henrietta's year of birth as 1835, while Moulton records it as 1834.) She was the daughter of Aaron and Sarah Gould. Rowe received an academic education.

She married James Swett Rowe of Bangor, Maine on October 25, 1856. After her marriage, she removed to Bangor, and resided thereafter in that city.

She began to write as soon as she could make letters on her slate, but only after her marriage did she write for publication. She did a great deal of literary work in the subsequent decades, principally prose, with an occasional poem. She wrote for The Youth's Companion, Portland Transcript, Wide Awake, and various other publications. Rowe published various volumes, including Re-told Tales of the Hills and Shores of Maine (1892); Queenshithe (1895); and A Maid of Bar Harbor (1902). As an author, she received positive recognition, and her last book did fair to out-rival her Re-Told Tales, which passed through several editions. She wrote poems and stories for many magazines, principally relating to New England life and character. She was also an educator of advanced pupils in history and literature, and a prominent clubwoman.

== Death ==
Henrietta Gould Rowe died October 27, 1910.

== Works ==
- Re-told Tales of the Hills and Shores of Maine, 1892
- Queenshithe, 1895
- A Maid of Bar Harbor, 1902
