= Newport, Maine =

- Town
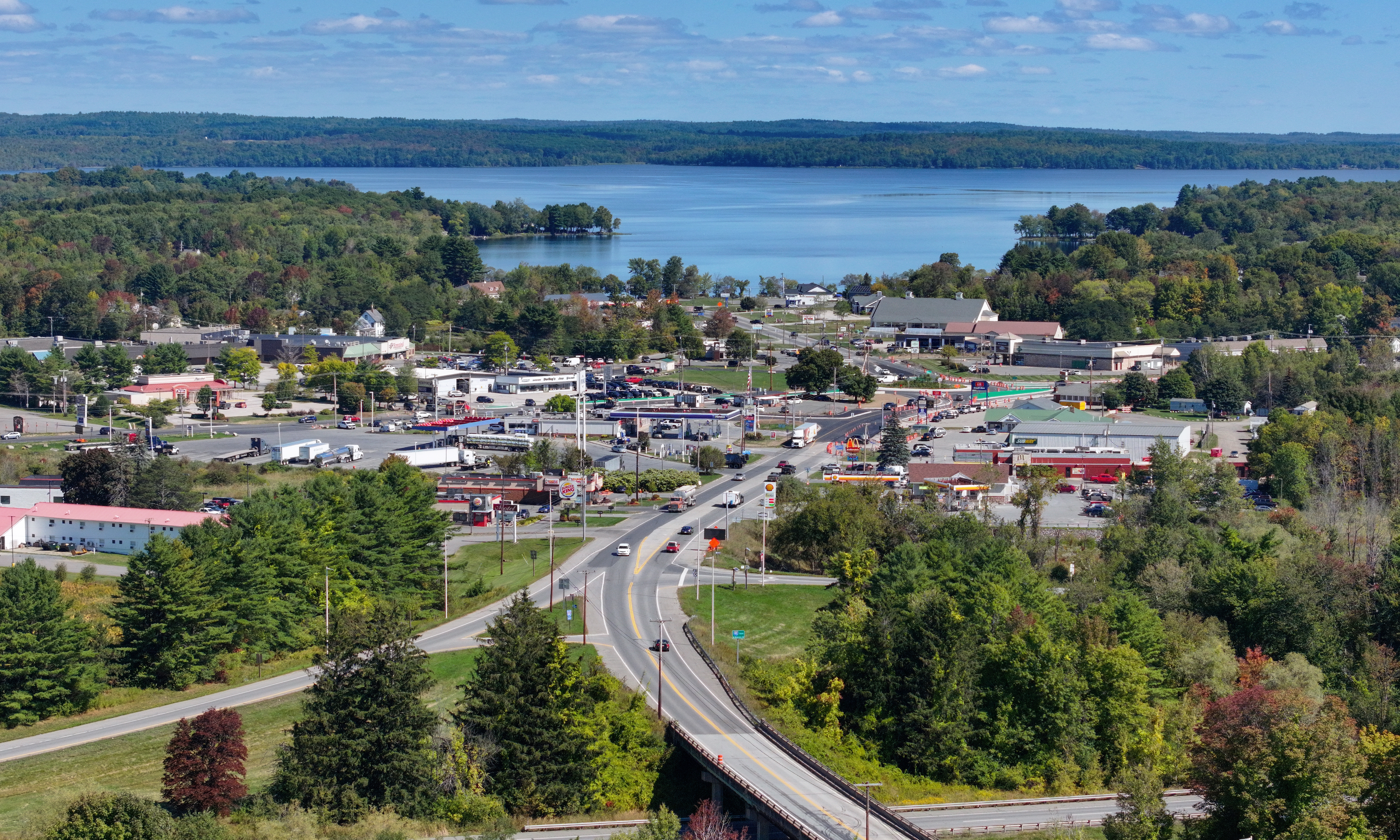
- Downtown Newport

- Seal

- Location within Maine Location within the United States
- Coordinates: 44°51′45″N 69°14′05″W
- Country: United States
- State: Maine
- County: Penobscot

Area
  - Total: 36.97 sq mi (95.75 km^{2})
  - Land: 29.50 sq mi (76.40 km^{2})
  - Water: 7.47 sq mi (19.35 km^{2})
- Elevation: 194 ft (59 m)

Population (2020)
  - Total: 3,133
  - Density: 110/sq mi (41/km^{2})
- Time zone: UTC-5 (Eastern (EST))
  - Summer (DST): UTC-4 (EDT)
- ZIP Codes: 04953 (Newport); 04933 (East Newport)
- Area code: 207
- FIPS code: 23-49065
- GNIS feature ID: 582621
- Website: newportme.org

Newport is a town in Penobscot County, Maine, United States. The population was 3,133 at the 2020 census. It contains the census-designated place of the same name. The town's borders surround the shoreline of Sebasticook Lake.

== History ==
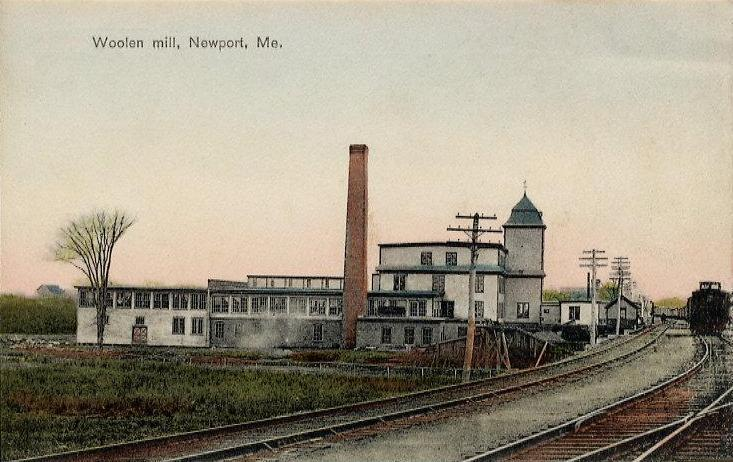
Woolen mill c. 1920

The town was settled c. 1808 as East Pond Plantation, then incorporated on June 14, 1814, as Newport. Agriculture was a principal early occupation, and industries included several sawmills, a gristmill, a foundry, cabinet shop, and a number of harness and blacksmith shops. By 1859, when the population was 1,120, Newport was an important producer of carriages "...which, for durability and finish, [were] not excelled by any in the state." The Maine Central Railroad connected to Newport and made it the terminus for its Dexter & Newport Railway, which opened in 1868. By 1880, the population reached 1,451, and industries included a marble, granite and slate works, and a maker of boots and shoes. In 1891, the woolen mill was built, and the Aroostook Condensed Milk Company founded. The latter became the Maine Condensed Milk Company in 1894, then Borden's Condensed Milk Company in 1902.

In 1936, Newport, Maine, became one of the towns to have a Movie Queen filmed in it. The Movie Queen was a half an hour silent video filmed in black and white on 16 mm film. These movies were to display all of the shops and the economy of the town. This film now lives in the Northeast Historic Film repository and is owned by the Newport Historical Committee.

In 1901, a large fire destroyed the Maine Central Railroad freight depot and two mills, and damaged 20 houses. In 1990, two boys, aged eight and nine, started a fire which burned half of Newport's historic downtown. The fire was started in the then vacant Yankee Café. The fire burned a pizzeria, auto parts store, a beauty parlor, and a baseball card shop (three buildings which were more than a century old).

In the 21st century, through the year 2020, the Vic Firth Company, subsidiary of Avedis Zildjian Company, continues to manufacture its percussion sticks and mallets in Newport.

== Geography ==
According to the United States Census Bureau, the town has a total area of 36.97 square miles (95.75 km^{2}), of which 29.50 square miles (76.40 km^{2}) is land and 7.47 square miles (19.35 km^{2}) is water. Situated on Sebasticook Lake, Newport is drained by Martin Stream and the East Branch of the Sebasticook River. Sebasticook Lake is contained entirely in the town of Newport, and is the largest lake contained in one town in the state of Maine.

The town is crossed by Interstate 95, U.S. Route 2, and state routes 7, 11, 100, and 222. It is bordered by the town of Corinna to the north, Stetson to the east, Etna and Plymouth to the south, and Palmyra to the west.

== Demographics ==
Historical population
Census	Pop.	Note	%±
1820	510		—
1830	897		75.9%
1840	1,138		26.9%
1850	1,210		6.3%
1860	1,403		16.0%
1870	1,559		11.1%
1880	1,451		−6.9%
1890	1,188		−18.1%
1900	1,533		29.0%
1910	1,747		14.0%
1920	1,709		−2.2%
1930	1,731		1.3%
1940	2,052		18.5%
1950	2,190		6.7%
1960	2,322		6.0%
1970	2,260		−2.7%
1980	2,755		21.9%
1990	3,036		10.2%
2000	3,017		−0.6%
2010	3,275		8.6%
2020	3,133		−4.3%
U.S. Decennial Census

=== 2010 census ===
As of the census of 2010, there were 3,275 people, 1,410 households, and 883 families living in the town. The population density was 111.0 inhabitants per square mile (42.9/km^{2}). There were 1,766 housing units at an average density of 59.9 per square mile (23.1/km^{2}). The racial makeup of the town was 96.4% White, 0.4% African American, 0.2% Native American, 0.5% Asian, 0.2% from other races, and 2.2% from two or more races. Hispanic or Latino of any race were 1.4% of the population.

There were 1,410 households, of which 28.5% had children under the age of 18 living with them, 46.0% were married couples living together, 11.6% had a female householder with no husband present, 5.0% had a male householder with no wife present, and 37.4% were non-families. 28.0% of all households were made up of individuals, and 11.2% had someone living alone who was 65 years of age or older. The average household size was 2.32 and the average family size was 2.83.

The median age in the town was 42.6 years. 22.1% of residents were under the age of 18; 7.7% were between the ages of 18 and 24; 24.1% were from 25 to 44; 30% were from 45 to 64; and 16.2% were 65 years of age or older. The gender makeup of the town was 48.3% male and 51.7% female.

=== 2000 census ===
As of the census of 2000, there were 3,017 people, 1,269 households, and 846 families living in the town. The population density was 102.3 inhabitants per square mile (39.5/km^{2}). There were 1,574 housing units at an average density of 53.4 per square mile (20.6/km^{2}). The racial makeup of the town was 98.28% White, 0.17% Black or African American, 0.36% Native American, 0.40% Asian, 0.03% Pacific Islander, 0.03% from other races, and 0.73% from two or more races. Hispanic or Latino of any race were 0.43% of the population.

There were 1,269 households, out of which 30.3% had children under the age of 18 living with them, 50.8% were married couples living together, 11.1% had a female householder with no husband present, and 33.3% were non-families. 27.0% of all households were made up of individuals, and 10.6% had someone living alone who was 65 years of age or older. The average household size was 2.38 and the average family size was 2.85.

In the town, the population was spread out, with 24.4% under the age of 18, 7.3% from 18 to 24, 29.3% from 25 to 44, 25.2% from 45 to 64, and 13.8% who were 65 years of age or older. The median age was 38 years. For every 100 females, there were 94.1 males. For every 100 females age 18 and over, there were 91.9 males.

The median income for a household in the town was $30,056, and the median income for a family was $37,104. Males had a median income of $28,719 versus $19,500 for females. The per capita income for the town was $15,312. About 9.1% of families and 12.7% of the population were below the poverty line, including 11.0% of those under age 18 and 13.8% of those age 65 or over.

== Notable people ==
- Lewis O. Barrows, 57th governor of Maine
- Cooper Flagg, basketball player for the Dallas Mavericks
- Kenneth Fredette, Minority Leader, Maine House of Representatives (2012–2018)
- Donald Sidney Skidgel, Medal of Honor recipient for actions in the Vietnam War
- Joshua Tardy, Minority Leader, Maine House of Representative (2006–2010)
