= Dexter Grist Mill =

- U.S. National Register of Historic Places
- Location within Maine Location within the United States
- Location: Dexter, Maine
- Coordinates: 45°1′23″N 69°17′29″W
- Area: 1 acre (0.40 ha)
- Built: 1854
- Built by: Caleb B. Curtis
- Architectural style: Vernacular Industrial
- NRHP reference No.: 75000104
- Added to NRHP: October 10, 1975

The Dexter Grist Mill, now the Dexter Historical Society Museum, is a historic 19th-century industrial property in Dexter, Maine. Built in 1854, the mill was operated by a single family for over a century, and was converted to a museum in 1967. It was listed on the National Register of Historic Places in 1975.

== Description and history ==
The Dexter Grist Mill is located in Dexter's village center, adjacent to a central parking lot located behind commercial buildings fronting on Main and Spring Streets. The mill complex includes two buildings, the main mill and the miller's house. The mill is a wood-frame structure measuring about 30 by 75 feet (9.1 m × 22.9 m), its main section two stories in height, with variety of additions. Its exterior is finished in a combination of wooden shingles and clapboards, and it rests on a foundation of piers, some brick and some stone. Its main entrance is on the north side, where a porch shelters double doors. The interior retains early 20th-century machinery, although the main water wheel that provided their power has been removed. The mill was built in 1854, although it is set on a site that had been used for milling since the early 19th century.

The miller's house stands just south of the mill. It is a 1 1/2-story wood frame Cape style structure, five bays wide, with a central chimney and clapboard and shingle siding. Built in 1838, it has Greek Revival style, with the entrance framed by sidelights and pilasters, with an entablatured lintel above.

The first mill in Dexter was started about 1801 by Samuel Elkins, at a point north of this mill's location, on the shore of Lake Wassookeag, which provided its power. The mill property was purchased in 1817 by Jonathan Farrar, who enlarged that mill's lumber capacity, and established a new grist mill at the present site. To provide power, he dug a mill pond and canal. In 1854, Farrar, in partnership with a man named Cutler, hired Caleb B. Curtis to build the present gristmill on the site. Farrar and Cutler hired James Quimby Maxwell to run the mill, and it is Maxwell's descendants who eventually bought the mill, and continued to operate and update it until its final closure in 1966. It was then acquired by the town, and deed to the local historical society for use as a museum. The mill is one of a few surviving mid-19th-century mills in the state.

== See also ==
- National Register of Historic Places listings in Penobscot County, Maine
