= Frank Mason Robinson =

Marketer and advertiser of Coca-Cola

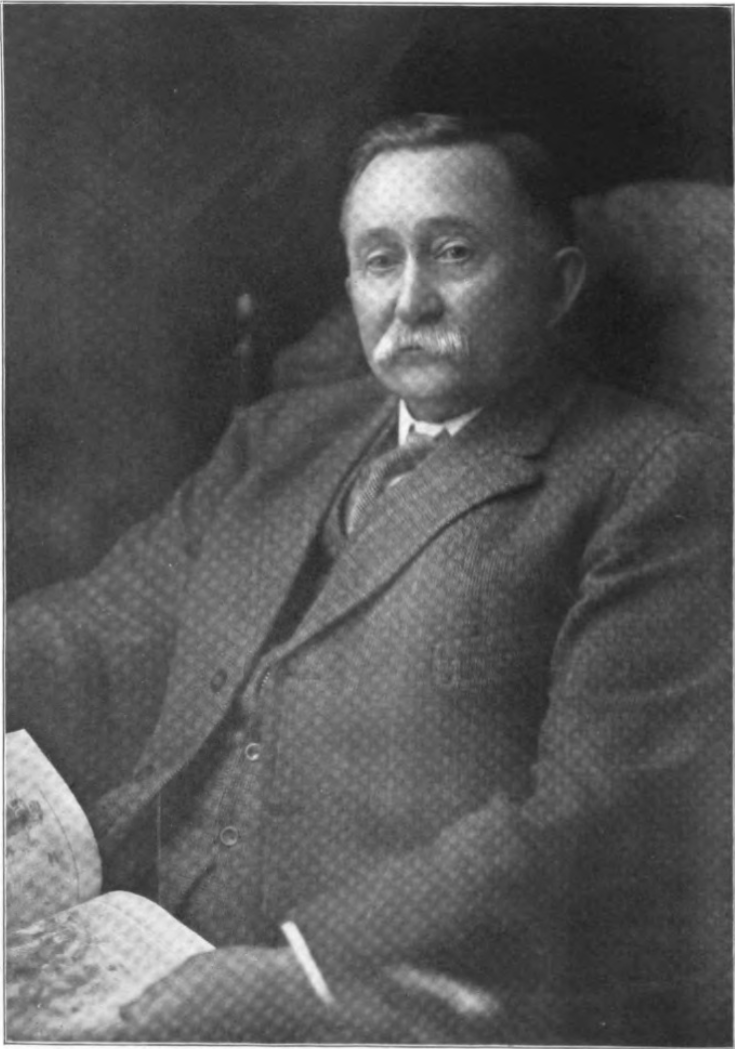
- Robinson, c. 1917
- Born: September 12, 1845; Corinth, Maine
- Died: July 8, 1923 (aged 77); Atlanta, Georgia
- Occupations: Marketer and advertiser

Signature
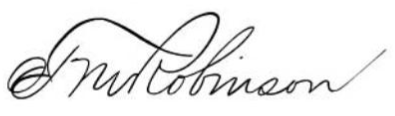

Frank Mason Robinson (September 12, 1845 – July 8, 1923) was an important early marketer and advertiser of what became known as Coca-Cola.

== Career ==
During the winter of 1885, Robinson and his business partner, David Doe, came to the South in order to sell a machine they invented called a "chromatic printing device" which had the capability to produce two colors in one imprint. Upon arrival in Atlanta, Robinson and David Doe approached Dr. John S. Pemberton, a chemist and pharmacist, and struck a deal. In 1886 Frank Robinson officially settled in Atlanta where a new business was made called the Pemberton Chemical Company consisting of Robinson, Pemberton, David Doe and Pemberton's old partner, Ed Holland.

=== Coca-Cola ===
Pemberton was experimenting with a medicinal formula which included coca leaves and kola nuts as sources of its ingredients. Robinson, who served as bookkeeper and partner to Pemberton, gave the syrup formula the name Coca-Cola, where Coca came from the coca leaves used and Cola for the kola nuts. The name Coca-Cola was also chosen "because it was euphonious, and on account of my familiarity with such names as 'S.S.S; and 'B.B.B'" said Robinson himself. He was also responsible for writing the Coca-Cola name in Spencerian script which was popular with bookkeepers of the era and remains one of the most recognized trademarks in the world.

The formula was introduced in May 1886 at the Jacobs Pharmacy in Atlanta. It sold 25 US gallons (95 L) the first year. The next year sales increased to 1,049 US gallons (3,970 L). In 1888 Pemberton sold the formula to Asa G. Candler, another Atlanta pharmacist and businessman, for a total investment of $2,300 before Pemberton died. Coca-Cola was granted a charter in 1892 and became the official Georgia Corporation named the Coca-Cola Company with Asa G. Candler, his brother John S. Candler, Frank M. Robinson and two other associates. Robinson served as treasurer and secretary and changed the Coca-Cola syrup formula so as not to include any faint traces of cocaine by the time of the Pure Food and Drug Act initiated by the Federal Government in 1906. The starting capitalization for the company was at $100,000.

Robinson overall was responsible for the early advertising of Coca-Cola before and after Candler bought the name and syrup formula from Pemberton, the first ads appearing in The Atlanta Journal in 1887. While still working with Pemberton, Robinson had the initial ads display short phrases such as "Coca-Cola! Delicious! Refreshing! Exhilarating! Invigorating! The new and popular soda fountain drink containing the properties of the wonderful Coca plant and the famous Cola nut." Marketing for the drink showed the syrup beverage with medicinal properties curing headaches but with a unique taste. The initial ads distributed invited citizens to try "the new and popular soda fountain drink." Hand painted oil cloth signs were put outside stores displaying the Coca-Cola brand name with catchy words such as "Drink" in order to inform customers and other people passing by about the new medicinal beverage that was also a soda fountain drink. First year sales showed an average of nine bottles sold per day.

Robinson later retired in 1914, but remained one of the company's directors. In The Columbus Enquirer-Sun a newspaper founded in 1874, published an article in 1906 praising Robinson's work with Coca-Cola: "there is one person to whom particular credit is due for the fact that the Coca-Cola formula remained, in the hands of the Georgians, and the further fact that the drink soon became so popular. He is Mr. Robinson, and the present secretary of the Coca-Cola Company...In developing the drink, Mr. Robinson has also developed. He is said to be one of the best posted experts on advertising in America today, all due to his experience in advertising and pushing Coca-Cola."

== Personal life ==
Originally from Maine, as a young man he was in Iowa where he married Laura Clapp. Robinson had a home in Druid Hills, an early suburb of Atlanta. He also had a 40-acre (160,000 m^{2}) country home on the Cobb County banks of the Chattahoochee River. The property had been a southern fortification defending the railroad bridge. The property is currently the Frank Mason Robinson Nature Preserve. He owned six residences which were occupied rent free by family and friends.

Robinson taught a large Bible class at the First Christian Church of Atlanta. A large English stained glass window dedicated to his memory is above the pulpit of Peachtree Christian Church. He was a Republican in national politics but a Democrat in state and local politics.

Robinson died in July 1923 and was buried in Atlanta's Westview Cemetery.
