= Brad Farrin =

American politician

Bradlee Thomas Farrin (born 1964) is an American politician from Maine. Farrin, a Republican, was first elected to the Maine House of Representatives in 2014 (District 111). Re-elected in 2016, Farrin won election to the Maine Senate in 2018 (District 3). He is a resident of Norridgewock, Maine and represents a largely rural district covering Somerset County, Maine.

Farrin ran for office after retiring from 29 years in the United States Air Force. He is an alumnus of Skowhegan Area High School and the Community College of the Air Force.

Maine House of Representatives
Preceded by Jane P. Pringle	Member of the Maine House of Representatives from the 111th district 2014–2018	Succeeded by Phillip Curtis
Maine Senate
Preceded by Rodney Whittemore	Member of the Maine Senate from the 3rd district 2018–present	Incumbent
