= Dexter Regional Airport =

- IATA: none; ICAO: none; FAA LID: 1B0

Summary
- Airport type: Public
- Owner: Town of Dexter
- Serves: Dexter, Maine
- Elevation AMSL: 533 ft (162 m)
- Coordinates: 45°00′14.9″N 069°14′13.3″W

Map
- Location of airport in Maine 1B0 (the United States)

Runways
| Direction | Length | | Surface |
| Direction | ft | m | Surface |
|---|---|---|---|
| 16/34 | 3,009 | 917 | Asphalt |
| 7/25 | 1,250 | 381 | Turf |

Statistics (2008)
- Aircraft operations: 6,963
- Based aircraft: 35
- Source: Federal Aviation Administration

Dexter Regional Airport is a public use airport in Penobscot County, Maine, United States. It is owned by the Town of Dexter and is located three nautical miles (5.56 km) east of the central business district.

== Facilities and aircraft ==
Dexter Regional Airport covers an area of 311 acres (126 ha) at an elevation of 533 feet (162 m) above mean sea level. It has two runways designated 16/34 with an asphalt surface measuring 3,009 by 80 feet (917 x 24 m) and 7/25 with a turf surface measuring 1,250 by 120 feet (381 x 37 m)

For the 12-month period ending August 10, 2008, the airport had 6,963 aircraft operations, an average of 19 per day: 100% general aviation with a few ultralights. At that time there were 35 aircraft based at this airport: 86% single-engine, 9% ultralights, 3% multi-engine, and 3% helicopters.

== See also ==
- List of airports in Maine
