= Otis O. Roberts =

Sergeant Otis O. Roberts
- Born: 20 March 1842; Sangerville, Maine
- Died: 8 February 1930 (aged 87); Dexter, Maine
- Burial place: Mount Pleasant Cemetery, Dexter, Maine
- Military career
- Allegiance: United States (Union)
- Branch: Army
- Rank: Sergeant
- Units: Company H, 6th Maine Infantry Regiment
- Conflicts: Second Battle of Rappahannock Station
- Awards: Medal of Honor

Otis O. Roberts (20 March 1842 - 8 February 1930) was a Sergeant of the United States Army who was awarded the Medal of Honor for gallantry during the American Civil War. He was awarded the medal on 28 December 1863.

== Personal life ==
Roberts was born on 20 March 1842 in Sangerville, Maine to parents Amos Roberts and Christiana Ryerson Roberts. He was one of three children. Roberts married three times, to Emelda J. Davis, Rosella Roberts, and Louise A. Hussey and fathered a total of four children. He died on 8 February 1930 in Dexter, Maine and was buried in Mount Pleasant Cemetery in Dexter.

== Military service ==
Roberts entered service in Dexter and served as a Sergeant with Company H of the 6th Maine Infantry. On 7 November 1863, at the Second Battle of Rappahannock Station, he engaged in hand-to-hand combat with the color bearer of the 8th Louisiana Infantry and was able to capture the unit's flag. For this action, he was awarded the Medal of Honor on 28 December 1863.

Roberts' Medal of Honor citation reads:

The President of the United States of America, in the name of Congress, takes pleasure in presenting the Medal of Honor to Sergeant Otis O. Roberts, United States Army, for extraordinary heroism on 7 November 1863, while serving with Company H, 6th Maine Infantry, in action at Rappahannock Station, Virginia, for capture of flag of 8th Louisiana Infantry (Confederate States of America) in a hand-to-hand struggle with the Color Bearer.

— E. M. Stanton, Secretary of War

== See also ==
- List of American Civil War Medal of Honor recipients
