= James E. Bailey (Medal of Honor) =

US Army Medal of Honor recipient (fl. 1870s)

- Born: Dexter, Maine
- Military career
- Allegiance: United States of America
- Branch: United States Army
- Rank: Sergeant
- Units: Company E, 5th Cavalry Regiment
- Conflicts: Indian Wars
- Awards: – Medal of Honor

James E. Bailey was a United States Army Sergeant during the Indian Wars who received the Medal of Honor on April 12, 1875, for service during the winter of 1872–73.

== Medal of Honor citation ==
Citation:

Gallant conduct during campaigns and engagements with Apaches.

== See also ==
- List of Medal of Honor recipients
