= Dixmont Corner Church =

Historic church in Maine, United States

- U.S. National Register of Historic Places
- 2009 photo

- Location within Maine Location within the United States
- Location: US 202, Dixmont, Maine
- Coordinates: 44°40′50″N 69°9′42″W
- Area: 0.5 acres (0.20 ha)
- Built: 1834
- Architect: Tyler, Rowland
- Architectural style: Carpenter Gothic
- NRHP reference No.: 83000468
- Added to NRHP: July 21, 1983

The Dixmont Corner Church (also known as the Dixmont Methodist Church) is a historic church on United States Route 202 in Dixmont, Maine. Built in 1834–35, it is one of the oldest churches in rural Penobscot County, and one of its earliest examples of Carpenter Gothic architecture. It was listed on the National Register of Historic Places in 1983.

== Description and history ==
The Dixmont Corner Church is located in the rural village center of Dixmont, on the south side of US 202/Maine State Route 9, east of its junction with Maine State Route 7. It is a single-story wood-frame structure, with a gabled roof and clapboard siding. The roof is surmounted by an integrated square belfry, which is topped by a low-pitch hip roof with pinnacles at the corners. The front (north-facing) facade is symmetrical, with a pair of entrances flanking a raised sash window. Each of these features is set under a separate paneled lancet-shaped arch, with lancet-shaped louvers above the doors and windows. This styling is repeated on the side windows, and the louvered openings of the belfry are also lancet-arched. A Federal style fanlight is at the center of the front gable. The interior of the building has an entrance vestibule (now partially subdivided to house offices and other facilities, a second-floor gallery, and a large open chamber with free-standing bench pews. The styling of the (original) woodwork on the balcony and altar rail is predominantly Federal. The walls and ceiling have been finished with Colonial Revival pressed tin.

The church was built in 1834-35 by Rowland Tyler, a local master builder whose only other documented work is the 1812 city hall of Bangor. It is one of Penobscot County's oldest Gothic churches, following only the brick First Congregational Church in Bangor (1831) and the Orrington Methodist Church (1832). The high quality of its workmanship and its well-proportioned exterior are relative rarities in the rural interior of Maine.

== See also ==
- National Register of Historic Places listings in Penobscot County, Maine
