= Josiah Crosby (politician) =

American politician (1818–1904)

Josiah Willis Crosby
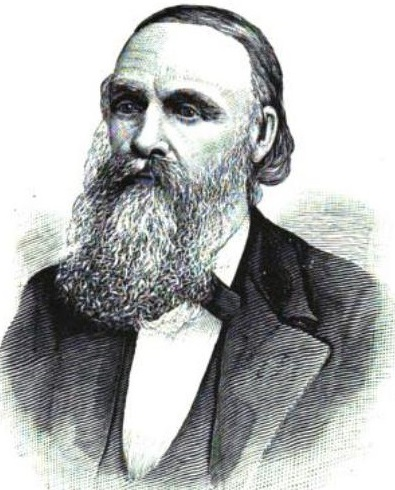
- From 1882's History of Penobscot County, Maine

Member of the Maine Senate
- In office 1867–1867
- In office 1868–1868

Personal details
- Born: November 24, 1816 Dover, New Hampshire, US
- Died: May 5, 1904 (aged 87) Dexter, Maine, YUS
- Party: Republican
- Education: Bowdoin College

Josiah Willis Crosby (November 24, 1816 – May 5, 1904) was an American lawyer and politician from Maine. As a Republican, he served in the Maine Senate during 1867 and 1868. In 1868, he served as Senate President.

Crosby was born in Dover, New Hampshire on November 24, 1816. He studied at Foxcroft Academy in Foxcroft, Maine. Despite illness, he studied law and was admitted to the Piscataquis County, Maine bar in 1838. In 1845, he moved to Dexter, Maine, where he resided for the remainder of his life. Politically, Crosby was first a Whig, then Republican, and finally a Democrat.

He represented Dexter and Corinna in the Maine House of Representatives during the 1857, 1863, and 1865 terms and Penobscot County as a whole in 1867 and 1868. A graduate of Bowdoin College, he was actively involved in his alma mater's alumni association. In 1863, he was elected a member of the Maine Historical Society. He was integral to the building of the Dexter and Newport Railroad, which was completed in 1868.

He married twice. He married Henrietta Hill in 1844. The couple had two children, both of whom died in infancy and she died in 1846. In 1849, he married Mary Bradbury Foss, the daughter of prominent attorney Simeon Foss of Dexter. The pair had nine children, seven of whom were still alive at the time of his death in 1904. One of his children, Harold J. Crosby, became a well-known composer.
