= East Branch Sebasticook River =

Location
- Country: United States

Physical characteristics
- Source
  - location: Maine
  - elevation: 200 feet (61 m)
- Mouth
  - location: Sebasticook River
  - coordinates: 44°45′38″N 69°20′09″W
  - elevation: 165 feet (50 m)
- Length: 26.7 mi (43.0 km)

The East Branch Sebasticook River is a tributary of the Sebasticook River in central Maine in the United States. It is part of the Kennebec River watershed. From the outflow of Lake Wassookeag (45°01′37″N 69°17′19″W) in Dexter, the river runs about 12.7 miles (20.4 km) south to Sebasticook Lake. From the outflow of the lake (44°50′23″N 69°16′33″W) in Newport, the river runs about 9.5 miles (15.3 km) southwest to its confluence with the Sebasticook in Detroit.

== See also ==
- List of rivers of Maine
