= Dexter, Maine =

Town in Maine, United States

- Town
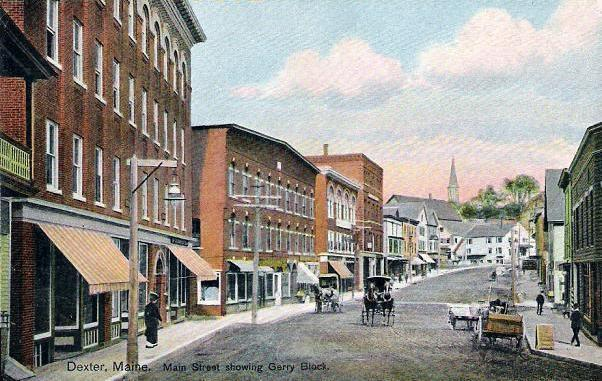
- Main Street in 1909

- Location within Maine Location within the United States
- Coordinates: 45°01′44″N 69°16′52″W
- Country: United States
- State: Maine
- County: Penobscot
- Incorporated: 1816

Area
  - Total: 37.16 sq mi (96.24 km^{2})
  - Land: 35.13 sq mi (90.99 km^{2})
  - Water: 2.03 sq mi (5.26 km^{2})
- Elevation: 466 ft (142 m)

Population (2020)
  - Total: 3,803
  - Density: 108/sq mi (41.8/km^{2})
- Time zone: UTC-5 (Eastern (EST))
  - Summer (DST): UTC-4 (EDT)
- ZIP code: 04930
- Area code: 207
- FIPS code: 23-17530
- GNIS feature ID: 582442
- Website: www.dextermaine.org

Dexter is a town in Penobscot County, Maine, United States. The population was 3,803 at the 2020 census. The town contains a census-designated place of the same name.. It is part of the Bangor metropolitan statistical area. Dexter Regional High School, which serves Dexter as well as other nearby small towns, is located in the town.

== History ==
Dexter was settled beginning in 1801 by Ebenezer Small, David Smith, and others from New Hampshire, and was originally called Elkinstown. When incorporated as a town in 1816, it named itself after Judge Samuel Dexter, who was then running for governor of Massachusetts (of which Maine was still a part). The town of Brooks in nearby Waldo County was incorporated the same year and named for the opposing candidate, John Brooks. Brooks won the election. The town of Dexter, however, achieved the greater prosperity.

The town grew because of its location on the East Branch of the Sebasticook River, which provided excellent water power for mills. In 1818, Jonathan Farrar constructed a grist mill at the falls. The Dexter Historical Society today uses the building which replaced it in 1854 as part of its museum complex. The stream would also power five woolen mills, the oldest and largest of which was established by Amos and Jeremiah Abbott in 1836. Amos Abbott & Company, which closed in 1975, was the only textile mill in the United States owned by one family for such a long period. In the 1960s, the town's name became familiar throughout New England because of the pervasive log cabin style factory outlets of the Dexter Shoe Company, founded in a vacant Dexter woolen mill in 1958 by Harold Alfond.

Dexter's downtown is dominated by the Memorial Building, designed by John Morrison. At its top is the community's largest clock, named Nancy after the architect's wife. The tallest building in town is the Unitarian Universalist Church. It is also Dexter's oldest house of worship, built in 1829, but given a new steeple and vestibule by Boston architect Thomas W. Silloway in 1869. Five buildings in Dexter are listed on the National Register of Historic Places, including the Dexter Grist Mill; Universalist Church; Abbott Memorial Library by Boston architect J. Williams Beal; the Bank Block by Bangor architect George W. Orff; and "Zion's Hill", the Ralph Owen Brewster house by Portland architectural firm J. C. & J. H. Stevens.

In 1848, the town was struck by a tornado which tore large trees out by their roots and destroyed even the strongest buildings.

In 1987, parts of Dexter's downtown area were used as backdrops for the film Creepshow 2, a horror anthology film based on stories written by Maine native Stephen King.

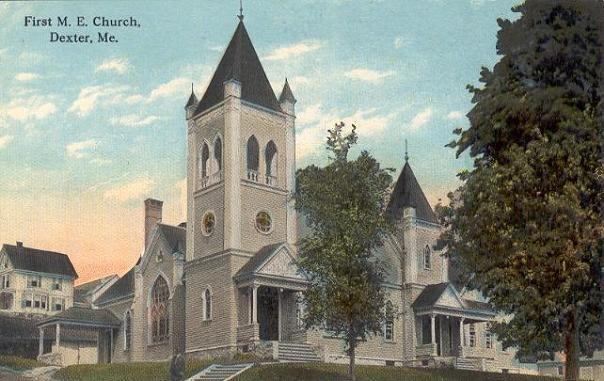
First Methodist Church c. 1910

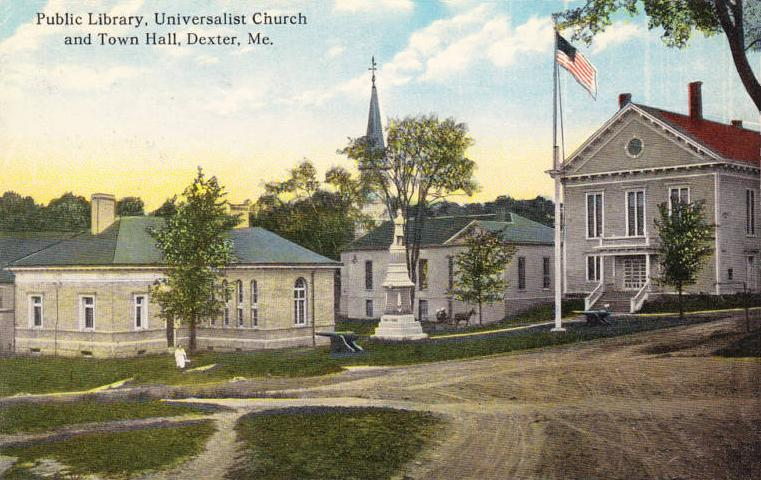
Town Hall in 1913

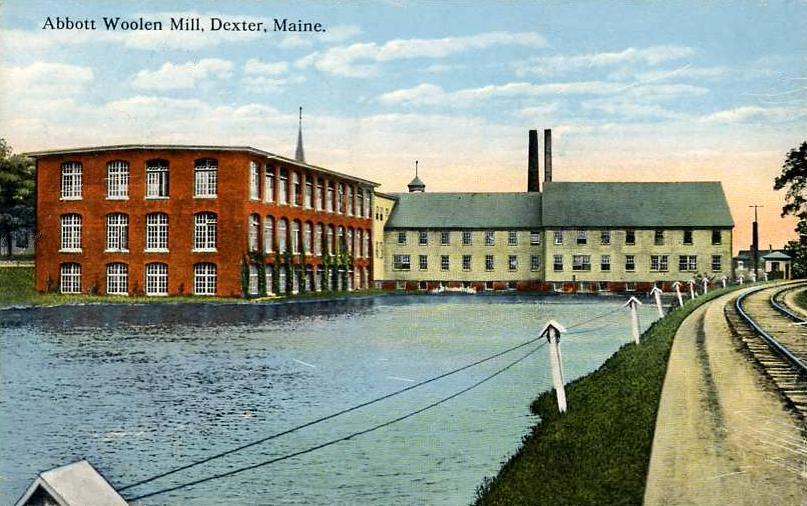
Abbott Woolen Mill c. 1912

== Geography ==
According to the United States Census Bureau, the town has a total area of 37.16 square miles (96.24 km^{2}), of which 35.13 square miles (90.99 km^{2}) is land and 2.03 square miles (5.26 km^{2}) is water. Dexter is drained by the East Branch of the Sebasticook River, which flows from Lake Wassookeag and is part of the Kennebec River watershed.

== Demographics ==
Historical population
Census	Pop.	Note	%±
1820	461		—
1830	885		92.0%
1840	1,464		65.4%
1850	1,948		33.1%
1860	2,363		21.3%
1870	2,875		21.7%
1880	2,563		−10.9%
1890	2,732		6.6%
1900	2,941		7.7%
1910	3,530		20.0%
1920	4,113		16.5%
1930	4,063		−1.2%
1940	3,714		−8.6%
1950	4,126		11.1%
1960	3,951		−4.2%
1970	3,725		−5.7%
1980	4,286		15.1%
1990	4,419		3.1%
2000	3,890		−12.0%
2010	3,895		0.1%
2020	3,803		−2.4%
U.S. Decennial Census

=== 2010 census ===
As of the census of 2010, there were 3,895 people, 1,651 households, and 1,064 families living in the town. The population density was 110.9 inhabitants per square mile (42.8/km^{2}). There were 2,141 housing units at an average density of 60.9 per square mile (23.5/km^{2}). The racial makeup of the town was 97.2% White, 0.3% African American, 0.7% Native American, 0.5% Asian, and 1.3% from two or more races. Hispanic or Latino of any race were 1.1% of the population.

There were 1,651 households, of which 28.4% had children under the age of 18 living with them, 45.9% were married couples living together, 13.3% had a female householder with no husband present, 5.3% had a male householder with no wife present, and 35.6% were non-families. 28.5% of all households were made up of individuals, and 11.9% had someone living alone who was 65 years of age or older. The average household size was 2.31 and the average family size was 2.77.

The median age in the town was 44.8 years. 21.4% of residents were under the age of 18; 7.2% were between the ages of 18 and 24; 21.6% were from 25 to 44; 31.3% were from 45 to 64; and 18.5% were 65 years of age or older. The gender makeup of the town was 48.0% male and 52.0% female.

=== 2000 census ===
As of the census of 2000, there were 3,890 people, 1,615 households, and 1,106 families living in the town. The population density was 110.6 inhabitants per square mile (42.7/km^{2}). There were 2,054 housing units at an average density of 58.4 per square mile (22.5/km^{2}). The racial makeup of the town was 98.56% White, 0.31% Black or African American, 0.23% Native American, 0.10% Asian, 0.03% Pacific Islander, 0.03% from other races, and 0.75% from two or more races. Hispanic or Latino of any race were 0.64% of the population.

There were 1,615 households, out of which 29.5% had children under the age of 18 living with them, 52.5% were married couples living together, 11.2% had a female householder with no husband present, and 31.5% were non-families. 26.6% of all households were made up of individuals, and 13.4% had someone living alone who was 65 years of age or older. The average household size was 2.36 and the average family size was 2.80.

In the town, the population was spread out, with 23.7% under the age of 18, 6.7% from 18 to 24, 26.1% from 25 to 44, 26.1% from 45 to 64, and 17.4% who were 65 years of age or older. The median age was 41 years. For every 100 females, there were 90.2 males. For every 100 females age 18 and over, there were 87.1 males.

The median income for a household in the town was $26,000, and the median income for a family was $31,204. Males had a median income of $27,130 versus $18,805 for females. The per capita income for the town was $14,197. About 15.4% of families and 17.8% of the population were below the poverty line, including 28.7% of those under age 18 and 9.7% of those age 65 or over.

== Sites of interest ==
- Abbott Museum (1836)
- Grist Mill Museum (1854)
- Miller's House (1825)
- Carr Schoolhouse (1845)

== Notable people ==
- Jere Abbott, museum director
- Harold Alfond, businessman
- Justin Alfond, state senator
- James E. Bailey, military officer
- Ralph Owen Brewster, senator and 54th governor of Maine
- William E. Brewster, banker and politician
- Dean Clukey, state senator
- Jeff Coffin, musician
- Joseph T. Copeland, judge
- Dean Cray, politician
- Harold J. Crosby, musician
- Josiah Crosby, politician
- Lysander Cutler, state senator and military officer
- Frances Lewis Brackett Damon, writer
- Paul Davis, state senator
- Holman Day, writer
- Steven D. Foster, state legislator
- Sterling Hayden, actor
- L. Isabel Heald, social leader and philanthropic worker
- Patricia Millett, judge
- F. F. Proctor, vaudeville impresario
- Otis O. Roberts, military officer
- Harry Orman Robinson, college football coach
- Charles Treat, military officer
- Hiram Tuttle, Olympian equestrian
- Hattie Whitten, criminal

== See also ==
- Dexter Regional Airport
