= Carmel, Maine =

Town in Maine, United States

- Town
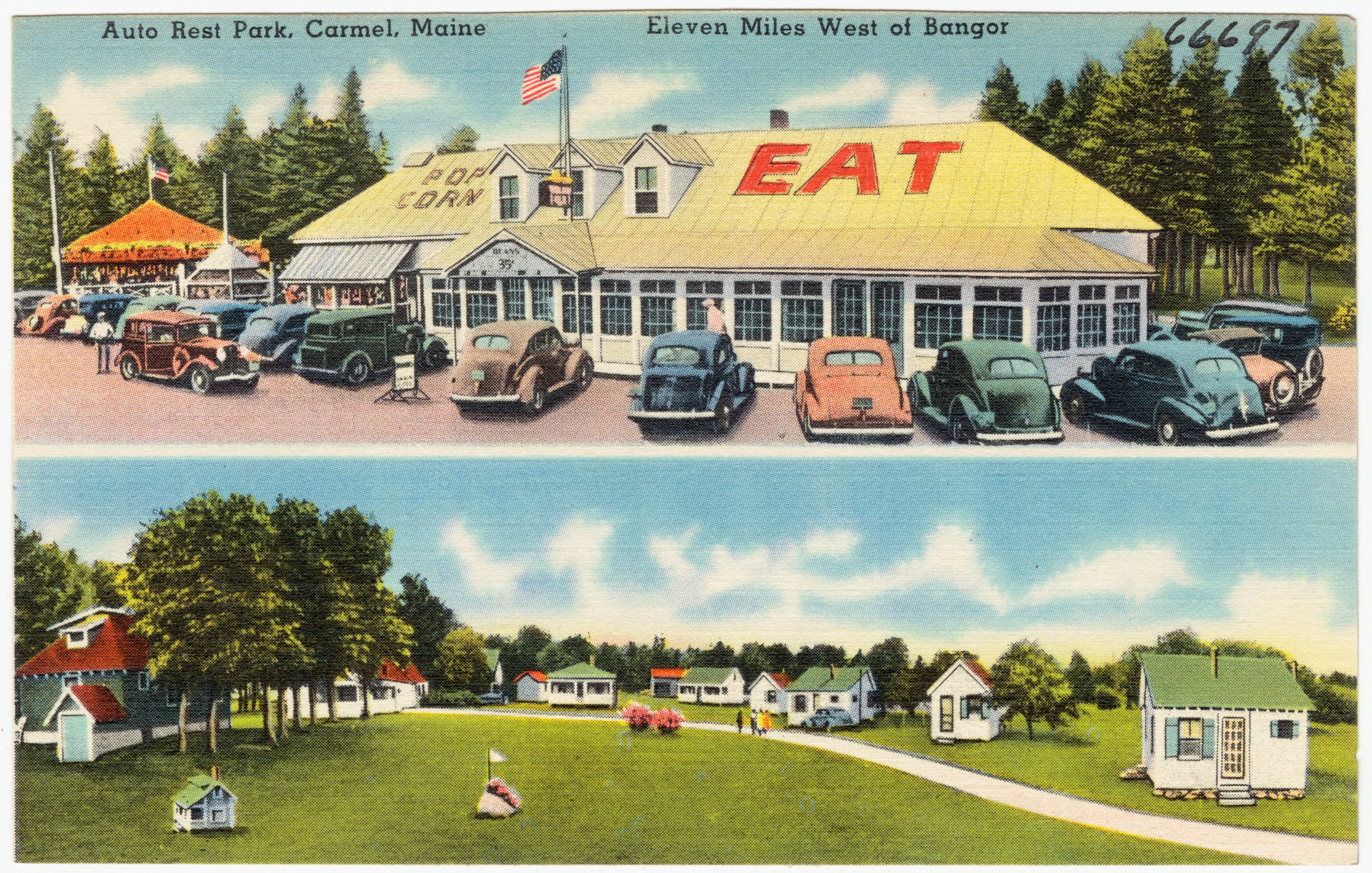
- 1930s postcard

- Seal

- Location within Maine Location within the United States
- Coordinates: 44°46′38″N 69°02′32″W
- Country: United States
- State: Maine
- County: Penobscot

Area
  - Total: 36.90 sq mi (95.57 km^{2})
  - Land: 36.53 sq mi (94.61 km^{2})
  - Water: 0.37 sq mi (0.96 km^{2})
- Elevation: 131 ft (40 m)

Population (2020)
  - Total: 2,867
  - Density: 78/sq mi (30.3/km^{2})
- Time zone: UTC-5 (Eastern (EST))
  - Summer (DST): UTC-4 (EDT)
- ZIP code: 04419
- Area code: 207
- FIPS code: 23-10670
- GNIS feature ID: 582390
- Website: www.townofcarmel.org

Carmel is a town in Penobscot County, Maine, United States. It is part of the Bangor Metropolitan Statistical Area. The population was 2,867 at the 2020 census.

== Geography ==
According to the United States Census Bureau, the town has a total area of 36.90 square miles (95.57 km^{2}), of which 36.53 square miles (94.61 km^{2}) is land and 0.37 square miles (0.96 km^{2}) is water. The center of town is located at the intersection of U.S. Route 2 and Maine State Route 100 with Maine State Route 69. Interstate 95 passes east–west through the southern portion of town, with access via exits 167 and 174, both outside the town boundary.

Souadabscook Stream is the main waterway through the town, flowing east to the Penobscot River in Hampden. This waterway was used by the indigenous people of Maine for thousands of years to traverse between the Penobscot and Kennebec River systems on canoes.

== History ==
Martin Kinsley of Hampden bought this township in 1795 and began selling lots. The first settlers were Abel Ruggles and the Rev. Paul Ruggles, who named the place to honor the prophet Elijah's experience on Mount Carmel. It was incorporated as a town in 1811.

== Demographics ==
Historical population
Census	Pop.	Note	%±
1820	153		—
1830	257		68.0%
1840	520		102.3%
1850	1,225		135.6%
1860	1,271		3.8%
1870	1,348		6.1%
1880	1,220		−9.5%
1890	1,066		−12.6%
1900	932		−12.6%
1910	1,050		12.7%
1920	918		−12.6%
1930	881		−4.0%
1940	870		−1.2%
1950	996		14.5%
1960	1,206		21.1%
1970	1,301		7.9%
1980	1,695		30.3%
1990	1,906		12.4%
2000	2,416		26.8%
2010	2,794		15.6%
2020	2,867		2.6%
U.S. Decennial Census

=== 2010 census ===
As of the census of 2010, there were 2,794 people, 1,097 households, and 818 families living in the town. The population density was 76.5 inhabitants per square mile (29.5/km^{2}). There were 1,182 housing units at an average density of 32.4 per square mile (12.5/km^{2}). The racial makeup of the town was 97.6% White, 0.5% African American, 0.5% Native American, 0.2% Asian, 0.3% from other races, and 0.9% from two or more races. Hispanic or Latino of any race were 0.8% of the population.

There were 1,097 households, of which 34.5% had children under the age of 18 living with them, 59.5% were married couples living together, 9.3% had a female householder with no husband present, 5.7% had a male householder with no wife present, and 25.4% were non-families. 19.4% of all households were made up of individuals, and 7% had someone living alone who was 65 years of age or older. The average household size was 2.55 and the average family size was 2.90.

The median age in the town was 40.5 years. 23% of residents were under the age of 18; 7.1% were between the ages of 18 and 24; 26.3% were from 25 to 44; 30.6% were from 45 to 64; and 13% were 65 years of age or older. The gender makeup of the town was 50.3% male and 49.7% female.

=== 2000 census ===
As of the census of 2000, there were 2,416 people, 932 households, and 707 families living in the town. The population density was 66.1 inhabitants per square mile (25.5/km^{2}). There were 995 housing units at an average density of 27.2 per square mile (10.5/km^{2}). The racial makeup of the town was 98.18% White, 0.17% African American, 0.29% Native American, 0.37% Asian, 0.08% from other races, and 0.91% from two or more races. Hispanic or Latino of any race were 0.33% of the population.

There were 932 households, out of which 37.7% had children under the age of 18 living with them, 62.6% were married couples living together, 8.5% had a female householder with no husband present, and 24.1% were non-families. 16.4% of all households were made up of individuals, and 6.2% had someone living alone who was 65 years of age or older. The average household size was 2.59 and the average family size was 2.89.

In the town, the population was spread out, with 26.0% under the age of 18, 6.6% from 18 to 24, 32.9% from 25 to 44, 24.9% from 45 to 64, and 9.6% who were 65 years of age or older. The median age was 38 years. For every 100 females, there were 101.5 males. For every 100 females age 18 and over, there were 95.4 males.

The median income for a household in the town was $37,645, and the median income for a family was $41,474. Males had a median income of $31,354 versus $21,176 for females. The per capita income for the town was $15,597. About 9.8% of families and 11.4% of the population were below the poverty line, including 13.8% of those under age 18 and 16.2% of those age 65 or over.

== Notable people ==
- Myrna Fahey (1933–1973), actress
- Amory Nelson Hardy, photographer
- Emory A. Hebard, Member of the Vermont House of Representatives
- James E. Thorne, state legislator
