= Sebasticook River =

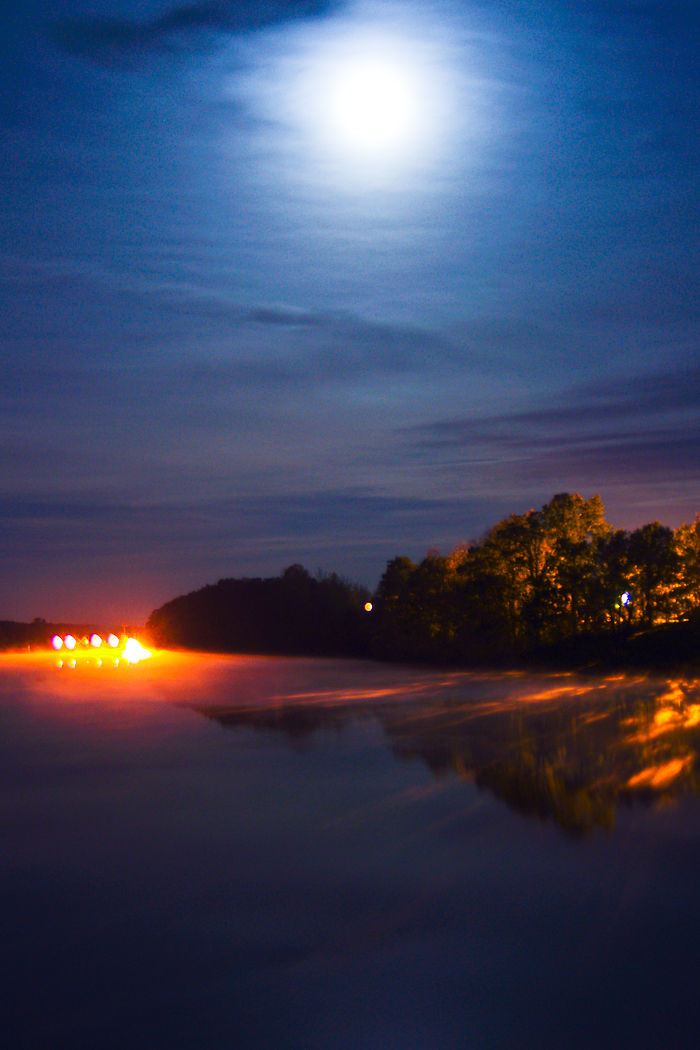

Location
- Country: United States

Physical characteristics
- Source
  - location: Maine
  - elevation: 750 feet (230 m)
- Mouth
  - location: Kennebec River
  - coordinates: 44°32′19″N 69°37′54″W
  - elevation: 32 feet (10 m)
- Length: 76 mi (122 km)

Basin features
- Tributaries
  - left: East Branch Sebasticook River

The Sebasticook River is a 76-mile-long (122 km) river in the central part of Maine, in the United States. From its source (45°03′17″N 69°13′36″W) in Dexter, the upper "Main Stream" section flows generally west and south 30 miles (48 km) to Great Moose Lake. From the outlet of the lake in Hartland, the Sebasticook flows 41 miles (66 km) south to the Kennebec River in Winslow.

According to the Sebasticook Regional Land Trust:

The Sebasticook River is the largest tributary (985 square miles) to the Kennebec and thus plays an important role in the restoration of both the anadromous and resident aquatic fisheries of the Kennebec basin and the Gulf of Maine ecosystem. Due to its relatively close proximity to the lower Kennebec, large drainage area, and low gradient, this watershed historically contributed a major percentage of available spawning and nursery habitat for anadromous runs of alewife, blueback herring, American shad, rainbow smelt, and striped bass associated with the Kennebec River watershed and Gulf of Maine ecosystems. To a lesser extent, the river provided habitat for Atlantic salmon.

== Great Moose Lake ==
Great Moose Lake
- Location within Maine
- Location: Somerset County, Maine
- Coordinates: 44°55′N 69°31′W
- Basin countries: United States
- Max. length: 5 mi (8.0 km)
- Max. width: 1.5 mi (2.4 km)
- Surface area: 3,856 acres (1,560 ha)
- Max. depth: 50 feet (15 m)
- Water volume: 52,697 acre⋅ft (65,001,000 m^{3})
- Surface elevation: 243 ft (74 m)

Great Moose Lake (formerly known as Moose Pond) is the second-largest lake in the Sebasticook River watershed, and the largest on the main stem of the river. The lake is a good habitat for smallmouth bass, white perch, chain pickerel, and rainbow smelt. Lake tributaries Black Stream, Wichee Brook, Brown Brook, Higgins Brook, Goodwin Brook, and Little Ferguson Brook provide smelt spawning habitat. Despite marginal summer conditions of warm surface waters and low dissolved oxygen concentrations below the 7-metre (23 ft) thermocline, the Maine Department of Inland Fisheries and Wildlife has attempted to stock the lake with salmon.

== See also ==
- List of rivers of Maine
