= Rodney Whittemore =

American politician and businessman

Rodney L. Whittemore

Member of the Maine Senate from the 3rd district
- In office 2010 – December 5, 2018
- Preceded by: Peter Mills
- Succeeded by: Brad Farrin

Personal details
- Born: Skowhegan, Maine
- Party: Republican
- Spouse: Coralee Whittemore
- Profession: Businessperson
- Website: Official Website

Rodney L. Whittemore is an American politician and businessperson from Maine. Thomas is a Republican State Senator from Maine's 26th District, representing all of Somerset County, including the population centers of Fairfield and Skowhegan. He was born and raised in Skowhegan and owns a small business selling and servicing outdoor power equipment. He also spent six years in the Army National Guard. Whittemore serves on the Skowhegan Planning Board and formerly served as chairman of the Skowhegan Sewer and Water Committee.
