= Dixmont, Maine =

Town in Maine, United States

- Town
- Motto: "The Best Town in Maine!"
- Location within Maine Location within the United States
- Coordinates: 44°41′46″N 69°07′29″W
- Country: United States
- State: Maine
- County: Penobscot

Area
  - Total: 36.43 sq mi (94.35 km^{2})
  - Land: 36.29 sq mi (93.99 km^{2})
  - Water: 0.14 sq mi (0.36 km^{2})
- Elevation: 564 ft (172 m)

Population (2020)
  - Total: 1,211
  - Density: 33/sq mi (12.9/km^{2})
- Time zone: UTC−5 (Eastern (EST))
  - Summer (DST): UTC−4 (EDT)
- ZIP Code: 04932
- Area code: 207
- FIPS code: 23-17950
- GNIS feature ID: 582444
- Website: www.townofdixmont.org

Dixmont is a town in Penobscot County, Maine, United States. The population was 1,211 at the 2020 census. It is part of the Bangor Metropolitan Statistical Area.

== History ==
Dixmont was originally granted by the Commonwealth of Massachusetts (of which Maine was then a part) to Bowdoin College, which sold the first settlers their land. For that reason it was initially called "Collegetown". The first settlement was made in 1799.

One of the largest purchasers of land in Collegetown was Dr. Elijah Dix of Boston, who never lived there but took an interest in its settlement. When the town was incorporated in 1807, it named itself after Dix. A "malignant fever" broke out among the settlers that same year, killing many of them. Still, the population grew in the decade 1800–1810 from 59 to 337, a rate of increase never repeated. Dr. Dix also died in Dixmont on a trip there in 1809, and was buried in the Dixmont Corner Cemetery.

Dix was the grandfather of reformer Dorothea Dix, who was born in nearby Hampden. Her father was probably the family's land agent, overseeing settlement in Dixmont. Dixfield, Maine, in Oxford County, is also named after Dr. Dix.

Dixmont was on the main stage-coach route between Bangor and Augusta, and given that it had the highest elevation along that road, it became a natural rest-stop for tired horses. Wrote William Lloyd Garrison in 1832: "The Dixmont Hills are famous and formidable along this route . . . they are piled upon my memory in all their massive mobility."

By the 1850s the population of the town had peaked at over 1,600, which is over 400 more than it has today. It had three sawmills, a shingle mill, two flour and grist mills, and many productive farms.

In the 1870s there were two small corporations in Dixmont making cheese, one owned by L.P. Toothacker, and the other by Benjamin Bussey. In 1880 Dixmont had two hotels and one physician. Sheep farming was popular, probably because of the hilly landscape. In 1880, Dixmont had more sheep than any town in Penobscot County.

A rare earthquake shook North Dixmont (and Unity, Albion, Plymouth, and Weeks Mills) in 1895 but no damage was reported.

By 1900, the population of Dixmont was down to 843.

== Geography ==
Dixmont's highest hills are Peaked Mountain and Mount Harris, the latter 1,230 feet (370 m) above sea level. In 1854 the United States Coast Survey erected an observatory on top of Mount Harris.

Like many Maine towns, Dixmont has multiple villages. The four main ones are Dixmont Corner, North Dixmont, East Dixmont, and Dixmont Center.

According to the United States Census Bureau, the town has a total area of 36.43 square miles (94.35 km^{2}), of which 36.29 square miles (93.99 km^{2}) is land and 0.14 square miles (0.36 km^{2}) is water.

== Demographics ==
Historical population
Census	Pop.	Note	%±
1810	337		—
1820	515		52.8%
1830	945		83.5%
1840	1,498		58.5%
1850	1,605		7.1%
1860	1,442		−10.2%
1870	1,309		−9.2%
1880	1,132		−13.5%
1890	919		−18.8%
1900	843		−8.3%
1910	757		−10.2%
1920	602		−20.5%
1930	538		−10.6%
1940	576		7.1%
1950	631		9.5%
1960	551		−12.7%
1970	559		1.5%
1980	812		45.3%
1990	1,007		24.0%
2000	1,065		5.8%
2010	1,181		10.9%
2020	1,211		2.5%
U.S. Decennial Census

=== 2010 census ===
As of the census of 2010, there were 1,181 people, 498 households, and 354 families living in the town. The population density was 32.5 inhabitants per square mile (12.5/km^{2}). There were 557 housing units at an average density of 15.3 per square mile (5.9/km^{2}). The racial makeup of the town was 98.6% White, 0.1% African American, 0.6% Native American, 0.2% Asian, and 0.5% from two or more races. Hispanic or Latino of any race were 0.8% of the population.

There were 498 households, of which 26.5% had children under the age of 18 living with them, 58.2% were married couples living together, 8.2% had a female householder with no husband present, 4.6% had a male householder with no wife present, and 28.9% were non-families. 21.3% of all households were made up of individuals, and 6.8% had someone living alone who was 65 years of age or older. The average household size was 2.37 and the average family size was 2.75.

The median age in the town was 44.8 years. 20.3% of residents were under the age of 18; 5.8% were between the ages of 18 and 24; 24.2% were from 25 to 44; 35.7% were from 45 to 64; and 13.9% were 65 years of age or older. The gender makeup of the town was 50.3% male and 49.7% female.

=== 2000 census ===
As of the census of 2000, there were 1,065 people, 411 households, and 314 families living in the town. The population density was 29.3 inhabitants per square mile (11.3/km^{2}). There were 474 housing units at an average density of 13.0 per square mile (5.0/km^{2}). The racial makeup of the town was 98.59% White, 0.38% Native American, 0.47% Asian, and 0.56% from two or more races. Hispanic or Latino of any race were 0.19% of the population.

There were 411 households, out of which 33.3% had children under the age of 18 living with them, 63.0% were married couples living together, 8.3% had a female householder with no husband present, and 23.6% were non-families. 17.5% of all households were made up of individuals, and 7.1% had someone living alone who was 65 years of age or older. The average household size was 2.59 and the average family size was 2.88.

In the town, the population was spread out, with 24.2% under the age of 18, 5.4% from 18 to 24, 31.5% from 25 to 44, 29.0% from 45 to 64, and 9.9% who were 65 years of age or older. The median age was 39 years. For every 100 females, there were 100.9 males. For every 100 females age 18 and over, there were 100.2 males.

The median income for a household in the town was $33,654, and the median income for a family was $36,607. Males had a median income of $29,844 versus $26,000 for females. The per capita income for the town was $15,826. About 14.1% of families and 16.1% of the population were below the poverty line, including 27.5% of those under age 18 and 16.0% of those age 65 or over.

== Historic buildings ==
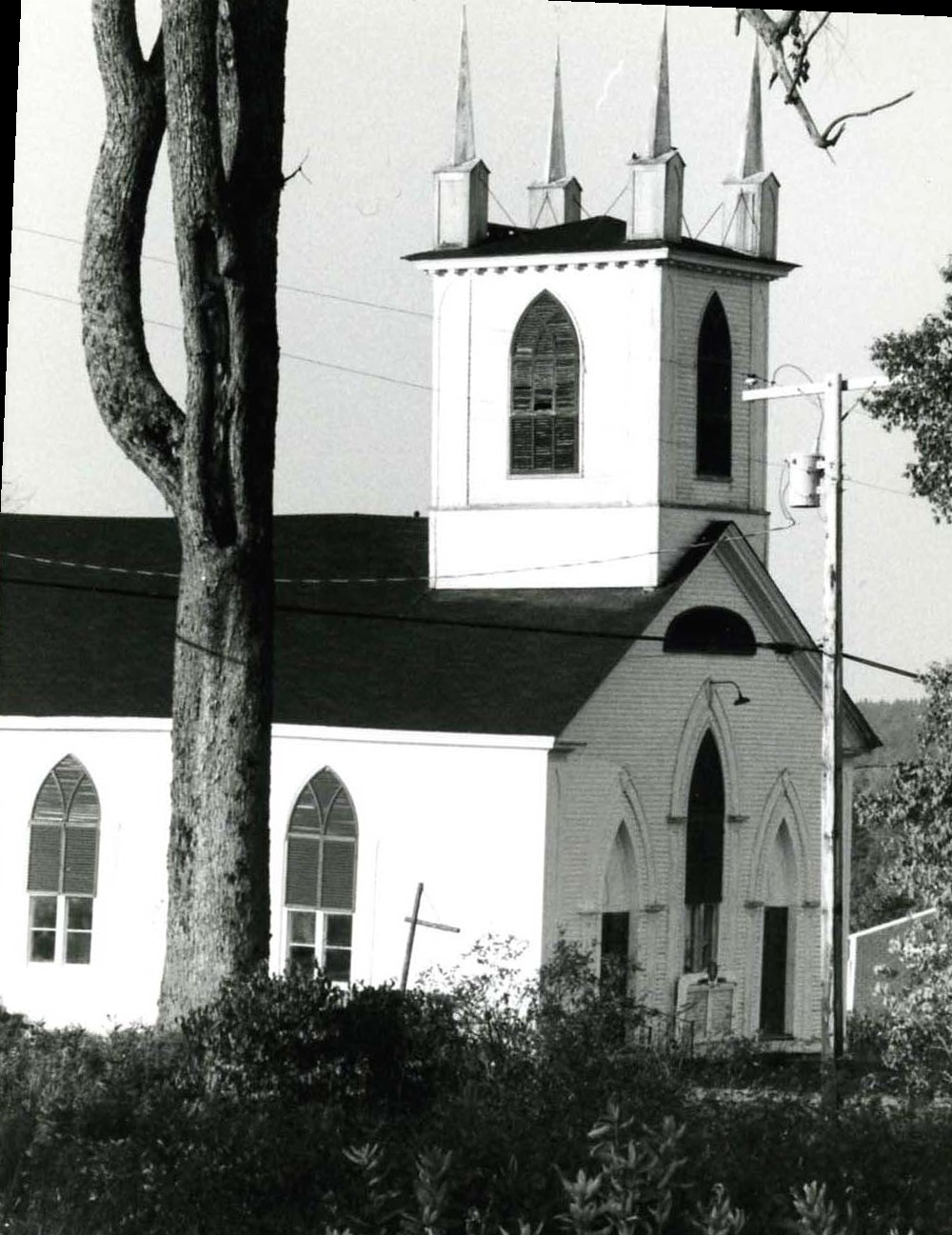
Dixmont Corner Church (1835)

Two Dixmont buildings are listed on the National Register of Historic Places: the Carpenter Gothic-style Dixmont Corner Church (also known as the Dixmont Methodist Church), designed and built by Rowland Tyler in 1835; and the Louis I. Bussey School of 1808. Tyler also built the first Penobscot County Courthouse in Bangor, which does not survive.

== Education ==
Dixmont shares an elementary school with the nearby town of Etna (called Etna-Dixmont School) but has no high school. Dixmonters attend high school in nearby Newport (Nokomis Regional High School) or Bangor (John Bapst Memorial High School or Bangor High School).

== Notable people ==
- Melville Sewell Bagley American businessman immigrant to Argentina founder Hesperidina
- Samuel Butman (1788–1864), US congressman (1827–1831), president of the Maine state Senate (1853)
- Coker F. Clarkson (1811–1890), Iowa senator and agricultural journalist
- Jonathan G. Hunton, 9th governor of Maine
- Sawin Millett, Maine state representative
- Frank Addison Porter, classical composer
- Benjamin Franklin Upton, photographer
- Abner Weed (1842–1917), founded the town of Weed, California; California state senator (1907–1909)
