= Exeter, Maine =

Town in Maine, United States

- Town
- Seal

- Location within Maine Location within the United States
- Coordinates: 45°00′12″N 69°07′20″W
- Country: United States
- State: Maine
- County: Penobscot

Area
  - Total: 38.59 sq mi (99.95 km^{2})
  - Land: 38.56 sq mi (99.87 km^{2})
  - Water: 0.031 sq mi (0.08 km^{2})
- Elevation: 243 ft (74 m)

Population (2020)
  - Total: 963
  - Density: 25/sq mi (9.6/km^{2})
- Time zone: UTC-5 (Eastern (EST))
  - Summer (DST): UTC-4 (EDT)
- ZIP code: 04435
- Area code: 207
- FIPS code: 23-24110
- GNIS feature ID: 582470
- Website: Town website

Exeter is a town in Penobscot County, Maine, United States. The population was 963 at the 2020 census.

== Geography ==
According to the United States Census Bureau, the town has a total area of 38.59 square miles (99.95 km^{2}), of which 38.56 square miles (99.87 km^{2}) is land and 0.03 square miles (0.08 km^{2}) is water.

== History ==
In 1793 the Commonwealth of Massachusetts granted the township to Marblehead Academy of Marblehead, Massachusetts. The township was lotted in 1800 by Moses Hodsdon of Kenduskeag. Dr. John Blaisdell acted as agent for early proprietors. Among the proprietors were Benjamin Jay and William Turner of Boston. The first settlement was made in 1801 by Lemuel Tozier. Prior to incorporation the town was known as "Blaisdelltown".

The town incorporated on February 16, 1811. The name "Exeter" was selected in memory of Exeter, New Hampshire, from which some settlers had moved. The first school was taught by Miss Anna M. Stevens in 1804. The first mill was built by Levi Stevens in 1813.

In 1859 the town had a population of 1,853. By 1880 the population had dropped to 1,274. The United States Census reported a population of 1,092 in 2010.

== Demographics ==
Historical population
Census	Pop.	Note	%±
1820	582		—
1830	1,439		147.3%
1840	2,052		42.6%
1850	1,853		−9.7%
1860	1,783		−3.8%
1870	1,424		−20.1%
1880	1,274		−10.5%
1890	939		−26.3%
1900	879		−6.4%
1910	888		1.0%
1920	807		−9.1%
1930	773		−4.2%
1940	751		−2.8%
1950	734		−2.3%
1960	707		−3.7%
1970	663		−6.2%
1980	823		24.1%
1990	937		13.9%
2000	997		6.4%
2010	1,092		9.5%
2020	963		−11.8%
U.S. Decennial Census

=== 2010 census ===
As of the census of 2010, there were 1,092 people, 424 households, and 301 families living in the town. The population density was 28.3 inhabitants per square mile (10.9/km^{2}). There were 491 housing units at an average density of 12.7 per square mile (4.9/km^{2}). The racial makeup of the town was 97.9% White, 0.5% Native American, 0.3% Asian, and 1.3% from two or more races. Hispanic or Latino of any race were 1.1% of the population.

There were 424 households, of which 29.7% had children under the age of 18 living with them, 57.8% were married couples living together, 8.5% had a female householder with no husband present, 4.7% had a male householder with no wife present, and 29.0% were non-families. 20.3% of all households were made up of individuals, and 6.9% had someone living alone who was 65 years of age or older. The average household size was 2.58 and the average family size was 2.97.

The median age in the town was 44 years. 22.2% of residents were under the age of 18; 5.7% were between the ages of 18 and 24; 24.5% were from 25 to 44; 35.4% were from 45 to 64; and 12.3% were 65 years of age or older. The gender makeup of the town was 48.6% male and 51.4% female.

=== 2000 census ===
As of the census of 2000, there were 997 people, 389 households, and 296 families living in the town. The population density was 26.0 inhabitants per square mile (10.0/km^{2}). There were 452 housing units at an average density of 11.8 per square mile (4.6/km^{2}). The racial makeup of the town was 99.00% White, 0.80% Native American, and 0.20% from two or more races. Hispanic or Latino of any race were 0.10% of the population.

There were 389 households, out of which 29.6% had children under the age of 18 living with them, 64.5% were married couples living together, 7.5% had a female householder with no husband present, and 23.9% were non-families. 18.3% of all households were made up of individuals, and 6.9% had someone living alone who was 65 years of age or older. The average household size was 2.56 and the average family size was 2.87.

In the town, the population was spread out, with 22.7% under the age of 18, 6.0% from 18 to 24, 31.6% from 25 to 44, 26.9% from 45 to 64, and 12.8% who were 65 years of age or older. The median age was 39 years. For every 100 females, there were 104.3 males. For every 100 females age 18 and over, there were 105.1 males.

The median income for a household in the town was $33,929, and the median income for a family was $35,662. Males had a median income of $30,000 versus $21,000 for females. The per capita income for the town was $14,772. About 9.5% of families and 14.3% of the population were below the poverty line, including 16.1% of those under age 18 and 14.0% of those age 65 or over.
