= Newport (CDP), Maine =

Newport, Maine
- Census-designated place
- Location within Maine Location within the United States
- Coordinates: 44°50′14″N 69°15′10″W
- Country: United States
- State: Maine
- County: Penobscot

Area
  - Total: 4.87 sq mi (12.61 km^{2})
  - Land: 3.52 sq mi (9.11 km^{2})
  - Water: 1.35 sq mi (3.50 km^{2})
- Elevation: 217 ft (66 m)

Population (2020)
  - Total: 1,690
  - Density: 480.6/sq mi (185.57/km^{2})
- Time zone: UTC-5 (Eastern (EST))
  - Summer (DST): UTC-4 (EDT)
- ZIP code: 04953
- Area code: 207
- FIPS code: 23-49100
- GNIS feature ID: 2377940

Newport is a census-designated place (CDP) consisting of the main area of settlement within the town of Newport in Penobscot County, Maine, United States. The population of the CDP was 1,776 at the 2010 census.

== Geography ==
According to the United States Census Bureau, the CDP has a total area of 4.9 square miles (12.6 km^{2}), of which 3.5 square miles (9.1 km^{2}) is land and 1.4 square miles (3.5 km^{2}), or 27.98%, is water.

== Demographics ==
Historical population
Census	Pop.	Note	%±
2020	1,690		—
U.S. Decennial Census

As of the census of 2000, there were 1,754 people, 781 households, and 474 families residing in the CDP. The population density was 501.8 inhabitants per square mile (193.7/km^{2}). There were 898 housing units at an average density of 256.9 per square mile (99.2/km^{2}). The racial makeup of the CDP was 98.29% White, 0.23% Black or African American, 0.46% Native American, 0.29% Asian, 0.06% Pacific Islander, 0.06% from other races, and 0.63% from two or more races. Hispanic or Latino of any race were 0.68% of the population.

There were 781 households, out of which 28.8% had children under the age of 18 living with them, 44.0% were married couples living together, 11.5% had a female householder with no husband present, and 39.3% were non-families. 33.0% of all households were made up of individuals, and 12.9% had someone living alone who was 65 years of age or older. The average household size was 2.25 and the average family size was 2.82.

In the CDP, the population was spread out, with 23.7% under the age of 18, 8.4% from 18 to 24, 28.4% from 25 to 44, 23.7% from 45 to 64, and 15.7% who were 65 years of age or older. The median age was 38 years. For every 100 females, there were 94.2 males. For every 100 females age 18 and over, there were 90.3 males.

The median income for a household in the CDP was $26,793, and the median income for a family was $36,146. Males had a median income of $27,708 versus $17,258 for females. The per capita income for the CDP was $15,102. About 7.9% of families and 15.3% of the population were below the poverty line, including 8.9% of those under age 18 and 19.0% of those age 65 or over.
