= Plymouth, Maine =

Town in Maine, United States

- Town
- Location within Maine Location within the United States
- Coordinates: 44°45′15″N 69°13′43″W
- Country: United States
- State: Maine
- County: Penobscot

Area
  - Total: 31.05 sq mi (80.42 km^{2})
  - Land: 29.73 sq mi (77.00 km^{2})
  - Water: 1.32 sq mi (3.42 km^{2})
- Elevation: 217 ft (66 m)

Population (2020)
  - Total: 1,325
  - Density: 45/sq mi (17.2/km^{2})
- Time zone: UTC-5 (Eastern (EST))
  - Summer (DST): UTC-4 (EDT)
- ZIP code: 04969
- Area code: 207
- FIPS code: 23-59950
- GNIS feature ID: 582679
- Website: townofplymouthmaine.com

Plymouth is a town in Penobscot County, Maine, United States. The population was 1,325 at the 2020 census.

== Geography ==
According to the United States Census Bureau, the town has a total area of 31.05 square miles (80.42 km^{2}), of which 29.73 square miles (77.00 km^{2}) is land and 1.32 square miles (3.42 km^{2}) is water.

== Demographics ==
Historical population
Census	Pop.	Note	%±
1830	504		—
1840	843		67.3%
1850	925		9.7%
1860	989		6.9%
1870	941		−4.9%
1880	828		−12.0%
1890	689		−16.8%
1900	658		−4.5%
1910	590		−10.3%
1920	576		−2.4%
1930	468		−18.7%
1940	462		−1.3%
1950	496		7.4%
1960	494		−0.4%
1970	542		9.7%
1980	811		49.6%
1990	1,152		42.0%
2000	1,257		9.1%
2010	1,380		9.8%
2020	1,325		−4.0%
U.S. Decennial Census

=== 2010 census ===
As of the census of 2010, there were 1,380 people, 537 households, and 366 families living in the town. The population density was 46.4 inhabitants per square mile (17.9/km^{2}). There were 615 housing units at an average density of 20.7 per square mile (8.0/km^{2}). The racial makeup of the town was 96.4% White, 0.2% African American, 1.0% Native American, 0.2% Asian, and 2.2% from two or more races. Hispanic or Latino of any race were 0.6% of the population.

There were 537 households, of which 33.1% had children under the age of 18 living with them, 52.1% were married couples living together, 9.9% had a female householder with no husband present, 6.1% had a male householder with no wife present, and 31.8% were non-families. 22.0% of all households were made up of individuals, and 6.9% had someone living alone who was 65 years of age or older. The average household size was 2.55 and the average family size was 2.97.

The median age in the town was 41 years. 24.7% of residents were under the age of 18; 6.3% were between the ages of 18 and 24; 25.3% were from 25 to 44; 32.1% were from 45 to 64; and 11.4% were 65 years of age or older. The gender makeup of the town was 50.1% male and 49.9% female.

=== 2000 census ===
As of the census of 2000, there were 1,257 people, 469 households, and 346 families living in the town. The population density was 42.0 inhabitants per square mile (16.2/km^{2}). There were 562 housing units at an average density of 18.8 per square mile (7.2/km^{2}). The racial makeup of the town was 97.85% White, 0.48% Native American, 0.08% Asian, 0.08% from other races, and 1.51% from two or more races. Hispanic or Latino of any race were 0.56% of the population.

There were 469 households, out of which 36.7% had children under the age of 18 living with them, 59.7% were married couples living together, 8.5% had a female householder with no husband present, and 26.2% were non-families. 21.1% of all households were made up of individuals, and 6.6% had someone living alone who was 65 years of age or older. The average household size was 2.66 and the average family size was 3.03.

In the town, the population was spread out, with 28.0% under the age of 18, 7.4% from 18 to 24, 32.1% from 25 to 44, 24.5% from 45 to 64, and 8.0% who were 65 years of age or older. The median age was 36 years. For every 100 females, there were 97.6 males. For every 100 females age 18 and over, there were 95.9 males.

The median income for a household in the town was $32,768, and the median income for a family was $35,417. Males had a median income of $30,625 versus $20,655 for females. The per capita income for the town was $15,533. About 14.7% of families and 16.2% of the population were below the poverty line, including 21.0% of those under age 18 and 8.7% of those age 65 or over.
