= Etna, Maine =

Town in Maine, United States

- Town
- Seal

- Location within Maine Location within the United States
- Coordinates: 44°45′50″N 69°07′39″W
- Country: United States
- State: Maine
- County: Penobscot

Area
  - Total: 24.97 sq mi (64.67 km^{2})
  - Land: 24.81 sq mi (64.26 km^{2})
  - Water: 0.16 sq mi (0.41 km^{2})
- Elevation: 456 ft (139 m)

Population (2020)
  - Total: 1,226
  - Density: 49/sq mi (19.1/km^{2})
- Time zone: UTC-5 (Eastern (EST))
  - Summer (DST): UTC-4 (EDT)
- ZIP code: 04434
- Area code: 207
- FIPS code: 23-23865
- GNIS feature ID: 582468
- Website: www.townofetna.com

Etna is a town in Penobscot County, Maine, United States. The population was 1,226 at the 2020 census.

== History ==
Etna is named for the famed Mount Etna in Italy. It was originally known as "Crosbytown" after its first proprietor, Gen. John Crosby of Hampden. Etna was incorporated as a town in 1820. c. 1850 it had a population of 802.

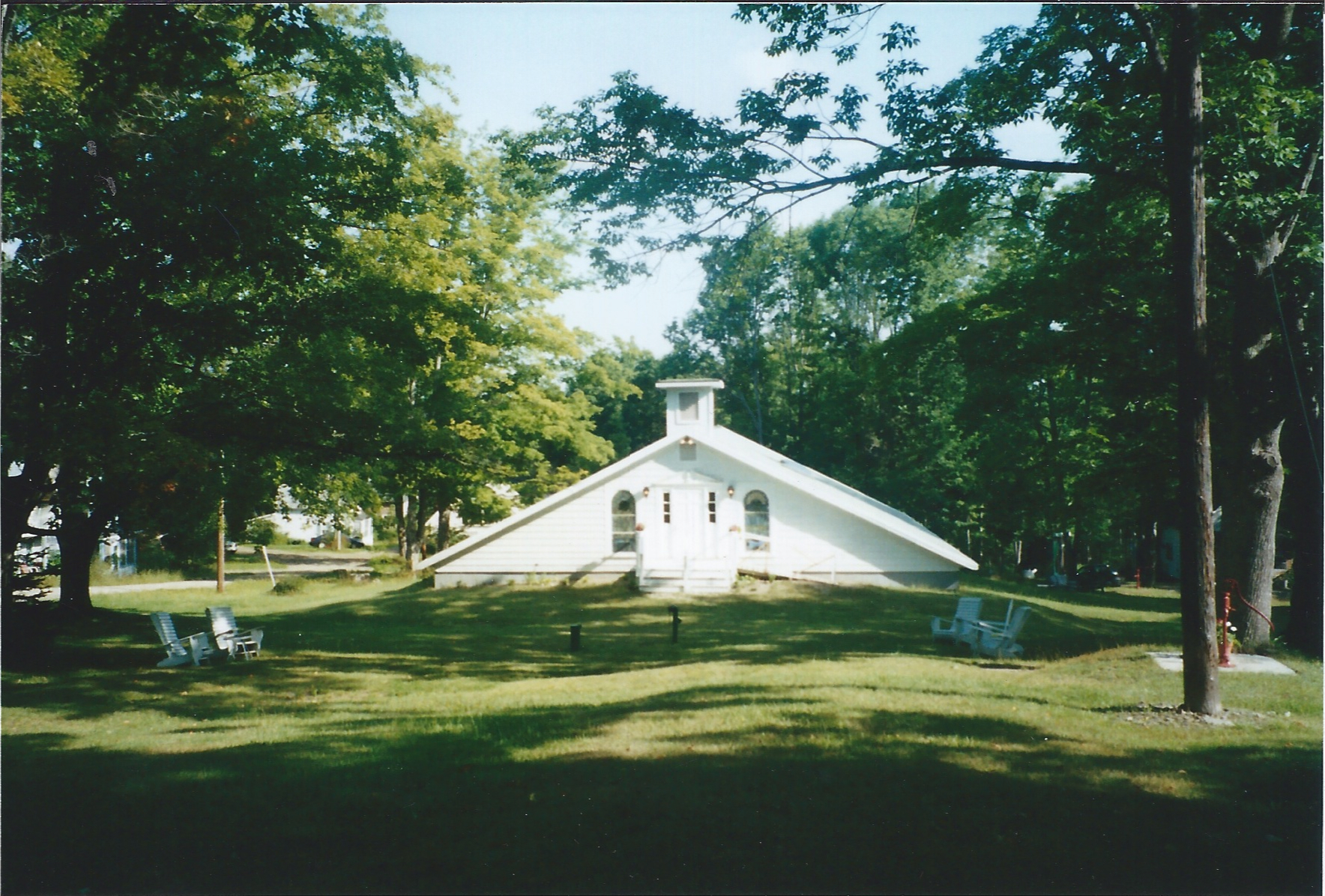

Camp Etna is a summer colony where spiritualists have held yearly meetings since 1876, when Daniel Buswell, Jr., held the first meeting in a tent. A temple seating 1,100, a club house, and 78 cottages were built in 1880. The grave of Mrs. Mary Scannell Pepper Vanderbilt, a leader and benefactor of the camp, is marked by a monument.

== Geography ==
According to the United States Census Bureau, the town has a total area of 24.97 square miles (64.67 km^{2}), of which 24.81 square miles (64.26 km^{2}) is land and 0.16 square miles (0.41 km^{2}) is water.

== Demographics ==
Historical population
Census	Pop.	Note	%±
1820	194		—
1830	362		86.6%
1840	745		105.8%
1850	802		7.7%
1860	849		5.9%
1870	844		−0.6%
1880	895		6.0%
1890	646		−27.8%
1900	527		−18.4%
1910	523		−0.8%
1920	386		−26.2%
1930	418		8.3%
1940	460		10.0%
1950	458		−0.4%
1960	486		6.1%
1970	526		8.2%
1980	758		44.1%
1990	977		28.9%
2000	1,012		3.6%
2010	1,246		23.1%
2020	1,226		−1.6%
U.S. Decennial Census

=== 2010 census ===
As of the census of 2010, there were 1,246 people, 481 households, and 338 families living in the town. The population density was 50.2 inhabitants per square mile (19.4/km^{2}). There were 559 housing units at an average density of 22.5 per square mile (8.7/km^{2}). The racial makeup of the town was 97.2% White, 0.7% African American, 0.6% Native American, 0.4% Asian, 0.3% from other races, and 0.7% from two or more races. Hispanic or Latino of any race were 1.1% of the population.

There were 481 households, of which 35.1% had children under the age of 18 living with them, 56.5% were married couples living together, 8.7% had a female householder with no husband present, 5.0% had a male householder with no wife present, and 29.7% were non-families. 20.2% of all households were made up of individuals, and 6.8% had someone living alone who was 65 years of age or older. The average household size was 2.59 and the average family size was 2.94.

The median age in the town was 39.1 years. 23.9% of residents were under the age of 18; 6.7% were between the ages of 18 and 24; 27.5% were from 25 to 44; 31.4% were from 45 to 64; and 10.6% were 65 years of age or older. The gender makeup of the town was 50.7% male and 49.3% female.

=== 2000 census ===
As of the census of 2000, there were 1,012 people, 392 households, and 295 families living in the town. The population density was 41.4 inhabitants per square mile (16.0/km^{2}). There were 427 housing units at an average density of 17.5 per square mile (6.8/km^{2}). The racial makeup of the town was 99.11% White, 0.20% African American, 0.20% Native American, 0.30% Asian, and 0.20% from two or more races. Hispanic or Latino of any race were 0.10% of the population.

There were 392 households, out of which 32.1% had children under the age of 18 living with them, 61.2% were married couples living together, 8.2% had a female householder with no husband present, and 24.7% were non-families. 17.6% of all households were made up of individuals, and 6.6% had someone living alone who was 65 years of age or older. The average household size was 2.58 and the average family size was 2.89.

In the town, the population was spread out, with 24.3% under the age of 18, 7.9% from 18 to 24, 31.6% from 25 to 44, 26.2% from 45 to 64, and 10.0% who were 65 years of age or older. The median age was 37 years. For every 100 females, there were 92.8 males. For every 100 females age 18 and over, there were 94.4 males.

The median income for a household in the town was $33,681, and the median income for a family was $37,750. Males had a median income of $30,057 versus $21,250 for females. The per capita income for the town was $14,633. About 13.5% of families and 18.1% of the population were below the poverty line, including 26.7% of those under age 18 and 14.9% of those age 65 or over.

== Notable person ==
- Mike Daisey, storyteller
