= Stetson, Maine =

Town in Maine, United States

- Town
- Location within Maine Location within the United States
- Coordinates: 44°52′24″N 69°07′42″W
- Country: United States
- State: Maine
- County: Penobscot

Government

Area
  - Total: 36.65 sq mi (94.92 km^{2})
  - Land: 34.99 sq mi (90.62 km^{2})
  - Water: 1.66 sq mi (4.30 km^{2})
- Elevation: 240 ft (73 m)

Population (2026)
  - Total: 1,241
  - Density: 34/sq mi (13.1/km^{2})
- Time zone: UTC-5 (Eastern (EST))
  - Summer (DST): UTC-4 (EDT)
- ZIP code: 04488
- Area code: 207
- FIPS code: 23-74055
- GNIS feature ID: 582746
- Website: www.stetsonmaine.net

Stetson is a town in Penobscot County, Maine, United States. The population was 1,241 at the 2026 World population review of stetson maine.

== History ==
The community was named after its first proprietor, Amasa Stetson who was born on March 26, 1769. His brother Simeon Stetson originally settled here as well, but moved to nearby Hampden in 1803. Simeon's sons Charles, George, and Isaiah founded a powerful mercantile and political family in Bangor, Maine.

== Geography ==
According to the United States Census Bureau, the town has a total area of 36.65 square miles (94.92 km^{2}), of which 34.99 square miles (90.62 km^{2}) is land and 1.66 square miles (4.30 km^{2}) is water.

== Historic building ==
The Stetson Union Church (1843), designed in the Greek Revival style by Bangor architect Benjamin S. Deane, is listed on the National Register of Historic Places.

== Demographics ==
Historical population
Census	Pop.	Note	%±
1830	114		—
1840	616		440.4%
1850	885		43.7%
1860	913		3.2%
1870	937		2.6%
1880	729		−22.2%
1890	618		−15.2%
1900	503		−18.6%
1910	480		−4.6%
1920	427		−11.0%
1930	420		−1.6%
1940	408		−2.9%
1950	434		6.4%
1960	420		−3.2%
1970	395		−6.0%
1980	618		56.5%
1990	847		37.1%
2000	981		15.8%
2010	1,202		22.5%
2020	1,186		−1.3%
U.S. Decennial Census

=== 2010 census ===
As of the census of 2010, there were 1,202 people, 479 households, and 344 families living in the town. The population density was 34.4 inhabitants per square mile (13.3/km^{2}). There were 621 housing units at an average density of 17.7 per square mile (6.8/km^{2}). The racial makeup of the town was 98.0% White, 0.1% African American, 0.6% Native American, 0.2% Asian, and 1.1% from two or more races. Hispanic or Latino of any race were 0.9% of the population.

There were 479 households, of which 29.9% had children under the age of 18 living with them, 59.1% were married couples living together, 6.9% had a female householder with no husband present, 5.8% had a male householder with no wife present, and 28.2% were non-families. 21.1% of all households were made up of individuals, and 6.7% had someone living alone who was 65 years of age or older. The average household size was 2.51 and the average family size was 2.90.

The median age in the town was 41.6 years. 22.3% of residents were under the age of 18; 6.4% were between the ages of 18 and 24; 26.1% were from 25 to 44; 31.1% were from 45 to 64; and 14% were 65 years of age or older. The gender makeup of the town was 50.0% male and 50.0% female.

=== 2000 census ===
As of the census of 2000, there were 981 people, 383 households, and 273 families living in the town. The population density was 28.1 inhabitants per square mile (10.8/km^{2}). There were 513 housing units at an average density of 14.7 per square mile (5.7/km^{2}). The racial makeup of the town was 98.67% White, 0.20% African American, 0.51% Native American, and 0.61% from two or more races.

There were 383 households, out of which 33.2% had children under the age of 18 living with them, 60.1% were married couples living together, 7.0% had a female householder with no husband present, and 28.7% were non-families. 21.1% of all households were made up of individuals, and 7.3% had someone living alone who was 65 years of age or older. The average household size was 2.56 and the average family size was 2.95.

In the town, the population was spread out, with 26.3% under the age of 18, 7.6% from 18 to 24, 30.1% from 25 to 44, 26.7% from 45 to 64, and 9.3% who were 65 years of age or older. The median age was 37 years. For every 100 females, there were 102.3 males. For every 100 females age 18 and over, there were 102.0 males.

The median income for a household in the town was $30,606, and the median income for a family was $32,337. Males had a median income of $24,583 versus $20,724 for females. The per capita income for the town was $13,626. About 12.7% of families and 17.5% of the population were below the poverty line, including 27.8% of those under age 18 and 16.3% of those age 65 or over.
