= Abial Cushman Store =

- U.S. National Register of Historic Places
- Location within Maine Location within the United States
- Location: Main St. E of ME 168, Lee, Maine
- Coordinates: 45°21′36″N 68°17′10″W
- Area: less than one acre
- Built: 1840
- Architectural style: Greek Revival
- NRHP reference No.: 90001906
- Added to NRHP: December 18, 1990

The Abial Cushman Store (also known as the Lee Forest Grange and Home on the Grange) is a historic commercial building at 2766 Lee Road in Lee, Maine. Built in 1840, it is one of the rural community's few surviving 19th-century commercial buildings, and one of its few examples of Greek Revival architecture.

== Description and history ==
The Abial Cushman Store is located in the rural village center of Lee, just east of Maine State Route 168 on the north side of Lee Road (Maine State Route 6). It is a rectangular wood-frame structure, two stories in height, with a side gable roof, clapboard siding, and a full-width single-story porch across the front. The front corners of the building have pilasters, which rise support an entablature across the front below the eave. The front facade has windows in the second level, and a two-part ground level. The left side of the ground floor houses a storefront with a center entry flanked by large fixed-pane windows, while the right side has a sash window and doorway that provides access to the upper level. A series of telescoping ells project to the rear of the main block.

The structure was built in 1840, and is believed to be the town's oldest surviving commercial building. Located in the town center and near the economically important Lee Academy, it was used as a general store for many years. In 1884 it became the home of the local Grange chapter, a role it served for much of the 20th century. It has since undergone some restoration, and is used as a retail and community space.

It was listed on the National Register of Historic Places December 18, 1990.

== See also ==
- National Register of Historic Places listings in Penobscot County, Maine
