= Wardwell =

Wardwell may refer to:

== People ==
- Allen Wardwell (1873–1953), American attorney
  - Davis Polk & Wardwell
- Daniel Wardwell (1791–1878), American politician
- Samuel Wardwell (1643-1692), a man accused of witchcraft during the Salem witch trials
- Walter C. Wardwell (1859–1940), American politician

== Places ==
- Camp Wardwell, or Fort Wardwell, later Fort Morgan (Colorado), U.S.

== See also ==
- Wardwell-Trickey Double House, in Bangor, Maine, U.S.
