= National Register of Historic Places listings in Penobscot County, Maine =

Location of Penobscot County in Maine

This is a list of properties on the National Register of Historic Places in Penobscot County, Maine.

This is intended to be a complete list of the properties and districts on the National Register of Historic Places in Penobscot County, Maine, United States. Latitude and longitude coordinates are provided for many National Register properties and districts; these locations may be seen together in a map.

There are 112 properties and districts listed on the National Register in the county. Five properties were once listed, but have since been removed from the register.

This National Park Service list is complete through NPS recent listings posted July 17, 2026.

Contents: Counties and municipalities in Maine
Androscoggin - Aroostook - Cumberland (City of Portland) - Franklin - Hancock - Kennebec - Knox - Lincoln - Oxford - Penobscot - Piscataquis - Sagadahoc - Somerset - Waldo - Washington - York

== Current listings ==
	Name on the Register	Image	Date listed	Location	City or town	Description
1	Abbott Memorial Library		November 20, 1978 (#78000190)	State Route 7; 45°01′28″N 69°17′21″W	Dexter	
2	Adams-Pickering Block	Adams-Pickering Block	May 2, 1974 (#74000184)	Corner of Main and Middle Sts. 44°47′59″N 68°46′20″W	Bangor	
3	All Souls Congregational Church	All Souls Congregational Church	June 18, 1992 (#92000790)	10 Broadway; 44°48′09″N 68°46′04″W	Bangor	
4	Harold Allan Schoolhouse		July 16, 2008 (#08000667)	15 Rebel Hill Rd. 44°48′19″N 68°32′22″W	Clifton	
5	Alpha Tau Omega House		June 6, 2023 (#100009047)	81 College Ave. 44°53′34″N 68°40′21″W	Orono	
6	Archeological Site No. 122-6		October 31, 1995 (#95001199)	Address Restricted	Millinocket	
7	Archeological Site No. 122-8		October 31, 1995 (#95001232)	Address Restricted	Millinocket	
8	Archeological Site No. 122-14		October 31, 1995 (#95001201)	Address Restricted	Millinocket	
9	Archeological Site No. 122-16		October 31, 1995 (#95001200)	Address Restricted	Millinocket	
10	Archeological Site No. 122-22		October 31, 1995 (#95001233)	Address Restricted	Millinocket	
11	Archeological Site No. 134-8		October 31, 1995 (#95001216)	Address Restricted	Millinocket	
12	Archeological Site No. 134-9		October 31, 1995 (#95001217)	Address Restricted	Millinocket	
13	Bangor Children's Home	Bangor Children's Home	September 9, 1975 (#75000103)	218 Ohio St. 44°48′27″N 68°46′52″W	Bangor	
14	Bangor Fire Engine House No. 6	Bangor Fire Engine House No. 6	April 7, 1988 (#88000394)	284 Center St. 44°48′49″N 68°46′24″W	Bangor	
15	Bangor Hose House No. 5	Bangor Hose House No. 5	September 11, 1997 (#97001130)	247 State St. 44°48′21″N 68°45′36″W	Bangor	
16	Bangor House	Bangor House	February 23, 1972 (#72000076)	174 Main St. 44°47′54″N 68°46′21″W	Bangor	
17	Bangor Mental Health Institute	Bangor Mental Health Institute	July 16, 1987 (#87000420)	656 State St. 44°49′02″N 68°44′31″W	Bangor	
18	Bangor Standpipe	Bangor Standpipe	August 30, 1974 (#74000185)	Jackson St. 44°48′27″N 68°46′58″W	Bangor	
19	Bangor Theological Seminary Historic District	Bangor Theological Seminary Historic District	August 2, 1977 (#77000080)	Union St. 44°48′07″N 68°46′48″W	Bangor	
20	Bank Block		March 25, 1999 (#99000375)	15 Main St. 45°01′28″N 69°17′29″W	Dexter	
21	Battleship Maine Monument	Battleship Maine Monument	October 8, 1999 (#99001187)	Junction of Main and Cedar Sts. 44°47′51″N 68°46′26″W	Bangor	
22	Blake House	Blake House	October 31, 1972 (#72000077)	107 Court St. 44°48′13″N 68°46′37″W	Bangor	
23	Bodwell Water Power Company Plant		September 29, 1988 (#88001842)	Eastern side of the Penobscot River at Bridge St. 44°56′28″N 68°38′53″W	Milford	
24	Bradford Farm Historic District		April 22, 2003 (#03000294)	46 Main St. (SR 11); 45°59′56″N 68°26′51″W	Patten	Now a bed and breakfast
25	Brewer High School	Brewer High School	October 8, 2014 (#14000838)	5 Somerset St. 44°47′31″N 68°45′35″W	Brewer	
26	Broadway Historic District		May 7, 1973 (#73000244)	Bounded by Garland, Essex, State, Park, and Center Sts. 44°48′18″N 68°46′05″W	Bangor	
27	Charles G. Bryant Double House	Charles G. Bryant Double House	June 20, 1986 (#86001338)	16-18 Division St. 44°48′31″N 68°46′33″W	Bangor	
28	Building at 84–96 Hammond Street	Building at 84–96 Hammond Street	August 5, 2005 (#05000797)	84–96 Hammond St. 44°48′05″N 68°46′22″W	Bangor	
29	Louis I. Bussey School		November 7, 1976 (#76000108)	U.S. Route 202; 44°40′50″N 69°09′45″W	Dixmont	
30	Cliffwood Hall		July 16, 2008 (#08000666)	15 Rebel Hill Rd. 44°48′18″N 68°32′22″W	Clifton	
31	William Colburn House	William Colburn House	June 19, 1973 (#73000134)	91 Bennoch Rd. 44°53′19″N 68°40′42″W	Orono	
32	Colonial Apartments	Colonial Apartments	December 19, 2012 (#12001067)	51-53 High St. 44°48′00″N 68°46′27″W	Bangor	
33	Congregational Church of Medway		November 21, 1977 (#77000081)	Off State Route 11; 45°36′20″N 68°31′39″W	Medway	
34	Connors House	Connors House	October 6, 1983 (#83003669)	277 State St. 44°48′21″N 68°45′33″W	Bangor	
35	Corinth Town Hall and Corinthian Lodge No. 59, I.O.O.F.	Corinth Town Hall and Corinthian Lodge No. 59, I.O.O.F.	January 24, 2008 (#07001446)	328 Main St. 45°00′08″N 69°01′22″W	Corinth	
36	Corinth Village		June 4, 1973 (#73000135)	3.5 miles west of East Corinth; 44°57′20″N 69°01′23″W	East Corinth	
37	John B. Curtis Free Public Library		April 14, 1997 (#97000310)	Northeastern corner of the junction of State Routes 11 and 221; 45°04′03″N 68°56′13″W	Bradford	
38	Abial Cushman Store		December 18, 1990 (#90001906)	Main St. east of State Route 168; 45°21′36″N 68°17′10″W	Lee	
39	Dexter Grist Mill	Dexter Grist Mill	October 10, 1975 (#75000104)	State Route 7; 45°01′23″N 69°17′29″W	Dexter	
40	Dexter Universalist Church		June 20, 1985 (#85001258)	Church St. 45°01′29″N 69°17′22″W	Dexter	
41	District No. 2 School	District No. 2 School	April 15, 1997 (#97000309)	Southeastern corner of the junction of Pleasant St. and Caribou Rd. 45°11′07″N 68°36′51″W	Passadumkeag	
42	District No. 5 School House		September 11, 1997 (#97001131)	Billings Rd., 0.15 miles northeast of the junction of U.S. Route 2 and Billings Rd. 44°48′42″N 68°54′36″W	Hermon	
43	Dixmont Corner Church	Dixmont Corner Church	July 21, 1983 (#83000468)	U.S. Route 202; 44°40′50″N 69°09′42″W	Dixmont	
44	Dixmont Town House		June 27, 2014 (#14000361)	702 Western Ave. 44°41′06″N 69°08′03″W	Dixmont	
45	East Eddington Public Hall	East Eddington Public Hall	January 28, 2004 (#03001503)	Airline Rd., 0.4 miles west of its junction with State Route 46, S. 44°47′32″N 68°35′11″W	Eddington	
46	Eddington Bend (Site 74-8)		September 28, 1988 (#88000937)	Address Restricted	Eddington	
47	Enterprise Grange, No. 173		January 24, 2008 (#07001447)	446 Dow Rd. 44°43′14″N 68°47′20″W	Orrington	
48	Samuel Farrar House		May 23, 1974 (#74000186)	123 Court St. 44°48′15″N 68°46′39″W	Bangor	
49	Gordon Fox Ranch	Gordon Fox Ranch	November 9, 2015 (#15000769)	680 W. Broadway; 45°20′34″N 68°33′48″W	Lincoln	
50	Garland Grange Hall		May 12, 1975 (#75000105)	Off State Route 94; 45°02′27″N 69°09′38″W	Garland	
51	Godfrey-Kellogg House	Godfrey-Kellogg House	June 18, 1973 (#73000136)	212 Kenduskeag Ave. 44°48′54″N 68°47′01″W	Bangor	
52	Grand Army Memorial Home	Grand Army Memorial Home	October 31, 1972 (#72000105)	159 Union St. 44°47′59″N 68°46′30″W	Bangor	
53	Great Fire of 1911 Historic District	Great Fire of 1911 Historic District	June 14, 1984 (#84001479)	Harlow, Center, Park, State, York, and Central Sts.; also 29 Franklin St. 44°48′11″N 68°46′12″W	Bangor	29 Franklin St. represents a boundary increase approved January 4, 2023.
54	Great Northern Paper Company Administration Historic District		September 20, 2023 (#100009368)	1 Katahdin Ave. 45°39′59″N 68°42′49″W	Millinocket	
55	Gut Island Site		March 17, 1994 (#94000182)	Address Restricted	Old Town	
56	Hannibal Hamlin House	Hannibal Hamlin House	October 9, 1979 (#79000160)	15 5th St. 44°48′02″N 68°46′50″W	Bangor	
57	Hammond Street Congregation Church	Hammond Street Congregation Church	July 8, 1982 (#82000774)	Hammond and High Sts. 44°48′04″N 68°46′28″W	Bangor	
58	Hampden Academy	Hampden Academy	September 11, 1975 (#75000106)	1 Main Road North; 44°44′24″N 68°50′17″W	Hampden	1842 Greek Revival school building
59	Hampden Congregational Church	Hampden Congregational Church	June 25, 1987 (#87000921)	Main Rd., N. 44°44′47″N 68°50′12″W	Hampden	
60	Harmony Hall		June 27, 2007 (#07000596)	24 Kennebec Rd. 44°43′57″N 68°50′40″W	Hampden	
61	Hasey's Maine Stages Building		March 19, 2024 (#100010085)	490 Broadway; 44°49′06″N 68°46′29″W	Bangor	
62	Hexagon Barn		January 24, 1980 (#80000412)	Spring and Railroad Sts. 44°50′04″N 69°16′34″W	Newport	
63	Hirundo Site	Hirundo Site	September 11, 1975 (#75000107)	Hirundo Wildlife Refuge; 44°59′27″N 68°46′58″W	Old Town	
64	Holden Town Hall		June 27, 2014 (#14000362)	723 Main Rd. 44°44′59″N 68°39′02″W	Holden	
65	Charles W. Jenkins House	Charles W. Jenkins House	September 18, 1990 (#90001469)	67 Pine St. 44°48′10″N 68°45′59″W	Bangor	
66	Col. Gabriel Johonnot House		June 23, 2025 (#100011943)	588 Kennebec Road; 44°43′04″N 68°53′23″W	Hampden	
67	Jonas Cutting-Edward Kent House	Jonas Cutting-Edward Kent House	April 2, 1973 (#73000137)	48-50 Penobscot St. 44°48′16″N 68°46′04″W	Bangor	
68	Martin Kinsley House		April 14, 1983 (#83000469)	83 Main Rd. S 44°44′02″N 68°50′28″W	Hampden Highlands	Now home to the Hampden Historical Society.
69	Jabez Knowlton Store		January 18, 1978 (#78000191)	West of Newburgh on State Route 9; 44°42′37″N 69°02′26″W	Newburgh	A private museum, open by appointment.
70	Joseph W. Low House		December 4, 1973 (#73000138)	51 Highland St. 44°48′23″N 68°47′00″W	Bangor	
71	Maine Archeological Survey Site		January 26, 1984 (#84001486)	Address Restricted	Indian Island	Site #74-2
72	Maine Experiment Station Barn	Maine Experiment Station Barn	September 18, 1990 (#90001468)	University of Maine campus 44°53′51″N 68°40′00″W	Orono	Main building of the Page Farm & Home Museum
73	Mallett Hall		October 29, 1993 (#93001115)	Northern side of State Route 6, 0.1 miles east of its junction with State Route 168; 45°21′35″N 68°17′03″W	Lee	
74	Milford Congregational Church		July 13, 1989 (#89000841)	Main and Ferry Sts. 44°56′48″N 68°38′42″W	Milford	
75	Morse & Co. Office Building	Morse & Co. Office Building	April 2, 1973 (#73000139)	455 Harlow St. 44°48′27″N 68°46′39″W	Bangor	
76	Morse's Corner School		September 6, 2024 (#100010823)	22 White Road; 44°56′16″N 69°13′47″W	Corinna	
77	Mount Hope Cemetery District	Mount Hope Cemetery District	December 4, 1974 (#74000187)	U.S. Route 2; 44°49′29″N 68°43′28″W	Bangor	
78	North Newport Christian Church		June 20, 1995 (#95000726)	Northeastern corner of the junction of State Route 222 and Pratt Rd. 44°53′29″N 69°12′25″W	North Newport	
79	Old Fire Engine House	Old Fire Engine House	September 12, 1985 (#85002181)	N. Main St. 44°53′07″N 68°39′49″W	Orono	
80	Old Tavern		April 4, 1986 (#86000674)	State Route 188 and Old Dam Rd. 45°12′32″N 68°25′30″W	Burlington	
81	Orono Main Street Historic District		December 7, 1977 (#77000082)	Main St. from Maplewood Ave. to Pine St. 44°52′40″N 68°40′38″W	Orono	Contributing properties include Jeremiah Colburn House
82	Edith Marion Patch House	Edith Marion Patch House	November 29, 2001 (#01001269)	500 College Ave. 44°54′37″N 68°40′36″W	Old Town	
83	Penobscot Expedition Site	Penobscot Expedition Site	April 23, 1973 (#73000140)	In the Penobscot River	Bangor and Brewer	Submerged archaeological remains of the 1779 Penobscot Expedition
84	Penobscot Salmon Club and Pool		September 15, 1976 (#76000109)	N. Main St. 44°48′30″N 68°44′39″W	North Brewer	
85	Phi Gamma Delta House	Phi Gamma Delta House	April 16, 2013 (#13000169)	79 College Ave. 44°53′31″N 68°40′22″W	Orono	
86	Robyville Bridge	Robyville Bridge	February 16, 1970 (#70000061)	Over Kenduskeag Stream; 44°56′35″N 68°58′08″W	Robyville	
87	St. Anne's Church and Mission Site	St. Anne's Church and Mission Site	November 26, 1973 (#73000141)	Down Street, on Indian Island off State Route 43; 44°56′34″N 68°39′08″W	Old Town	1830 church for mission established in 1688
88	St. James Episcopal Church	St. James Episcopal Church	November 19, 1974 (#74000188)	Centre St. 44°56′02″N 68°38′47″W	Old Town	
89	St. John's Catholic Church	St. John's Catholic Church	April 2, 1973 (#73000142)	York St. 44°48′13″N 68°45′40″W	Bangor	
90	Daniel Sargent House	Daniel Sargent House	October 29, 1982 (#82000425)	613 S. Main St. 44°46′03″N 68°47′05″W	Brewer	
91	Sargent-Roberts House	Sargent-Roberts House	December 13, 1996 (#96001476)	178 State St. 44°48′17″N 68°45′51″W	Bangor	
92	Sebasticook Lake Fishweir Complex		November 10, 1994 (#94001245)	Normally submerged in Sebasticook Lake	Newport	
93	George W. Smith Homestead		January 15, 1980 (#80000249)	Main St. 45°30′59″N 68°21′13″W	Mattawamkeag	
94	Zebulon Smith House	Zebulon Smith House	January 21, 1974 (#74000189)	55 Summer St. 44°47′47″N 68°46′24″W	Bangor	
95	Springfield Congregational Church		December 22, 1978 (#78000193)	State Route 6; 45°23′45″N 68°08′16″W	Springfield	
96	Stetson Union Church	Stetson Union Church	July 15, 1981 (#81000068)	State Route 222; 44°53′35″N 69°08′17″W	Stetson	
97	Stewart Free Library	Stewart Free Library	July 30, 1974 (#74000190)	State Routes 11/43; 44°55′16″N 69°15′46″W	Corinna	
98	Symphony House	Symphony House	October 26, 1972 (#72000078)	166 Union St. 44°47′58″N 68°46′32″W	Bangor	aka the Isaac Farrar Mansion; now owned by the YMCA.
99	Nathaniel Treat House	Nathaniel Treat House	September 20, 1973 (#73000143)	114 Main St. 44°52′48″N 68°39′48″W	Orono	
100	United Baptist Church		October 4, 2018 (#100003011)	53 Main Rd. 45°04′54″N 69°02′21″W	Charleston	
101	University of Maine at Orono Historic District	University of Maine at Orono Historic District	July 12, 1978 (#78000194)	Munson, Sebec, and Schoodic Rds. 44°53′56″N 68°40′17″W	Orono	Boundary increase (listed April 27, 2010): Roughly bounded by the Mall, College Ave, lower Munson and Long Rds.
102	US Post Office-Old Town Main	US Post Office-Old Town Main	September 25, 1986 (#86002958)	141 Center St. 44°56′05″N 68°38′48″W	Old Town	
103	US Post Office-Orono Main	US Post Office-Orono Main	May 2, 1986 (#86000881)	Forest and Bennoch Sts. 44°53′02″N 68°40′23″W	Orono	
104	Jones P. Veazie House	Jones P. Veazie House	June 23, 1988 (#88000890)	88 Fountain St. 44°48′45″N 68°46′38″W	Bangor	
105	Wardwell-Trickey Double House	Wardwell-Trickey Double House	June 18, 1992 (#92000795)	97-99 Ohio St. 44°48′12″N 68°46′47″W	Bangor	
106	Gov. Israel Washburn House	Gov. Israel Washburn House	January 12, 1973 (#73000144)	120 Main St. 44°52′37″N 68°40′40″W	Orono	
107	West Market Square Historic District	West Market Square Historic District	December 27, 1979 (#79000161)	W. Market Sq. 44°48′05″N 68°46′17″W	Bangor	
108	Wheelwright Block	Wheelwright Block	July 18, 1974 (#74000191)	34 Hammond St. 44°48′05″N 68°46′16″W	Bangor	
109	Whitney Park Historic District	Whitney Park Historic District	October 13, 1988 (#88001844)	Roughly bounded by 8th, Union, Pond and Hayford Sts. 44°48′05″N 68°46′58″W	Bangor	
110	Gen. John Williams House	Gen. John Williams House	December 22, 1978 (#78000195)	62 High St. 44°47′58″N 68°46′28″W	Bangor	
111	Young Site		March 26, 1976 (#76000110)	Address Restricted	Alton	Prehistoric archaeological site; listed in Hudson
112	Zions Hill		October 16, 1989 (#89001705)	37 Zions Hill; 45°01′23″N 69°17′42″W	Dexter	

== Former listings ==
	Name on the Register	Image	Date listed	Date removed	Location	City or town	Description
1	Collins Bridge Site		October 27, 1984 (#84000082)	March 6, 1987	ME 178	Bradley vicinity	
2	Romanzo Kingman House		February 19, 1982 (#82000775)	November 25, 2020	Main St. 45°32′57″N 68°11′58″W	Kingman	Destroyed by fire c. 2005.
3	Morse Bridge		February 16, 1970 (#70000060)	September 29, 2015	Valley Ave. over Kenduskeag Stream; 44°48′28″N 68°46′43″W	Bangor	Destroyed by arsonist on March 26, 1983.
4	Pierce Building		January 14, 1983 (#83000470)	March 9, 1984	23-37 Franklin St. 44°48′07″N 68°46′21″W	Bangor	Delisted due to extensive alteration of the building.
5	Charles H. Pond House		July 12, 1978 (#78000192)	December 22, 1986	175 State Street	Bangor	Was disassembled for relocation to 46 Court Street in 1979. Still in storage as of 1996

== See also ==
- List of National Historic Landmarks in Maine
- National Register of Historic Places listings in Maine
