= Jabez Knowlton Store =

- U.S. National Register of Historic Places
- Location within Maine Location within the United States
- Nearest city: Newburgh, Maine
- Coordinates: 44°42′37″N 69°2′26″W
- Area: 1 acre (0.40 ha)
- Built: 1839
- Architectural style: Greek Revival
- NRHP reference No.: 78000191
- Added to NRHP: January 18, 1978

The Jabez Knowlton Store is a historic commercial building on Maine State Route 9 in Newburgh, Maine. Built in 1839, it is a well-preserved example of commercial Greek Revival architecture in a rural context. It is more significant for its well-preserved collection of goods dating to the early 20th century, preserved by the Knowlton family after the store's last proprietor died in 1910. The property, open by appointment as a museum, was listed on the National Register of Historic Places in 1978.

== Description and history ==
The Knowlton Store is located on the south side of Maine State Route 9, west of Newburgh's rural village center, and just east of the Knowlton family cemetery. It is now set back from the road, behind a row of trees, a site to which it was moved in 1957. It is a 1-1/2 story rectangular wood frame structure, with a front-facing gable roof, clapboard siding, and fieldstone foundation. The north-facing front has a centered entrance, with sash windows to either side, and a pair of sash windows in the gable. A single chimney rises from the rear of the building. The interior of the building retains original mid-19th century store fixtures, its shelves lined with goods from the early 19th century.

The store was built in 1839 by Jabez Knowlton, a man with a diversity of business endeavours, and the store was operated for more than 70 years by members of the Knowlton family. When its last owner died quite suddenly in 1910, his widow closed the store, leaving its stock essentially intact. The store property was kept up by the Knowltons through the 20th century, and was moved to its present location by Amos Kimball in 1957, setting it back from the road. It is now a museum property, open by appointment.

== See also ==
- National Register of Historic Places listings in Penobscot County, Maine
