= North Newport Christian Church =

Historic church in Maine, United States

- U.S. National Register of Historic Places
- Location within Maine Location within the United States
- Location: Jct. of ME 222 and Pratt Rd., NE corner, North Newport, Maine
- Coordinates: 44°53′29″N 69°12′25″W
- Area: less than one acre
- Built: 1857
- Architect: Steward, Abiah
- Architectural style: Italianate, Greek Revival
- NRHP reference No.: 95000726
- Added to NRHP: June 20, 1995

North Newport Christian Church is an historic church at the junction of Maine State Route 222 and Pratt Road in North Newport, Maine. Built in 1857, it is a fine example of a transitional Greek Revival-Italianate church in a rural context. It originally housed both Baptist and Congregationalist congregations, but later was used only by the latter, and is now infrequently used. It was listed on the National Register of Historic Places in 1995.

== Description and history ==
The North Newport Christian Church is set at the northwest corner of Pratt Road and Mullen Street (Maine SR 222) in northern Newport, about halfway between Corinna and Stetson. It is a single-story wood-frame structure, with a front-facing gable roof, clapboard siding, and a stone foundation. The gable ends have returns, and the gables and eaves have extended overhangs with decorative brackets. The building corners are pilastered. The main facade, facing south, is symmetrically arranged, with a pair of entrances, each framed by pilasters and a bracketed cornice on either side of a single window. The gable end is decorated with a large triangular false louver. The interior has small vestibule areas, leading into the main chamber, which has original pews with two aisles, and a raised platform at the far end.

The church was built in 1857 by Abiah Steward, and represents a well-preserved modestly-styled example of transitional architecture in a rural setting. North Newport's Baptist congregation was established in 1817, and its Christian Church congregation about 1840, both originally meeting in local schoolhouses. In about 1850 the two congregations began discussing building a shared facility, which resulted in the construction of this building (supposedly about midway between their previous meeting places). By 1907 the building was being exclusively by the Christian Church congregation, which met regularly until about 1975. The building is now used only occasionally for services.

== See also ==
- National Register of Historic Places listings in Penobscot County, Maine
