= Eddington Bend Site =

- Eddington Bend (Site 74-8)
- U.S. National Register of Historic Places
- Nearest city: Eddington, Maine
- Area: 10.8 acres (4.4 ha)
- NRHP reference No.: 88000937
- Added to NRHP: September 28, 1988

The Eddington Bend Site, designated Site 74-8 by the Maine Archaeological Survey, is a prehistoric archaeological site in Eddington, Maine. Located near the banks of the Penobscot River, the site includes both evidence of habitation, and of funerary remains. The stratified site has dated elements as old as 3,000 BCE, and undated finds that are probably older. The site was listed on the National Register of Historic Places in 1988.

== Description ==
The Eddington Bend Site is located on a terrace overlooking the Penobscot River, not far from the former location of the Veazie Dam, at a point in which the river bends sharply to the west. The river is described at this point as having a particularly fine and well-known salmon pool. The site includes a bluff on the river bank that is subject to erosion, and is composed primarily of sandy soils topped by a plow zone.

Most of the site's important features have been found in the top 1 metre (3.3 ft) of the site. These features include pits and trenches, whose uses are conjectural. The trenches contain a great deal of fire-cracked rock as well as evidence of post holes, and are theorized to have been used as drying racks or roasting sites for fish caught in the river. The function of the pit features is not known due to a lack of diagnostic features. The site also contains a cemetery, in which significant number of human remains were found, buried with red ochre.

The site has been of archaeological interest since the early 20th century, and was first formally investigated in 1926 by Walter Smith. More recently, it underwent investigation and excavation in 1984 and 1986. The site has been damaged by agricultural activity, industrial works related to the Veazie Dam, and the actions of illegal amateur pot-hunters.

== See also ==
- National Register of Historic Places listings in Penobscot County, Maine
