= Page Farm & Home Museum =

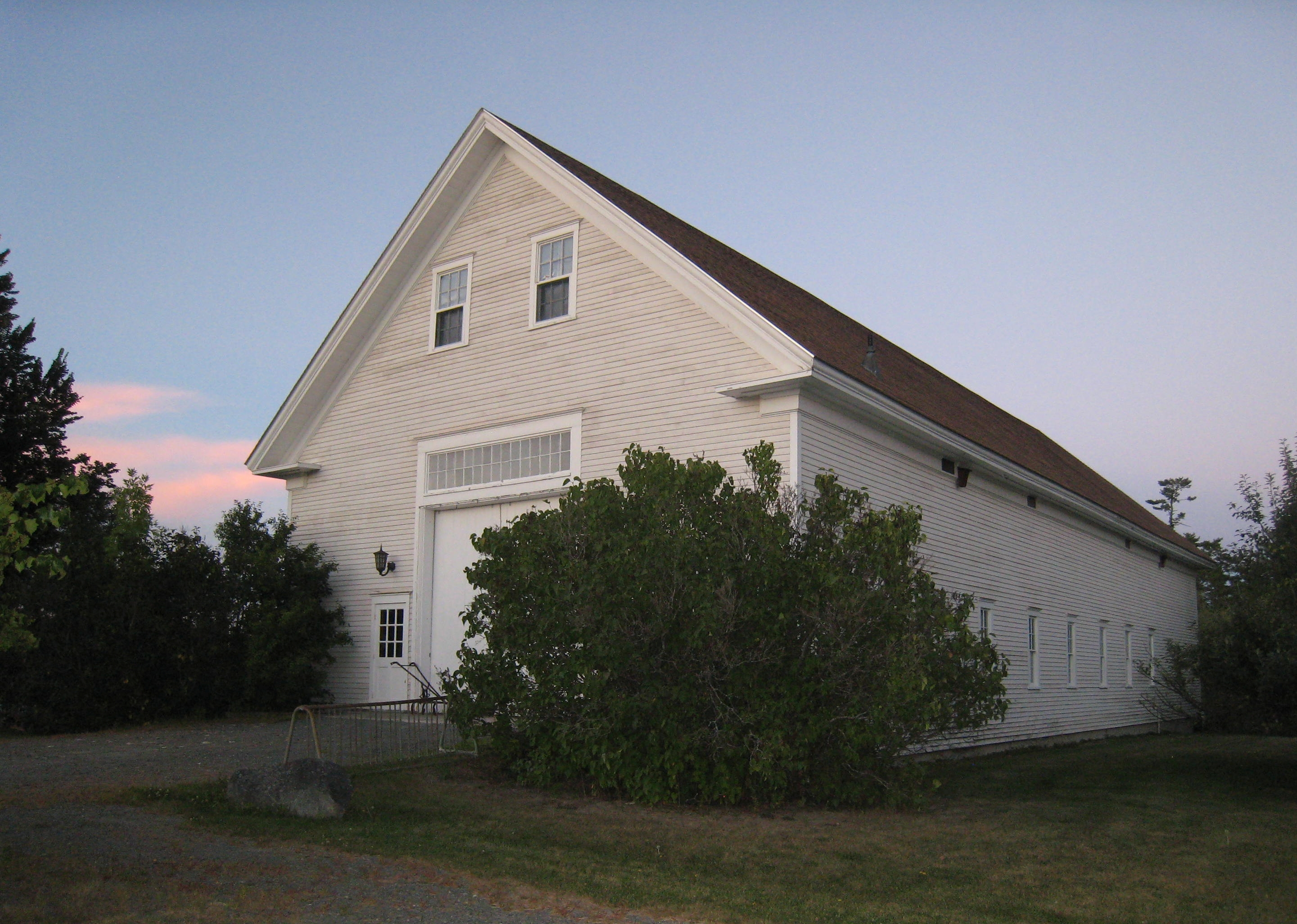
- Location: Orono, Maine, United States
- Coordinates: 44.8976°N 68.6660°W
- Type: Farm museum
- Website: www.umaine.edu/pagefarm
- Maine Experiment Station Barn
- U.S. National Register of Historic Places
- Area: less than one acre
- Built: 1885
- NRHP reference No.: 90001468
- Added to NRHP: September 18, 1990

The Page Farm & Home Museum is a museum on the campus of the University of Maine in Orono, Maine. Its mission is "to collect, document, preserve, interpret and disseminate knowledge of Maine history relating to farms and farming communities between 1865 and 1940, providing an educational and cultural experience for the public and a resource for researchers of this period." The University of Maine was founded in 1865 as the "Maine College of Agriculture and the Mechanic Arts". The centerpiece of the museum is the Maine Experiment Station Barn, a 19th-century barn, listed on the National Register of Historic Places, that is the last standing agricultural building on the campus.

== Setting ==
The museum is located on the eastern side of the Orono campus south of Sebago Street and east of Grove Street. It includes a cluster of four buildings across the parking lot east of Hitcher Hall. The main building is a three-story post-and-beam barn, set on a graded lot with ground level access to the lower to levels. South of the barn stand three smaller buildings: a one-room school house originally from Holden that was built in 1855, and the Winston E. Pullen Carriage House and Blacksmith Shop, built in 2003. The museum houses displays and artifacts on the rural history of Maine in the 19th and 20th centuries. Longtime Maine food educator and recipe columnist Mildred Brown Schrumpf contributed many artifacts to furnish the "Brownie's Kitchen" exhibit depicting an early 20th-century farmhouse kitchen.

== History ==
The University of Maine was established in 1865, with a focus on agricultural education and practices. In 1885 the state established the Maine Fertilizer Control and Agricultural Experiment Station, which was colocated with the university's agricultural facilities, and was made a department of the university in 1887. The university states that the barn's construction dates to 1833, while the National Register nomination, prepared by the state's Historic Preservation Commission in 1990, dates the barn to 1885. The barn was originally located at the site of Merrill Hall, and was moved in 1930 to a point several hundred feet south of that site. It was moved to the present location in the 1990s, in anticipation for its new role as a museum.

== See also ==
- National Register of Historic Places listings in Penobscot County, Maine
