= Comins Hall =

- East Eddington Public Hall
- U.S. National Register of Historic Places
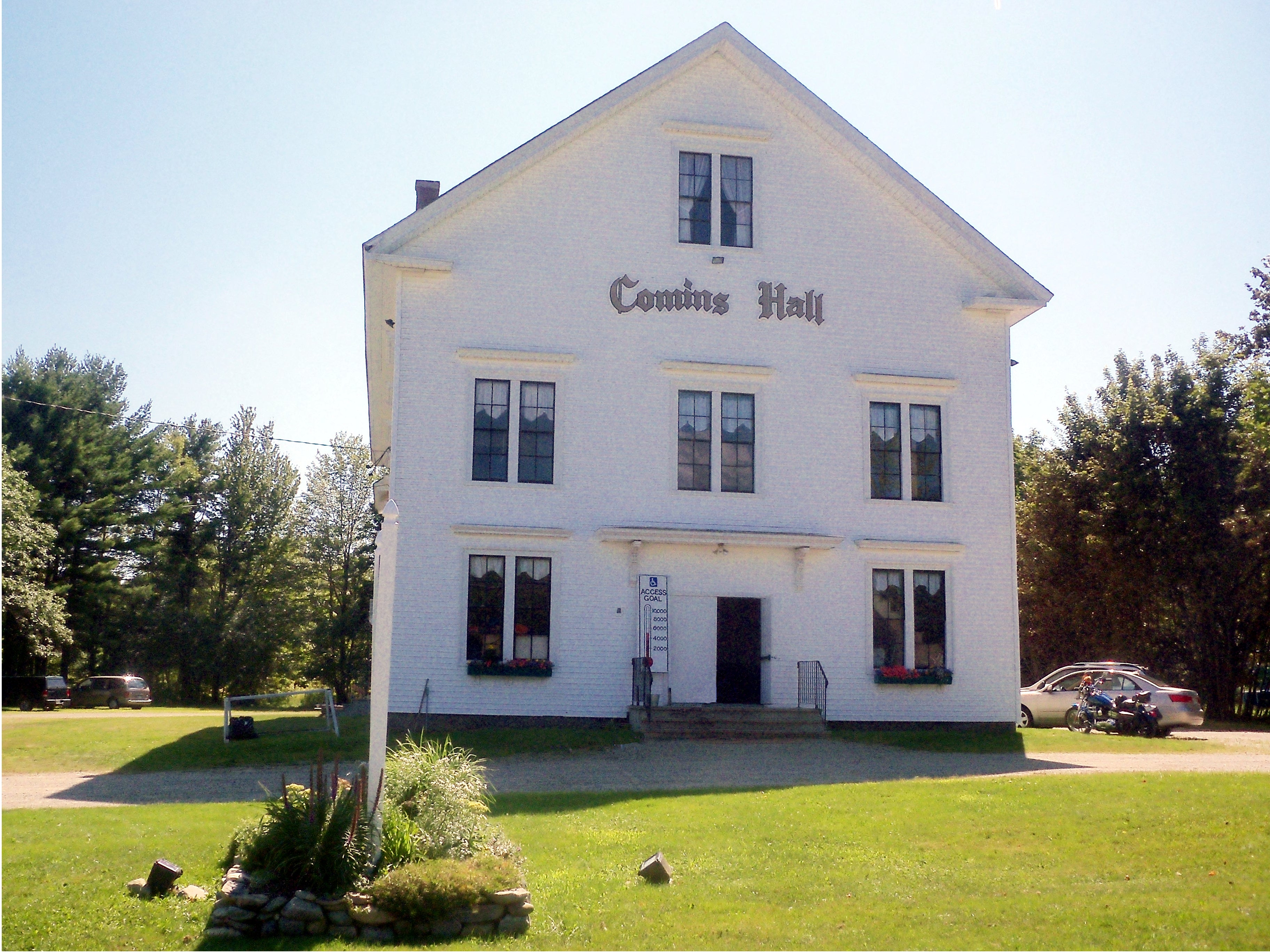

- Location within Maine Location within the United States
- Location: 1387 Main Road, Eddington, Maine
- Coordinates: 44.7924°N 68.5861°W
- Area: 1.4 acres (0.57 ha)
- Built: 1879
- Architect: John James Temple
- Architectural style: Italianate
- NRHP reference No.: 03001503
- Added to NRHP: January 28, 2004

Comins Hall, also known as the East Eddington Public Hall and the Eddington-Clifton Civic Center, is a historic social and civic meeting hall at 1387 Main Road in Eddington, Maine. Built in 1879, it has since then served as the town's only major social and civic meeting space, hosting town meetings, dances, dinners, Grange meetings, and traveling performers. It was listed on the National Register of Historic Places in 2004.

== Description and history ==
The East Eddington Public Hall is located in the village of East Eddington, on the south side of Main Road (Maine State Route 9), about 0.25 miles (0.40 km) west of its junction with Maine State Route 46. It is a 2 1/2-story wood-frame structure, with a front-facing gable roof, clapboard siding, and granite foundation. It has restrained Italianate styling, including paired windows under cornices on the front, and a shallow bracketed hood above the main entrance, which is centered on the north-facing main facade. At the south end of the building is a two-story addition, which adds a single bay to the building's length, and is topped by a hip roof. The interior has a foyer area with ticket booth and stairs winding upward, and a small meeting room to the right. The first floor otherwise houses a large dining room with kitchen area, and the second floor houses an auditorium with stage.

The hall was built in 1879 as a community project under the direction of John James Temple, a local carpenter. It was built for the East Eddington Farmers' Club, a local organization at which farmers could meet and discuss agricultural practices that had been established in 1876. The club formed a separate organization, the East Eddington Public Hall Company, to actually own the building and manage its operations. This company operated the building until 1983, when it was taken over by the Eddington-Clifton Civic Center, and renamed Comins Hall in honor of a local family whose members were involved in many local civic affairs.

The building was used, since its construction, as a polling place and site for town meetings, serving as the exclusive site of the latter between 1936 and the 1970s. It has hosted all manner of local community groups, including the local Grange chapter, generally at no charge, and has, since the construction of the stage addition in 1911, also hosted traveling theatrical shows and performers.

== See also ==
- National Register of Historic Places listings in Penobscot County, Maine
