= Gen. John Williams House =

Historic house in Maine, United States

- U.S. National Register of Historic Places
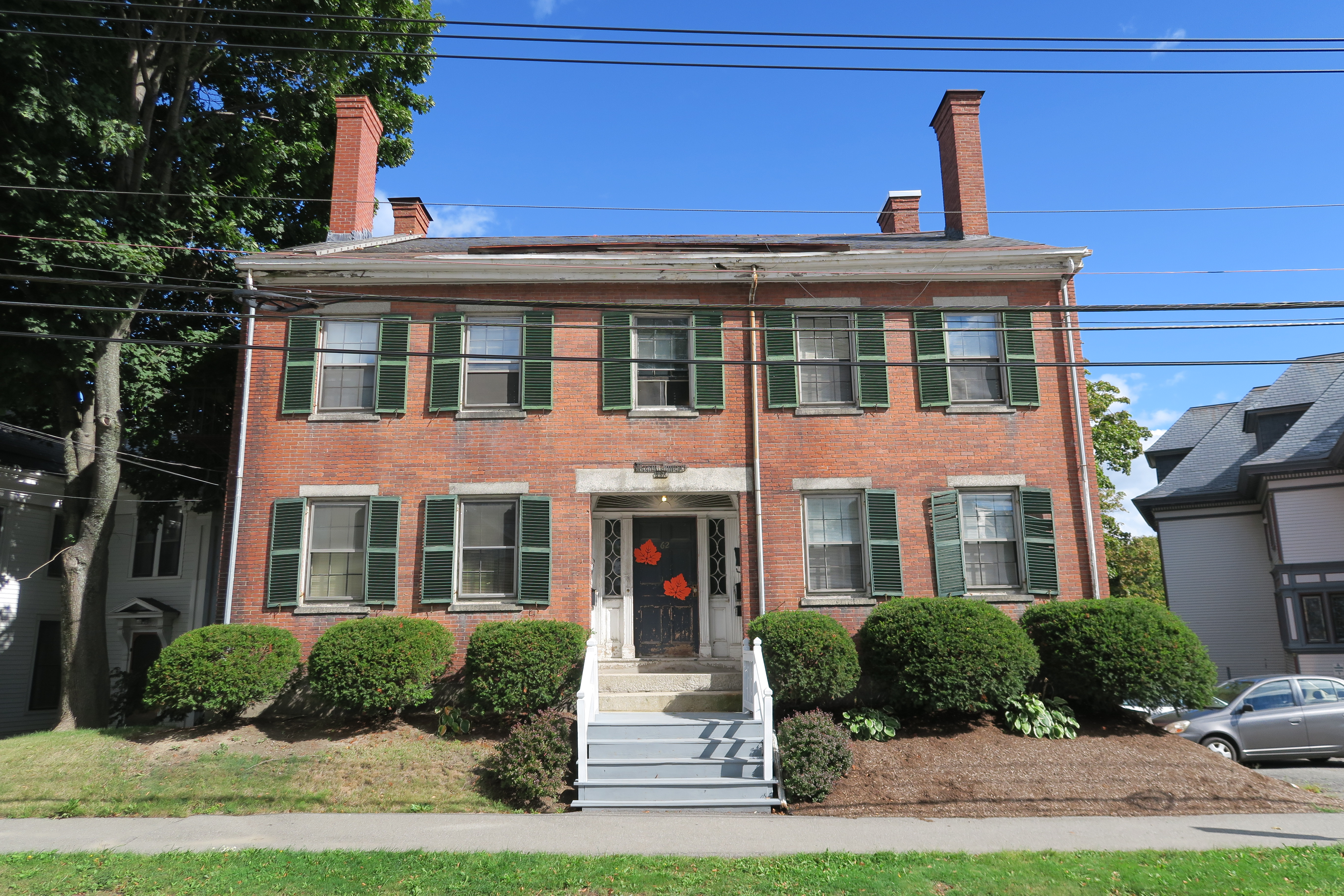
- Gen. John Williams House

- Location within Maine Location within the United States
- Location: 62 High St., Bangor, Maine
- Coordinates: 44°47′58″N 68°46′28″W
- Area: 0.3 acres (0.12 ha)
- Built: 1822
- Architectural style: Federal
- NRHP reference No.: 78000195
- Added to NRHP: December 22, 1978

The Gen. John Williams House is a historic house at 62 High Street in Bangor, Maine. Built in the early 1820s, it is believed to be the oldest brick house in the city, and one of its only examples of Federal architecture. It was built by John Williams, a leading businessman and militia commander of the period. It was listed on the National Register of Historic Places in 1978.

The Williams House is set on the north side of High Street, a short, predominantly residential, side street near Bangor's central business district. The house is a 2 1/2-story brick structure, five bays wide and three deep, with a side gable roof and four side chimneys. The centered entry is recessed in a wide opening with a granite lintel, with paneled sides, sidelight windows, and a fan above. Windows are plain sash windows with granite sills and lintels, and with shutters on the front facade.

John Williams was a successful local businessman who served in the local band of state militia during the War of 1812 and was commissioned a brigadier general in 1828. He acquired the lot in 1822, and in 1825 was taxed for the house's presence. In the civic scene, he served the fire brigade, was president of the local library association and registrar of probate for the county. He sold the house in 1835 to Dr. William Mason, in whose family it remained until the 1950s.

== See also ==
- National Register of Historic Places listings in Penobscot County, Maine
