= Gut Island =

- Interactive map of Gut Island

Geography
- Location: Penobscot River
- Coordinates: 44.94486°N 68.64932°W
- Area: 2 acres (0.81 ha)

Administration
- United States
- State: Maine
- County: Penobscot County
- Town: Old Town

- Gut Island Site
- U.S. National Register of Historic Places
- Nearest city: Old Town, Maine
- Area: 2 acres (0.81 ha)
- NRHP reference No.: 94000182
- Added to NRHP: March 17, 1994

Gut Island is a small 2-acre (0.81 ha) island in the Penobscot River, near Old Town and Milford in central Maine. The island, owned by the Penobscot Indian Nation, is archaeologically important, and has been designated Site 74.91 by the Maine Archaeological Survey. It was listed on the National Register of Historic Places in 1994 for its archaeological significance, which includes well-stratified evidence of human habitation dating back thousands of years.

== Description ==
Gut Island is located in the Penobscot River, about 6 metres (20 ft) from the Milford (east) bank of the river. It measures about 170 by 50 metres (560 ft × 160 ft), with a total surface area of 8,500 square metres (2.1 acres). It is flat, not rising more than 1 metre (3.3 ft) above the typical river level at any point. It has a rock outcrops at its northern end, and is sandy and graveled at the southern end. It is densely vegetated, with pine and maple trees, and thick underbrush. The island was probably formed by the accumulation of sediment and gravel downstream of the outcrops at its northern end.

The archaeological importance of the island was identified in 1988, during a survey performed prior to relicensing of a downstream hydroelectric power facility, and it underwent excavation that same year by a team from the University of Maine. Finds were found as deep as 100 centimetres (39 in), although the upper half of this depth is in many of the places surveyed to contain a mixture of prehistoric and historic artifacts, including ceramic pottery fragments, a stone tool, and evidence of a hearth. Deeper layers at the southern eod of the island yielded stone artifacts dating to the Middle and Late Archaic (c. 4000 BCE), including slate tools.

== See also ==
- National Register of Historic Places listings in Penobscot County, Maine
