= Congregational Church of Medway =

Historic church in Maine, United States

- U.S. National Register of Historic Places
- Location within Maine Location within the United States
- Location: Church St., Medway, Maine
- Coordinates: 45°36′20″N 68°31′39″W
- Area: 1 acre (0.40 ha)
- Built: 1874
- Architect: Cushman, Mansford
- NRHP reference No.: 77000081
- Added to NRHP: November 21, 1977

The former Congregational Church of Medway, also known as the Wonder Grange, is a historic church building on Church Street in Medway, Maine. Built in 1874, it is a well-preserved vernacular interpretation of Italianate style. The privately owned building has most recently been used as a Grange hall. It was listed on the National Register of Historic Places in 1977.

== Description and history ==
The former Congregational Church of Medway is located in a residential part of the town's main village, on the northeast side of Church Street a short way north of its junction with Main Street. It is set on a level lot adjacent to a cemetery. It is a 2-1/2 story wood frame structure, with a gabled roof, clapboard siding, and granite foundation. The roof has a deep eave studded with paired decorative brackets, and is topped by a three-stage square tower with a steep pyramidal roof. The main facade is three bays wide, with windows on the second level and a pair of entrances on the first level, flanking a central projecting bay with sash windows on the front and sides. The entrances and bay are sheltered by a flared hip-roof portico with large brackets flanking either side of each entrance. A round-arch window adorns the center of the front-facing gable.

The area that is now Medway was settled by 1820 and incorporated in 1875. Benjamin Fiske, owner of a local hotel and prominent in the town's civic affairs, privately funded the construction of this church, which was built by local builder Mansford Cushman. Fiske gave a deed to the community specifying the building's use as a church and school, with the property reverting to his family if these uses were discontinued. Both of these uses were eventually moved to other facilities in the town, and Fiske's descendants in the 20th century leased it to the local Grange chapter.

== See also ==
- National Register of Historic Places listings in Penobscot County, Maine
