= Building at 84–96 Hammond Street =

- U.S. National Register of Historic Places
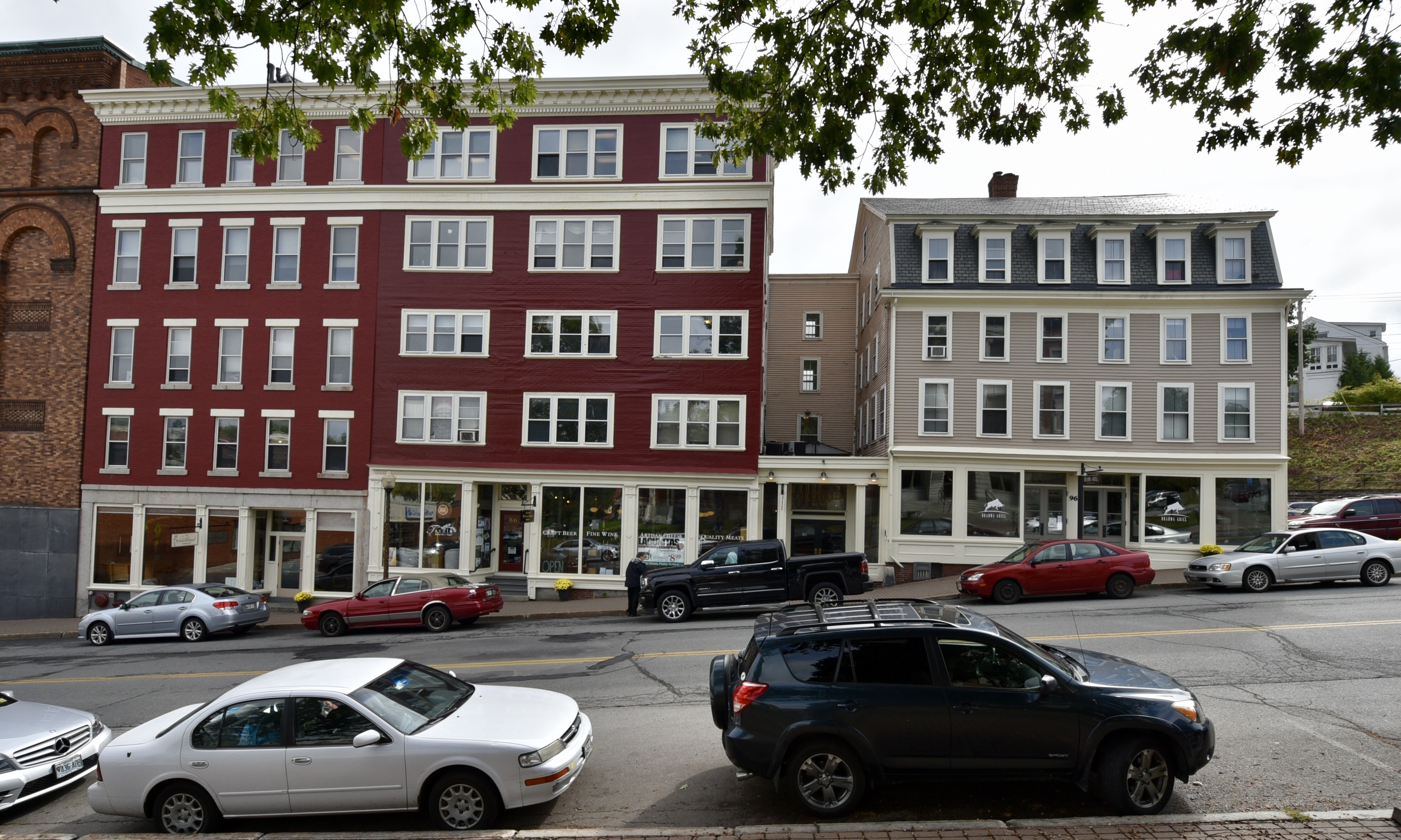

- Location within Maine Location within the United States
- Location: 84–96 Hammond St. Bangor, Maine
- Coordinates: 44.8014°N 68.7728°W
- Area: 0.5 acres (0.20 ha)
- Built: 1834
- Architectural style: Italianate, Second Empire
- NRHP reference No.: 05000797
- Added to NRHP: August 5, 2005

The Building at 84–96 Hammond Street in Bangor, Maine, is a historically significant commercial and residential structure. Actually an amalgamation of three buildings constructed between 1834 and c. 1875, it is a rare surviving element of Bangor's once-significant furniture manufacturing industry, having seen use in that endeavor from the 1830s until the 1980s. The building was listed on the National Register of Historic Places in 2005.

== Description and history ==
Hammond Street, designated United States Route 2 and Maine State Route 100, is a major roadway leading west from downtown Bangor. The rambling structure at 84–96 Hammond is located two blocks west of West Market Square, on the south side of the street between Columbia and North High Streets. As viewed facing south from the street, the building has two sections, each five stories in height, a courtyard area now enclosed by a single-story structure with a recessed doorway, and a 3 1/2-story mansard-roofed clapboarded section.

The leftmost element, #84, is a brick structure built in 1834 by Albert and Edmond Dole that was originally three stories in height. It shares unified cornices at the fourth and fifth level with the adjacent wood frame block (#88), also built (in 1843) by the Doles. These building were used by the Doles, who were cabinetmakers, as a furniture factory until 1889. Chandler & Co., the next occupant, adapted the space for use as a retail furniture showroom, using some of the space for upholstery work and as a repair shop. During their ownership, #84 and #88 were both raised to five stories, and #96 was integrated into its facility, with the intervening courtyard space service as a shipping and loading area. It was home to the Bangor Furniture Company 1927–1989. It has since been converted into mixed retail/commercial/residential use.

== See also ==
- National Register of Historic Places listings in Penobscot County, Maine
