= Gordon Fox Ranch =

- U.S. National Register of Historic Places
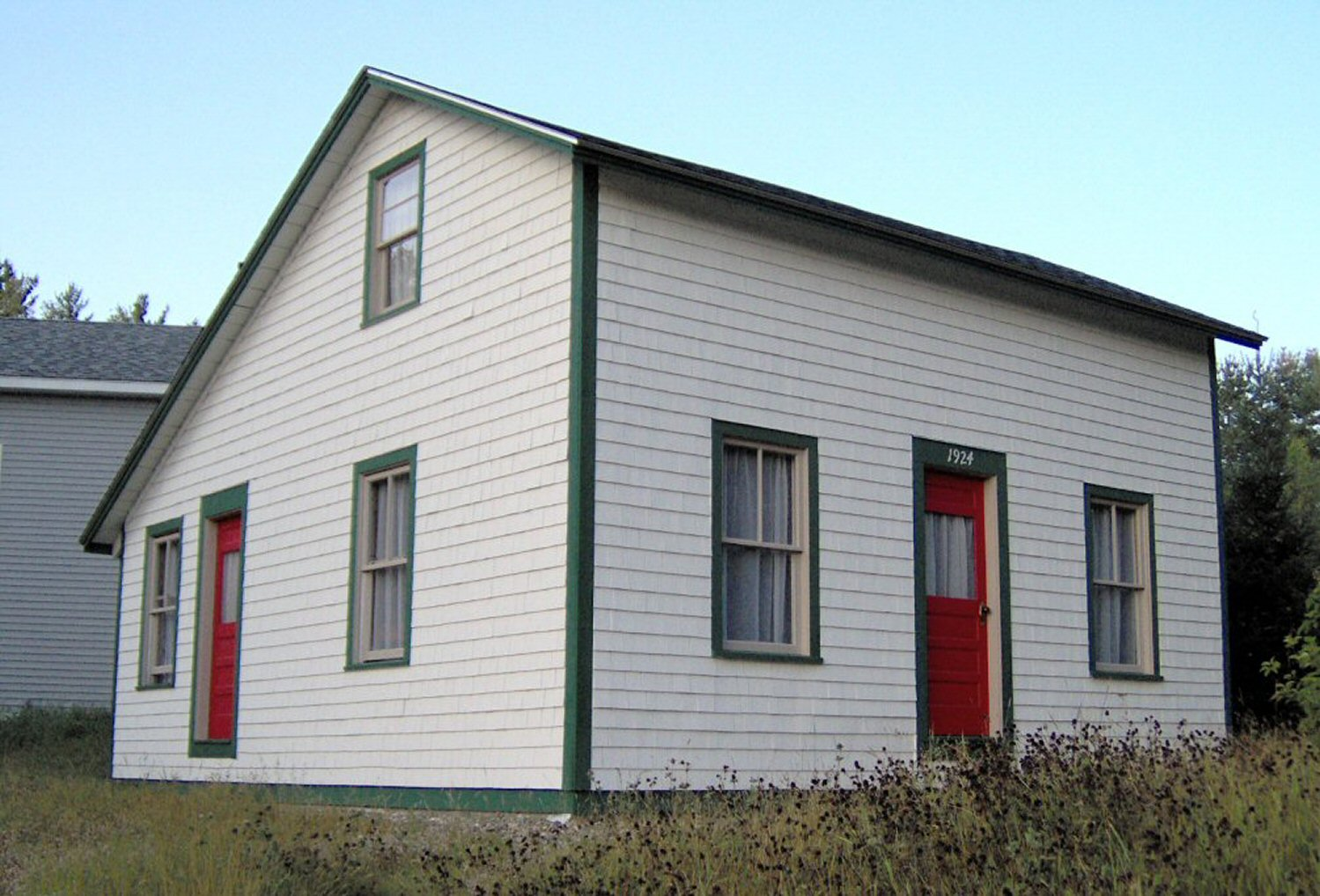
- The historic ranch house

- Location within Maine Location within the United States
- Location: 860 W. Broadway (US 2), Lincoln, Maine
- Coordinates: 45°20′34″N 68°33′48″W
- Area: 9.3 acres (3.8 ha)
- Built: 1924
- NRHP reference No.: 15000769
- Added to NRHP: November 9, 2015

The Gordon Fox Ranch is a historic silver fox farming property at 860 West Broadway (United States Route 2) in Lincoln, Maine. Operating from about 1924 to 1940, the property is the best-preserved of a significant number of fox farms established by brothers Frank and Fred Gordon in Lincoln. The property was listed on the National Register of Historic Places in 2015.

== Description and history ==
The Gordon Fox Ranch is located in a rural area of western Lincoln, on the south side of West Broadway. The property is more than 9 acres (3.6 ha) in size, of which less than 2 acres (0.81 ha) were ever cleared, the rest being forested. A cluster of buildings, some historic and some not, are set a short way south of the road. Nonhistoric buildings include a 1950s garage and a house built in 2006. Behind the garage stands a three-story square wood-frame tower, which has inward-sloping sides through two levels, with a vertically walled third level with windows in each face. Across the driveway from the garage stands a historic ranch house (set in front of the modern house); it is a 1 1/2-story wood-frame building, with a saltbox profile distinctive to the Gordon's fox ranching operations. This house was built in 1924. The property also includes a nearly-complete berm, surrounding a space that would originally have been fenced off as the space where the foxes were raised. Behind the houses stands a small wood-frame structure that originally served as the ranch office. When built, it was originally attached to the observation tower, but was separated in order to effect repairs on both structures. It is believed to be the only known surviving office building from one of these ranching operations.

Silver fox pelts were long a highly valued fur, significantly exceeding in value that of beaver. Ranching of the animals was made possible by the successful breeding of them in captivity on Prince Edward Island in the 1890s, and ranching operations gradually spread afterward. In the 1920s brothers Fred and Frank Gordon (of Lincoln and Bangor) purchased numerous tracts of land in Lincoln and other communities of northern New England, and established ranching operations on a standardized plan. In Lincoln the brothers are known to have built at least ten such operations between 1924 and 1926, when their enterprise went bankrupt. The properties included a small house for the caretaker to live in, a fenced area for the foxes, and an observation tower from which the behavior of the animals could be monitored. This particular farm was probably used until about 1940 for fox farming, by a variety of owners.

== See also ==
- National Register of Historic Places listings in Penobscot County, Maine
