= Corinth Town Hall and Corinthian Lodge No. 59, I.O.O.F. =

- Corinth Town Hall and Corinthian Lodge #59, I.O.O.F.
- U.S. National Register of Historic Places
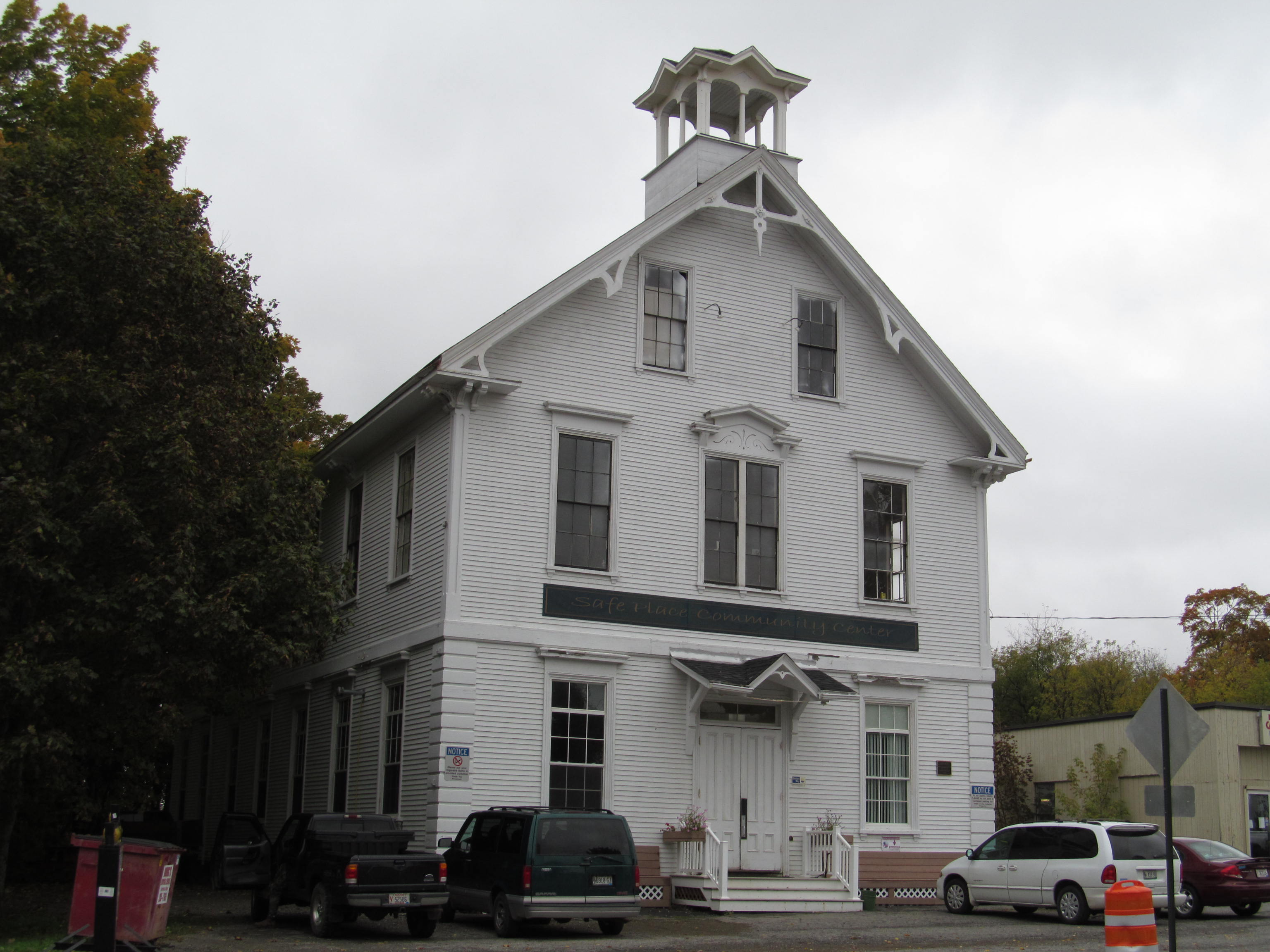

- Location within Maine Location within the United States
- Location: 328 Main St., Corinth, Maine
- Coordinates: 45°0′8″N 69°1′22″W
- Area: 0.3 acres (0.12 ha)
- Built: 1880
- Architectural style: Italianate, Stick/eastlake
- NRHP reference No.: 07001446
- Added to NRHP: January 24, 2008

The former Corinth Town Hall and Corinthian Lodge No. 59, I.O.O.F. is a historic community building at 328 Main Street in Corinth, Maine. Built in 1880 as a joint venture by the town and the local Odd Fellows chapter, it served as Corinth's town hall for about 100 years, and as a major social meeting and event location for the town. The building was listed on the National Register of Historic Places in 2008. The building continues to be used as a community center.

== Description and history ==
The former Corinth Town Hall and IOOF lodge is located on the east side of Main Street (Maine State Route 15) in the center of East Corinth village, just south of its junction with Exeter Road (Maine State Routes 11 and 43). It is a large 2-1/2 story wood frame structure, with a gabled roof topped by a small open square cupola. The exterior is sheathed in clapboards, with its front corners quoined on the first floor and pilastered on the second, rising to paired brackets in the eave. The front-facing gable is decorated with Stick style woodwork. The entrance is in the center of the front, sheltered by a short shed-roof hood with gablet at the center. Windows as tall sash, with cornices above; the central window on the second floor is a more elaborate fixture, with a pair of fixed windows set under a gabled cornice and Eastlake-style carved motif. The interior of the hall was divided, with space formerly used as municipal offices and the town auditorium on the ground floor, and the former IOOF lodge facilities on the second floor and attic level. The IOOF hall retains original murals with symbology of the organization.

The hall was built as a joint venture by the town and the local IOOF chapter, the latter paying for 3/7 of the building's construction and maintenance. The building replaced the town's previous town hall, which was built in 1836 at a different location. Although no architect has been definitively identified for the building, it bears some resemblance to the town hall of Orono, which was designed by Bangor architect George W. Orff and built in 1874. This building is one of East Corinth village's oldest non-residential buildings, surviving several fires. It served not only its formal civic and fraternal functions, but has also historically been a major local venue for social events, political rallies, and even as a gymnasium for the local schools. The IOOF lodge disbanded in 1986, turning its 3/7 share of the property to the town. Since 2006, it has been used by the local food bank.

== See also ==
- National Register of Historic Places listings in Penobscot County, Maine
