= Zebulon Smith House =

Historic house in Maine, United States

- U.S. National Register of Historic Places
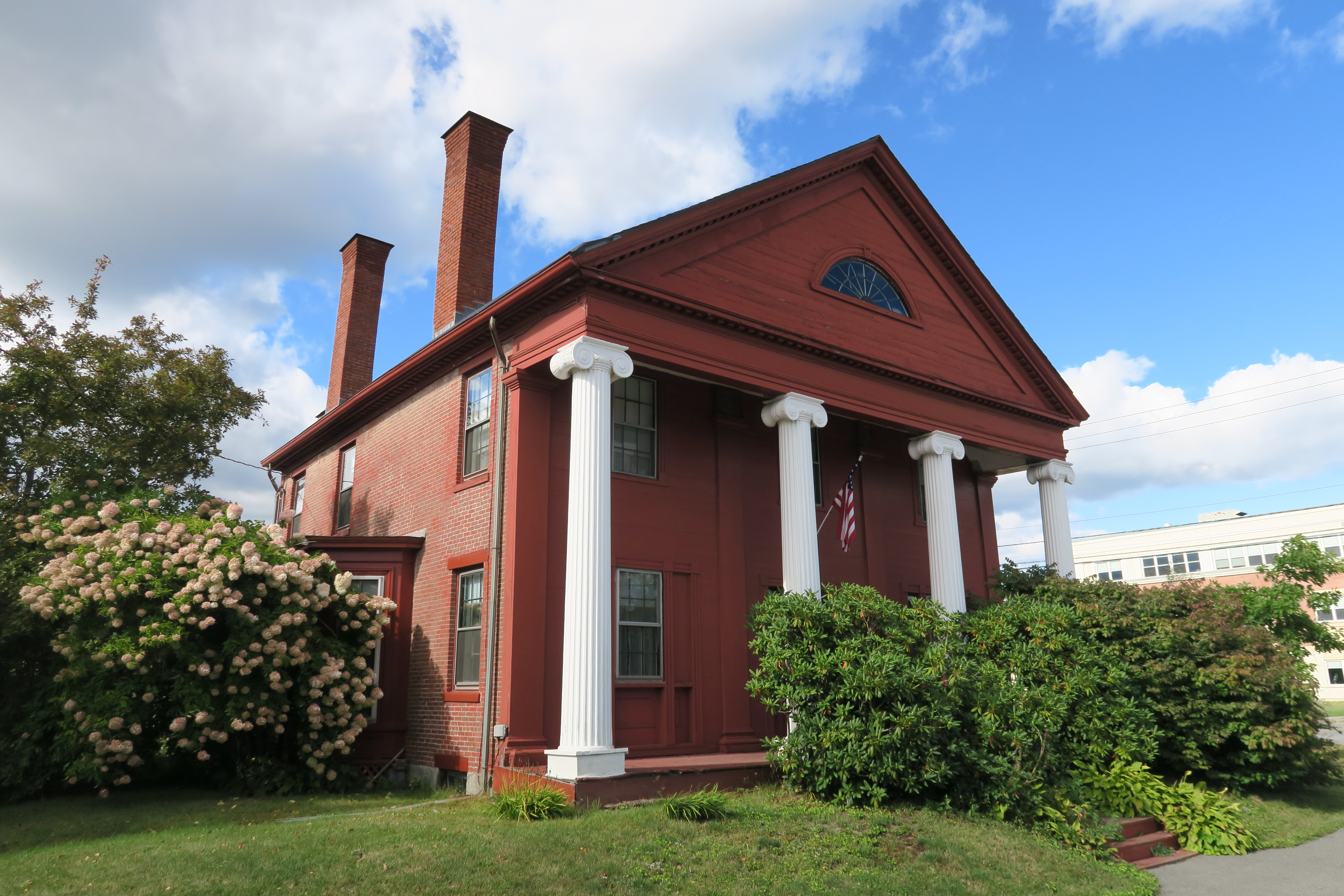
- Zebulon Smith House

- Location within Maine Location within the United States
- Location: 55 Summer St., Bangor, Maine
- Coordinates: 44°47′47″N 68°46′24″W
- Area: 1 acre (0.40 ha)
- Built: 1832
- Architectural style: Greek Revival
- NRHP reference No.: 74000189
- Added to NRHP: January 21, 1974

The Zebulon Smith House is a historic house at 55 Summer Street in Bangor, Maine. Built in 1832, it is one of the two oldest houses (along with the Charles Q. Clapp House in Portland) in the state of Maine to be built with a Greek Revival temple front. The house was listed on the National Register of Historic Places in 1974.

== Description and history ==
The Smith House is set on the northwest side of Summer Street, between it and Main Street (United States Route 202), overlooking Bangor's historic waterfront area. The house is a 2 1/2-story structure, with brick side walls, a matchboarded front facade, and clapboarded rear. It has a roof with the gable oriented toward the front, projecting over the front facade with four large fluted Ionic columns supporting it and an entablature. The gable end is fully pedimented, and is detailed with dentil moulding. A semi-oval fanlight window is located in the center of the recessed tympanum at the gable's center. The front facade behind this temple front has pilasters at the corner and dividing its three bays, with its center entrance flanked by sidelight windows. The side walls are essentially identical, each with a pair of brick chimneys rising above.

The house was built in 1832 for Zebulon Smith, about whom nothing is known; it is surmised that he was a substantial businessman, given the grandeur of the house. The house is, along with the Charles Q. Clapp House (also built in 1832 in Portland), one of the first temple-fronted houses in the state.

== See also ==
- National Register of Historic Places listings in Penobscot County, Maine
