= Penobscot Salmon Club =

- Penobscot Salmon Club and Pool
- U.S. National Register of Historic Places
- Location within Maine Location within the United States
- Nearest city: North Brewer, Maine
- Coordinates: 44°48′30″N 68°44′4″W
- Area: 4 acres (1.6 ha)
- Built: 1923
- NRHP reference No.: 76000109
- Added to NRHP: September 15, 1976

The Penobscot Salmon Club is a historic private fishing club on North Main Street and the Penobscot River in Brewer, Maine. Established in 1887 and incorporated in 1894, it is the oldest fishing club in the United States, and a rare surviving 19th century gentleman's outdoor club. Its facilities on the banks of the river, dating to 1923, were listed on the National Register of Historic Places in 1976.

== Description and history ==
The Penobscot Salmon Club occupies a largely wooded 4-acre (1.6 ha) property north of downtown Brewer, roughly opposite the Eastern Maine Medical Center in Bangor. The site is located next to a shoals on the Penobscot River that has long been known for its productive fishing. The present clubhouse, built in 1923, is a rectangular single-story wood frame structure with a gable roof and wooden shingle siding. The entrance is at one of the gable ends, and a long covered porch extends along its water side. The interior of the building is open, with lockers and racks for fishing rods.

The history of organized fishing at the site of the pool on the Penobscot dates to 1887, when a large clubhouse was built at the site of the present one. The fishing club was formally incorporated in 1894, and the present building, smaller than the original, was built as a replacement in 1923. One of the club's notable traditions has been to send the first salmon caught each season to the President of the United States. The club's property is planned to host a museum dedicated to the Atlantic salmon fishery.

== See also ==
- National Register of Historic Places listings in Penobscot County, Maine
