= Orono Post Office =

- US Post Office-Orono Main
- U.S. National Register of Historic Places
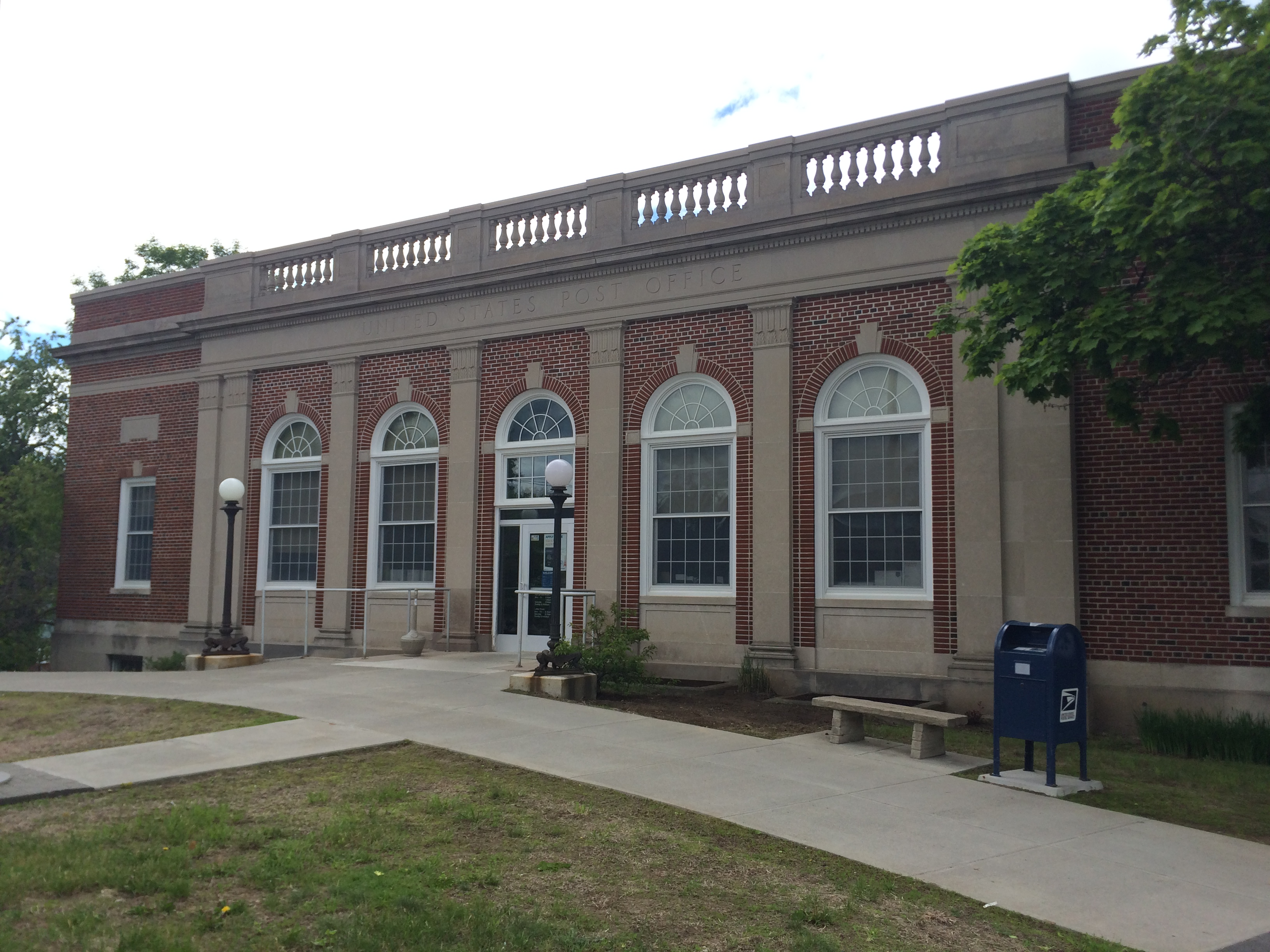
- Orono Post Office as seen in June 2017

- Location within Maine Location within the United States
- Location: 1 Bennoch St., Orono, Maine
- Coordinates: 44°53′2″N 68°40′23″W
- Area: less than one acre
- Built: 1932
- Architect: Office of the Supervising Architect under Louis A. Simon
- Architectural style: Classical Revival
- NRHP reference No.: 86000881
- Added to NRHP: May 2, 1986

The main Orono Post Office is located at 1 Bennoch Street in Orono, Maine. Built in 1933, it is a fine local example of Classical Revival architecture. It was listed on the National Register of Historic Places in 1986.

== Description and history ==
The Orono Post Office is set on a triangular wedge-shaped lot at the northwest corner of Forest and Bennoch Streets, just off Orono's Main Street (United States Route 2). Oriented toward the junction, it is a T-shaped single-story brick and masonry structure with a flat roof and a balustraded parapet. The main facade is seven bays wide, five of which are in a central section that projects slightly. These central bays all feature round-arch openings, with the main entrance in the central one, and windows in the others. The outer two bays have rectangular openings filled with sash windows, topped by a keystone. The central section is flanked by stone pilasters. The interior lobby space of the building features terrazzo marble flooring, marble wainscoting and door trim, and plaster walls with dentil moulding at the cornice. Some of the interior is later 20th-century work, done to match existing original trim.

The building was designed in 1932 by the Office of the Supervising Architect under Louis A. Simon, of the United States Treasury Department, and was completed in 1932. The construction drawings were prepared by a local firm, Stallworth and Davis, as part of an early program to expand job opportunities. Its lobby area underwent a major renovation in the 1980s which included the provision of new aluminum boxes.

== See also ==
- National Register of Historic Places listings in Penobscot County, Maine
- List of United States post offices
