= Colonial Apartments (Bangor, Maine) =

Historic residential building in Maine, United States

- U.S. National Register of Historic Places
- Location within Maine Location within the United States
- Location: 51-53 High St., Bangor, Maine
- Coordinates: 44.8001°N 68.7742°W
- Area: less than one acre
- Built: 1919
- Architect: Hodgins, Victor
- Architectural style: Colonial Revival
- NRHP reference No.: 12001067
- Added to NRHP: December 19, 2012

The Colonial Apartments are a historic apartment building at 51-53 High Street in Bangor, Maine. Built in 1919, it is one of the oldest and best-preserved apartment houses in the city that was marketed to a middle and upper-class population. The building was listed on the National Register of Historic Places in 2012.

== Description and history ==
The Colonial Apartments stand near the western edge of Bangor's central business district, on the west side of High Street opposite Middle Street. It is a three-story "double triple-decker", built out of brick in the Colonial Revival style. It has a flat roof and an unadorned cornice, with pilasters at the corner, and symmetrically placed wooden porches at the center of the main facade. The interior is divided into six apartments, two per floor, separated by a party wall and accessed via separate stairwells in each half. The apartment interiors have retained much of their original finish, including fireplace mantels and woodwork.

The apartment house was built in 1919 to a design by local architect Victor Hodgins, on a parcel that previously held a much larger housing complex destroyed by fire. It was one of the first purpose-built apartment buildings in the city, as differentiated from tenement-style worker housing, which had existed in the city in limited amounts since the 1890s. This apartment house was set in a neighborhood of more elegant middle-class houses, and was typically occupied by white collar workers. A significant number of its units were also occupied by either single women, or pairs of women (including widowed mothers with adult daughters), marking the start of a trend away from single women either boarding in private homes, or living in more communal boarding house arrangements.

== See also ==
- National Register of Historic Places listings in Penobscot County, Maine
