= Joseph W. Low House =

Historic house in Maine, United States

- U.S. National Register of Historic Places
- Location within Maine Location within the United States
- Location: 51 Highland St., Bangor, Maine
- Coordinates: 44°48′23″N 68°47′0″W
- Area: 2 acres (0.81 ha)
- Built: 1857
- Architect: Harvey Graves
- Architectural style: Italianate
- NRHP reference No.: 73000138
- Added to NRHP: December 4, 1973

The Joseph W. Low House is a historic house at 51 Highland Street in Bangor, Maine. Built in 1857 in the city's then-fashionable Thomas Hill neighborhood, it is one of northern Maine's finest examples of Italianate architecture. It was listed on the National Register of Historic Places in 1973.

== Description and history ==
The Low House is located on the north side of Thomas Hill Road, immediately south of the Thomas Hill Standpipe on Thomas Hill, a rise overlooking Kenduskeag Stream and downtown Bangor. It is a two-story wood-frame structure, its main block roughly square, with a hip roof topped by an octagonal cupola. The front of the house is finished in wooden clapboards, while the side walls are finished in flushboarding configured to resemble stonework. The front (south-facing) facade is symmetrically arranged, three bays across, with a center entrance sheltered by a multi-columned porch. The window above the entrance is a double window, while the windows flanking the entrance have segmented-arch tops, and have bracketed hoods above. The second-floor windows have elaborate Italianate surrounds, and there are paired brackets in the roof eave. A porch extends along part of the left side.

The house was designed by Harvey Graves and built in 1857 for Joseph Low, a wealthy man of unknown business who moved to California after the American Civil War. The Thomas Hill area was at that time promoted as a new fashionable neighborhood, due in part to the views it furnished, as the previously fashionable area, Broadway, had become built out.

== See also ==
- National Register of Historic Places listings in Penobscot County, Maine
