= Dixmont Town House =

- U.S. National Register of Historic Places
- Location within Maine Location within the United States
- Location: 702 Western Ave., Dixmont, Maine
- Coordinates: 44°41′6″N 69°8′3″W
- Area: Less than one acre
- Built: 1836
- NRHP reference No.: 14000361
- Added to NRHP: June 27, 2014

The Dixmont Town House is a historic civic and community building at 702 Western Avenue in Dixmont, Maine. Built in 1836, it is one of a few well-preserved early town halls in Maine that served a strictly civic purpose. It was used by the town for its town meetings until 1952, and has been restored to an early 20th-century appearance. It was listed on the National Register of Historic Places in 2014.

== Description and history ==
The Dixmont Town House is located not far from the geographic center of Dixmont, on south side of Western Avenue (Maine State Route 9/United States Route 202), the town's major east-west thoroughfare. It is a small single-story wood frame structure, measuring about 35.5 by 40.5 feet (10.8 m × 12.3 m). It has a gabled roof, wooden clapboard siding, and a granite foundation. It is oriented with the roof ridge roughly parallel to the road, with the street facing facade composed of two sash windows flanking a central batten door. The main entrance, also a batten door, is on the eastern facade, framed by simple trim elements, as are the windows. The building interior consists of a single chamber, with wide wainscoting below original plaster walls, and original wide pine floors.

The town house is generally given a construction date of 1836, when the property was deeded to the town. Its styling and workmanship are suggestive of an earlier construction date, but the town is known to have met in other buildings prior to 1820. It is one of the oldest surviving town houses in the state, built for strictly secular civic uses, in the state; only the Turner Town House (1831) is known to be older. The building underwent a major restoration under the auspices of the local historical society between 2008 and 2013, restoring it to verny near its early 20th-century appearance.

== See also ==
- National Register of Historic Places listings in Penobscot County, Maine
