= Battleship Maine Monument =

- U.S. National Register of Historic Places
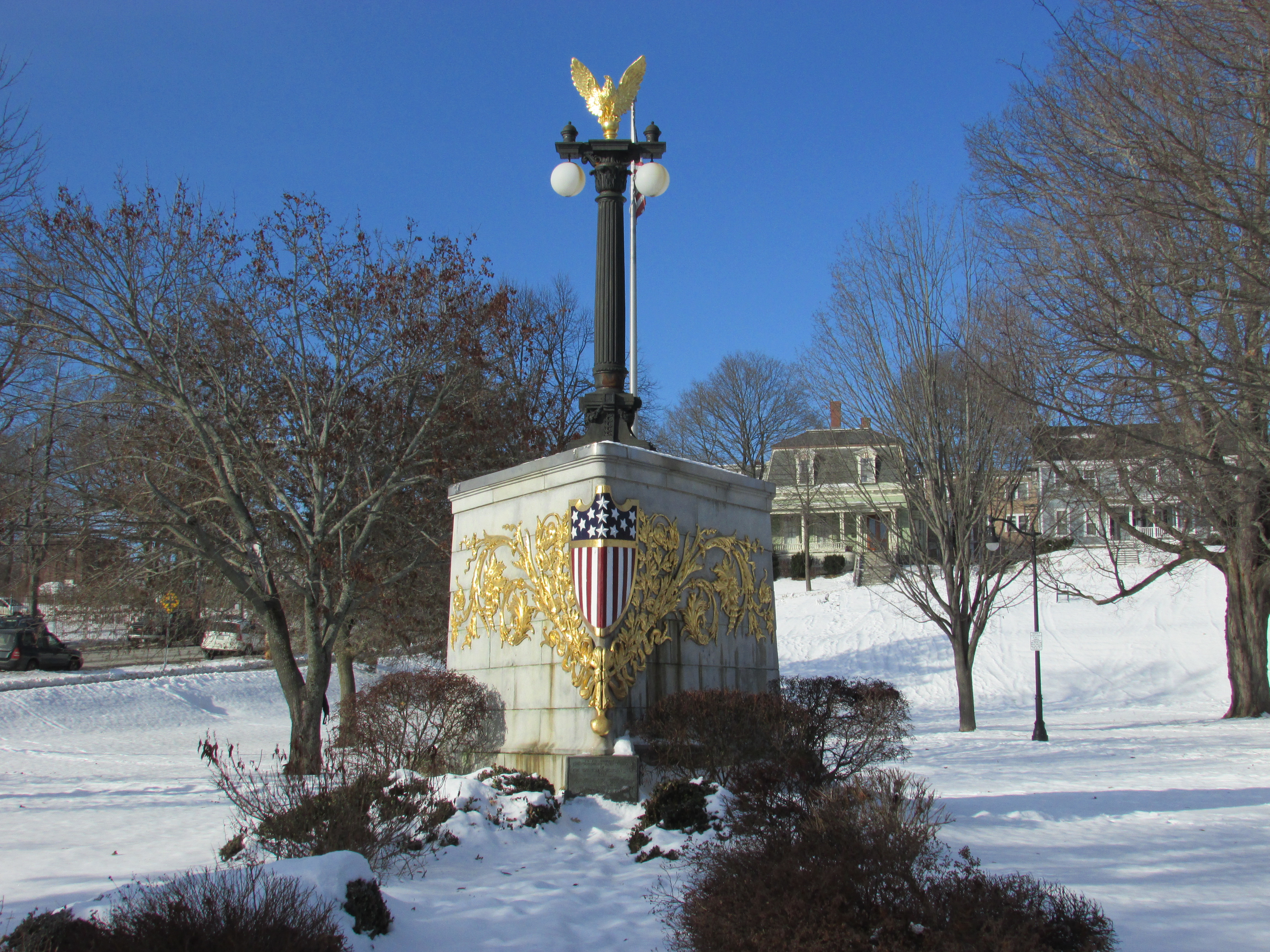

- Location within Maine Location within the United States
- Location: Davenport Park, Jct. of Main and Cedar Sts., Bangor, Maine
- Coordinates: 44.7974°N 68.7738°W
- Area: less than one acre
- Built: 1922
- Architect: Kent, Edwin S.
- NRHP reference No.: 99001187
- Added to NRHP: October 8, 1999

The Battleship Maine Monument is a memorial marker in Davenport Park, Bangor, Maine. It commemorates veterans of the Spanish–American War, and the loss of the USS Maine due to an explosion of unknown cause, which sparked the start of the war. Placed in 1922, it includes the shield and scrolls of the Maine, which were recovered from its wreckage in the harbor of Havana, Cuba. The memorial was listed on the National Register of Historic Places in 1999. Of several memorials to that war and the loss of the Maine, it is the most elaborate in the state.

== Description ==
The Battleship Maine Monument stands on the east side of Davenport Park, a city park south of downtown Bangor, near the corner of Main and Cedar Streets. It is approached from Main Street via a path lined by plantings, with benches nearby. The monument is triangular in shape, with 12 feet (3.7 m) sides, and is mounted on a plinth of granite. The monument is composed of blocks of ashlar granite, and is capped by a slightly projecting cornice. The overall effect is that of the prow of a ship. Affixed to the leading edge are the shields and scrolls of the USS Maine. The memorial is topped by a bronze light standard with an eagle at its crown. The plinth has a bronze plaque bearing the following inscription:

To the memory of the soldiers and sailor of the Spanish–American War 1989. Shield and scrolls recovered from wreckage of USS Maine blown up Havana Harbor, Cuba February 15, A.D. 1898. Erected by the city of Bangor, A.D. 1922

== History ==
The USS Maine was an armored cruiser of the United States Navy, and was the first US Navy vessel named after the state of Maine. She was sent in January 1898 to Havana, Cuba as a precautionary measure to ensure the safety of Americans in the ongoing Cuban War of Independence. On February 15, 1898, an explosion (whose cause continues to be debated) aboard the ship resulted in its rapid sinking, and the loss of three-quarters of its crew. This event greatly heightened tensions that led directly to the outbreak of the Spanish–American War.

Elements of the ship were recovered during salvage operations in 1912, a number of which now appear in monuments and memorials to the war. Bangor Mayor Flavius O. Beal and Congressman Frank E. Guernsey successfully lobbied for the city's receipt of the ship's shield and scrolls, which were to become the focus of the city's monument. A committee formed in 1917 to identify a location for the memorial selected the Post Office Mall, and design work was commissioned. The work languished until 1920, when a city employee sold the ship relics for scrap. The city recovered most of them, and the act spurred renewed action. A new site in Davenport Park was selected, and the design was produced by Edwin S. Kent, a local architect. The memorial was constructed at a cost of $5,300, and was dedicated on October 17, 1922.

Other public memorials to the Maine and the war in the state include one of the ship's cannons at Fort Allen Park in Portland, and a recovered projectile in Lewiston. The USS Maine Mast Memorial is in Arlington National Cemetery, and the principal national memorial to the Maine is the USS Maine National Monument in New York City.

== See also ==
- National Register of Historic Places listings in Penobscot County, Maine
