= George W. Smith Homestead =

Historic house in Maine, United States

- U.S. National Register of Historic Places
- Pictured in 1979

- Location within Maine Location within the United States
- Location: Main St., Mattawamkeag, Maine
- Coordinates: 45°30′54″N 68°21′15″W
- Area: 0.5 acres (0.20 ha)
- Built: 1874
- Architectural style: Italianate
- NRHP reference No.: 80000249
- Added to NRHP: January 15, 1980

The George W. Smith Homestead is a historic house on Main Street in Mattawamkeag, Maine. Built in 1874 by the son of one of the town's early settlers, the Italianate-style house is the only house of significant architectural merit in the small community. It was listed on the National Register of Historic Places in 1980.

== Description and history ==
The Smith Homestead is set back from the east side of Main Street (United States Route 2) in the village center of Mattawamkeag, a rural community at the confluence of the Mattawamkeag and Penobscot Rivers. It is a two-story wood-frame structure, with a hip roof, two interior chimneys, clapboard siding, and a granite foundation. Its main facade, facing west, is three bays wide, with a central entrance sheltered by a single-story porch supported by square posts. The roof is topped by a cupola with arched windows and finial, and has a bracketed cornice. An ell extends the house to the rear, joining it to a barn and giving the entire complex an L shape. The main barn door also faces west, with a pair of dormers in the roof above.

Asa Smith was one of Mattawamkeag's early white settlers, and occupied a prominent position in the community, running a store and serving in the state legislature. His son George built in this house in 1874, and continued his father's retail operation, also serving as the local postmaster for many years. The house is the only one of significant architectural distinction in the community, and has remained relatively unaltered since its construction.

== See also ==
- National Register of Historic Places listings in Penobscot County, Maine
