= William Colburn House =

Historic house in Maine, United States

- U.S. National Register of Historic Places
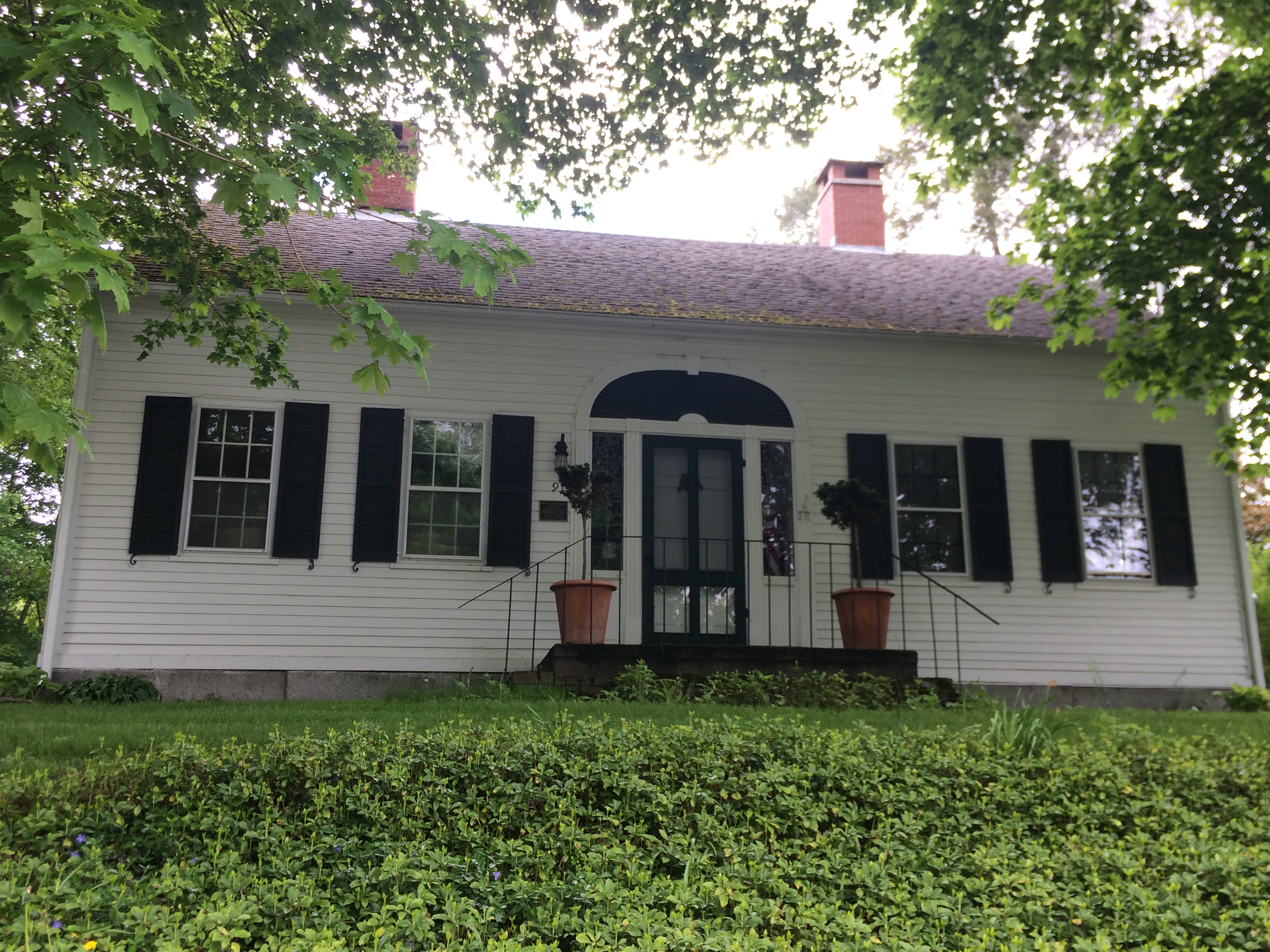
- The William Colburn House as seen in June 2017.

- Location within Maine Location within the United States
- Location: 91 Bennoch Rd., Orono, Maine
- Coordinates: 44°53′19″N 68°40′42″W
- Area: 1 acre (0.40 ha)
- Built: 1780
- Built by: Colburn, William
- Architectural style: Colonial, Cape Cod
- NRHP reference No.: 73000134
- Added to NRHP: June 19, 1973

The William Colburn House is a historic house at 91 Bennoch Road in Orono, Maine, United States. It was built about 1780 by William Colburn, one of the area's first white settlers, and is one of the few 18th-century houses surviving in Maine's central interior. It was listed on the National Register of Historic Places in 1973.

== Description and history ==
The William Colburn House is located north of Orono's downtown, on the west side of Bennoch Road (Maine State Route 16), between Noyes and Winterhaven Drives. It is set on a terrace above the road, and would at one time have had views of the Stillwater River. The house is a 1 1/2-story Cape style wood-frame structure, five bays wide, with a side gable roof, two interior brick chimneys, clapboard siding, and a granite foundation. The center bay contains an unusually wide doorway, that includes flanking sidelight windows and a fanlight. The interior of the house retains original woodwork and finishes, include wide pine floors, wainscoting, and a large kitchen fireplace with crane and builtin ovens.

The house was built in 1780 by William Colburn, who first arrived in the area in 1774 with his father Jeremiah. They fled the area at the outbreak of the American Revolutionary War in 1775, and returned in 1780, at which time they built two houses. One of them was destroyed by fire. This house is believed to be one of the oldest surviving 18th-century houses at such a great distance from the coast of Maine.

== See also ==
- National Register of Historic Places listings in Penobscot County, Maine
