= Sargent-Roberts House =

Historic house in Maine, United States

- U.S. National Register of Historic Places
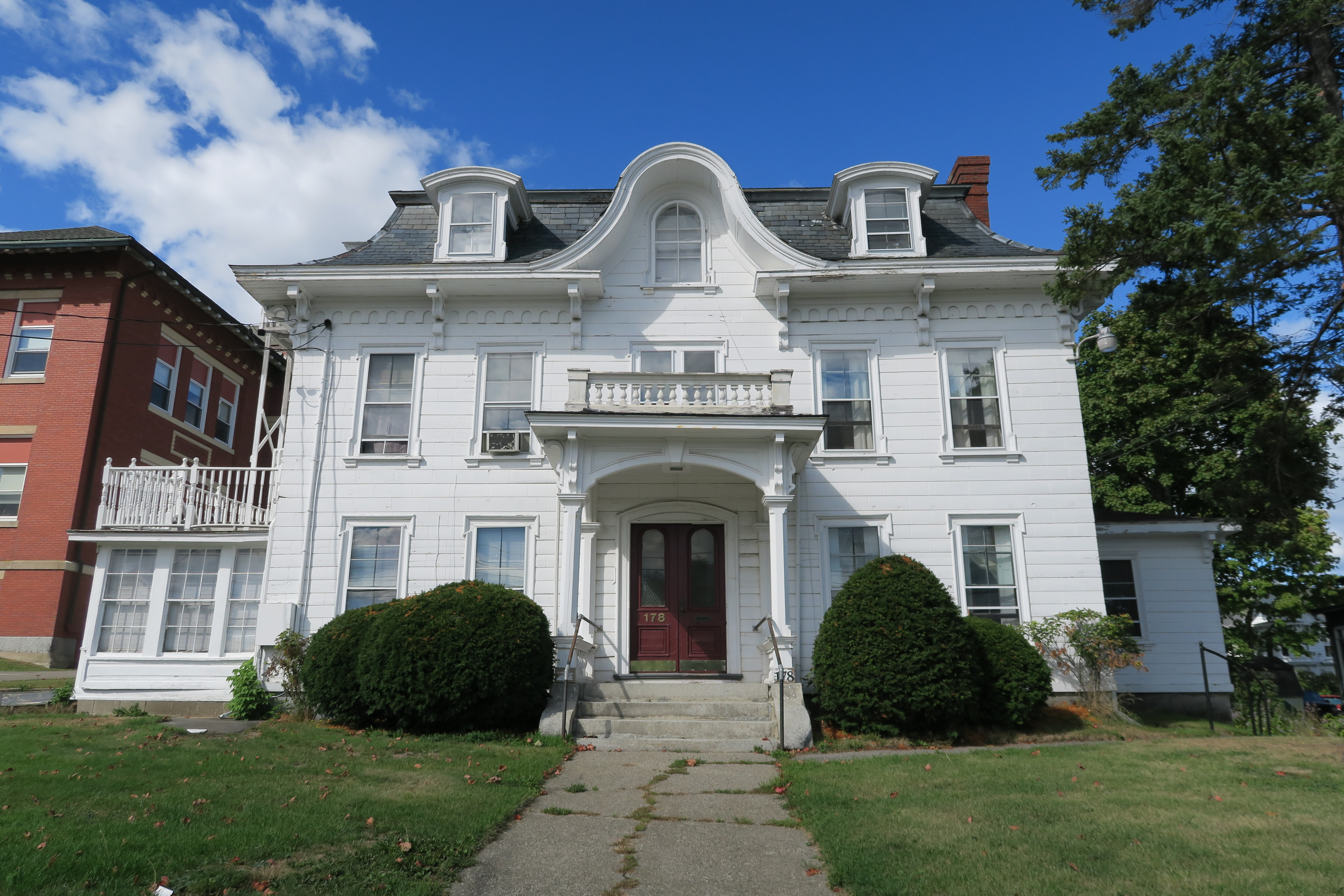
- Sargent-Roberts House

- Location within Maine Location within the United States
- Location: 178 State St., Bangor, Maine
- Coordinates: 44°48′17″N 68°45′51″W
- Area: less than one acre
- Built: 1814
- Architectural style: Second Empire, Federal
- MPS: Historic Residential Architecture of Bangor MPS
- NRHP reference No.: 96001476
- Added to NRHP: December 13, 1996

The Sargent-Roberts House is a historic house at 178 State Street in Bangor, Maine. Built in 1814 and restyled several times, the house exemplifies a local trend to update high-quality houses to the latest styles in 19th-century Bangor. The house's exterior is a Second Empire alteration of a Federal period structure, with an interior exhibiting Federal and Greek Revival features. It was listed on the National Register of Historic Places in 1996.

== Description and history ==
The Sargent-Roberts House is located on the north side of State Street (United States Route 2), a short way east of Bangor's downtown business district, between Grove Street and Forest Avenue. It is a 2 1/2-story wood-frame structure, five bays wide, with a flared mansard roof and matchboard siding. The roof has a wide eave supported by decorative brackets, and has a central bell-shaped gable flanked by segmented-arch dormers. The centered entrance is sheltered by an elaborately decorated portico supported by pillars and pilasters joined by arches. To each side of the main block are single-story flanking elements, and there is a two-story addition extending the house to the rear, where modern fire escape stairs mar the building's appearance. The interior has retained significant Federal and Greek Revival woodwork and fireplace surrounds, despite its conversion to apartments.

The house was known to be under construction in 1814, when Bangor was occupied by British troops during the War of 1812. It was built by Edward Sargent, a local builder who sold the house in the 1830s to focus on farming. The buyer, Amos Roberts, was involved in the locally important lumber business, and probably added the Greek Revival elements soon after purchasing it. Roberts was also responsible for the major restyling that took place in 1866, giving the house its Second Empire features. Based on stylistic analysis, it is likely that the noted local architect Benjamin S. Deane was involved in the design of these alterations, as they closely resemble other work in Bangor known to be his.

== See also ==
- National Register of Historic Places listings in Penobscot County, Maine
