= Hexagon Barn =

- U.S. National Register of Historic Places
- Location within Maine Location within the United States
- Location: Spring and Railroad Sts., Newport, Maine
- Coordinates: 44°50′4″N 69°16′33.7″W
- Area: 0.3 acres (0.12 ha)
- Built: 1850
- Architectural style: Greek Revival
- NRHP reference No.: 80000412
- Added to NRHP: January 24, 1980

The Hexagon Barn of Newport, Maine is believed to be the only building of its type in the state of Maine. Located at Spring and Railroad Streets, it is attached to a c. 1850 Greek Revival Cape, and is believed to date to that time. It was listed on the National Register of Historic Places in 1980.

== Description and history ==
The hexagonal barn is located in the village of Newport, on a property at the northeast corner of Spring and Railroad Streets. Set near the street corner is a 1-1/2 story Cape style house with modest Greek Revival styling. Extending eastward, parallelling Railroad Street is a single-story ell, which joins the house to the barn. The barn is a two-story wood frame structure, with a hexagonal roof topped by a louvered six-sided cupola, and clapboard siding. Each of its six sides is of roughly equal length, and there are two windows, one set in the southwest wall on the second floor, and one set in the northeast wall on the northeast wall. There are four doors, two each on the eastern and northern sides, one on each level. The northern ground floor entrance was originally a typical two-leaf hinged door, but has been replaced by an overhead garage door.

The barn's construction date and builder are unknown. It is assumed to have been built around the same time as the house, which is dated stylistically to about 1850. Surveys of state cultural inventory conducted prior to its listing on the National Register in 1980 have failed to identify any other six-sided barns in the state.

== See also ==
- National Register of Historic Places listings in Penobscot County, Maine
