= Godfrey-Kellogg House =

Historic house in Maine, United States

- U.S. National Register of Historic Places
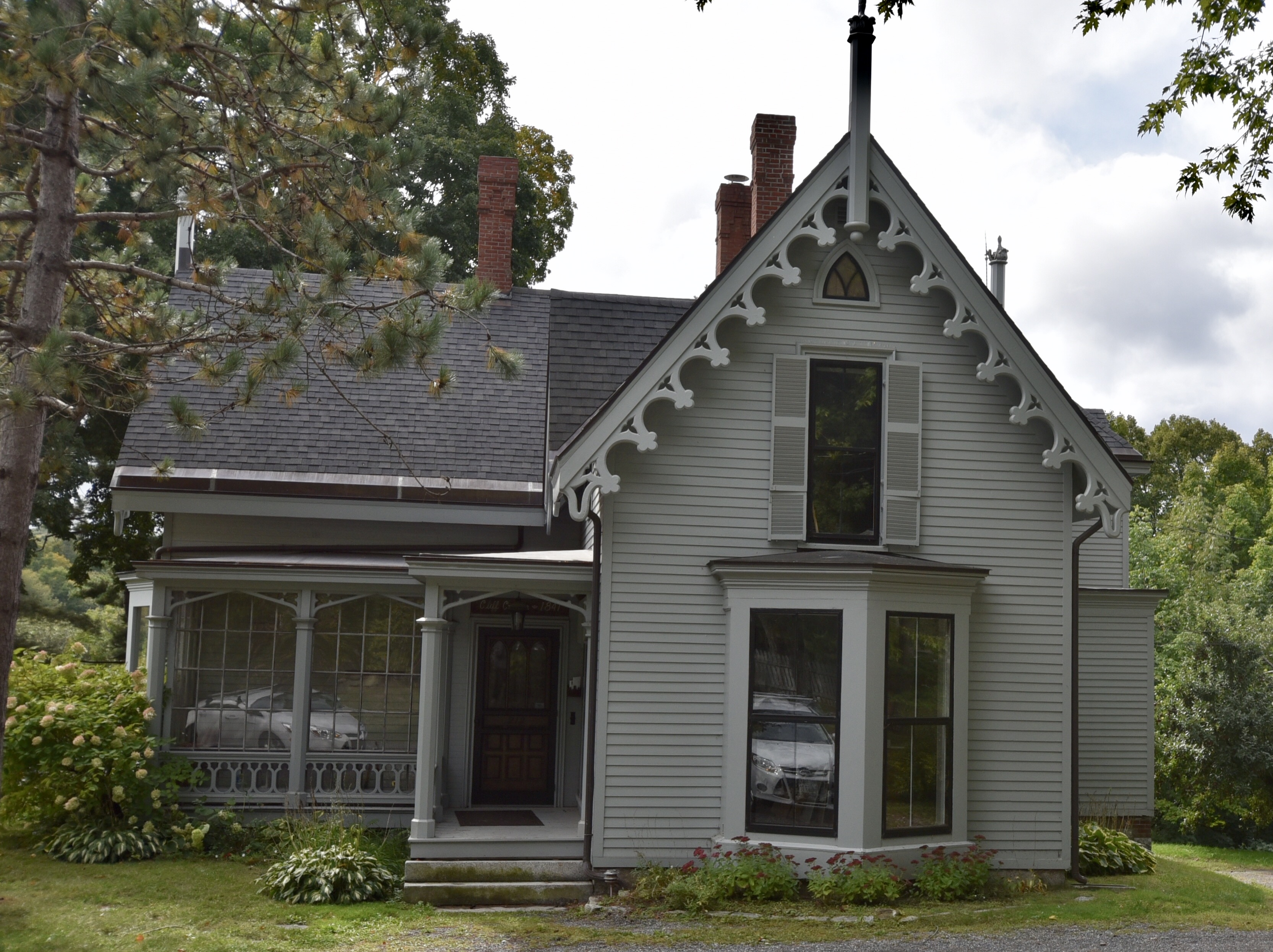

- Location within Maine Location within the United States
- Location: 212 Kenduskeag Ave. Bangor, Maine
- Coordinates: 44.8128°N 68.7797°W
- Area: 2 acres (0.81 ha)
- Built: 1847
- Architectural style: Gothic Revival
- NRHP reference No.: 73000136
- Added to NRHP: June 18, 1973

The Godfrey-Kellogg House is a historic house at 212 Kenduskeag Avenue in Bangor, Maine, USA. Built in about 1847, it is one of the state's finest and least-altered examples of residential Gothic Revival architecture. It was listed on the National Register of Historic Places in 1973.

== Description and history ==
The Godfrey-Kellog House stands north of downtown Bangor, on the west side of Kenduskeag Avenue, overlooking Kenduskeag Stream. The house is a rambling 1 1/2-story wood-frame structure, with a variety of projecting bays, gable dormers, and other architectural details. Its gables are adorned with jigsawn vergeboard, with the main gables topped by decorative finials. Walls are finished mainly in vertical board-and-batten siding, with some elements clapboarded and others finished in flushboard. Its porches are topped by low jigsawn balustrades. The house sits on 2 acres (0.81 ha) of land, along with a similarly decorated barn, carriage house, and dog house. The barn and carriage house both have living quarters on the upper level.

The house was built about 1847 for John Godfrey, as a summer residence for his family; its architect is unknown. At the time of its construction, it would have had a view of the Bangor downtown, and of the nearby Morse Mill and covered bridge (neither of which is now standing). The property is notable for its architecture, and its state of preservation, having had relatively little alteration to either the interiors or exteriors of any of the buildings.

== See also ==
- National Register of Historic Places listings in Penobscot County, Maine
