= Old Fire Engine House =

- U.S. National Register of Historic Places
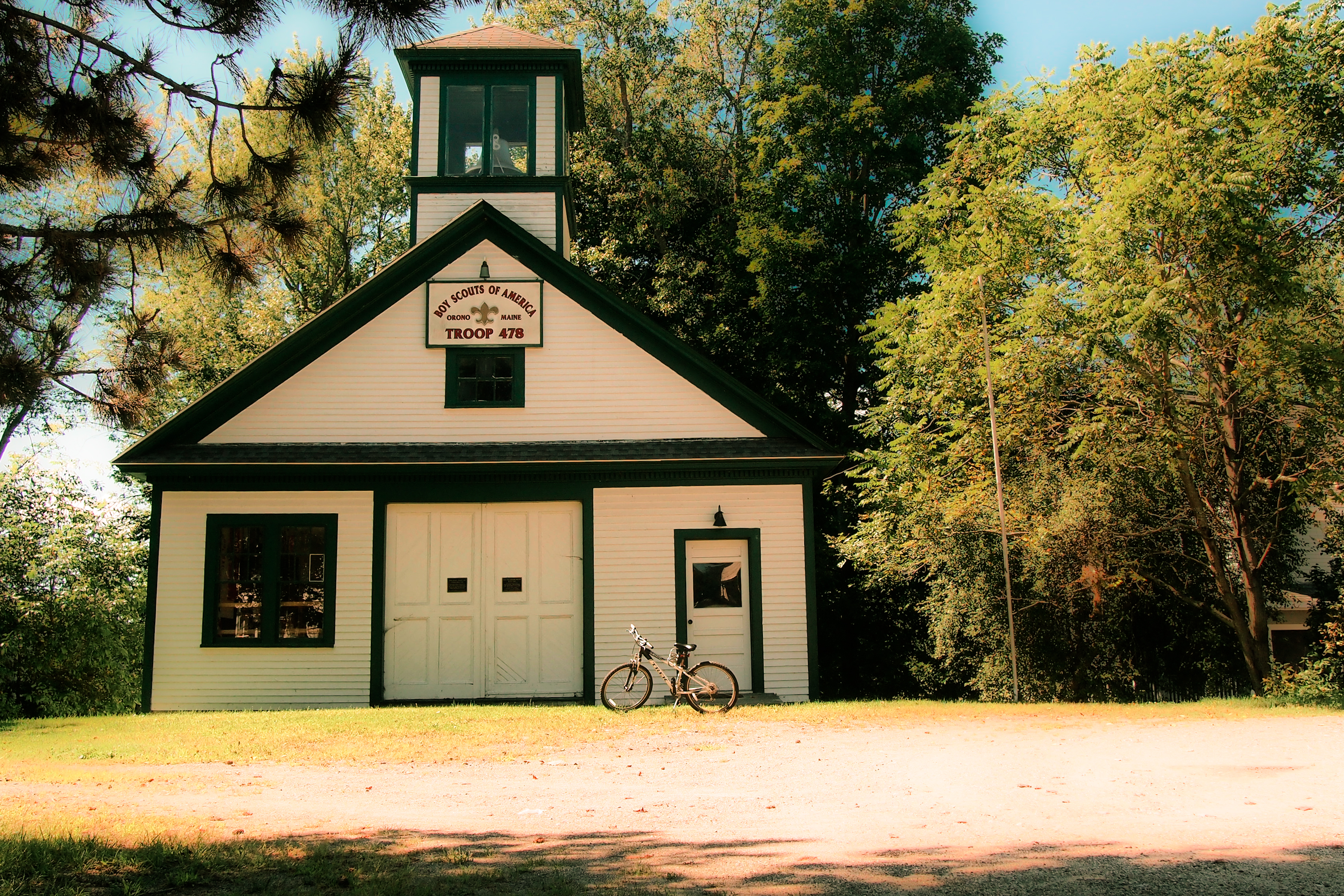
- Location: North Main Street, Orono, Maine
- Coordinates: 44°53′7″N 68°39′49″W
- Area: less than one acre
- Built: 1892
- Architectural style: Colonial Revival
- NRHP reference No.: 85002181
- Added to NRHP: September 12, 1985

The Old Fire Engine House is a historic fire station on North Main Avenue in Orono, Maine. Built in 1892, it is a well-preserved example of a late-19th century wooden fire station. It was added to the National Register of Historic Places on September 12, 1985. It is now used by Boy Scout Troop 478, which is in the Katahdin Area Council.

== Description and history ==
The Old Fire Engine House is located on the south side of North Main Avenue, opposite the end of Pond Street. It is built into the side of a slope down to the Stillwater River, presenting 1 1/2 stories to the street and a full second story on the south (river-facing) side. It is a wood-framed structure, with a front-facing gable roof and clapboard siding. The roof is topped by a belfry with a pyramidal roof, and there is a hose drying tower at the southern end. The front gable is pedimented, and there is a paneled double door in the central equipment bay, with a pedestrian door to the right and a doubled window to the left. The interior retains original woodwork finishes, including tongue-and-groove paneling on the walls and molded architrave trim with corner blocks on the windows.

The town of Orono is divided by the Stillwater River, complicating the provision of fire services. Its earliest fire services, established in the 1830s, were volunteer services, but the first engine house was not built until the 1860s. It was built on the south side of the river, where the town center is located, while the engine for the north side was stored in other buildings. In 1892, the town authorized the construction of this building as a permanent structure for the engine (on the main level) and the horses to draw it (on the basement level down the hill). The bell was used to summon the volunteers.

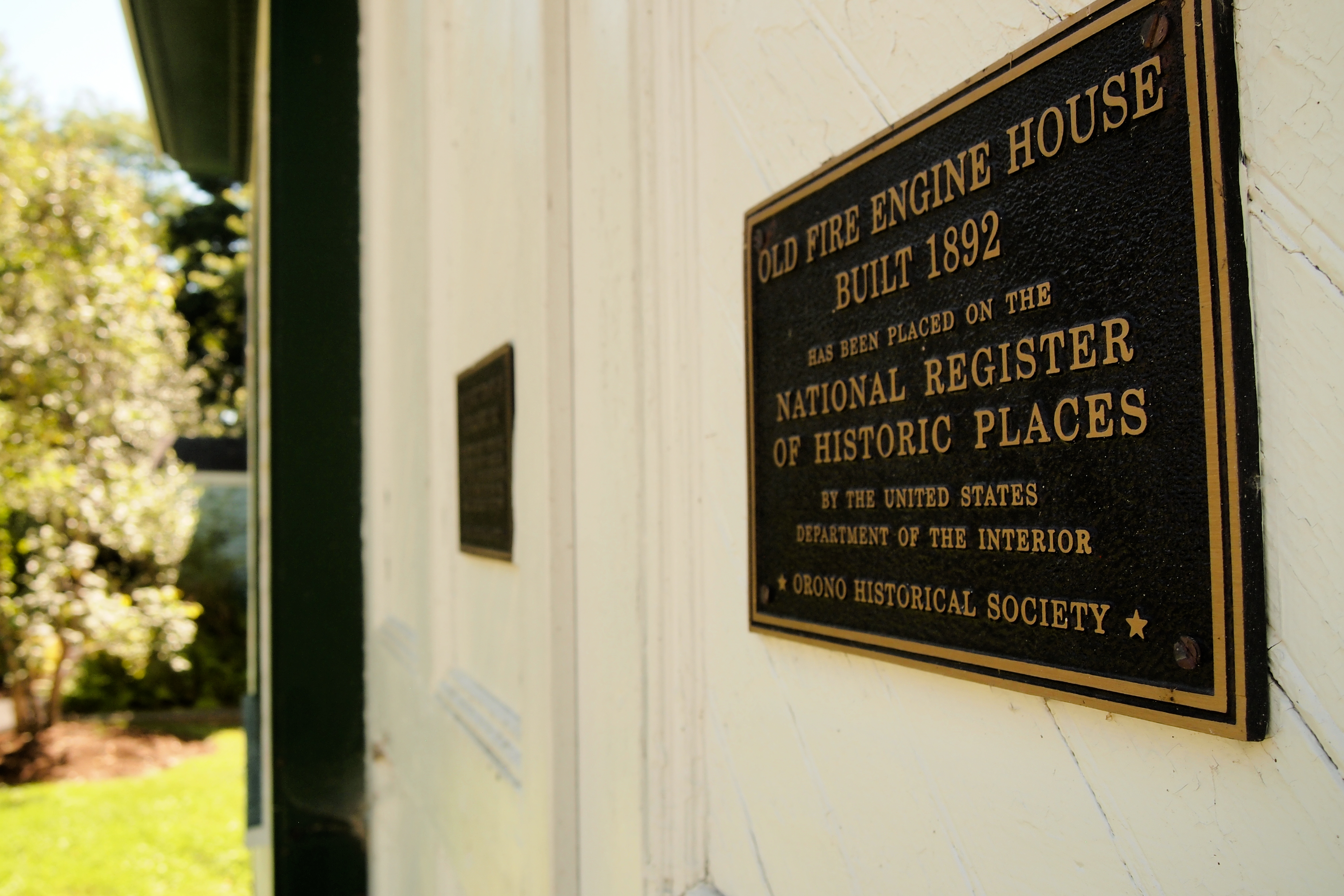
National Register of Historic Places Plaque

== See also ==
- National Register of Historic Places listings in Penobscot County, Maine
