= Enterprise Grange, No. 173 =

- U.S. National Register of Historic Places
- Location within Maine Location within the United States
- Location: 446 Dow Rd., Orrington, Maine
- Coordinates: 44°43′14″N 68°47′20″W
- Area: 1.5 acres (0.61 ha)
- Built: 1884
- Architectural style: Italianate
- NRHP reference No.: 07001447
- Added to NRHP: January 24, 2008

The Enterprise Grange, No. 173 is a historic Grange hall at 446 Dow Road in Orrington, Maine. Built in 1884 and enlarged in the early 20th century, this modest Italianate building has been a significant social and civic center in the rural community since its construction. It was listed on the National Register of Historic Places in 2008.

== Description and history ==
The Enterprise Grange hall is located near the geographic center of the rural community of Orrington, on a wedge-shaped parcel at the southeast corner of Dow Road and Center Drive. It is a tall single-story structure, three bays wide, with front-facing gable roof, clapboard siding, and a foundation of concrete piers. A lower single-story dining room wing extends to the rear, with the kitchen in an ell extending to the south. The main facade faces west, and is symmetrically composed, with a center entrance sheltered by a hood with ornate Italianate brackets. Sash windows flank the entrance in the side bays, and in the gable able, with bracketed cornices above them. The side walls of the main block have similarly-styled windows.

The Enterprise Grange (Patrons of Husbandry) was organized in Orrington, a community then dominated by agriculture, in 1875, and purchased land for a building two years later, and the main hall was built in 1884 by the Grange membership with locally milled lumber. The group struggled financially in its early years, but had by the early 20th century reached a better financial footing, at which time the dining room and kitchen were added. The building was electrified in 1934, a heating system add in 1951, and its kitchen updated in 1961. The building's auditorium and stage have served not just as a meeting point for the Grange's activities, but have also served since construction as a major social venue for the town, hosting weddings, suppers, church services, and other social events. In the 1920s its stage was relocated to better accommodate theatrical performances.

== See also ==
- National Register of Historic Places listings in Penobscot County, Maine
