= Young Site =

- U.S. National Register of Historic Places
- Nearest city: Alton, Maine
- Area: 1 acre (0.40 ha)
- NRHP reference No.: 76000110
- Added to NRHP: March 26, 1976

The Young Site is a prehistoric Native American archaeological site in Alton, Maine. Located on the banks of Pushaw Stream, the site has yielded evidence of human habitation between c. 3000 BCE and 1000 CE, and included human burials. The site was listed on the National Register of Historic Places in 1976.

== Description ==
The Young Site is located on the north bank of Pushaw Stream, a tributary of the Penobscot River, not far from its confluence with Dead Stream in southern Alton. On the opposite bank, in the Hirundo Wildlife Refuge, is a second site known as the Hirundo Site. Analysis of the geology of the area suggests that, at the time of the earliest dated occupations of these sites, a lake was located just upstream, which periodically inundated one or the other of the sites, and was probably surrounded by marshes with cattails. The oldest materials at Young are from the Laurentian tradition, including several projectile points typical of that period. The burial found at the site dates to the Susquehanna period (c. 1700 BCE), determined by both radiocarbon dating and by the method of burial, which included cremation. The latest period of occupation was found to be the Late Ceramic (c. 1000 CE), although occupation continued for a longer period at Hirundo. Also recovered from the site were more than 30 types of fish vertebrae, suggesting fishing was a major activity at the site.

== See also ==
- National Register of Historic Places listings in Penobscot County, Maine
