= District No. 5 School House (Hermon, Maine) =

- District #5 School House
- U.S. National Register of Historic Places
- Location within Maine Location within the United States
- Location: Billings Rd., 0.15 NE of jct. of US 2 and Billings Rd., Hermon, Maine
- Coordinates: 44°48′42″N 68°54′36″W
- Area: less than one acre
- Built: 1880
- Architectural style: Italianate, Stick/eastlake
- NRHP reference No.: 97001131
- Added to NRHP: September 11, 1997

The District No. 5 School House is a historic school building on Billings Road at School House Lane in Hermon, Maine. Probably built about 1880, it is the rural community's best-preserved one-room schoolhouse, and is now maintained by the local historical society. It was listed on the National Register of Historic Places in 1997.

== Description and history ==
The District No. 5 School House is located in the village of Hermon, north of United States Route 2 at the western corner of Billings Road and School House Lane. It is a single-story wood frame structure, with a front-gable roof and clapboard siding. The gable has applied Stick style woodwork at its peak and ends. The front facade, facing toward Billings Road, has two widely spaced doorways, each topped by a bracketed cornice with a mini-gable. Windows on the side elevations are similarly decorated, where there are paired brackets in the eave. The entrances lead into small vestibules, which provide access to the classroom that occupies most of the rest of the building. The walls are finished in wainscoting below, and plaster above, except for one area that has been reconstructed with wallboard.

Local tradition assigns a construction date of 1852 to this building, about the time the town was divided into thirteen school districts. However, architectural evidence suggests a later construction date, c. 1880. It remained in use as a school until 1953, and then sat vacant until the early 1980s, when the local rescue squad adapted it for its use, adding a garage door to the front. This and other alterations were reversed during a restoration of the building in 1988 by the local historical society. The town had six district schools standing when they were closed in 1953; all of the others have been altered or demolished.

== See also ==
- National Register of Historic Places listings in Penobscot County, Maine
