= Archeological Site No. 74-2 =

- Maine Archeological Survey Site #74-2
- U.S. National Register of Historic Places
- Nearest city: Indian Island, Maine
- Area: 3 acres (1.2 ha)
- NRHP reference No.: 84001486
- Added to NRHP: January 26, 1984

Archeological Site No. 74-2 is a prehistoric site in Indian Island, Maine. Located on a terrace above the Penobscot River, the site dates to the Middle Archaic Period (c. 5500 BCE), a rarity in Maine, made even more unusual by the absence of later period artifacts. The site was listed on the National Register of Historic Places in 1984 (as Maine Archaeological Survey Site), for its potential to increase what is known about Native settlement patterns in the area.

== Description ==
Indian Island, Maine is the site of the Penobscot Indian Island Reservation, with a long documented historical and prehistoric occupation by Native Americans. The island is located in the Penobscot River, between Milford and Old Town. Occupation of the island by the Penobscots has been documented since the 17th century, and the island's archaeological record of human activity goes back at least 7,500 years.

Site 74-2 is one of its oldest sites, and is located on a terrace overlooking the river. It occupies the lowest of a series of terraces, where the higher ones have a geology less favorable to Native use, where test pits yielded no finds. At the time of the site's listing on the National Register in 1984, it had only been subjected to test excavations. These yielded two important artifacts, a Neville phase point dated to c. 5,500 BCE, and a stone bayonet dated to c. 1,800 BCE. Significant quantities of fire-cracked rocks (indication of cooking activity) were found in test pits throughout the site. Test pits were only dug into the plow zone, so the possibility of even older artifacts exists. Notably for archaeological sites in the interior of Maine, no ceramic artifacts of any kind were found. This strongly suggests that the site was abandoned before c. 1,000 BCE. These types of sites are extremely rare in Maine, and provide a means to investigate shifting habitation patterns over time.

== See also ==
- National Register of Historic Places listings in Penobscot County, Maine
