= Bangor Children's Home =

- U.S. National Register of Historic Places
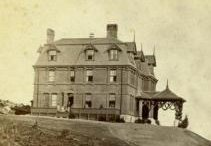
- The home, ca. 1870

- Location within Maine
- Location: 218 Ohio St., Bangor, Maine
- Coordinates: 44.8075°N 68.7812°W
- Area: 2 acres (0.81 ha)
- Built: 1868
- Architect: Henry W. Hartwell
- Architectural style: Stick/Eastlake
- NRHP reference No.: 75000103
- Added to NRHP: September 9, 1975

The Bangor Children's Home was an asylum for orphans at 218 Ohio Street in Bangor, Maine. Established in 1839 by the Maine Legislature as the Bangor Female Orphan Asylum, it served the community in that role until 1975, after which its facilities were converted into the Hilltop School and day-care center. Its main building, constructed in 1869, is one of the state's earliest examples of Stick style architecture, and an important early work of the architect Henry W. Hartwell. It was placed on the National Register of Historic Places in 1975.

== Description and history ==
The former Bangor Children's Home is located northwest of downtown Bangor, high on the east side of Thomas Hill, just below Summit Park. It is a three-story brick building, set on a granite foundation. It has a dormered mansard roof, which provides for a full third story. The dormers are gabled, with most housing one or two sash windows, although there is one with a Palladian window arrangement. All have applied Stick style elements at the gable ends. The main floors are separated by a projecting belt course of brick. The upper-level windows are set in segmented-arch openings, with flanking brickwork bracketed framing. The main entrance is sheltered by an elaborate porte-cochere with a shallow-pitch pyramidal roof.

The Bangor Female Orphan Asylum was established in 1839 by an act of the state legislature and was supported by the efforts of the local Union Female Education Society, founded in 1835. Originally housed in quarters in 4th Street, the present building was constructed in 1869, with funding support from a bequest by Franklin Pitcher. It was designed by Henry W. Hartwell, then early in his career, and is believed to be one of the first examples of the state of Stick style decoration. The land was donated by James Smith, Jr., and an adjoining parcel was donated by Samuel Prentiss in 1914, for use as a playground. At Pitcher's demand, the facility's purpose was broadened to include boys, and the organization was rechartered and renamed in 1866 as the Bangor Children's Home. By the 1970s, funding and treatment models had changed, and the boarding services were no longer needed.

Bangor Children's Home is doing business as Hilltop School today. It has been a daycare/preschool since 1975.

== See also ==
- National Register of Historic Places listings in Penobscot County, Maine
