= Blake House (Bangor, Maine) =

Historic house in Maine, United States

- U.S. National Register of Historic Places
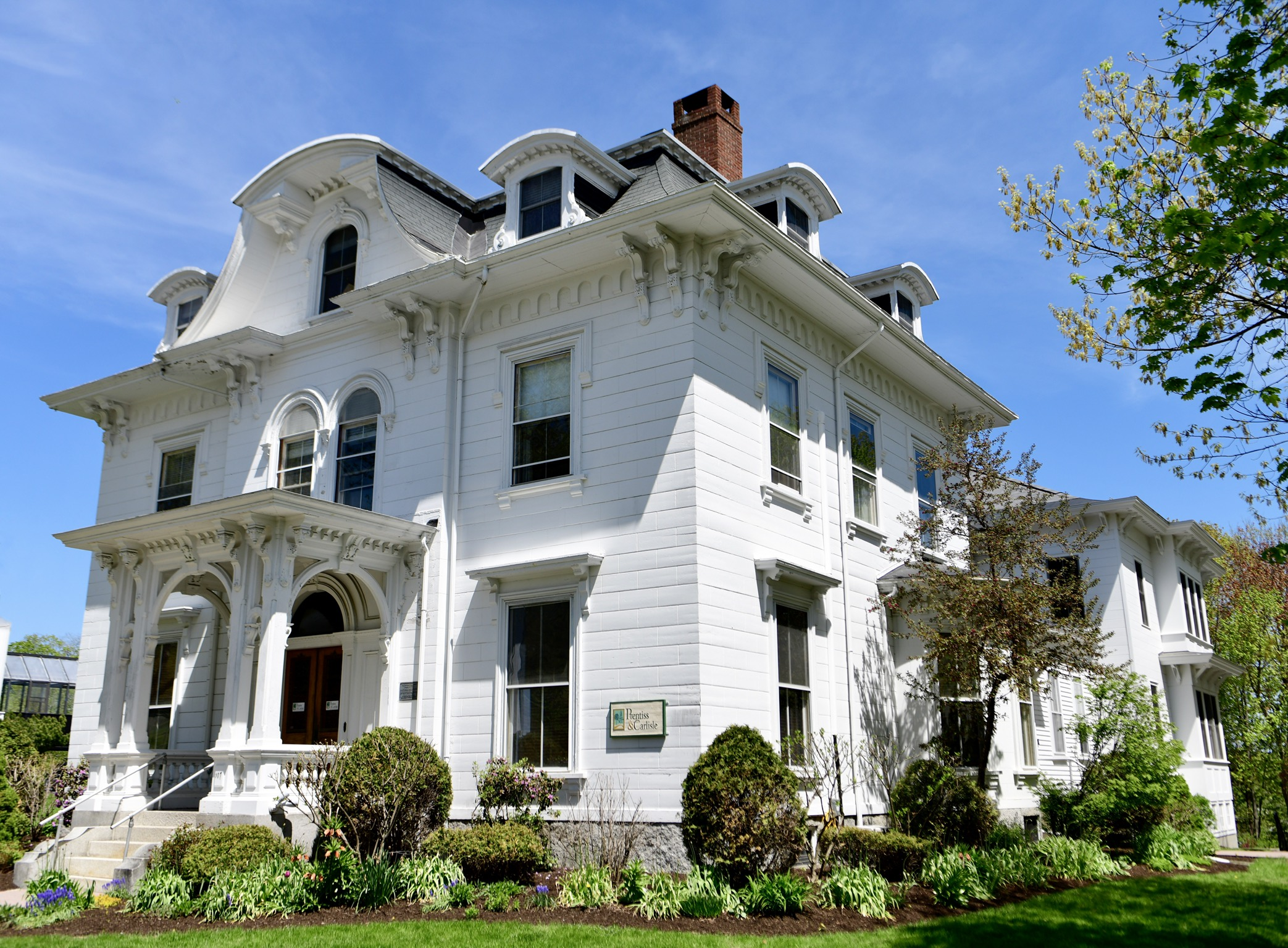

- Location within Maine Location within the United States
- Location: 107 Court Street; Bangor, Maine
- Coordinates: 44.8040°N 68.77693°W
- Area: less than one acre
- Built: 1858
- Architect: Ryder & Fuller
- Architectural style: Second Empire
- NRHP reference No.: 72000077
- Added to NRHP: October 31, 1972

The Blake House (also known as Prentiss & Carlisle, Inc.) is a historic house at 107 Court Street in Bangor, Maine. Built in 1858 to a design by local architect Calvin Ryder, it is one of the first Second Empire houses to be built in the state of Maine. It was listed on the National Register of Historic Places on October 31, 1972.

== Description and history ==
The house is located in a residential area northwest of downtown Bangor, on the northeast side of Court Street opposite Boynton Street, and next door to the historic Samuel Farrar House. It is a 2 1/2-story wood-framed structure, with a flared mansard roof, and a flushboarded exterior that has been scored and treated to resemble stone. The roof is pierced by a dormers, most of which have segmented-arch tops. The center section of the three-bay front facade projects slightly, and is topped by a large dormer with a round-arch window at its center. The entrance is sheltered by an ornately decorated porch with square posts and a bracketed and dentillated cornice. First floor sash windows are topped by bracketed cornices, while second floor windows are framed by eared hoods.

It was built in 1858 for William Blake, a wealthy Bangor merchant, by his brother-in-law, Boston architect Calvin Ryder. It is probably one of the first buildings of the Second Empire style built in the state, and typifies the high-style houses built for Bangor's elite in the years before the American Civil War. The house now houses professional offices.

== See also ==
- National Register of Historic Places listings in Penobscot County, Maine
