= Charles W. Jenkins House =

Historic house in Maine, United States

- U.S. National Register of Historic Places
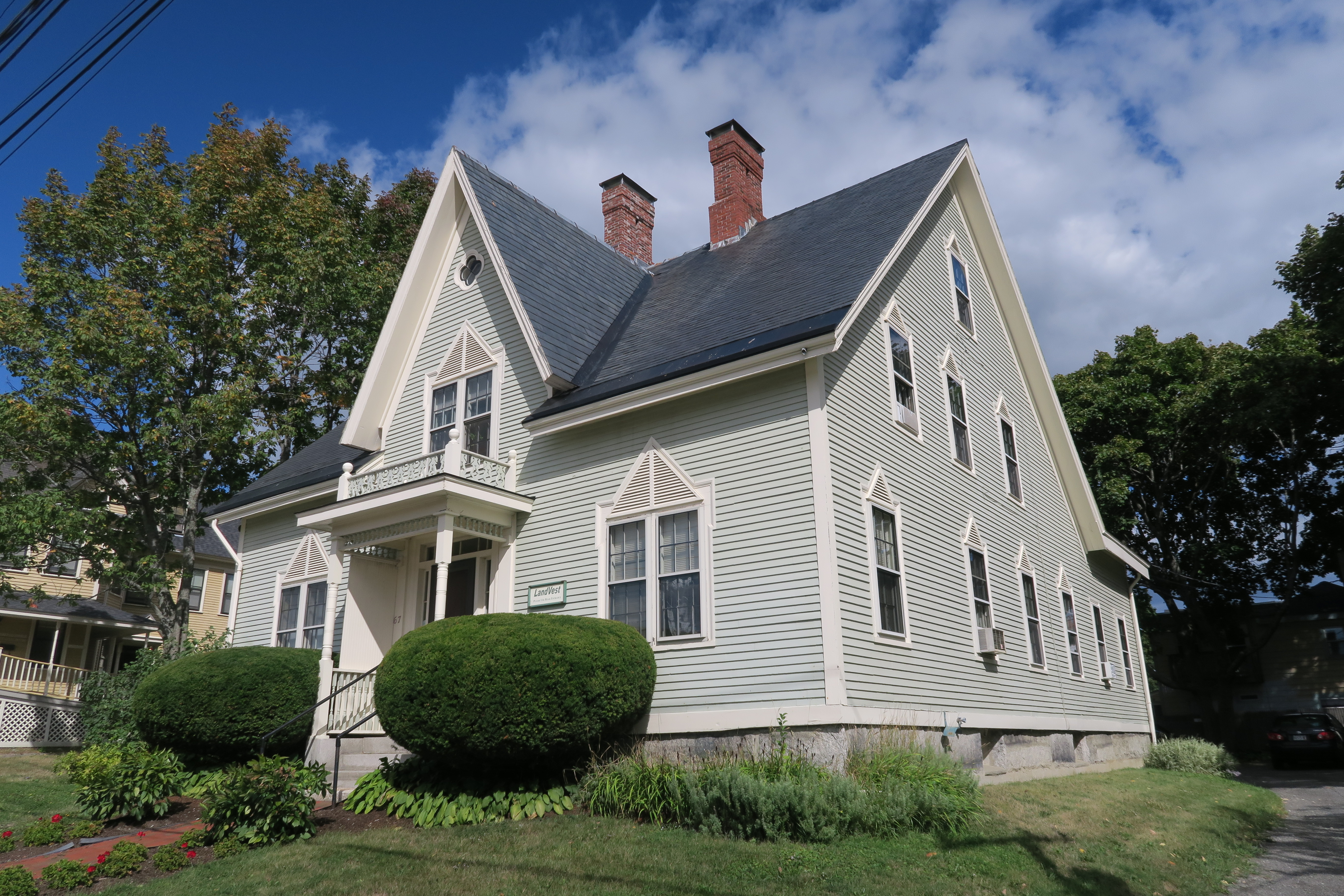
- Charles W. Jenkins House

- Location within Maine Location within the United States
- Location: 67 Pine St., Bangor, Maine
- Coordinates: 44.8028°N 68.7661°W
- Area: less than one acre
- Built: 1845
- Architectural style: Gothic Revival
- NRHP reference No.: 90001469
- Added to NRHP: September 18, 1990

The Charles W. Jenkins House is a historic house at 67 Pine Street in Bangor, Maine. Built in 1845–46, it is a well-preserved example of a Gothic Revival cottage in an urban setting. The house was listed on the National Register of Historic Places in 1990.

== Description and history ==
The Jenkins House is set on the east side of Pine Street, just south of State Street in Bangor's downtown area. It is a 2 1/2-story wood-frame structure, roughly square in shape, with a peaked side-gable roof which has a full second story under it, and a front-facing steeply pitched gable. The main (west-facing) facade is three bays wide, with the center entrance sheltered by a portico that has turned posts, a spindled frieze, and a jigsawn balcony rail above. The flanking bays have paired sash windows framed by louvered triangles above and drip molding at the side. The sides of the house are five bays at the first floor, three at the second, and one at the attic level, all with single sash windows that have similar trim. The interior contains high-quality trim elements exhibiting a diversity of styles, including early Italianate surrounds, a Federal style staircase, and original Greek Revival chimney surrounds on the second floor.

The house was built in 1845-46 for Charles W. Jenkins, a Falmouth native who had married a Bangor woman. His choice of style and builders was probably influenced by relatives who were in the Episcopal church, which had recently built the Gothic Revival St. John's Episcopal Church. The house is a relatively free adaptation of the principles promoted by Andrew Jackson Downing in Cottage Residences.

== See also ==
- National Register of Historic Places listings in Penobscot County, Maine
