= Daniel Sargent House =

Historic house in Maine, United States

- U.S. National Register of Historic Places
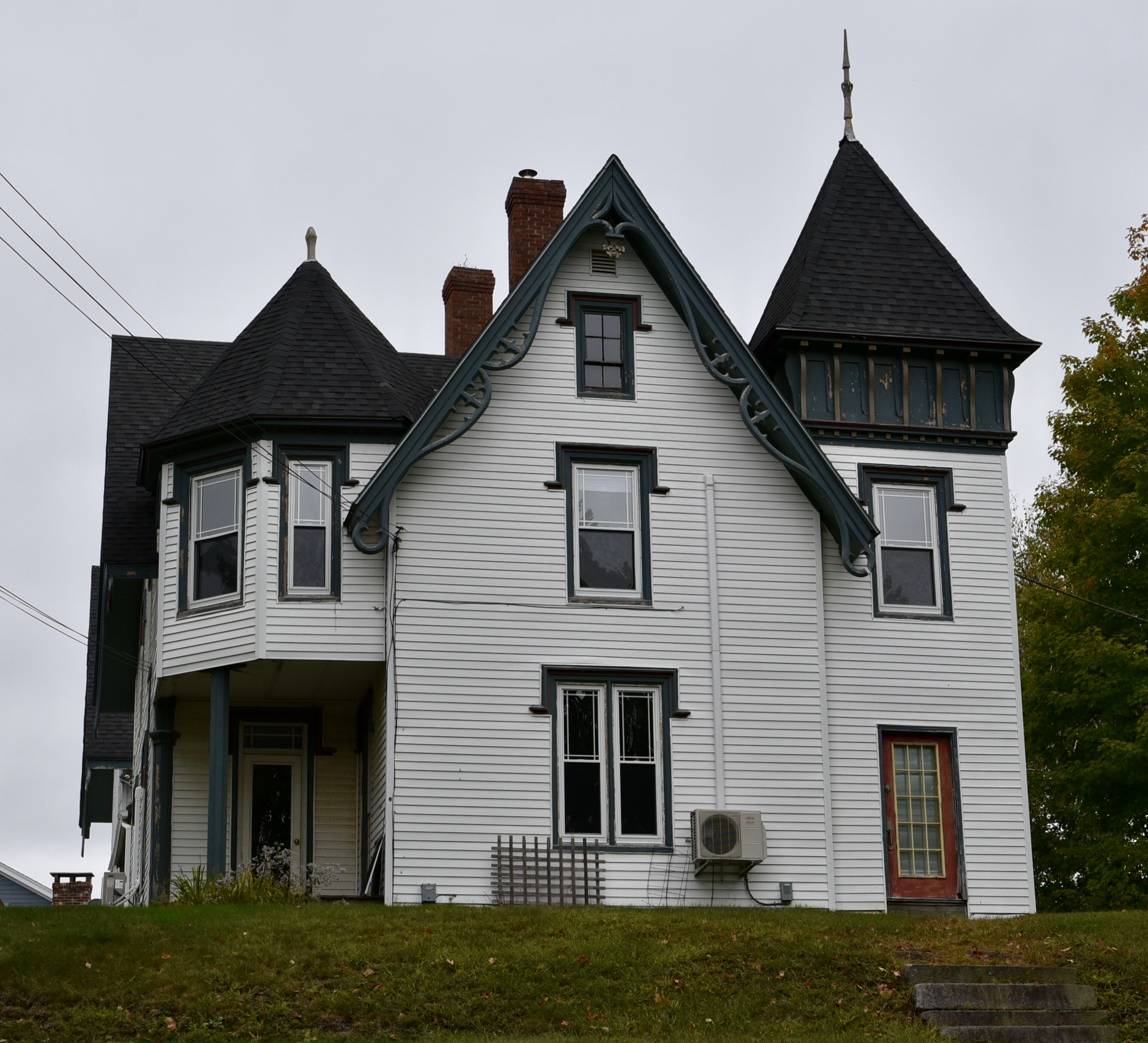

- Location within Maine Location within the United States
- Location: 613 S. Main St. Brewer, Maine
- Coordinates: 44°46′3″N 68°47′5″W
- Area: 1 acre (0.40 ha)
- Built: 1847
- Architectural style: Gothic, Gothic Revival
- NRHP reference No.: 82000425
- Added to NRHP: October 29, 1982

The Daniel Sargent House is a historic house at 613 South Main Street in Brewer, Maine. Built in 1847, it is one of Penobscot County's few examples of Gothic Revival architecture. The house was built by Daniel Sargent, one of the major lumber barons of the Penobscot area in the mid-19th century. The house was listed on the National Register of Historic Places in 1982.

== Description and history ==
The Sargent House stands at the southwest corner of South Main Street (Maine State Route 15) and Town Landing Road in far southwestern Brewer. It is a large 2 1/2-story wood-frame structure, with a main roof line running east–west and cruciform gables (two south, one north) projecting from each side. The gable ends are all decorated with a distinctive vine-like vergeboard. A square tower rises at the northeast corner of the eastern and northern gables, capped by a steeply pitched pyramidal roof with a finial at the top. A lower octagonal turret stands at the southeast corner. A single-story porch, now enclosed, stands between the southern gables.

The house was built in 1847 by Daniel Sargent, owner of a shipyard and lumber mill. Sargent was one of the area's preeminent "lumber barons", whose business dominated the Brewer-Bangor area. The house is a high quality and relatively little-altered example of the Gothic Revival, of which only three examples are known in the county. The alterations include the removal of a porch front the front (which was similar in style to that on the south side), and the addition of the square tower, probably in the 1880s or 1890s.

== See also ==
- National Register of Historic Places listings in Penobscot County, Maine
