= Wardwell-Trickey Double House =

Historic house in Maine, United States

- U.S. National Register of Historic Places
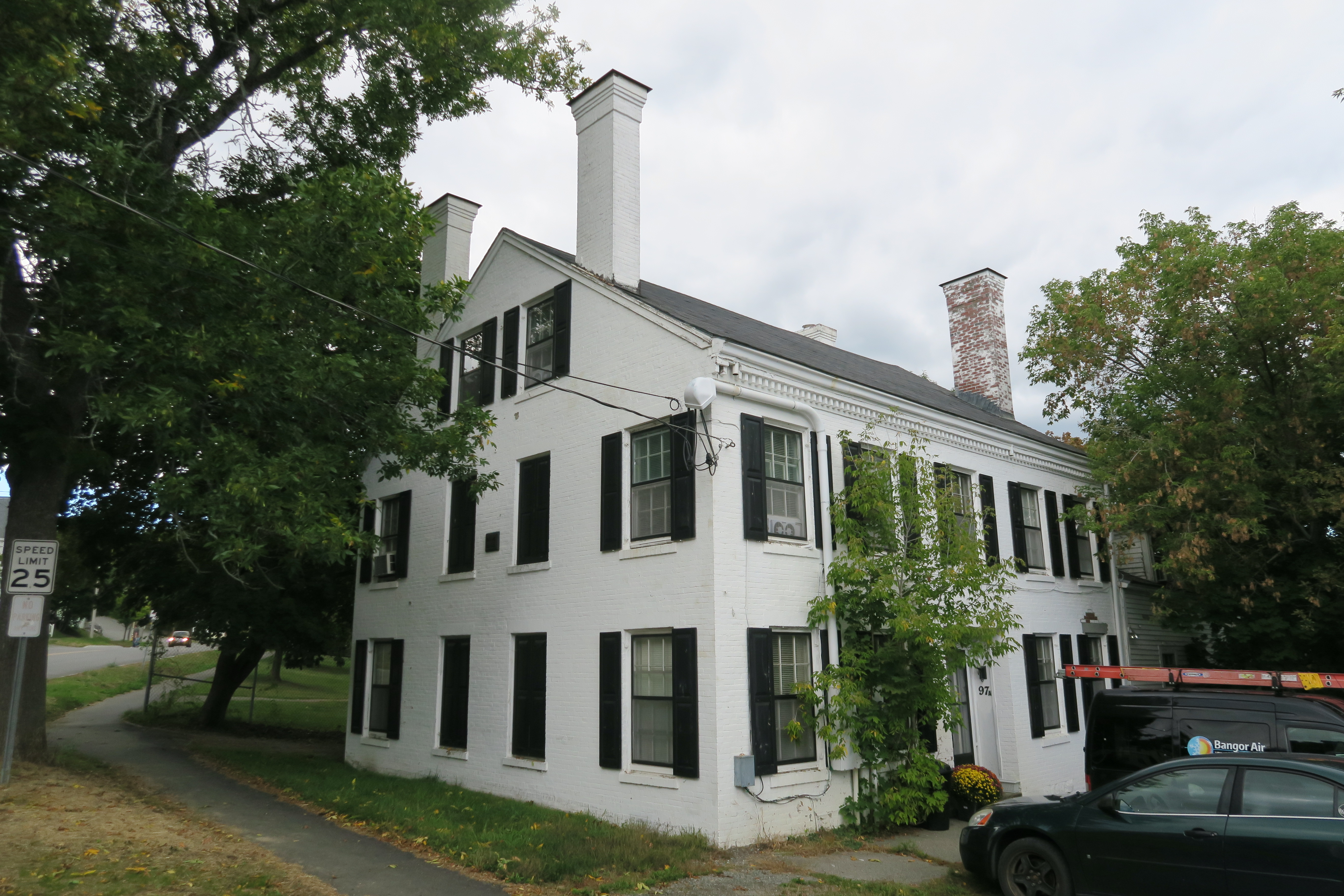
- Wardwell-Trickey Double House

- Location within Maine Location within the United States
- Location: 97-99 Ohio St., Bangor, Maine
- Coordinates: 44°48′12″N 68°46′47″W
- Area: less than one acre
- Built: 1836
- Architect: Oren Wardwell, Daniel Trickey
- Architectural style: Greek Revival
- NRHP reference No.: 92000795
- Added to NRHP: June 18, 1992

The Wardwell-Trickey Double House is a historic two-family residence at 97-99 Ohio Street in Bangor, Maine. Built in 1836, it is one of the least-altered early duplex brick houses in the city, in a form that were rarely seen in the state outside Bangor. The house was listed on the National Register of Historic Places in 1992.

== Description and history ==
The Wardwell-Tricky House is located on the north side of Ohio Street, just east of Coe Park, and a short way northwest of Bangor's central business district. It is a 2 1/2-story brick structure, with a gable end facing the street to the south. The house is divided longitudinally along its gable ridge into two units, and presents two five-bay fronts to the east and west. A 1 1/2-story wood-frame addition extends to the north, continuing this division. Each unit has two chimneys at the ends of the main block, and a third in the ell. The entrances are set in recessed openings at the centers of the facades, and appear to be early 20th-century Colonial Revival replacements. The interiors of both units have retained a significant amount of original woodwork and hardware, including plasterwork, Greek Revival doors, stair rails, and newel posts.

The house was built in 1836 by two masons, Oren Wardwell and Daniel Trickey. The style of the house, with the division along the gable, is apparently a peculiarity of Bangor, and was most frequently repeated in wood-frame construction. This house is among the best-preserved of those that survive from the first half of the 19th century, especially its interiors.

== See also ==
- National Register of Historic Places listings in Penobscot County, Maine
