= Maine State Route 168 =

State highway in Penobscot County, Maine, US

State Route 168
- Winn Road

Route information
- Maintained by MaineDOT
- Length: 10.19 mi (16.40 km)
- Existed: 1925–present

Major junctions
- South end: SR 6 in Lee
- North end: US 2 in Winn

Location
- Country: United States
- State: Maine
- Counties: Penobscot

Highway system
- Maine State Highway System; Interstate; US; State; Auto trails; Lettered highways
← SR 167	→ SR 169

State Route 168 (SR 168) is part of Maine's system of numbered state highways. It runs 10.2 miles (16.4 km) from an intersection with SR 6 in the town of Lee to U.S. Route 2 in Winn. It is known as Winn Road for its entire length.

== Major junctions ==
The entire route is in Penobscot County.

Location	mi	km	Destinations	Notes
Lee	0.00	0.00	SR 6 (Lee Road) / Arab Road – Springfield, Topsfield, Lincoln	
Winn	10.19	16.40	US 2 / Lee Street	
1.000 mi = 1.609 km; 1.000 km = 0.621 mi
