= List of Grange Hall buildings =

Notable Grange Hall buildings are or were meeting places of The National Grange of the Order of Patrons of Husbandry and include buildings, such as the U.S. National Historic Landmark Oliver H. Kelley Homestead, which were otherwise strongly associated with the Grange movement. There are over 60 such buildings which are historic and are listed on the U.S. National Register of Historic Places (NRHP). More complete lists of Grange buildings, historic or otherwise, in any particular area, can be derived using the National Grange's Find a Grange page.

For one state, "in 1870, the Vermont State Grange was organized at the Union Schoolhouse in St. Johnsbury. By 1872 there were twelve subordinate granges throughout the State. Like early farmers' clubs and societies, grange meetings were often held in public buildings dedicated to other uses such as schools, church vestries and town halls. It was not until the 1890s, a time when the Grange was becoming politically active for the first time and experiencing a rapid growth in membership, that local granges began to build their own buildings."

in the United States

(by state, then city or town)

	Building	Image	Dates	Location	City, state	Description
1	American River Grange Hall No. 172		1882 built 1996 NRHP-listed	38°36′3″N 121°16′28″W	near Rancho Cordova, California	Greek Revival architecture
2	Bennett Valley Grange Hall No. 16		1873		near Santa Rosa, California	
3	Pilot Hill Grange Hall No. 1		1889 built ? designated California Historic Landmark	On State Hwy 49 (P.M. 31.3), 0.2 mi N of Pilot Hill, California; 38°50′38.12″N 121°0′53.94″W	Cool, California	First Grange Hall in California, established 1870, building built 1889. The site is California Historical Landmark number 552.
4	Boulder Valley Grange No. 131		1900 built 1987 NRHP-listed	3400 N. 95th St. 40°2′13″N 105°7′48″W	Lafayette, Colorado	NRHP-listed
5	Pike's Peak Grange No. 163		1909 built 1990 NRHP-listed	3093 N. State Hwy 83; 39°24′32″N 104°45′42″W	Franktown, Colorado	Late 19th and Early 20th Century American Movements architecture, Vernacular wood frame
6	Greenfield Hill Grange No. 133		1897 built 2008 NRHP-listed	1873 Hillside Rd. 41°11′3″N 73°17′38″W	Fairfield, Connecticut	Queen Anne style architecture
7	Wallingford Grange No. 33		1933 built	586 Center St.	Wallingford, Connecticut	
8	Grange Hall (Wilton, Connecticut)		1899 built		Wilton, Connecticut	Possibly included in Cannondale Historic District?
9	Elm Grange		1840 built 1985 NRHP-listed	39°29′56″N 75°38′56″W	near Odessa, Delaware	Greek Revival architecture, Italianate architecture, Federal architecture
10	Cochran Grange		1842 built 1973 NRHP-listed	39°26′35″N 75°44′11″W	Middletown, Delaware	Greek Revival architecture, Italianate architecture, Georgian architecture
11	Wood River Center Grange No. 87		1914 built 2003 NRHP-listed	43°0′12″N 114°28′43″W	in or near Shoshone, Idaho	NRHP-listed
12	Grange Hall (Murphysboro, Illinois)		1912 built 1990 NRHP-listed	37°49′10″N 89°19′19″W	Murphysboro, Illinois	Early Commercial architecture
13	Vinland Grange Hall		1884 built 2000 NRHP-listed	Jct. of Oak and Main Sts. 38°50′21″N 95°10′56″W	Vinland, Kansas	Gable front design
14	Church Hill Grange Hall		1878 built 1975 NRHP-listed	36°47′58″N 87°34′28″W	Hopkinsville, Kentucky	NRHP-listed
15	Benton Grange No. 458		1915 built 2004 NRHP-listed	Jct. of River Rd. and School Dr. 44°35′21″N 69°35′6″W	Benton, Maine	Colonial Revival architecture
16	Grange Hall (Eddington, Maine)		1879 built 2004 NRHP-listed	Airline Rd., 0.4 mi W of junction of ME 46 S 44°47′32″N 68°35′11″W	Eddington, Maine	Italianate architecture; also known as East Eddington Public Hall or Comins Hall
17	Garland Grange Hall		1891 built 1975 NRHP-listed	Off ME 94; 45°2′27″N 69°9′38″W	Garland, Maine	Greek Revival architecture, Italianate architecture
18	Lakeside Grange No. 63		1905 built 2005 NRHP-listed	Main St., jct. of Main St. and Lincoln St. 44°6′37″N 70°40′54″W	Harrison, Maine	Colonial Revival architecture
19	Lee Forest Grange		1840 built 1990 NRHP-listed	Main St. E of ME 168; 45°21′36″N 68°17′10″W	Lee, Maine	Greek Revival; also known as "Abial Cushman Store"
20	Tranquility Grange No. 344		1908 built 2002 NRHP-listed	1 mi. N. of jct. ME 52 and ME 173; 44°18′21″N 69°5′52″W	Lincolnville, Maine	Bungalow/Craftsman architecture
21	Machias Valley Grange, No. 360, former,		1907 built 2007 NRHP-listed	3 Elm St. 44°42′47″N 67°27′27″W	Machias, Maine	Queen Anne style architecture
22	Wonder Grange		1874 built 1977 NRHP-listed	Off ME 11; 45°36′20″N 68°31′39″W	Medway, Maine	Also known as Congregational Church of Medway; NRHP-listed
23	Monticello Grange No. 338		1922 built 2000 NRHP-listed	Main St., 0.7 mi. S of jct. with Muckatee Rd. 46°18′26″N 67°50′29″W	Monticello, Maine	Late Victorian architecture
24	Somerset Grange No. 18		1866 built 1988 NRHP-listed	Jct. of Main St. and Mercer Rd. 44°42′48″N 69°47′55″W	Norridgewock, Maine	Second Empire architecture; also known as "Eaton School"
25	Anson Grange No. 88		1849 built 2004 NRHP-listed	10 Elm St. 44°51′16″N 69°53′55″W	North Anson, Maine	Greek Revival architecture
26	North Jay Grange Store		1895 built 1974 NRHP-listed	ME 17; 44°33′15″N 70°14′9″W	Jay, Maine	NRHP-listed
27	Oakfield Grange, No. 414		1906 built 2006 NRHP-listed	89 Ridge Rd. 46°5′54″N 68°9′5″W	Oakfield, Maine	Late 19th and 20th Century Revivals architecture
28	Enterprise Grange, No. 173		1884 built 2008 NRHP-listed	446 Dow Rd. 44°43′14″N 68°47′20″W	Orrington, Maine	Italianate architecture
29	Upton Grange No. 404 (Former),		1899 built 2000 NRHP-listed	Jct. of ME 26 and Mill Rd. 44°41′40″N 71°0′43″W	Upton, Maine	NRHP-listed
30	Pleasant River Grange No. 492		1909 built 1999 NRHP-listed	44°4′33″N 68°50′20″W	Vinalhaven, Maine vicinity	NRHP-listed
31	Dalton Grange Hall No. 23		1879 built 1983 NRHP-listed	42°27′38″N 73°10′58″W	Dalton, Massachusetts	Late Victorian architecture, Other
32	Foxboro Grange Hall	Foxboro Grange	1897 built 1983 NRHP-listed	42°3′56″N 71°15′2″W	Foxborough, Massachusetts	Late Victorian architecture
33	Guiding Star Grange		? built		Greenfield, Massachusetts	First grange organized in Massachusetts, in 1873
34	Third Meetinghouse	Third Meetinghouse	1816 built 1976 NRHP-listed	1 Fairhaven Rd. 41°39′43″N 70°49′13″W	Mattapoisett, Massachusetts	Italianate architecture
35	Norfolk Grange Hall		1863 built 1989 NRHP-listed	28 Rockwood Rd. 42°7′20″N 71°19′58″W	Norfolk, Massachusetts	Italianate architecture, Georgian architecture Was built as a Baptist church; is still used as a Grange Hall now.
36	West Stockbridge Grange No. 246	West Stockbridge Grange No. 246	1838 built 1999 NRHP-listed	42°20′9″N 73°22′7″W	West Stockbridge, Massachusetts	Greek Revival architecture
37	Grange Hall (West Tisbury, Massachusetts)		1859 built	41°22′48.89″N 70°40′31.01″W	West Tisbury, Massachusetts	A historic building preserved by the Martha's Vineyard Preservation Trust
38	Atlas Grange Hall		? built 1982 NRHP-listed	8530 Perry Rd. 42°58′5″N 83°33′13″W	Atlas Township, Michigan	"New-England" architecture; NRHP-listed
39	Minnehaha Grange Hall	Minnehaha Grange	1879 built 1970 NRHP-listed	4918 Eden Ave. 44°54′38.5″N 93°20′58″W	Edina, Minnesota	NRHP-listed
40	Oliver H. Kelley Homestead	Oliver Kelley Homestead	1850 built 1964 NHL; 1966 NRHP-listed	2.5 mi. SE of downtown Elk River, Minnesota on U.S. Highway 10; 45°15′35″N 93°32′12″W	Elk River, Minnesota	U.S. National Historic Landmark. Home of one of the Grange founders.
41	Bear Valley Grange Hall	Bear Valley Grange Hall	1874 built 1989 NRHP-listed	44°18′51″N 92°27′56″W	in or near Zumbro Falls, Minnesota	Front gabled
42	Crescent Grange Hall No. 512		1881 built 1979 NRHP-listed	45°23′0″N 93°5′58″W	East Bethel, Minnesota	NRHP-listed
43	Rackett Grange Hall No. 318		1926 built 2001 NRHP-listed	41°39′53″N 102°12′16″W	Lewellen, Nebraska	NRHP-listed
44	Grasmere Schoolhouse No. 9 and Town Hall		1889 built 1900 NRHP-listed	86 Center Street; 43°1′19″N 71°32′42″W	Goffstown, New Hampshire	Also known as the Grasmere Grange Hall, in the village of Grasmere.
45	Lower Intervale Grange No. 321	1912 built 2022 NRHP-listed	471 Daniel Webster Hwy.	Plymouth, New Hampshire	Little changed.	
46	Jeremiah Smith Grange No. 161		1891 est. 2009 NHSRHP-listed	1 Lee Hook Road; 43.12166°N 71.01129°W	Lee, New Hampshire	Building had previously been a Baptist church.
47	Blow-Me-Down Grange		1839 built 2001 NRHP-listed	1071 NH 12-A; 43°32′1″N 72°21′24″W	Plainfield, New Hampshire	Greek Revival architecture
48	Lower Intervale Grange No. 321		1912 built 2022 NRHP-listed	471 Daniel Webster Hwy. 43.7237°N 71.6761°W	Plymouth, New Hampshire	No major modifications.
49	Golden Rod Grange No. 114		? built 1994 NRHP-listed	W side NH 32, 0.1 mi. S of jct. with Eaton Rd. 42°52′20″N 72°16′57″W	Swanzey, New Hampshire	NRHP-listed
50	Andy's Summer Playhouse		1860 built	42°49′52″N 71°46′35″W; 582 Isaac Frye Hwy; Wilton, NH 03086	Wilton, New Hampshire	Building in use as Grange Hall from 1925-1967
51	Cold Spring Grange Hall	Old Grange	1912 built 1998 NRHP-listed	720 Seahore Road; 38°58′39″N 74°54′48″W	Lower Township, New Jersey	Colonial Revival architecture
52	Belmont Grange No. 1243		1860 built 2006 NRHP-listed	32 Willets Ave. 42°13′30″N 78°2′25″W	Belmont, New York	Italianate architecture, Queen Anne style architecture
53	South Bristol Grange Hall 1107		1923 built 1997 NRHP-listed	6457 NY 64; 42°42′28″N 77°22′50″W	Bristol Springs, New York	Late 19th and Early 20th Century American Movements architecture, vernacular
54	Chaumont Grange Hall and Dairymen's League Building		1898 built 1990 NRHP-listed	Main St. 44°3′55″N 76°7′44″W	Chaumont, New York	NRHP-listed
55	Upton Lake Grange Hall (former) 802	File:Creek Meeting House and Friends' Cemetery Nov 11.jpg	1777 built 1989 NRHP-listed	2424 Salt Point Turnpike. 41°49′53″N 73°45′43″W	Clinton Corners, New York	Colonial Fieldstone architecture. Quaker Creek Meeting Hall until 1927, Grange Hall until 1995
56	Copake Grange Hall		1902 built 2001 NRHP-listed	Empire Rd., S of Old Rte 22; 42°6′9″N 73°33′1″W	Copake, New York	NRHP-listed
57	Mountainville Grange Hall	Mountainville Grange Hall	1904 built 1996 NRHP-listed	41°24′1″N 74°4′46″W	Cornwall, New York	Colonial Revival architecture
58	Fly Creek Grange No. 844		1899 built 2004 NRHP-listed	208 Cemetery Rd. 42°43′0″N 74°59′2″W	Fly Creek, New York	NRHP-listed
59	Gifford Grange Hall		1866 built 1982 NRHP-listed	Western Tpk. 42°44′23″N 74°0′54″W	Guilderland, New York	NRHP-listed
60	Halcott Grange No. 881		1889 built 2000 NRHP-listed	Cty Rte. 3; 42°11′27″N 74°29′10″W	Halcott, New York	Queen Anne style architecture
61	Star Grange No. 9		1931 built 1989 NRHP-listed	Sulphur Springs Rd. between Jericho and Spencer Rds. 43°55′38″N 76°1′40″W	Hounsfield, New York	NRHP-listed
62	Thousand Island Grange Hall		1900 built 1996 NRHP-listed	E side of Gore Rd., N of jct. with NY 180, Hamlet of Omar; 44°15′40″N 75°58′20″W	Orleans, New York	NRHP-listed
63	Pleasant Valley Grange Hall		1830 built 1999 NRHP-listed	42°55′2″N 75°26′25″W	Pleasant Valley, New York	Greek Revival architecture
64	Putnam Valley Grange		c. 1900/1901 built	128 Mill Street (at Peekskill Hollow Rd) 41°21′11.8908″N 73°50′21.48″W	Putnam Valley, New York	Much of the building was destroyed by fire in the 1970s, but the structure was rebuilt by the membership.
65	Salisbury Center Grange Hall		1929 built 1999 NRHP-listed	2550 NY 29; 43°8′32″N 74°47′18″W	Salisbury Center, New York	NRHP-listed
66	Bethlehem Grange No. 137		1921 built 2002 NRHP-listed	24 Bridge St. 42°32′54″N 73°48′38″W	Selkirk, New York	NRHP-listed
67	Borodino Hall	Borodino Hall	c. 1835 built 2006 NRHP-listed	1861 East Lake Road; 42°51′31″N 76°20′20″W	Skaneateles, New York	Federal architecture
68	Niskayuna Grange Hall No. 1542		c. 1850 built 2010 NRHP-listed	2572 Rosendale Rd. 42°47′46″N 73°51′31″W	Niskayuna, New York	Built as a schoolhouse and used as Grange since 1948
69	Smithville Valley Grange No. 1397		1842 built 1998 NRHP-listed	NY 41; 42°23′57″N 75°48′33″W	Smithville Flats, New York	Greek Revival architecture
70	Walton Grange No. 1454		1886 built 1998 NRHP-listed	57 Stockton Ave. 42°9′56″N 75°7′50″W	Walton, New York	It was formerly the Walton Armory.
71	Hebron Valley Grange No. 1103		1839 built 2006 NRHP-listed	3185 Cty Rte 30; 43°13′50″N 73°22′34″W	West Hebron, New York	Greek Revival architecture
72	Corriher Grange Hall		1916 built 1982 NRHP-listed	35°36′4″N 80°41′43″W	near Enochville, North Carolina	It has served also as a school.
73	Scioto Grange No. 1234		? built 2005 NRHP-listed	255 Cove Rd. 39°0′49″N 82°44′52″W	Jackson, Ohio	The building has served as a meeting hall, as a school, and as a specialty store.
74	Griggs Grange No. 1467		1897 built 1995 NRHP-listed	41°47′19″N 80°42′47″W	near Jefferson, Ohio	NRHP-listed
75	Willakenzie Grange Hall		1913 built 2009 NRHP-listed	3055 Willakenzie Rd. 44°4′54.51″N 123°3′47.27″W	Eugene, Oregon	Bungalow/Craftsman architecture
76	Rogue River Valley Grange No. 469		1923 built 1992 NRHP-listed	2064 Upper River Rd. 42°26′26″N 123°21′4″W	Grants Pass, Oregon	Bungalow/Craftsman architecture
77	Lowell Grange		1940 built 2005 NRHP-listed	51 E 2nd St. 43°55′17″N 122°46′54″W	Lowell, Oregon	Bungalow/Craftsman architecture; has also served as a school
78	Eagle Grange No. 1	Eagle Grange No. 1	1877 built	41°10′44″N 76°54′40″W	Clinton Township, Lycoming County, Pennsylvania	The Grange hall was built in 1887.
79	Union Grange Hall		1897 built 1973 cp-NRHP-listed		Slatersville, Rhode Island	Built in 1897 as a chapel for the St. Luke's Episcopal Mission; included in the Slatersville Historic District
80	Donalds Grange No. 497		1935 built 1995 NRHP-listed	South Carolina Highway 184; 34°22′6″N 82°21′7″W	Donalds, South Carolina	NRHP-listed
81	Great Falls Grange Hall and Forestville School		1889 built 2004 NRHP-listed	9812 and 9818 Georgetown Pike; 38°59′58″N 77°17′10″W	Great Falls, Virginia	Bungalow/Craftsman architecture, Late 19th and 20th Century Revivals architecture
82	La Prairie Grange Hall No. 79		1874 built 1977 NRHP-listed	42°37′37″N 88°57′12″W	near La Prairie, Wisconsin	Italianate architecture; also serves as town hall
83	South Greenville Grange No. 225		1928 built 2018 NRHP-listed	W6920 Cty. Rd. BB; 44°14′38″N 88°32′18″W	Greenville, Wisconsin	Built by the South Greenville Grange members.
84	Waitsburg Grange No. 1			928 Preston Ave; 46.26987°N 118.14082°W	Waitsburg, Washington	Washington State's first Grange, organized 1873, 1st chapter chartered 1889
85	Victor Grange No. 322 @ Valentown Hall		1879 built 1997 NRHP-listed	267 High St. 44°14′38″N 88°32′18″W	Victor, New York	Built by Levi and Alanson Valentine in 1879, the landmark 4 story building is a rare example of 19th century architecture that has remained almost unaltered since its original construction. Today Valentown Hall is an intriguing Historical Museum.
86	Leon Grange No. 795		1903 built 2014 NRHP-listed	U.S. Route 62; 42.2940°N 79.0166°W	Leon, New York	NRHP-listed
87	Bedford Corners Grange		1886 built 2003 NRHP listed	NY 305; 42°3′14″N 78°18′38″W	Portville	NRHP-listed as part of the Bedford Corners Historic District
