= Grange Hall (disambiguation) =

Grange hall is a meeting place of fraternal organization The National Grange of the Order of Patrons of Husbandry in the United States.

- List of Grange Hall buildings, list of buildings of aforementioned meeting places

Grange Hall may also refer to:

== Buildings ==
- Grange Hall (Murphysboro, Illinois)
- Grange Hall (Wilton, Connecticut)
- Grange Hall (West Tisbury, Massachusetts)

== Places ==
- Grange Hall, Lake County, Illinois

== See also ==
- Granger Hall (disambiguation)
- Grange Hill (disambiguation)
