= Martha's Vineyard Film Festival =

Annual film festival on Martha's Vineyard

Martha's Vineyard Film Festival (MVFF) is an annual film festival held on the island of Martha's Vineyard in Massachusetts. Founded in 2001, it is produced by the nonprofit arts organization Circuit Arts. The festival takes place each March and includes year-round programming such as a summer film series, community screenings, and educational programs.

== History ==
The MVFF began in 2001 when founder Thomas Bena and a group of friends transformed the second floor of the historic Grange Hall into a makeshift screening space. Early screenings combined film, food, and community conversations, and the festival soon expanded into a major Island cultural event.

For many years, the winter festival was held at the Chilmark Community Center before returning to Grange Hall in 2022.

In 2025, MVFF celebrated its 25th anniversary with screenings at Grange Hall, the Capawock Theatre in Vineyard Haven, and the Martha's Vineyard Performing Arts Center in Oak Bluffs.

== Organization ==
The festival is produced by Circuit Arts, a nonprofit founded from the MVFF's growth and rebranding in 2022. Circuit Arts operates:

- the Martha's Vineyard Film Festival
- the Summer Film Series
- the Circuit Arts Drive-In
- Circuit Films, a production division
- children's theater and arts education programming

Circuit Arts runs year-round operations from Grange Hall, which contains a restored theater with couch seating and upgraded projection systems.

Most MVFF events follow a pay-what-you-can model with a $1 minimum ticket price.

== Venues ==
Primary venues include:

- Grange Hall, West Tisbury - home of Circuit Arts and the central festival venue
- Capawock Theatre, Vineyard Haven - used for special festival screenings
- Martha's Vineyard Performing Arts Center (MVPAC), Oak Bluffs - used for select feature screenings during anniversary years

== Winter Festival ==
The Winter Festival takes place each March. It includes documentary and narrative feature films, filmmaker Q&A sessions, food prepared by Island chefs, musical performances, and community discussions. Programming often highlights human-centered storytelling, social issues, and artistic innovation.

The 2025 festival presented approximately fifteen films, including premieres and youth-oriented selections.

== Summer Film Series ==
The MVFF Summer Film Series is held in July and August at Grange Hall. Past programming included a children's film-and-performance event called Cinema Circus, featuring films, live performers, and outdoor festivities. Contemporary programming focuses primarily on feature films and filmmaker conversations.

== Cinema Circus ==
Founded in 2009 under Lindsey Scott, Cinema Circus included short films for children along with performances by clowns, jugglers, musicians, stilt walkers, puppeteers, and other live entertainers. It was a core part of the Summer Film Series for many years.

== Year-Round Community Programs ==
Circuit Arts offers community film screenings, educational filmmaking workshops, children's arts programming, and collaborations with Island organizations. The MVFF has historically partnered with schools and youth groups to offer filmmaking classes.

== Leadership ==
The executive director of the Martha's Vineyard Film Festival is Brian Ditchfield. The Programming Director is Minah Oh, who oversees film curation and festival themes.

== Upcoming Festivals ==
The 26th annual Martha's Vineyard Film Festival is scheduled for March 25–29, 2026.
