= Grange Hill (disambiguation) =

Grange Hill is a British television children's drama series portraying life in a typical secondary school.

Grange Hill may also refer to:

== Places ==
- Grange Hill, Jamaica, a village
- Grangehill, a heritage-listed house in Brisbane, Queensland, Australia
- Grangehill, alternative name for The Kirna, a Ballantyne villa in Walkerburn, Scotland between 1903 and 1919

=== United Kingdom ===
- Grange Hill, County Durham, a village in County Durham
- Grange Hill, Essex, suburb in Chigwell in the Epping Forest district of Essex
  - Grange Hill tube station
- Grange Hill, North Ayrshire, Scotland

== Other ==
- Grange Hill (video game), a 1987 computer game by Argus Press Software for Commodore 64, ZX Spectrum and Amstrad CPC

== See also ==
- Grange Hall (disambiguation)
