= Great Falls Grange Hall and Forestville School =

Historic buildings in Virginia, US

- U.S. National Register of Historic Places
- Virginia Landmarks Register
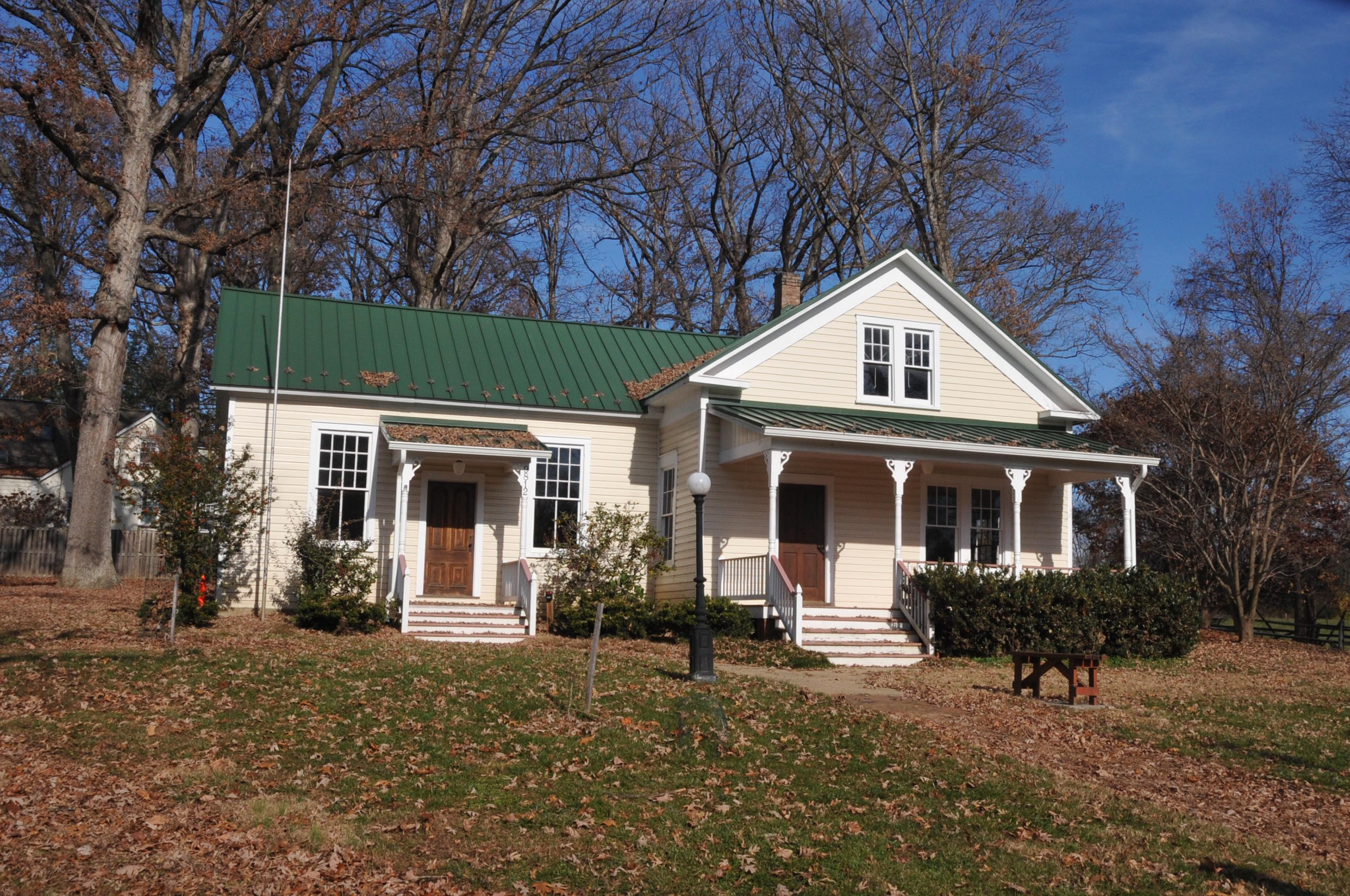
- Front view of the school building, in 2012

- Location within Northern Virginia Location within Virginia Location within the United States
- Location: 9812 and 9818 Georgetown Pike, Great Falls, Virginia
- Coordinates: 38°59′50″N 77°17′06″W
- Area: 9 acres (3.6 ha)
- Built: 1889, 1911, 1929
- Architect: Morris, L.B.
- Architectural style: Bungalow/Craftsman, Late 19th and 20th Century Revivals
- NRHP reference No.: 04000861
- VLR No.: 029-0441

Significant dates
- Added to NRHP: August 11, 2004
- Designated VLR: June 16, 2004

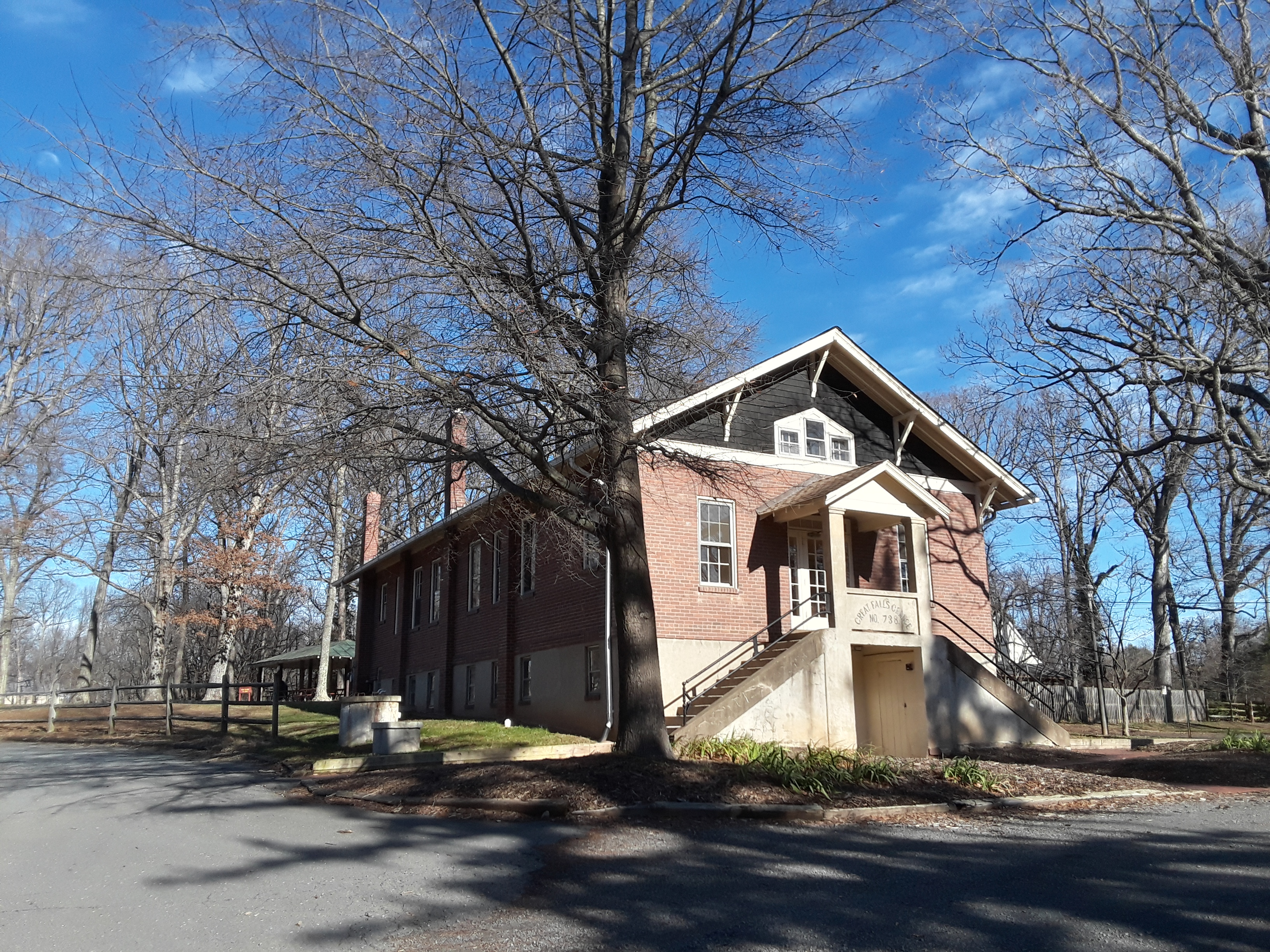
The former Grange Hall building, seen in 2018.

The Great Falls Grange Hall and Forestville School are two historic buildings that served as a Grange meeting hall and as a school located in Great Falls, Fairfax County, Virginia. The Forestville School was built in 1889 as a one-room school, and expanded in 1911 with the appendage of the Floris School. It is an L-shaped wood-frame structure covered in weatherboards and topped by a standing-seam metal cross-gable roof. After closing as a school in 1922, it served as a residence and then as the Great Falls Post Office from 1959 until 1982. The Great Falls Grange Hall was built in 1929, and is a 1 1/2-story brick building with a gable front. It features a front porch supported by concrete pillars in the American Craftsman style. Both buildings are owned by the Fairfax County Park Authority.

The buildings were listed on the National Register of Historic Places in 2004.

== See also ==
- List of Grange Hall buildings
