= Minnehaha Grange Hall =

- U.S. National Register of Historic Places
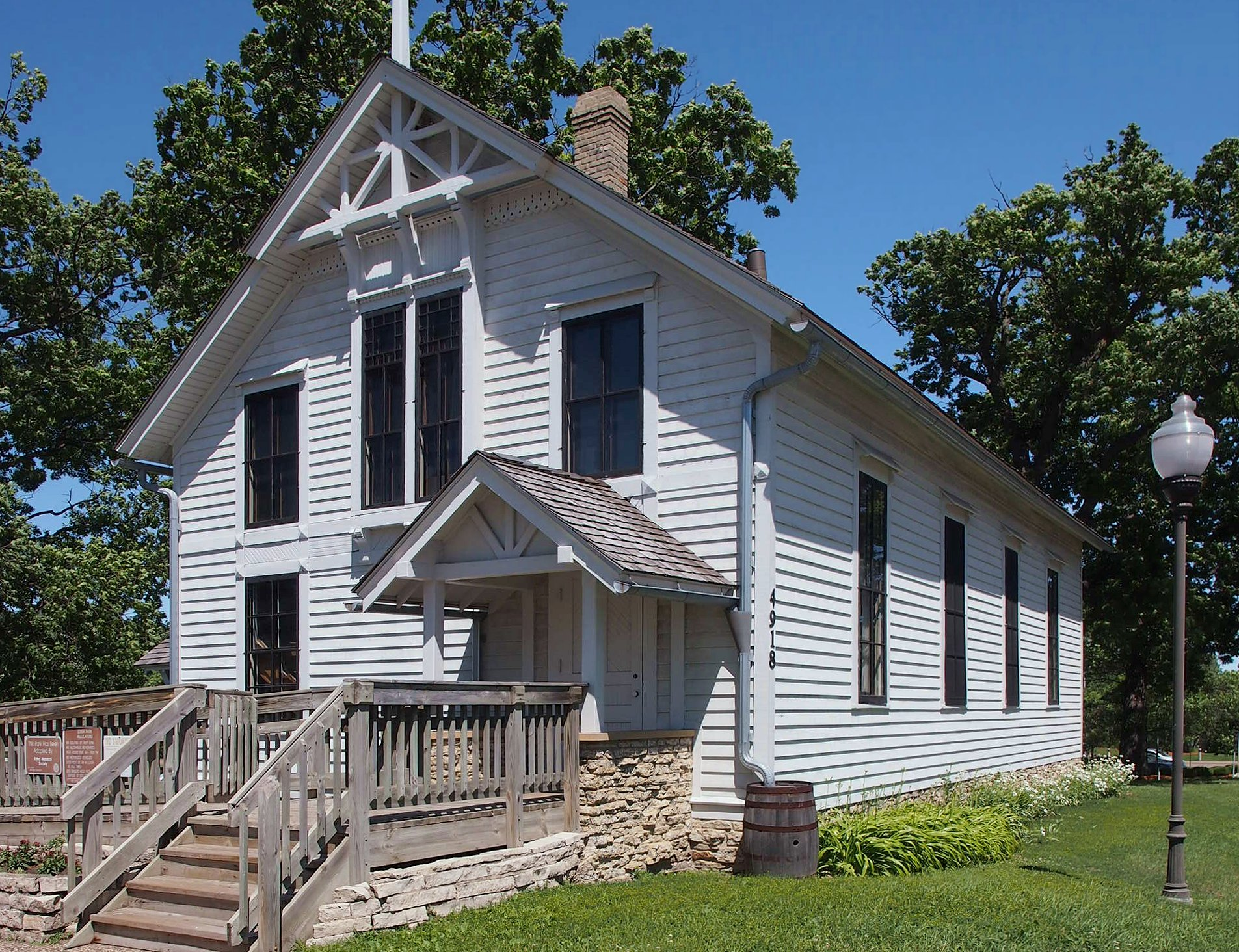
- The Minnehaha Grange Hall from the southwest

- Location within Minnesota Location within the United States
- Location: 4918 Eden Avenue, Edina, Minnesota
- Coordinates: 44°54′38.5″N 93°20′58″W
- Built: 1879
- NRHP reference No.: 70000914
- Added to NRHP: October 9, 1970

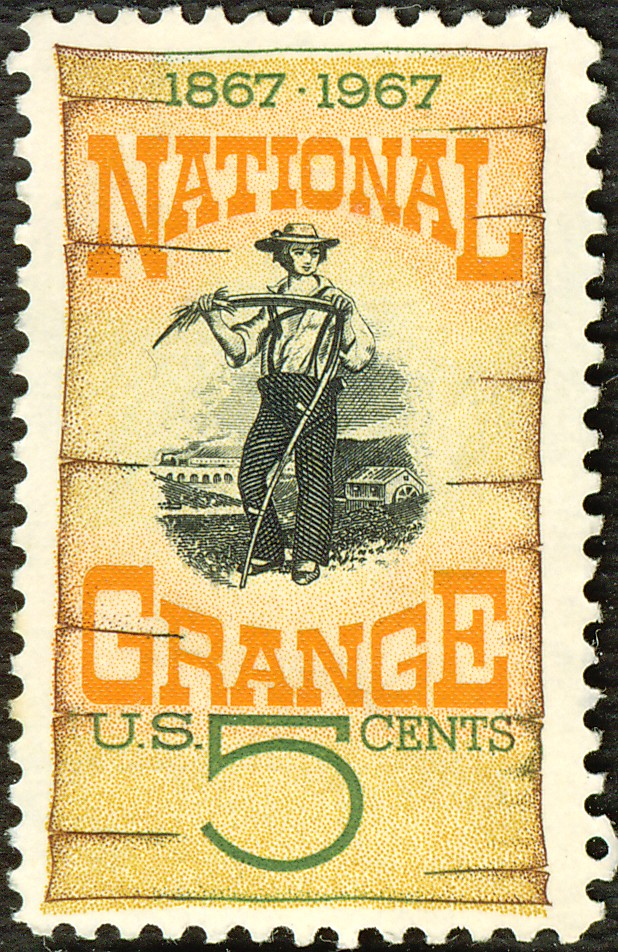
Grange postage stamp

Minnehaha Grange, No. 398 was organized on December 23, 1873, with members from Edina Mills, Richfield Mills, St. Louis Park, and Hopkins. The National Grange of the Order of Patrons of Husbandry, commonly known as the Grange, is an organization dedicated to the principles of "progressive agriculture" for the "social fraternity of the farmers". The organization was founded in 1867 by Oliver Hudson Kelley in Elk River, Sherburne County, Minnesota and quickly spread across the country. The fraternity tackled issues such as railroad prices, and providing education to farmers.

The Grange Hall was moved to Tupa Park near Minnesota State Highway 100 and Eden Avenue in Edina, Minnesota from its original location at the southeast corner of Wooddale Avenue and West 50th Street.

The building also served as Edina Village Hall from 1888 to 1942.

== See also ==
- List of Grange Hall buildings
- National Register of Historic Places listings in Hennepin County, Minnesota
