= Atlas Grange Hall =

- U.S. National Register of Historic Places
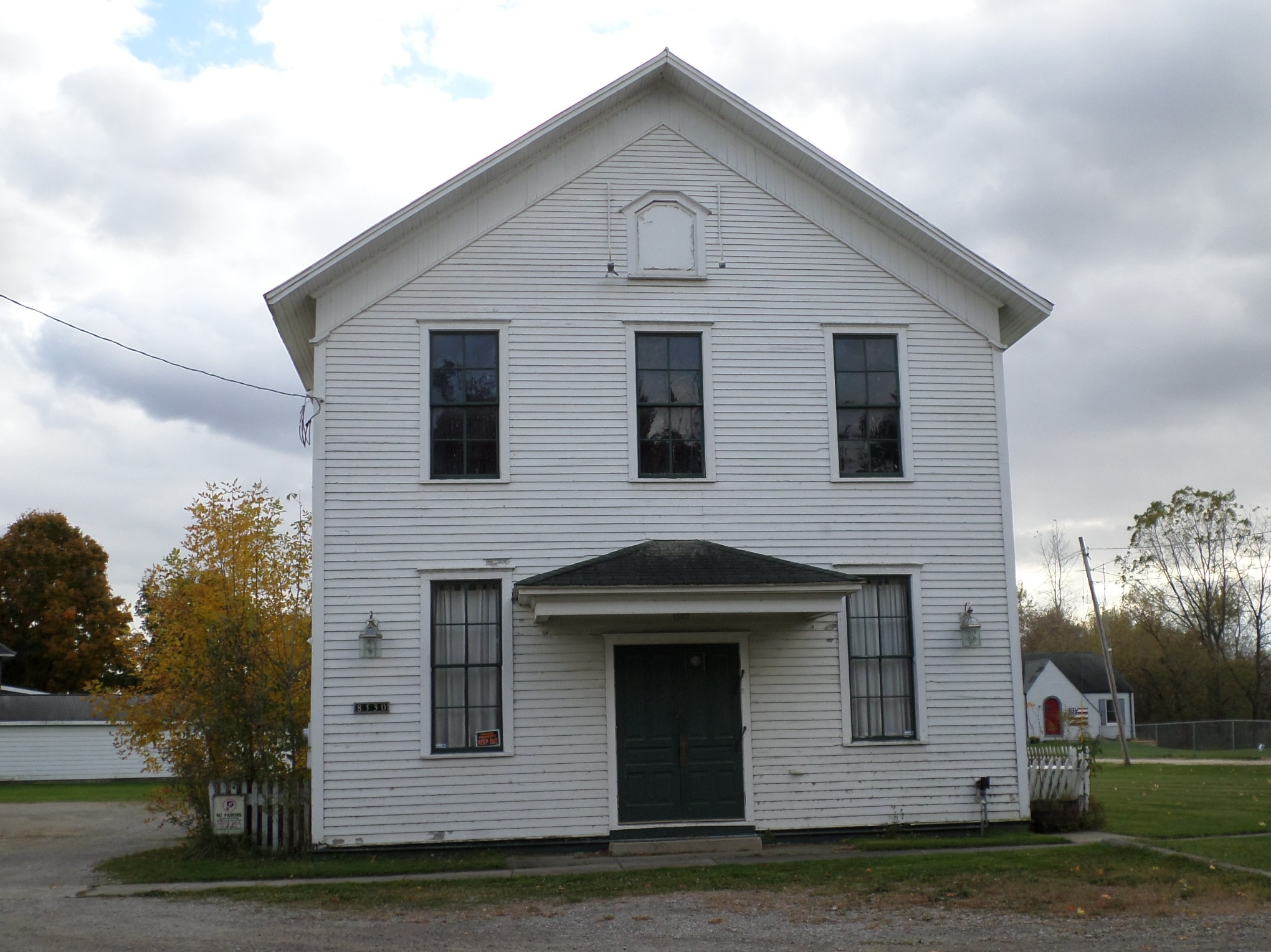
- The building in October 2015

- Location within Michigan Location within the United States
- Interactive map
- Location: 8530 Perry Rd., Atlas, Michigan
- Coordinates: 42°56′16″N 83°32′5″W
- Area: less than one acre
- Architectural style: New-England
- MPS: Genesee County MRA
- NRHP reference No.: 82000497
- Added to NRHP: November 26, 1982

The Atlas Grange Hall in Atlas, Michigan is a historic building located at 8530 Perry Road in Atlas, Michigan that served as a Grange Hall, as a Town Hall, and as a post office. It was listed on the National Register of Historic Places in 1982 as part of a group nomination of Genesee County properties.

== History ==
Atlas (then known as Davisonville) was founded in 1831 by Judge Norman Davison. A small settlement grew up at the location, evolving into a local market and agricultural processing center. Growth, however, was limited after 1873. This Grange Hall was built at some point in the nineteenth century; the exact date is not known. It served as a meeting place for the Knights of the Maccabees, an agricultural society. In later years, it was reportedly used as a town hall and post office.

The group nomination mentions that an Atlas Town Hall building has been converted into a library and community center, but that is a different building 2.8 miles (4.5 km) away within the Hegel Road Historic District.

== Description ==
The Atlas Grange Hall is a two-story, wood-framed structure with simple Classical detailing. It is rectangular, with a gable end facade three bays wide. The facade is symmetrical, with a double door entryway in the center and four-over-four double hung window units surrounding. At the top of the gable end is an unusually shaped, single pane window. The building is significant due to its similarity to the New England meeting house design.
