= Granger Hall =

Granger Hall may refer to:

- Granger Hall (basketball) (born 1962), American retired professional basketball player
- Granger Hall (National City, California), a historic building in National City, California, built in 1898 as an "acoustically perfect" music auditorium

== See also ==
- Grange Hall (disambiguation)
