= Frederick Wintle =

American politician

Frederick Ladd Wintle (born 1953) is a former Maine politician. A Republican, Wintle is a resident of Garland, Maine, and represented six towns and villages in Penobscot and Somerset Counties in the Maine House of Representatives.

== History ==
Wintle is a former member of the, United States Air Force and fought in both the Vietnam War and the Persian Gulf War.

== Criminal threatening ==
On May 21, 2011, Wintle was arrested for "pointing a handgun at a man at point-blank range in a Dunkin' Donuts parking lot". He allegedly began speaking with Michael G. Seamans, a photographer with the Morning Sentinel about the recent death of a toddler at a homeless shelter in Waterville and accused Seamans of being a drug dealer. He subsequently pulled out a .22 caliber weapon from his waist and pointed it at Seamans. Wintle was then arrested for criminal threatening.

Wintle was indicted on two felony charges in the Waterville incident, criminal threatening with a dangerous weapon and reckless conduct, and a misdemeanor charge of carrying a concealed weapon. The two former charges were dismissed in exchange for a guilty plea on the concealed weapons charge for which he was sentenced to a year in jail, serving 45 days with the rest suspended. Wintle stated, "I believe in America. I believe in God. I believe in my family, and I believe this is going to be all right," according to the Bangor Daily News.

In September 2011, Wintle resigned from the House of Representatives.
