= American River Grange Hall No. 172 =

- U.S. National Register of Historic Places
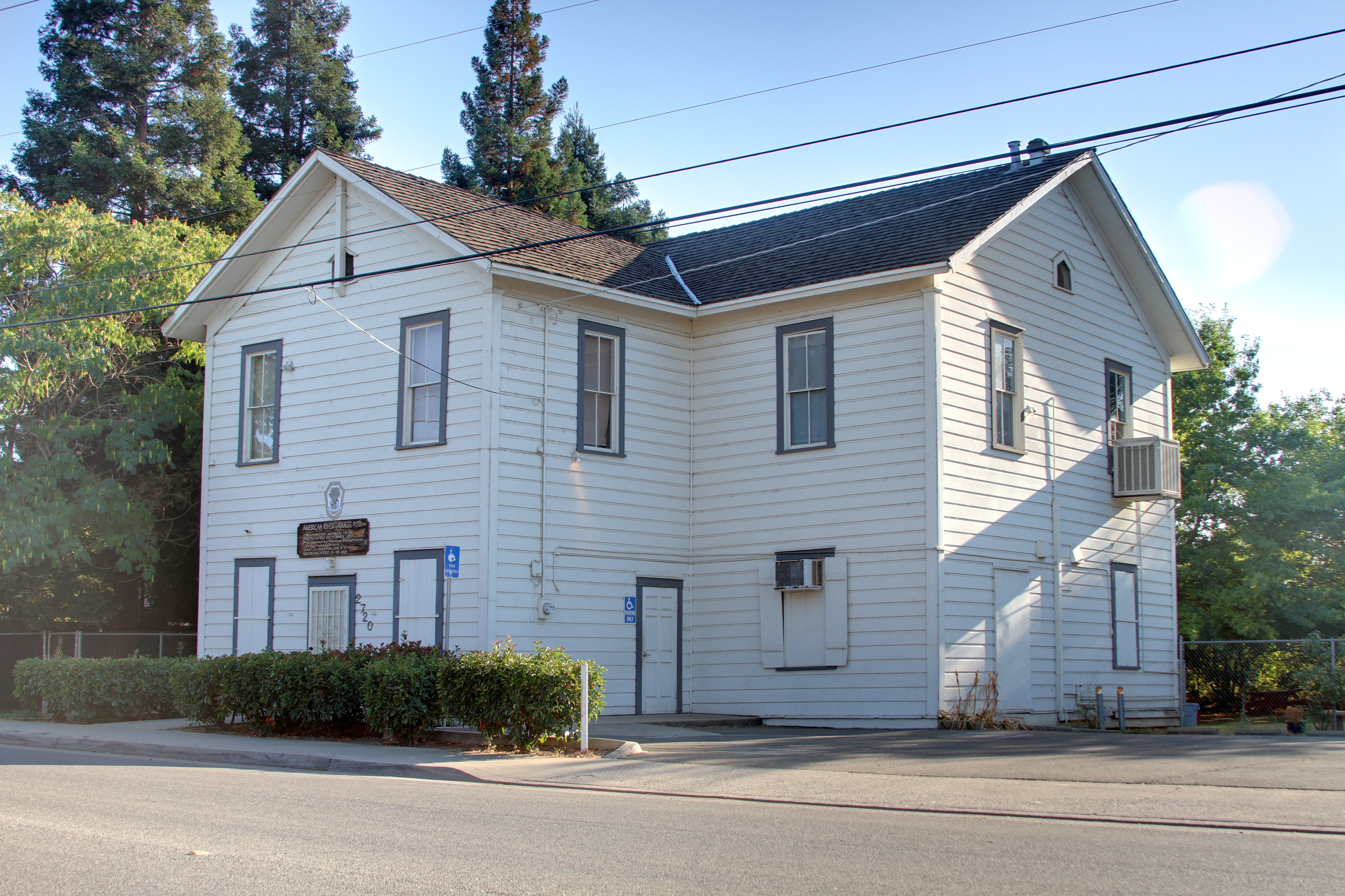

- Location within California Location within the United States
- Nearest city: Rancho Cordova, California
- Coordinates: 38°36′2.592″N 121°16′30.432″W
- Area: 0.8 acres (0.32 ha)
- Built: 1882
- Architect: Rodman, Mr.; Harvelson, Carl
- Architectural style: Victorian Greek Revival
- NRHP reference No.: 96001079
- Added to NRHP: October 10, 1996

The American River Grange Hall in Rancho Cordova, California, is an 1882 wooden Grange Hall building. The American River Grange was incorporated in January 1873 and met in Fifteen Mile House until having this building built.

As of 1996, the American River Grange Hall has been in continuous use ever since and is the oldest of eight Granges active in Sacramento County, California.

It was listed on the National Register of Historic Places in 1996.

== See also ==
- California Historical Landmarks in Sacramento County, California
- The National Grange of the Order of Patrons of Husbandry
- National Register of Historic Places listings in Sacramento County, California
