= Lakeside Grange No. 63 =

- Lakeside Grange #63
- U.S. National Register of Historic Places
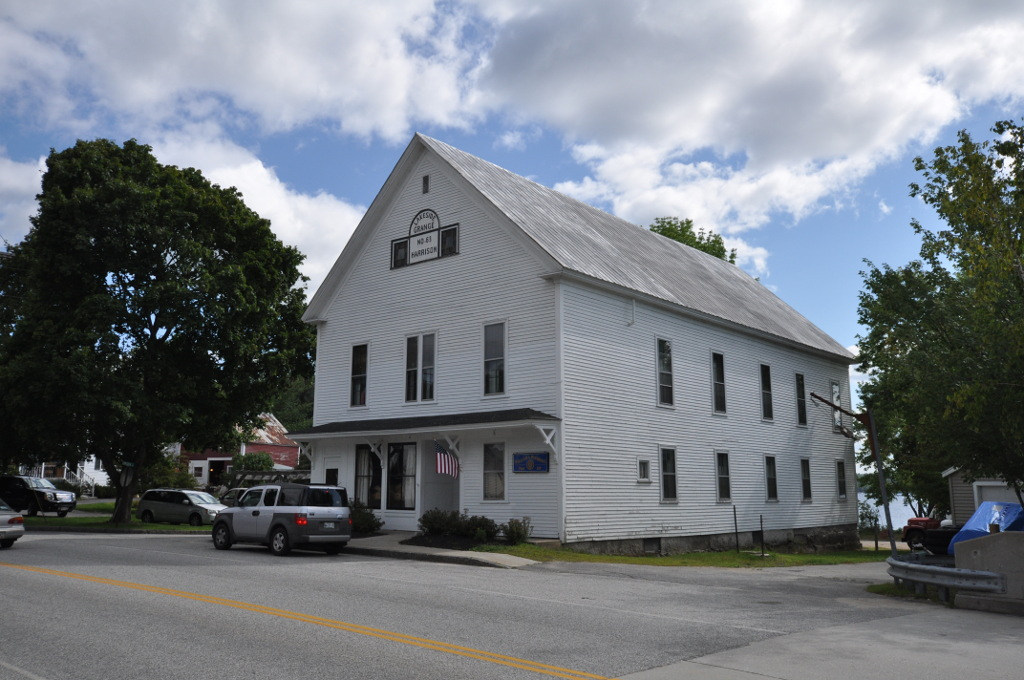

- Location within Maine Location within the United States
- Location: Main St., at Lincoln St., Harrison, Maine
- Coordinates: 44°6′37″N 70°40′54″W
- Area: 0.3 acres (0.12 ha)
- Built: 1905
- Architectural style: Colonial Revival
- NRHP reference No.: 05001173
- Added to NRHP: October 19, 2005

The Lakeside Grange No. 63 is a historic Grange hall on Main Street in Harrison, Maine. Built in 1905, it has served as a major community meeting space since then, notably surviving a 1907 fire that destroyed part of the town's center. It was listed on the National Register of Historic Places in 2005.

== Description and history ==
The Lakeside Grange is located in the village of Harrison, on the southwest side of Main Street (Maine State Routes 35 and 117), at its junction with Lincoln Street. It is a large rectangular 2 1/2-story wood-frame structure, with a gabled roof and clapboard siding. It is essentially vernacular in style, with ornament limited to the brackets support the hip-roofed hood extending across the front. The first floor has an irregular and asymmetrical arrangement, with a pair of display windows to the left of the off-center entrance, and a single sash window to its right. On the second level there is a centered pair of narrow windows, with sash windows in the outer bays. A Palladian-shaped sign is mounted in the gable. The interior was historically divided into a commercial space in the front, with meeting spaces behind, with a large auditorium space on the second floor. The auditorium has a balcony, and raised stage with backstage area.

The Lakeside Grange was organized in 1874, a time when Harrison was a largely agricultural community, and originally met in the town's Odd Fellows hall. It was one of several agriculturally-oriented organizations in the town (including an older Grange chapter in another village), and the chapter folded in the 1890s. It was revived in 1901, and had by 1905 outgrown all of the available community spaces. This hall was built in 1905, providing among other features the town's first performance venue with stage. It served as the town's primary community venue until the construction of larger spaces (the VFW hall and the Deertrees Theater). In 1907 a conflagration destroyed all of the larger buildings in the town, except for this one. It continues to be used as a community resource.

== See also ==
- National Register of Historic Places listings in Cumberland County, Maine
