= Scioto Grange No. 1234 =

- U.S. National Register of Historic Places
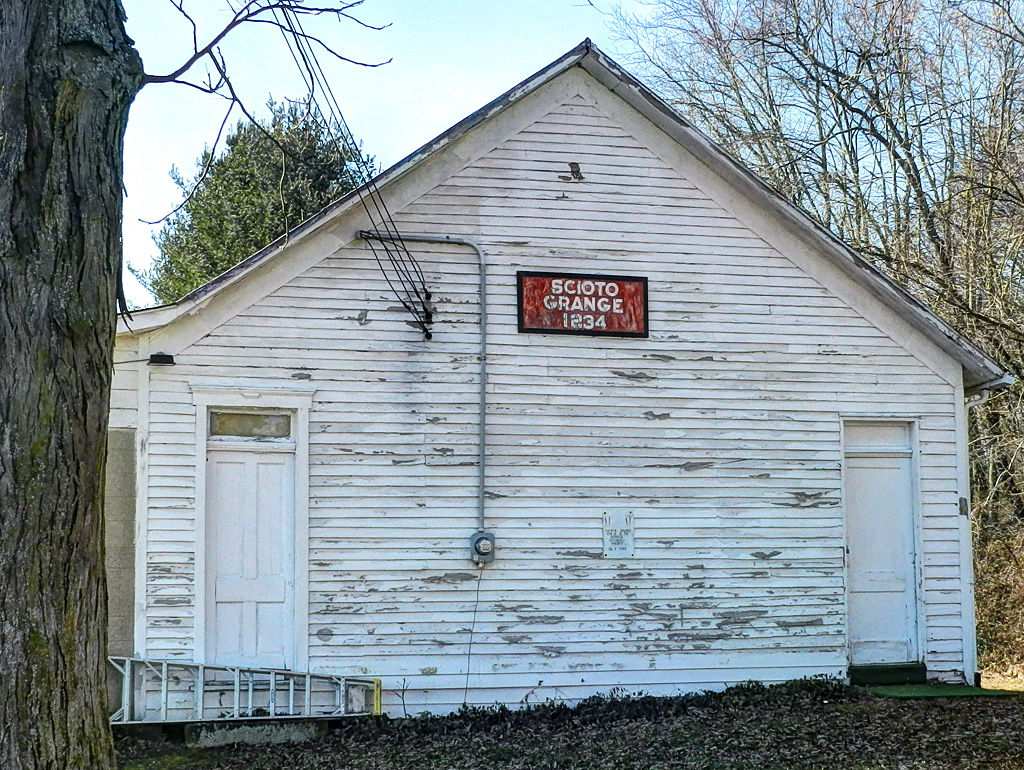
- Front of the hall

- Location within Ohio Location within the United States
- Location: 255 Cove Rd., Jackson, Ohio
- Coordinates: 39°0′49″N 82°44′52″W
- Area: less than one acre
- Built by: Davis, Joe
- NRHP reference No.: 05000030
- Added to NRHP: February 9, 2005

The Scioto Grange No. 1234, in Jackson, Ohio, served historically as a meeting hall, as a school, and as a specialty store. It was listed on the National Register of Historic Places in 2005.

It was built by the Scioto Grange No. 1234, a chapter of the Grange, in 1897, the year of founding of the chapter. It was a schoolhouse from 1917 to 1935. Part of the building served as a community store from 1907 to 1937.
