= Boulder Valley Grange No. 131 =

- U.S. National Register of Historic Places
- Colorado State Register of Historic Properties
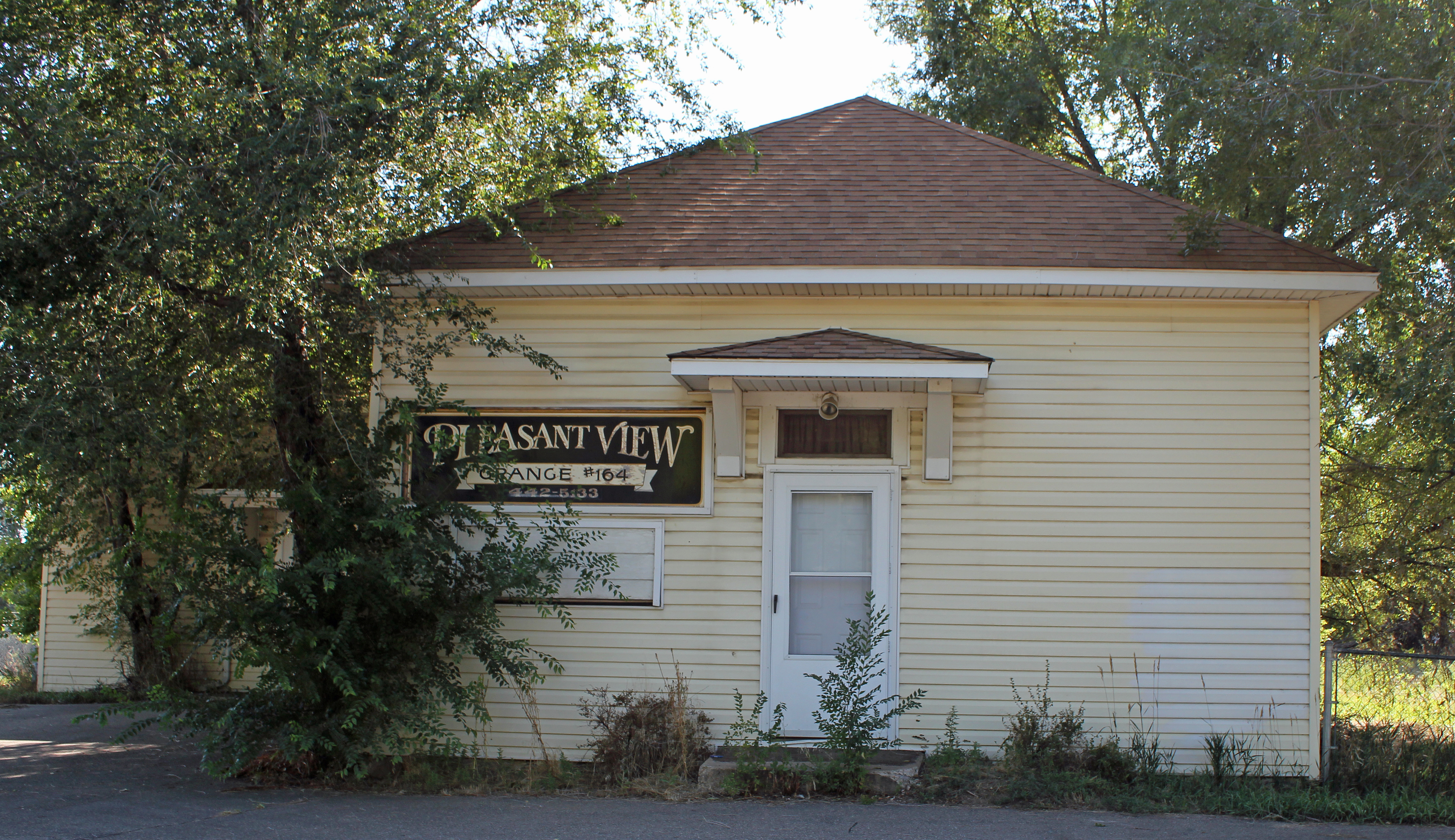

- Location within Colorado Location within the United States
- Location: 3400 N. 95th St, Lafayette, Colorado
- Coordinates: 40°2′13″N 105°7′48″W
- Area: 0.7 acres (0.28 ha)
- Built: 1900
- NRHP reference No.: 87002009
- CSRHP No.: 5BL.408
- Added to NRHP: December 07, 1987

Boulder Valley Grange No. 131, also known as Boulder Valley Community Hall, is an historic wooden Grange hall located at 3400 North 95th Street in Lafayette, Colorado. It was built in 1900 and features a hipped roof with clapboard sides. Various additions have been made which maintain its architectural integrity.

On December 7, 1987, it was added to the National Register of Historic Places.

Today it serves as the meeting place of Pleasant View Grange No. 164.
