= Mountainville Grange Hall =

- U.S. National Register of Historic Places
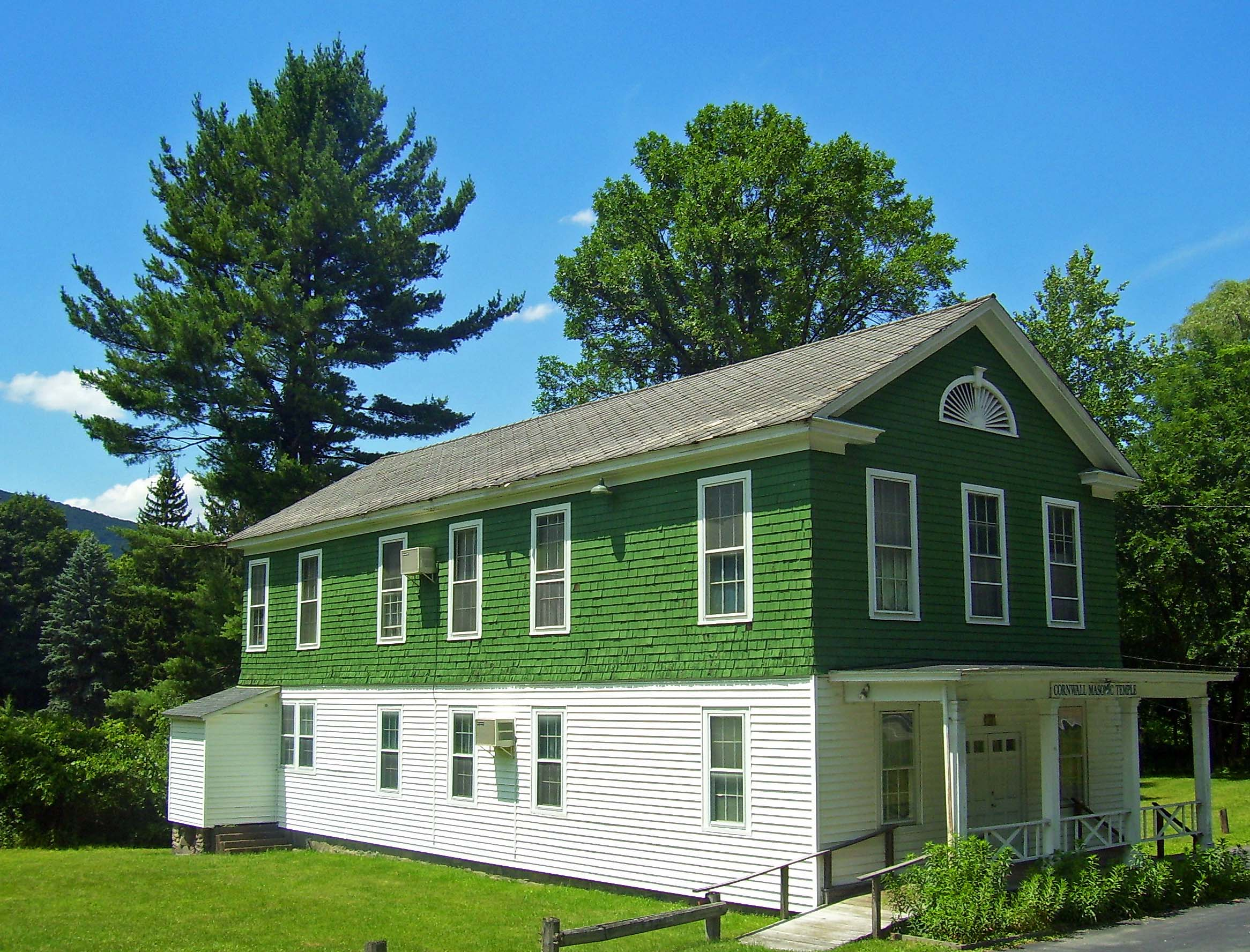
- South profile and east elevation, 2007

- Location within New York Location within the United States
- Location: Mountainville, NY
- Nearest city: Newburgh
- Coordinates: 41°24′1″N 74°4′46″W
- Built: 1904
- Architectural style: Colonial Revival
- MPS: Historic and Architectural Resources of Cornwall MPS
- NRHP reference No.: 96000557
- Added to NRHP: June 03, 1996

The Mountainville Grange Hall is located on NY 32 just south of the hamlet of Mountainville in the town of Cornwall, Orange County, New York, United States. Built in 1904, the National Grange sold it in 1984 to the Jerusalem Temple Lodge No. 721, a local Masonic body of the Grand Lodge of New York, and it was renamed the Cornwall Masonic Temple.

== History ==
In Mountainville, the Grange chapter was founded just before Christmas 1902. The hall was built two years later, and continued to be used as both a meeting place for the members and informal community center until the 1960s, when Grange membership declined steeply. It was home to an antique store during the 1970s, and was restored to its original function as a fraternal hall in 1984 when Jerusalem Temple Lodge bought it.

After being sold to the Masons, they made some renovations, such as improving the kitchen and meeting spaces, but the original character of the building was generally been preserved. At some point in the later 20th century, aluminum siding was installed on the first story, over the original clapboard. There have been no other modifications to the building.

On June 3, 1996 it was listed on the National Register of Historic Places.

Jerusalem Temple Lodge and its appendant Order of the Eastern Star chapter used the building until around 2009, after which time it became a daycare center.

== Building ==
It is a two-story three-by-six-bay frame building on a stone foundation, sided in white clapboard covered with aluminum on the first story and green wood shingles on the second. The gabled roof is itself shingled in asphalt, pierced by a brick chimney near the west rear end.

A sunburst-patterned vent is in the middle of the attic level on the eastern front facade. The center bay at the first story projects slightly to accommodate the main entrance, two paneled and recessed wooden doors in a plain frame. A porch extends across the first story, with a flat roof supported by four rectangular Doric columns connected by a balustrade. The porch roofline has a plain cornice and frieze with "Mountainville Grange 946 P of H" written on it. It was later covered with a wooden sign saying "Cornwall Masonic Temple".

Inside the building follows a common Grange hall plan: dining room and kitchen on the first floor, meeting room and stage on the second. This and its furnishings and trim are unaltered.
