= Grange Hill, County Durham =

Coordinates: 54.657°N 1.638°W

Grange Hill
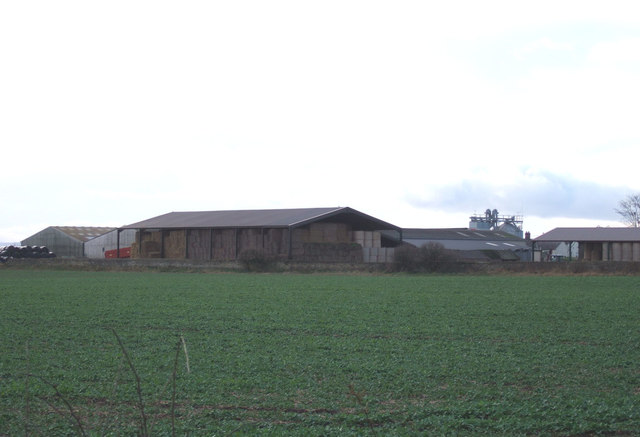
- Grange Hill Farm

- Location within County Durham
- OS grid reference: NZ234291
- Civil parish: Dene Valley
- Unitary authority: County Durham
- Ceremonial county: Durham
- Region: North East
- Country: England
- Sovereign state: United Kingdom
- Post town: DARLINGTON
- Postcode district: DL14
- Police: Durham
- Fire: County Durham and Darlington
- Ambulance: North East

Grange Hill is a hamlet in the civil parish of Dene Valley, in County Durham, in England. It is situated to the south of Coundon, near Bishop Auckland.
