= Grasmere Schoolhouse No. 9 and Town Hall =

- Grasmere Schoolhouse #9 and Town Hall
- U.S. National Register of Historic Places
- NH State Register of Historic Places
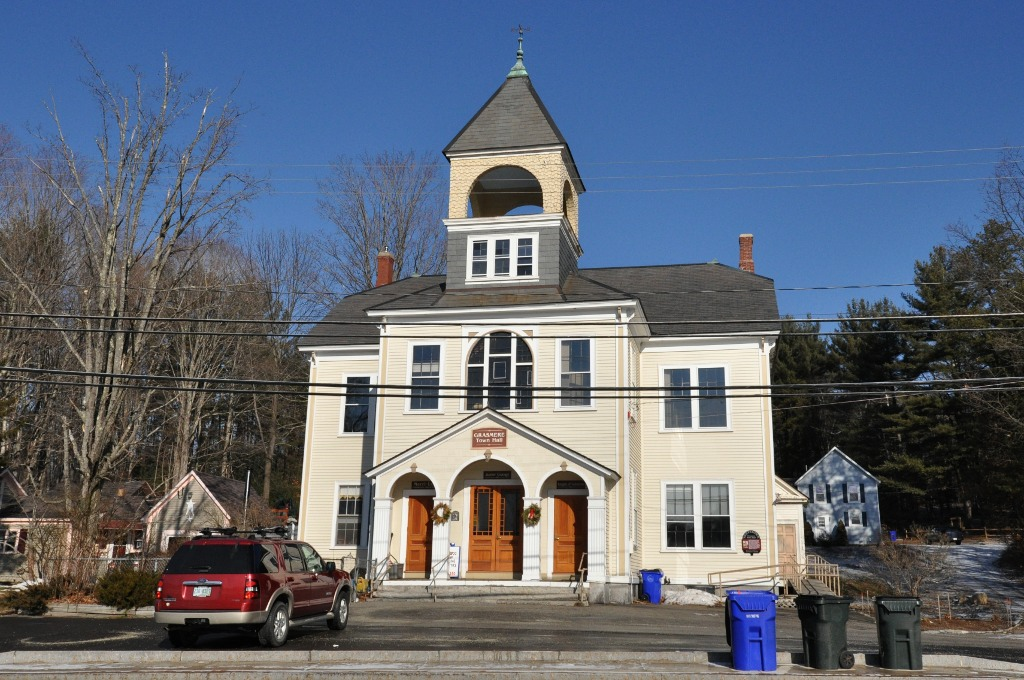
- Grasmere Town Hall in 2013

- Location within New Hampshire Location within the United States
- Location: 87 Center St., Goffstown, New Hampshire
- Coordinates: 43°1′18″N 71°32′46″W
- Area: 0.1 acres (0.040 ha)
- Architect: W.W. Ireland
- Architectural style: Queen Anne
- NRHP reference No.: 90001350

Significant dates
- Added to NRHP: September 05, 1990
- Designated NHSRHP: August 07, 2023

The Grasmere Schoolhouse No. 9 and Town Hall, also known as the Grasmere Grange Hall, is a historic municipal building located at 87 Center Street in the village of Grasmere in Goffstown, New Hampshire. Built in 1889 as a town hall and school, it has served a variety of civic and community functions since its construction, and is a good example of civic Queen Anne architecture. It was listed on the National Register of Historic Places in 1990.

== Description ==
The Grasmere Schoolhouse No. 9 and Town Hall is located on the north side of Center Street, a short way east of Grasmere's main intersection with Henry Bridge Road. It is a 2½-story wood-frame structure, with a clipped gable roof and clapboarded exterior. A two-story pavilion projects from the center of the street-facing long side, with a hip roof topped by a square tower. The tower has an open belvedere with round-arch openings, and is capped by a pyramidal roof. The main entrance is in the base of the pavilion, recessed in three round-arch openings under a single-story gable.

== History ==
Designed by W.W. Ireland in the Queen Anne style of architecture, it was built as a dual-function public building in 1889 on the site of a 1700s religious and governmental building. Over the years it has also been used by many local groups, including the now defunct Junior Grange No. 150, which was organized in 1890.

Although no longer used today for its two original uses, it is still used for some public purposes such as the Goffstown Municipal Court and other local governmental agencies. Current private uses include the Merri-Loo Community Preschool, which leases part of the ground floor, and the Jaycees.

== See also ==
- National Register of Historic Places listings in Hillsborough County, New Hampshire
