= Benton Grange No. 458 =

- Benton Grange #458
- U.S. National Register of Historic Places
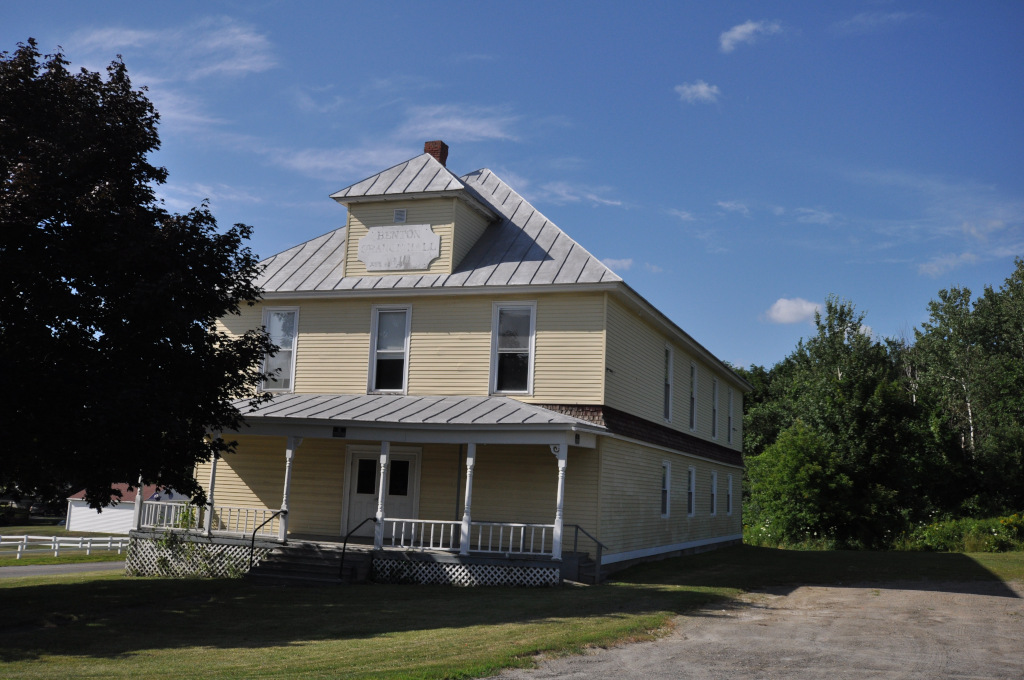

- Location within Maine Location within the United States
- Location: Jct. of River Rd. and School Dr., Benton, Maine
- Coordinates: 44°35′21″N 69°35′6″W
- Area: 1.7 acres (0.69 ha)
- Built: 1915
- Architect: Gifford, Frank M.
- Architectural style: Colonial Revival
- NRHP reference No.: 04000373
- Added to NRHP: April 28, 2004

The Benton Grange No. 458 is an historic Grange hall at 29 River Road in Benton, Maine, USA. Built in 1915, it is one of the rural community's largest buildings, serving for many years as a social and civic venue for the town. From 1915 to 1990 it housed the annual town meeting. It was listed on the National Register of Historic Places in 2004.

== Description and history ==
The Benton Grange is located in the village center of the town, at the northeast corner of River Road and School Drive. It is a long rectangular two story wood frame structure, with a hip roof, clapboard siding, and a concrete block foundation. The narrow front facade is three bays wide, with a hip-roofed single-story porch extending across it, supported by bracketed turned posts in the Queen Anne style. Above the porch three sash windows are symmetrically placed, and there is a hip-roof dormer projecting from the roof above, adorned with a wooden panel identifying the building and its year of construction. The interior houses a lobby, with restrooms, cloakroom, and ticket booth, with a dining room behind, and a large auditorium on the second floor.

The Benton Grange was organized in 1906, and its early meetings were held in the local school, but had by 1910 decided to build a dedicated meeting hall. The present hall was built in 1915 to a design by Fairfield architect Frank M. Gifford. The hall continues to be a meeting and social venue for the community, and its Grange chapter continues to be active, despite a general decline in agricultural activities in the community.

== See also ==
- National Register of Historic Places listings in Kennebec County, Maine
