= Hegel Road Historic District =

- U.S. National Register of Historic Places
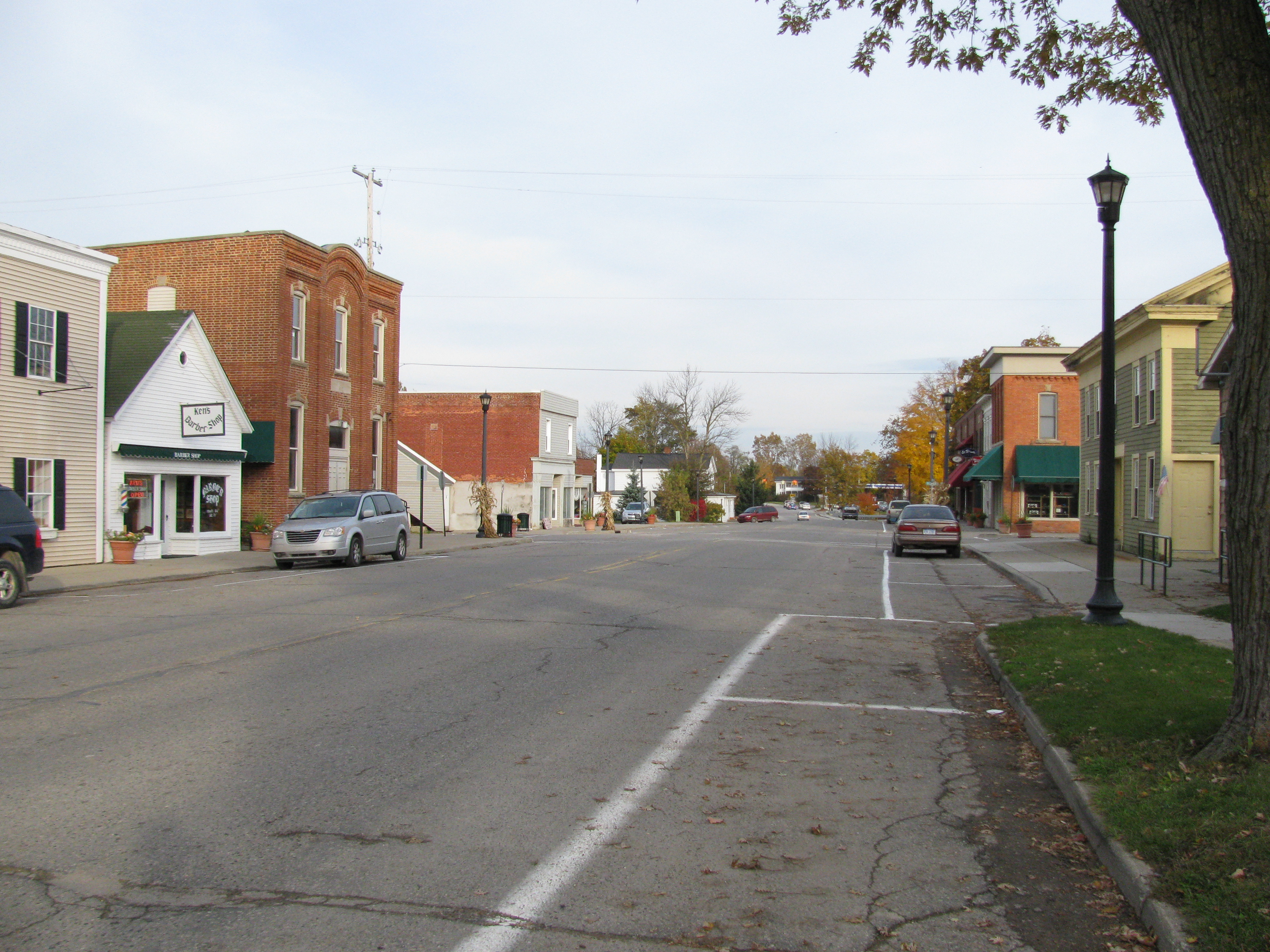
- Interactive map
- Location: Hegel Rd. between Seneca and the Goodrich Millpond, Goodrich, Michigan
- Area: 5.4 acres (2.2 ha)
- Architectural style: Greek Revival, Queen Anne
- MPS: Genesee County MRA
- NRHP reference No.: 82000511
- Added to NRHP: November 26, 1982

The Hegel Road Historic District is a mixed commercial and residential historic district located along Hegel Road between Seneca and the Goodrich Millpond in Goodrich, Michigan. It was listed on the National Register of Historic Places in 1982.

== History ==
In 1835, Levi H. Goodrich, and two of his six sons, Enos and Moses, moved from Erie County, New York and purchased 1,000 acres of land along the Kearsley Creek. Other family members and neighbors followed in 1836, and the Goodrich brothers built a dam and sawmill circa 1836–1837. The town of Goodrich was platted near the millpond, and the first frame homes, stores and an inn (the Goodrich House; still extant) were constructed in what is now the historic district. In 1844 a gristmill was constructed, and Goodrich became a processing center for the surrounding agricultural area. The village grew slowly during the latter part of the 19th century, adding small manufacturing and becoming a stagecoach stop. In 1877, a group of village women founded the Goodrich Ladies' Library Association and purchased a building on Main Street. A township hall was built in 1893.

As the twentieth century turned, the village grew slowly, with developers platting a small addition after the Detroit United Interurban Railway constructed lines southwest of the village in 1900. In 1916, a fire destroyed a row of frame buildings on Main Street and anew brick commercial block was constructed. As the village grew, several residential structures were added. However, the size of the town center essentially remained as it had, and 100 years later the core of the village remains intact.

== Description ==
The Hegel Road Historic District stretches along the two blocks of Hegel Road that define the original Goodrich town center, and includes twenty structures, seventeen of which contribute to the historic character of the district. Ten of these twenty structures are residential, four are institutional (two libraries, one post office, and one fire station), and six are commercial.

Construction materials in the district are varied. Notably, several one-story, end gable, wood-framed commercial structures are still standing in the district. The remaining commercial structures are brick, and of relatively modest ornamentation. The residential structures range from Greek Revival to Queen Anne to bungalow styles.

Significant structures include:

- Goodrich Ladies' Library: This building was originally a residence, but in 1883 it was purchased by the Goodrich Ladies' Library Association and converted into a library. In 1903, half of the building was destroyed by fire; the present building is the remaining half. The library is a one-and-one-half-story, wood-framed structure with a gable roof and clapboard siding.
- Atlas Town Hall: The town hall was built in 1893. It is a two-story, rectangular, brick structure with Victorian styling.
- Goodrich House: The Goodrich House was built in approximately 1846, and was one of the earliest structures built in the district. It served as a saloon and as an overnight stop for travelers. It is a two-story, L-shaped, wood-framed Greek Revival structure with clapboard siding.
