= Lower Intervale Grange No. 321 =

Historic place in New Hampshire, United States

- Lower Intervale Grange #321
- U.S. National Register of Historic Places
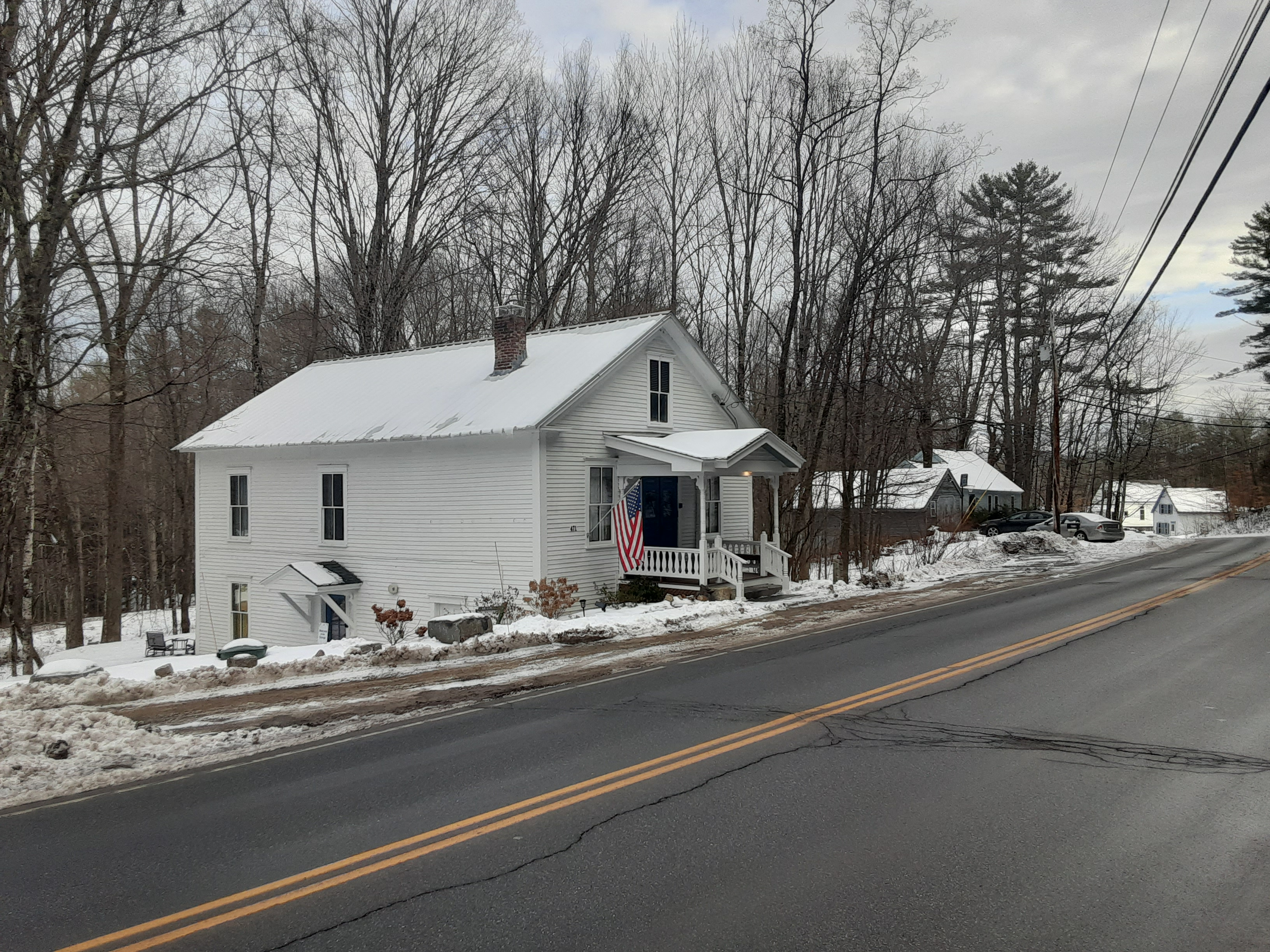
- Grange in 2023

- Location within New Hampshire
- Location: 471 Daniel Webster Hwy., Plymouth, New Hampshire
- Coordinates: 43.7237°N 71.6761°W
- Area: 9,999 acres (4,046 ha)
- Built: 1912
- NRHP reference No.: 100008224
- Added to NRHP: September 29, 2022

The Lower Intervale Grange #321, at 471 Daniel Webster Highway in the town of Plymouth in Grafton County, New Hampshire, was listed on the National Register of Historic Places in 2022.

The Grange Hall was built in 1912, and the building has changed little since.

It was listed "for its architectural integrity as well as for its association with the national Grange movement."

It is a one-and-a-half-story building, clapboarded, with a "distinctive shed roof" and a front-facing gable. Its front porch, rebuilt in 2021, includes original or restored balusters, "corner posts with ornamental turnings and scrolled sawn brackets." Two cornerstones show "1912" and "L.I.G." Apparently ten cents was the price to have your name recorded in paper within one of the cornerstones.

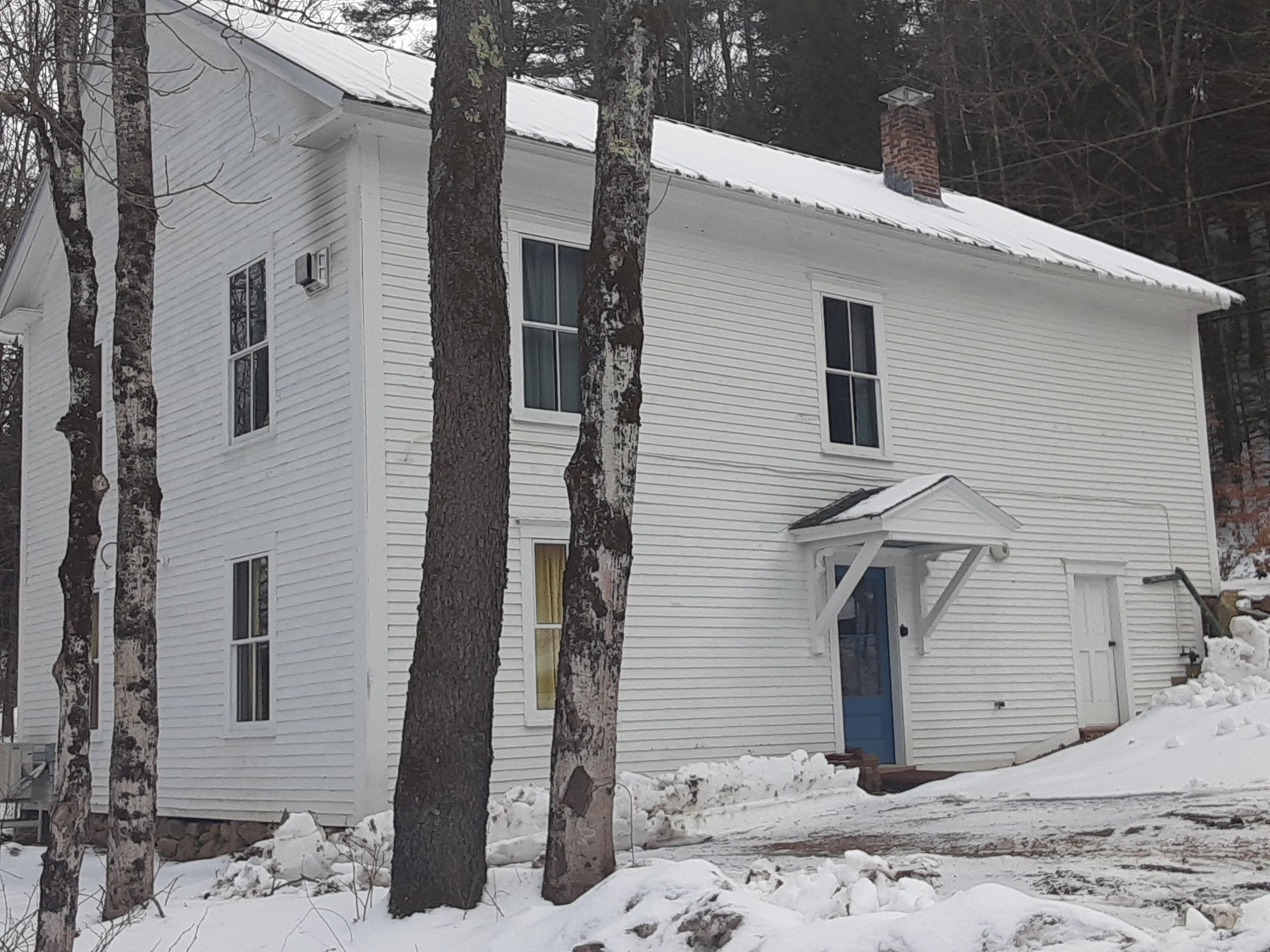
Side and rear

Its lower level is accessible from the side and includes kitchen facilities.

The Manchester Ink Link online newspaper has published photos of the main meeting space and of the exterior.
