= Golden Rod Grange No. 114 =

- U.S. National Register of Historic Places
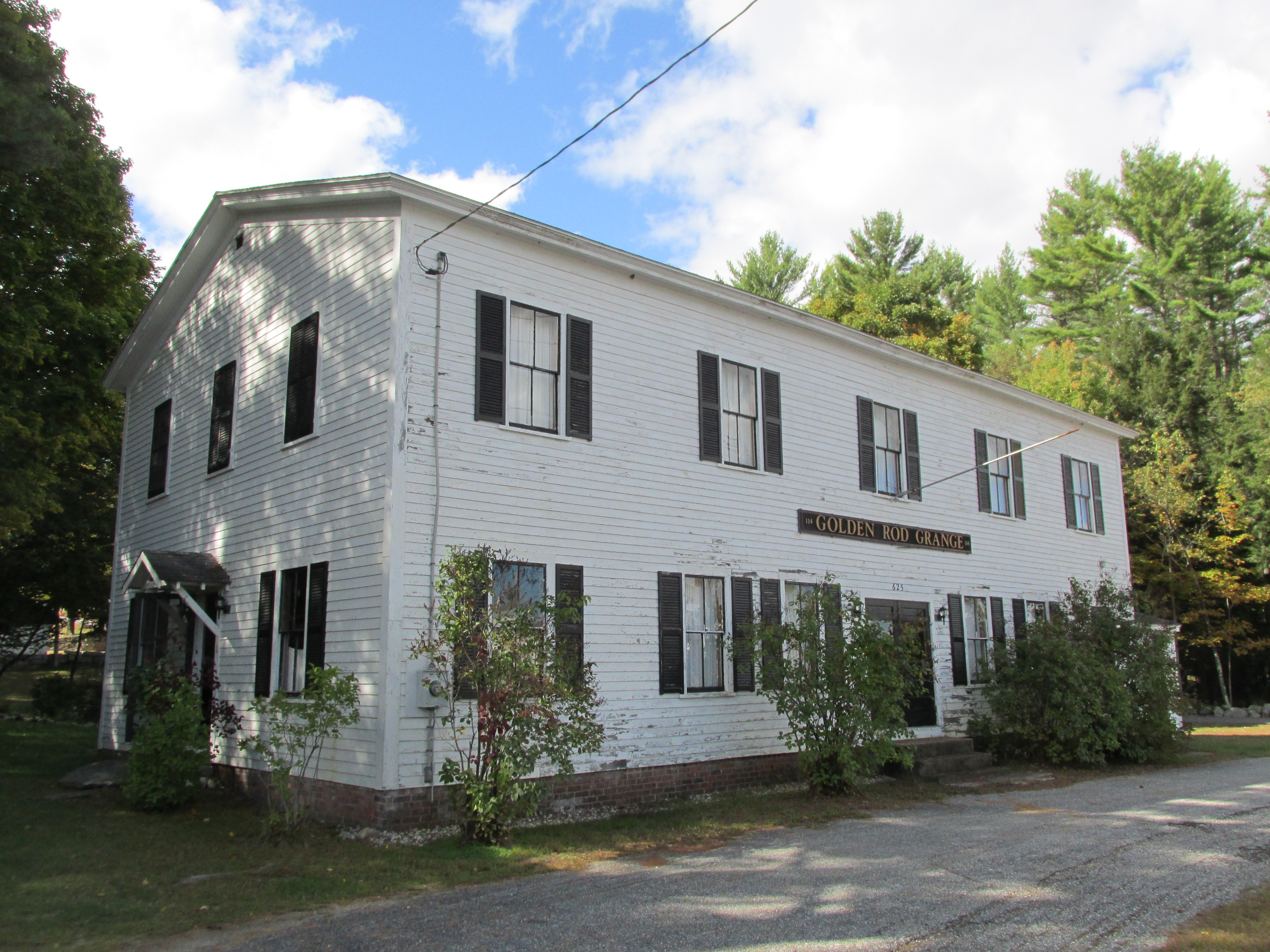
- Golden Rod Grange No. 114

- Location within New Hampshire Location within the United States
- Location: W side NH 32, 0.1 mi. S of jct. with Eaton Rd., Swanzey, New Hampshire
- Coordinates: 42°52′20″N 72°16′57″W
- Area: 1 acre (0.40 ha)
- NRHP reference No.: 94000169
- Added to NRHP: March 17, 1994

The Golden Rod Grange No. 114 is a historic Grange hall on New Hampshire Route 32 in Swanzey, New Hampshire, United States. Built in 1916, it continues to occupy a significant place in the community as a meeting and function space. The little-altered building was listed on the National Register of Historic Places in 1994. It is now owned by the town and maintained by the Swanzey Preservation Society.

== Description and history ==
The Golden Rod Grange stands in the village center of Swanzey, on the west side of New Hampshire Route 32, opposite the church and town hall. It is a two-story rectangular wooden structure, with a gabled roof and clapboarded exterior. It is about 60 by 32 feet (18.3 m × 9.8 m) in size, presenting the long facade to the street. That facade has five symmetrically placed windows on the second floor, and an irregular arrangement of windows on the ground floor, with the main entrance at the center and a secondary entrance at the right end. The interior is divided into a meeting and dining hall with kitchen on the ground floor, and auditorium with antechamber on the upper level. In the auditorium, the roof's Warren trusses are exposed. Most of the original wall finishes are plaster and pine, although these have been covered in some areas.

The building was constructed in 1915–16 to serve the local Grange chapter, its layout typifying functions commonly supported by New England Grange chapters. The building's modifications have generally been limited to cosmetic alterations, including the covering over of original finishes, and the addition of a steel fire escape on the north end of the building. The stage curtain in the auditorium is painted to depict a local pond. The building is now maintained by the Swanzey Preservation Society.

== See also ==
- National Register of Historic Places listings in Cheshire County, New Hampshire
