= La Prairie Grange Hall No. 79 =

- LaPrairie Grange Hall No. 79
- U.S. National Register of Historic Places
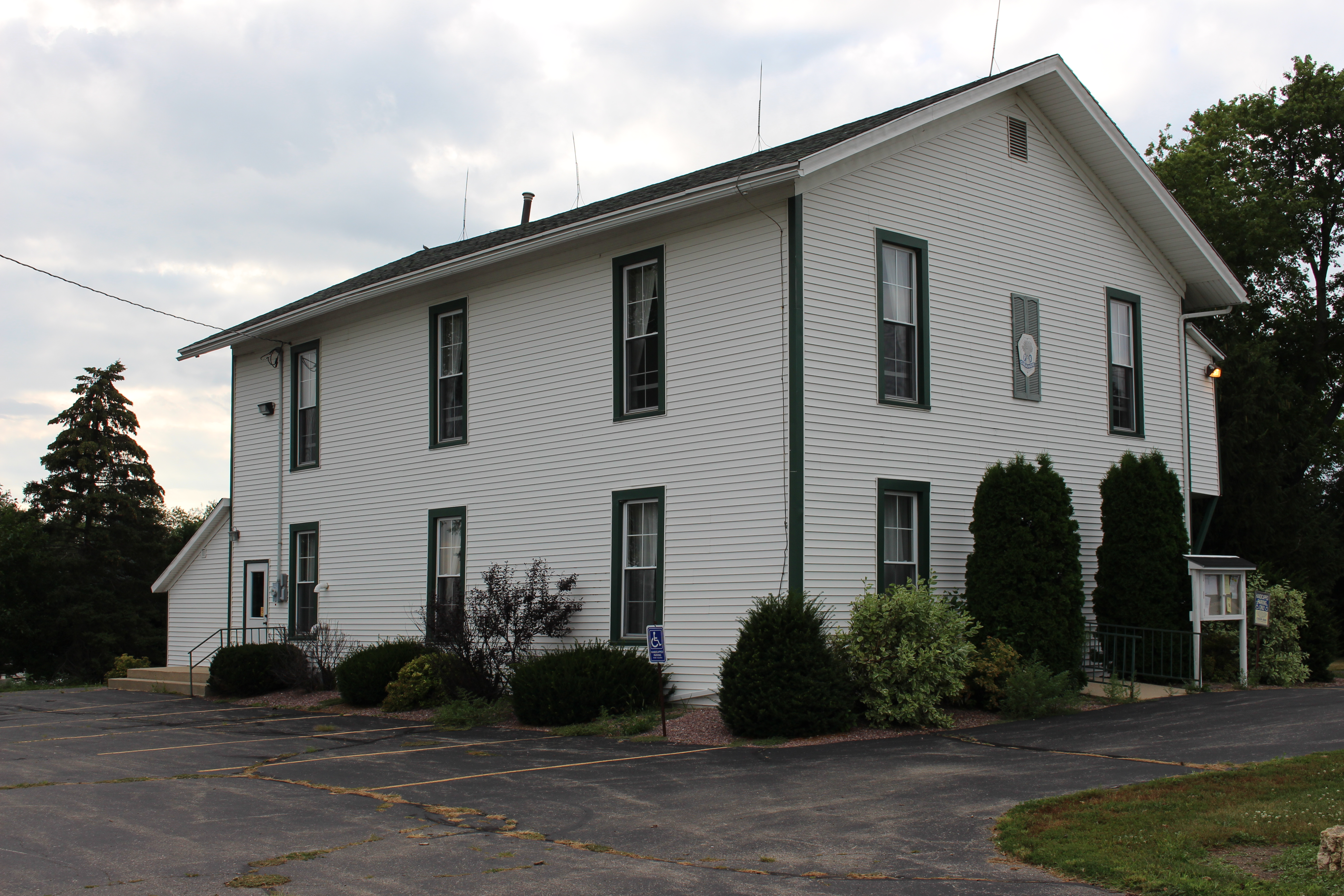

- Location within Wisconsin Location within the United States
- Location: La Prairie, Wisconsin
- Coordinates: 42°37′37″N 88°57′12″W
- Area: 0.1 acres (0.040 ha)
- Built: 1874
- Architectural style: Italianate
- NRHP reference No.: 77000050
- Added to NRHP: April 11, 1977

La Prairie Grange Hall No. 79, also known as the La Prairie Town Hall, is a historic two-story wooden Grange hall built in 1874 in La Prairie, Rock County, Wisconsin. One of the oldest remaining Grange halls in the U.S., it was listed on the National Register of Historic Places in 1977.

The National Grange of the Order of Patrons of Husbandry was formed in 1867, a fraternal organization of farmers organized initially to protect them against railroad monopolies. Like Freemasons, the Grange had secret rituals. Unlike the masons, the Grange admitted women the same as men. Over the years their efforts shifted to eliminating middlemen, and advocating free rural mail delivery, and rural electrification.

The Grange in La Prairie was organized in 1873 as chapter no. 79. The chapter built their meeting hall the following year. The town of La Prairie provided the land and $700 and the Grange provided the building, with the agreement that the town would "have and own a room... on the first floor and to front on the road." The Grange could use that room as a dining hall when not in use by the town, along with the rest of the building.

The building is a simple two-story wooden structure clad in white clapboard and green trim, with a rather low-pitched gable roof. The windows are tall four over four, evenly spaced. Inside, the first story consists of a large meeting room and dining hall in front and kitchen in back. Upstairs, reached by a staircase in the back is the larger hall, used for Grange meetings, dances, and 4-H plays. The walls are covered with the original vertical tongue and groove paneling, crossed by a chair rail. The building cost $1,938.50.

Ever since, the local Grange has been a social center in La Prairie, hosting card parties, dancing, church services, educational events, and meetings. In 1960, the town relinquished its ownership interest in the property, but continues to share its use with the Grange, which uses it as its meeting place.

Today the La Prairie Grange Hall is the oldest left standing in Wisconsin and one of the oldest in the whole U.S.
