= Garland Grange Hall =

- U.S. National Register of Historic Places

- Location within Maine Location within the United States
- Location: Off ME 94, Garland, Maine
- Coordinates: 45°2′27″N 69°9′38″W
- Area: 2 acres (0.81 ha)
- Built: 1891
- Architectural style: Greek Revival, Italianate
- NRHP reference No.: 75000105
- Added to NRHP: May 12, 1975

The Garland Grange Hall is a historic Grange hall on Oliver Hill Road in Garland, Maine. Built in 1891, it is one of the finest 19th-century Grange halls in the state, exhibiting a combination of Greek Revival and Italianate features. It has served as a social center for the community since its construction. It was listed on the National Register of Historic Places in 1975.

== Description and history ==
The Garland Grange Hall stands on the west side of Oliver Hill Road, in the rural community's dispersed village center, a short way north of its junction with Maine State Route 94. It is a 2 1/2-story wood-frame building, with a front-facing gable roof, clapboard siding, and granite stone foundation. The building's corners are finished with Greek Revival paneled pilasters, with paired Italianate brackets at the top, supporting a broad eave. The front (east-facing) facade is symmetrical, with a central entrance sheltered by a hood with Italianate brackets. Windows are six-over-six sash, except for the window in the gable, which is fixed and has a round-arch top. Beneath the overhanging edges of the roof is a band of decorative rosettes. The interior has retained original wooden finishes. It is laid out with a dining hall and kitchen on the ground floor, and an auditorium on the second floor. Original 19th-century tables and chairs remain in use.

The Patrons of Husbandry (more commonly called the Grange) was organized in Maine in 1873. The Garland Grange chapter was established the following year, and this hall was built by its members in 1891. It is one of the oldest Grange halls in the state to exhibit any significant degree of architectural sophistication, and exhibits a common thread of Maine's 19th century architecture, retaining older styles after they have passed out of fashion elsewhere.

== See also ==
- National Register of Historic Places listings in Penobscot County, Maine
