= Grange Hall, Lake County, Illinois =

Grange Hall, Illinois
- Unincorporated community
- Location within Illinois Location within the United States
- Coordinates: 42°21′50″N 87°57′48″W
- Country: United States
- State: Illinois
- County: Lake
- Township: Warren
- Elevation: 758 ft (231 m)
- Time zone: UTC-6 (Central (CST))
  - Summer (DST): UTC-5 (CDT)
- Area codes: 847 & 224
- GNIS feature ID: 1772872

Grange Hall is an unincorporated community in Lake County, Illinois, United States. Grange Hall is located at 42°21′50″N 87°57′48″W.
