= Copake Grange Hall =

- U.S. National Register of Historic Places
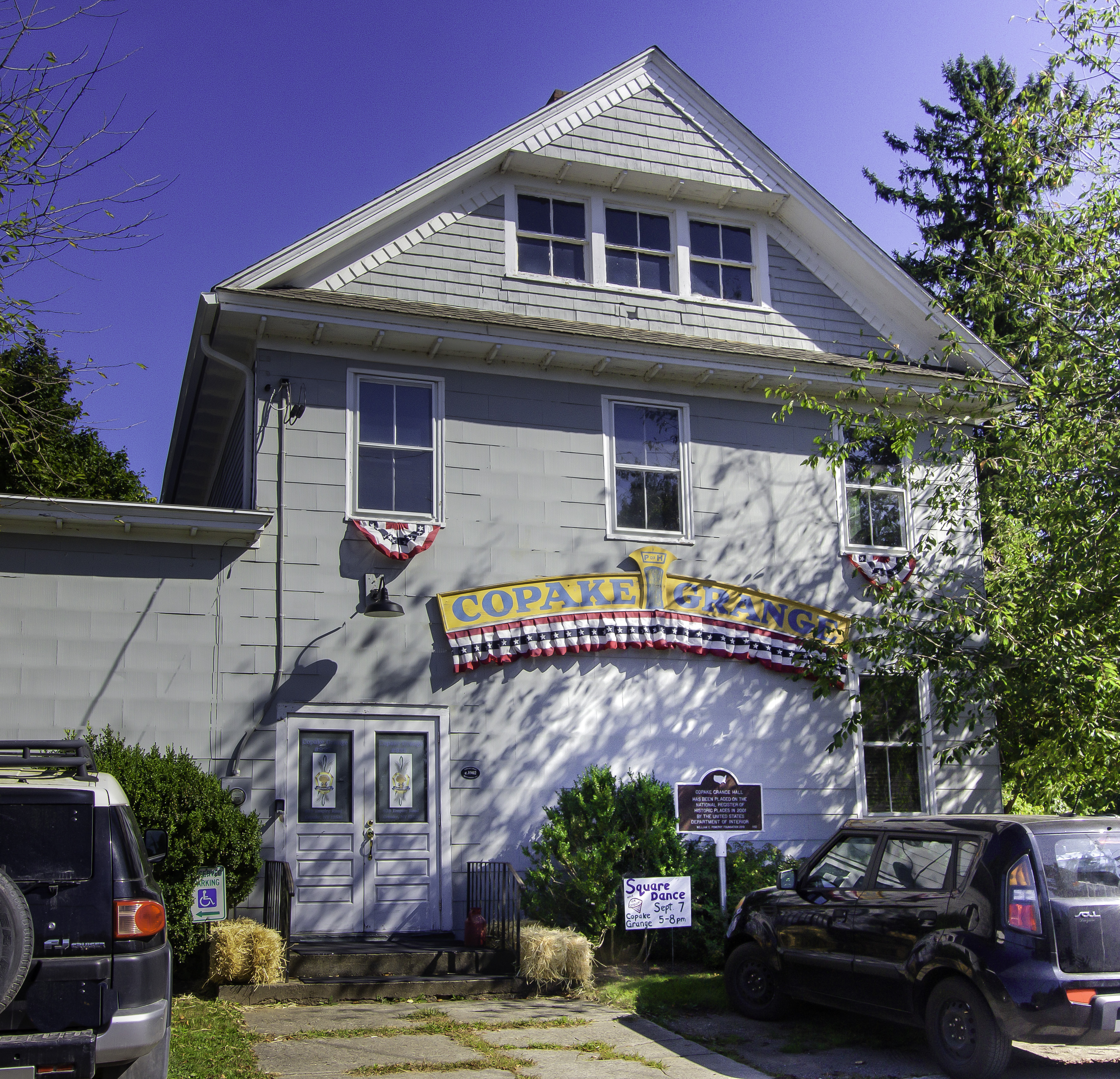

- Location within New York Location within the United States
- Location: Empire Rd., S of Old Rte 22, Copake, New York
- Coordinates: 42°6′9″N 73°33′1″W
- Area: less than one acre
- Built: 1902
- NRHP reference No.: 01000291
- Added to NRHP: July 3, 2001

Copake Grange Hall, also known as Copake Grange #935, is a historic Grange hall located at Copake in Columbia County, New York, U.S.A. It was built in 1902–1903, with additions in 1906 and 1921. It is a two-story wood-frame building with a gable roof and two one story flat roofed wings. For many years the second floor served as a public library.

It was added to the National Register of Historic Places in 2001.
