= Garland, Maine =

Town in Maine, United States

- Town
- Location within Maine Location within the United States
- Coordinates: 45°03′15″N 69°08′32″W
- Country: United States
- State: Maine
- County: Penobscot

Area
  - Total: 37.94 sq mi (98.26 km^{2})
  - Land: 37.67 sq mi (97.56 km^{2})
  - Water: 0.27 sq mi (0.70 km^{2})
- Elevation: 482 ft (147 m)

Population (2020)
  - Total: 1,026
  - Density: 27/sq mi (10.5/km^{2})
- Time zone: UTC-5 (Eastern (EST))
  - Summer (DST): UTC-4 (EDT)
- ZIP code: 04939
- Area code: 207
- FIPS code: 23-27190
- GNIS feature ID: 582488
- Website: www.garlandmaine.net

Garland is a town in Penobscot County, Maine, United States. The population was 1,026 at the 2020 census.

== History ==
Garland was settled in 1802 and incorporated in 1811. It was named for the first settler, Joseph Garland, who came from Salisbury, New Hampshire.

The township was originally granted by the Commonwealth of Massachusetts to Williams College, which sold it to a series of proprietors in 1798. It was originally called "Lincoln" after one of them, Levi Lincoln.

The town had 1,247 people by 1859.

== Geography ==
According to the United States Census Bureau, the town has a total area of 37.94 square miles (98.26 km^{2}), of which 37.67 square miles (97.56 km^{2}) is land and 0.27 square miles (0.70 km^{2}) is water.

== Demographics ==
Historical population
Census	Pop.	Note	%±
1820	275		—
1830	621		125.8%
1840	1,065		71.5%
1850	1,247		17.1%
1860	1,498		20.1%
1870	1,306		−12.8%
1880	1,211		−7.3%
1890	973		−19.7%
1900	857		−11.9%
1910	817		−4.7%
1920	677		−17.1%
1930	673		−0.6%
1940	610		−9.4%
1950	581		−4.8%
1960	568		−2.2%
1970	596		4.9%
1980	718		20.5%
1990	1,064		48.2%
2000	990		−7.0%
2010	1,105		11.6%
2020	1,026		−7.1%
U.S. Decennial Census

=== 2010 census ===
As of the census of 2010, there were 1,105 people, 442 households, and 319 families living in the town. The population density was 29.3 inhabitants per square mile (11.3/km^{2}). There were 552 housing units at an average density of 14.7 per square mile (5.7/km^{2}). The racial makeup of the town was 97.9% White, 0.4% African American, 0.2% Native American, and 1.5% from two or more races. Hispanic or Latino of any race were 0.5% of the population.

There were 442 households, of which 28.7% had children under the age of 18 living with them, 57.0% were married couples living together, 10.2% had a female householder with no husband present, 5.0% had a male householder with no wife present, and 27.8% were non-families. 20.1% of all households were made up of individuals, and 9.3% had someone living alone who was 65 years of age or older. The average household size was 2.50 and the average family size was 2.83.

The median age in the town was 44.6 years. 22.2% of residents were under the age of 18; 6.9% were between the ages of 18 and 24; 21.5% were from 25 to 44; 35.5% were from 45 to 64; and 13.9% were 65 years of age or older. The gender makeup of the town was 51.9% male and 48.1% female.

=== 2000 census ===
As of the census of 2000, there were 990 people, 379 households, and 270 families living in the town. The population density was 26.2 inhabitants per square mile (10.1/km^{2}). There were 497 housing units at an average density of 13.2 per square mile (5.1/km^{2}). The racial makeup of the town was 97.78% White, 0.20% African American, 0.51% Native American, 0.10% Asian, 0.40% Pacific Islander, and 1.01% from two or more races. Hispanic or Latino of any race were 0.40% of the population.

There were 379 households, out of which 34.8% had children under the age of 18 living with them, 59.4% were married couples living together, 6.9% had a female householder with no husband present, and 28.5% were non-families. 22.2% of all households were made up of individuals, and 8.2% had someone living alone who was 65 years of age or older. The average household size was 2.61 and the average family size was 3.05.

In the town, the population was spread out, with 28.3% under the age of 18, 6.9% from 18 to 24, 29.5% from 25 to 44, 23.6% from 45 to 64, and 11.7% who were 65 years of age or older. The median age was 38 years. For every 100 females, there were 100.4 males. For every 100 females age 18 and over, there were 100.0 males.

The median income for a household in the town was $27,500, and the median income for a family was $31,534. Males had a median income of $30,057 versus $16,959 for females. The per capita income for the town was $12,624. About 15.1% of families and 20.0% of the population were below the poverty line, including 31.6% of those under age 18 and 13.9% of those ages 65 or older.

== Notable person ==
- Frederick Wintle, Maine state representative

== Notable structures ==
- Garland Grange Hall, listed on the National Register of Historic Places
