= Third Meetinghouse =

Historic church in Massachusetts, United States

- U.S. National Register of Historic Places
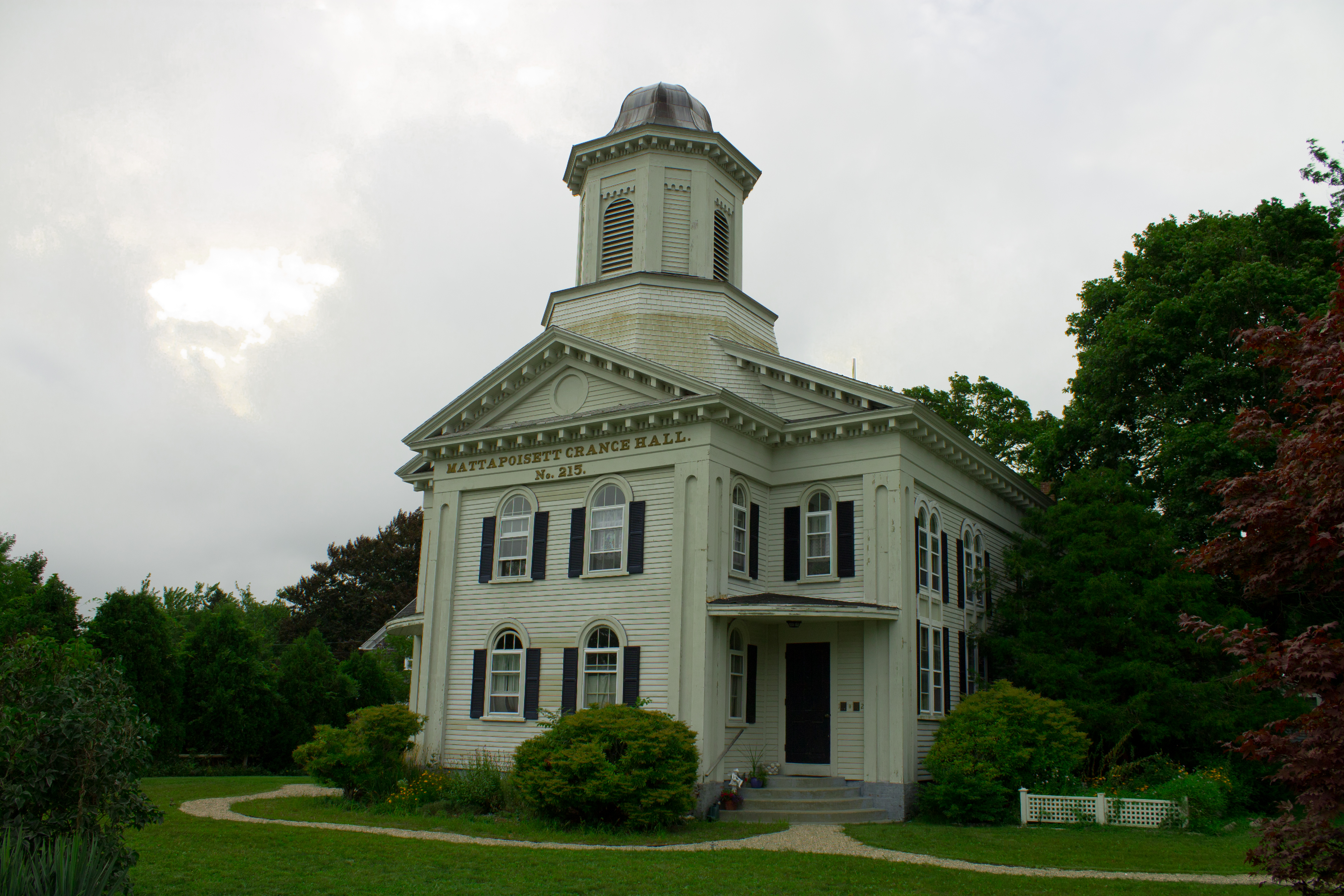
- The Third Meeting House in 2012

- Location within Massachusetts Location within the United States
- Location: 1 Fairhaven Rd., Mattapoisett, Massachusetts
- Coordinates: 41°39′43″N 70°49′13″W
- Area: 0.3 acres (0.12 ha)
- Built: 1816
- Architectural style: Italianate
- NRHP reference No.: 76000956
- Added to NRHP: January 2, 1976

The Third Meetinghouse is an historic church, community meeting house and Grange Hall at 1 Fairhaven Road in Mattapoisett, Massachusetts. Built in 1816, it is the town's oldest surviving public building, and the one in which the meeting leading to its separation from Rochester took place. The building was added to the National Register of Historic Places in 1976.

== Description and history ==
Historic drawing of the Third Meetinghouse

The Third Meetinghouse occupies a prominent place in Mattapoisett's town center, at the northwest corner of Main and Fairhaven Streets. It is a two-story wood frame structure, with a gabled roof and clapboarded exterior. It has a projecting gabled section at the center of its front facade, with entrances flanking it on either side. Rising above the main roof and this section is an octagonal tower, whose second stage features round-arch louvers, and whose top is in a bellcast shape. The building corners have paneled pilasters, and the gables and eaves are adorned with modillion blocks. Many of the windows are topped by rounded arches in the Italianate style.

The Third Meetinghouse was built in 1816 for the Second Parish of Rochester (established 1736), after its second meetinghouse had its roof blown off by a hurricane. In 1837 the parish population held a meeting in which it was decided to seek separation from Rochester, resulting in Mattapoisett's eventual incorporation in 1857. The building was at first used for both civic and religious purposes, with the congregation moving out after 28 years because it outgrew the space. In 1854, the building was adapted for use as a secondary school, which operated until 1862. After 1870 the meeting house became the Barstow School. The building was acquired by the local Grange chapter in 1915.

== See also ==
- National Register of Historic Places listings in Plymouth County, Massachusetts
