= Rogue River Valley Grange No. 469 =

- Formerly listed on the U.S. National Register of Historic Places
- Location within Oregon Location within the United States
- Location: 2064 Upper River Rd., Grants Pass, Oregon
- Coordinates: 42°26′26″N 123°21′4″W
- Area: 1 acre (0.40 ha)
- Built: 1923
- Architect: J.M. Branscombe
- Architectural style: Bungalow/Craftsman
- NRHP reference No.: 92000130

Significant dates
- Added to NRHP: March 09, 1992
- Removed from NRHP: March 27, 2025

Rogue River Valley Grange No. 469 was a historic Grange hall located at 2064 Upper River Road in Grants Pass, Oregon. It was built in 1923 in the bungalow craftsman style. It was added to the National Register of Historic Places in 1992, and was delisted in 2025.

The Grange hall was destroyed by fire on June 18, 2012. The local Grange organization remains an active part of the Oregon State Grange.
