= Lowell Grange =

- U.S. National Register of Historic Places
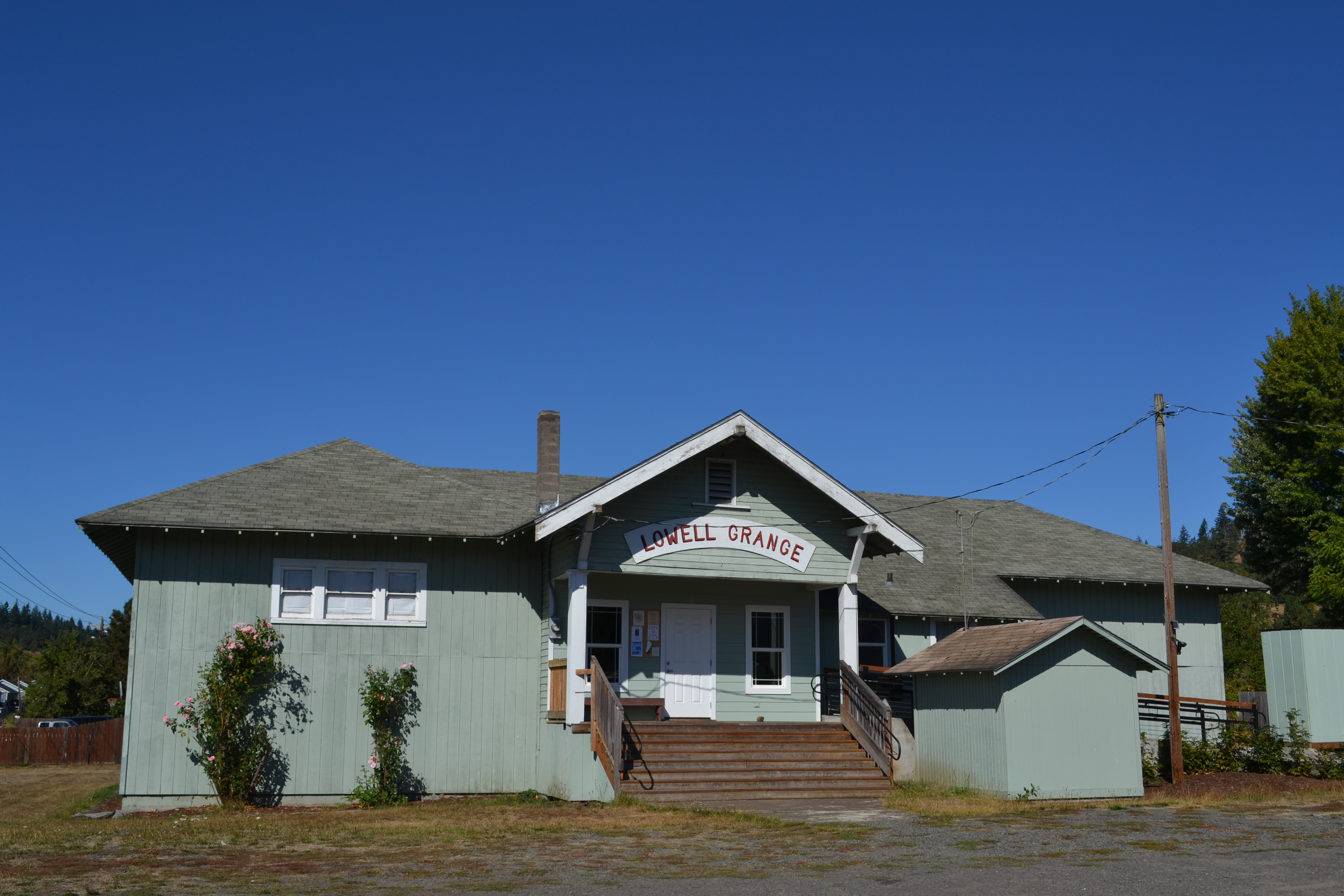

- Location within Oregon Location within the United States
- Location: 51 E 2nd St., Lowell, Oregon
- Coordinates: 43°55′17″N 122°46′54″W
- Area: less than one acre
- Built: 1913
- Architectural style: Bungalow/Craftsman
- NRHP reference No.: 05000849
- Added to NRHP: August 10, 2005

The Lowell Grange, also known as Lowell School, in the rural community of Lowell, Oregon, was built in 1940 as a school building. Later, although in historic era, it was renovated to be used as a Grange hall. It was listed on the National Register of Historic Places in 2005.

It was then the last surviving historic public building in the community.
