= Thousand Island Grange Hall =

- U.S. National Register of Historic Places
- Location within New York Location within the United States
- Location: E side of Gore Rd., N of jct. with NY 180, Hamlet of Omar, Orleans, New York
- Coordinates: 44°15′40″N 75°58′20″W
- Area: less than one acre
- Built: 1900
- MPS: Orleans MPS
- NRHP reference No.: 96000664
- Added to NRHP: June 28, 1996

Thousand Island Grange Hall, also known as 1000 Island Grange #593, is a historic grange hall located at Orleans in Jefferson County, New York. It was built about 1900 and is a long, rectangular two story frame building, 25 feet wide and 75 feet long, on a poured concrete foundation.

It was listed on the National Register of Historic Places in 1996.
