= Church Hill Grange Hall =

- U.S. National Register of Historic Places
- Location within Kentucky Location within the United States
- Nearest city: Hopkinsville, Kentucky
- Coordinates: 36°47′58″N 87°34′28″W
- Area: 0.7 acres (0.28 ha)
- Built: 1878
- MPS: Christian County MRA
- NRHP reference No.: 75000744
- Added to NRHP: August 28, 1975

Church Hill Grange Hall, near Hopkinsville, Kentucky, is a Grange hall that was built in 1878. It served historically as a meeting hall. It was listed on the National Register of Historic Places in 1975.

In 1975, it was owned by the Church Hill Community Club, successor to Church Hill Grange No. 109, and it was asserted to be the last surviving Grange hall in Kentucky.
