= Grasmere, New Hampshire =

Unincorporated community in New Hampshire, United States

- Unincorporated community
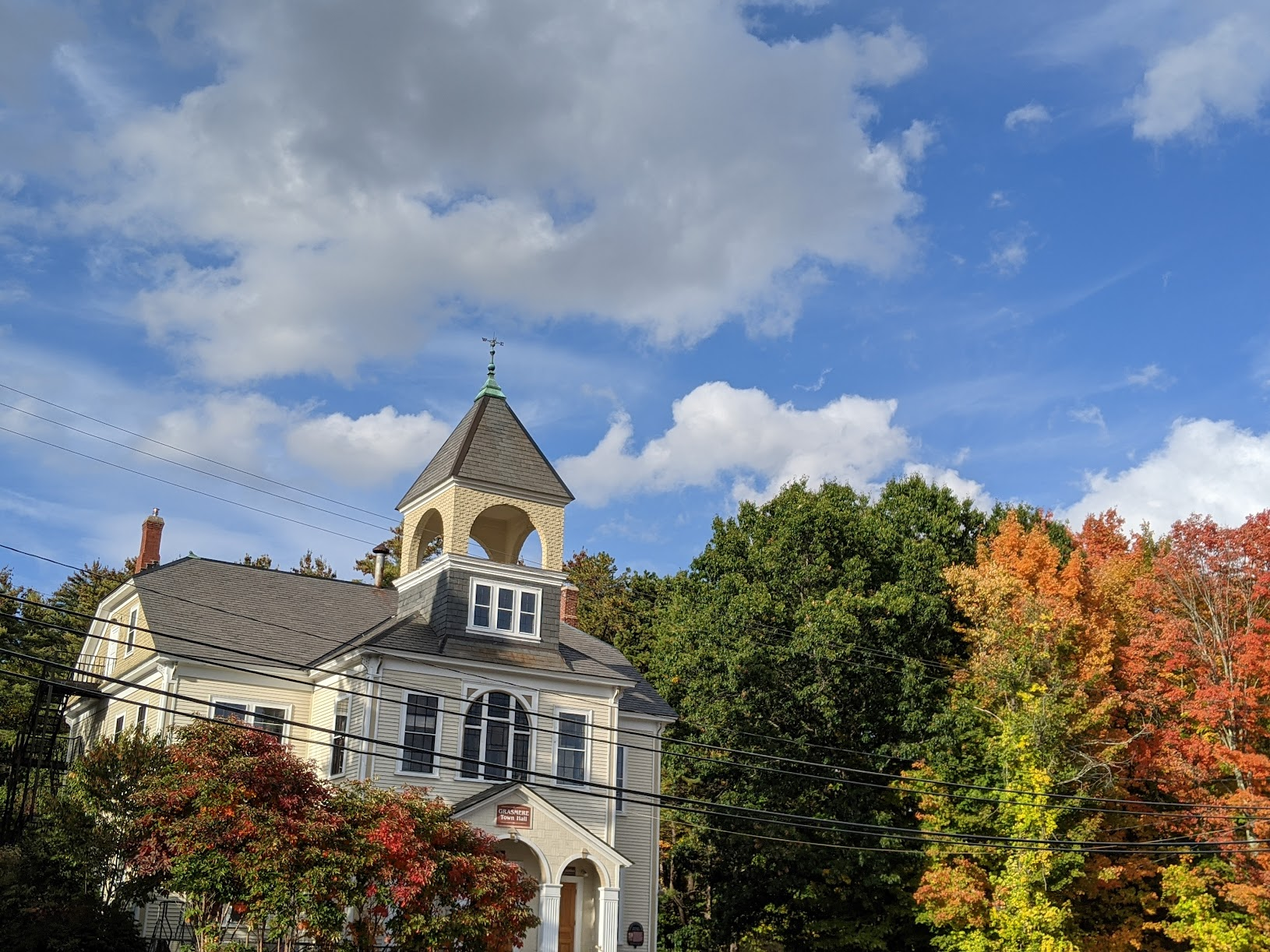
- Town Hall in 2020

- Location within New Hampshire Location within the United States
- Coordinates: 43°01′20″N 71°32′35″W
- Country: United States
- State: New Hampshire
- County: Hillsborough
- Town: Goffstown
- Elevation: 285 ft (87 m)
- Time zone: UTC-5 (Eastern (EST))
  - Summer (DST): UTC-4 (EDT)
- Area code: 603
- GNIS feature ID: 867187

Grasmere, originally known as "Goffstown Centre", is an unincorporated community within the town of Goffstown, New Hampshire, United States. It straddles the Piscataquog River in the eastern part of Goffstown.

The southern portion of Grasmere used to be the site of the Hillsborough County Hospital, County Farm (penal institution) and Poorhouse. Perpendicular to those locations on the opposing northern side of the Piscataquog are the Grasmere General Store and the Grasmere Grange Hall at 86 Center Street (43°1′19″N 71°32′42″W); the building originally served as Grasmere Village's Town Hall (according to a sign posted in front of it) and has been occupied during the last decades of the twentieth century and the first decade of the twenty-first century by Merri-Loo Community Preschool, a non-profit cooperative school established in 1968. Across Center Street from the Grange Hall is the Hillside Cemetery with a sign posted dating its establishment "circa 1768" as of 2011 as well as the attached Hillside United Methodist Church. A sign above the main entrance to the Church reads,

1842
1 ST. M. E. CHURCH
GRASMERE N.H.
1878

The Hillsborough County Railroad Station was located in Grasmere on the southern side of the river. Rail-borne freight for Grasmere and other surrounding locales was retrieved at this station during the late nineteenth and early twentieth centuries. Another rail station in Goffstown was located further to the west nearer to the town center, and a third was Parker's Station to the west of the town center, nearing the border with Weare.
