= Elm Grange =

Former historic house in Delaware, US

- U.S. National Register of Historic Places
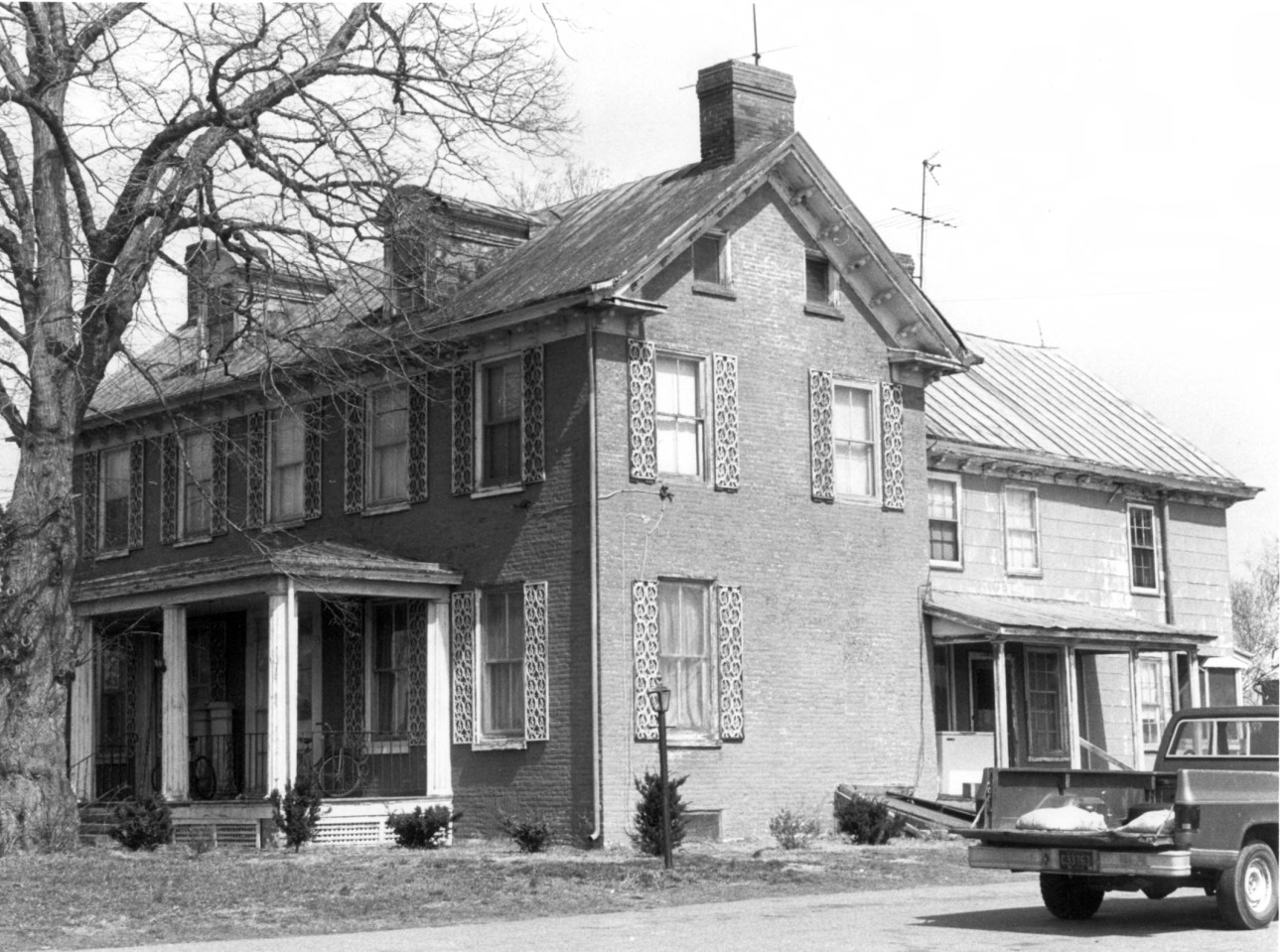
- The house in 1984

- Location within Delaware Location within the United States
- Location: 2424 South Dupont Parkway in St Georges Hundred, near Odessa, Delaware
- Coordinates: 39.497156°N 75.648978°W
- Area: 1 acre (0.40 ha)
- Built: 1840
- Architectural style: Greek Revival, Italianate, Federal
- MPS: Rebuilding St. Georges Hundred 1850-1880 TR
- NRHP reference No.: 85002120
- Added to NRHP: September 13, 1985

The Elm Grange, also known as Evergreen Acres, was a historic home located near Odessa in New Castle County, Delaware, United States. It was built about 1840, and was a 2 1/2-story, five-bay, L-shaped brick dwelling with a two-story rear wing. It had a center hall plan. It had a gable roof with dormers and the front facade featured a tetra-style porch with fluted columns.

It was listed on the National Register of Historic Places in 1985. The house was demolished between 2007 and 2009.
