= Oliver Kelley Farm =

Farm and museum in Minnesota, United States

- Oliver H. Kelley Homestead
- U.S. National Register of Historic Places
- U.S. National Historic Landmark
- Minnesota State Register of Historic Places
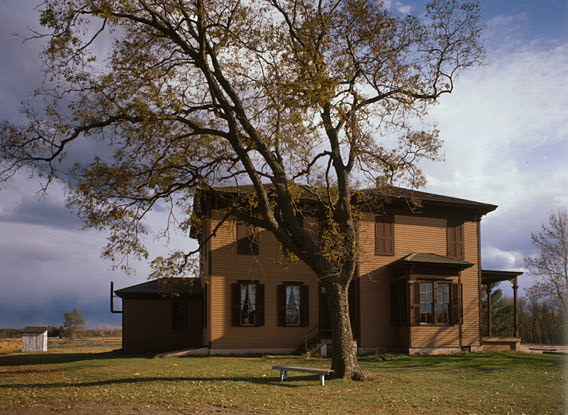
- The farmhouse at the Oliver Kelley Farm

- Location within Minnesota Location within the United States
- Location: 15788 Kelley Farm Road, Elk River, Minnesota
- Coordinates: 45°15′27″N 93°32′18″W
- Area: 189 acres (76 ha)
- Built: 1850–1870, 1876
- Architect: Unknown
- Architectural style: Italianate
- NRHP reference No.: 66000406

Significant dates
- Designated NHL: July 19, 1964
- Designated NRHP: October 15, 1966

The Oliver Kelley Farm is a farm museum in Elk River, Minnesota, United States. From 1850 to 1870 it was owned by Oliver Hudson Kelley, one of the founders of the National Grange of the Order of Patrons of Husbandry, the country's first national agrarian advocacy group. The Oliver Kelley Farm is operated as a historic site by the Minnesota Historical Society. It was declared a National Historic Landmark in 1964 under the name Oliver H. Kelley Homestead—which also places it on the National Register of Historic Places—for its national significance in the themes of agriculture and social history. It was nominated as a representative of the beginnings of agrarian activism in the United States, setting the stage for the Farmers' Alliance and the People's Party of the late 19th century.

== History ==
Oliver Kelley (1826–1913) moved to Minnesota in 1849, the year that Minnesota Territory was formed. Although he knew little about farming, he taught himself using agricultural journals and correspondence with other "scientific-oriented" farmers. He became an expert on farming in Minnesota, and he learned how adverse events such as bad weather, debt, insect pests, and crop failures could devastate a farmer's fortunes. In 1864, he became a clerk in the United States Department of Agriculture. After the end of the American Civil War, he toured the agricultural resources of the Southern states. When he returned to Washington, D.C., he was convinced that farmers' fortunes could be improved through cooperative associations with other farmers. Along with several other associates, he founded the National Grange of the Order of Patrons of Husbandry in 1867. The following year Kelley returned to this farm, helping organize Minnesota's state-level Grange and 37 local Granges.

Kelley moved back to Washington, D.C., in 1870, suffering from ill health but still active in Grange leadership. The extant farmhouse was built in 1876 on the foundations of the original Kelley family farmhouse. The farm remained in the ownership of the family until 1901. The National Grange bought the farm in 1935 and donated it to the Minnesota Historical Society in 1961. Today, the farm offers tours by guides in period costume, who invite visitors to help out with farm chores such as picking vegetables, churning butter, and making soap.

In 2003, state budget shortfalls threatened closure for the historical site. In response, the group Friends of the Kelley Farm was organized to help raise money to close the funding gap. The Friends group also supports the educational goals of the site and works for the site's preservation.

In 2017, the Minnesota Historical Society opened a new visitor center and modern Farm Lab area with a barn, garden and cropland. These new facilities in combination with Kelley's historic 1860s farmstead allow the historic site to explore agricultural history from the 1860s through modern day.

== See also ==
- List of museums in Minnesota
- List of National Historic Landmarks in Minnesota
- National Register of Historic Places listings in Sherburne County, Minnesota
