= Grange Hall (West Tisbury, Massachusetts) =

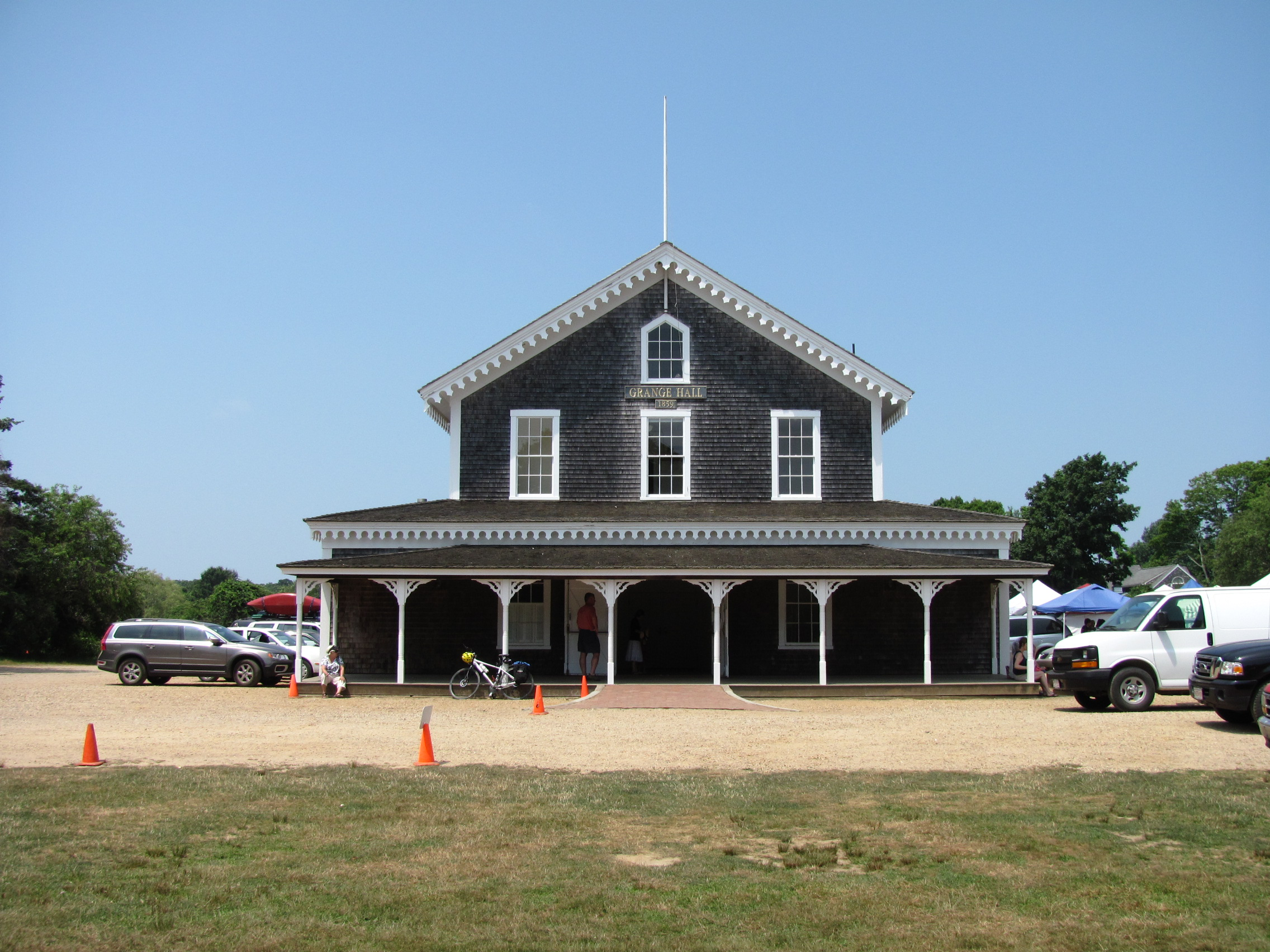
- Grange Hall

- Location within Massachusetts
- 41°22′48.89″N 70°40′31.01″W
- Location: West Tisbury, Massachusetts

History
- Built: 1859

The Grange Hall in West Tisbury, Massachusetts is a historic post-and-beam building that was built in 1859. West Tisbury is on the island of Martha's Vineyard. The building is owned and has been restored by the Martha's Vineyard Preservation Trust, and is available for use.

The building was built in 1859 "by the Martha's Vineyard Agricultural Society at the crossroads of the Island". It "was the location for the Agricultural Fair until 1994. Sold to the Trust by the Town in 1997 and completely restored, this grand post and beam barn stands as an enduring landmark, the site of a variety of traditional Island activities."

== See also ==
- List of Grange Hall buildings
