= Off =

Off or OFF may refer to:

== Art and entertainment ==
- Off (video game), a video game by Mortis Ghost.
- Sven Väth, German DJ and singer who uses the pseudonym OFF
- Off (album), by Ciwan Haco, 2006
- Off! (album), by Off!
- Off!, an American hardcore punk band
- "Off", a song by Royce da 5'9" from Layers
- "Off", a song by the American band Bright from their self-titled album
- Our Favorite Family, a nickname for the Simpson family in the animated television series The Simpsons

== Computing ==
- OFF (file format), for polygon meshes
- Open Font Format
- Owner-Free File System, a P2P network

== Government and politics ==
- Offutt Air Force Base, near Omaha, Nebraska
- Oil-for-Food Programme, the United Nations arrangement with Iraq in existence from 1995 to 2003
- United States Office of Facts and Figures (OFF); see OWI (United States Office of War Information)

== Other uses ==
- Of, a city in Turkey
- Off, spoiled, as in drinks and foods that have exceeded their shelf life
- Off side, one half of a cricket field
- Off! (brand), an insect repellent
- Open Food Facts, a crowdsourced database
- Over Flanders Fields, a 2005 combat flight simulation video game set in World War I;
- Carol Off, Canadian journalist
- Oslo Freedom Forum, series of global conferences run by Human Rights Foundation

== See also ==
- Offside (disambiguation)
- ORF (disambiguation)
- Orff (disambiguation)
