= Offside =

Offside, off-side or off side may refer to:

== Sport ==
- Offside (sport), a rule in a number of field team sports restricting where players may position themselves
  - Football codes
    - Offside (association football)
    - Offside (American football)
    - Offside (rugby)
  - Hockey
    - Offside (bandy)
    - Offside (ice hockey)
    - Offside (field hockey)
- Off side, a side of the field in cricket fielding

== Media ==
- Offside (TV series), Scottish football programme
- Offside (manga), a Japanese football manga from Natsuko Heiuchi
- Offside (2000 film), a 2000 Turkish comedy-drama film
- Offside (2005 film), German film
- Offside (2006 Iranian film), Iranian film
- Offside (2006 Swedish film), Swedish film
- Offside (magazine), Swedish football magazine
- Offside (book), Spanish novel from Manuel Vázquez Montalbán
- Off Sides (Pigs vs. Freaks), 1980s American film starring Eugene Roche, Grant Goodeve and Tony Randall
- "Off Sides" (Home Improvement), a 1991 television episode

== Other uses ==
- Offside, the side of the car furthest from the curb; See Right- and left-hand traffic
- Off-side rule, an interpretation for indentation in some computer programming languages
- Off-side goals rule, in Scots law, the rule that ownership becomes voidable if the transfer is in breach of a personal right capable of becoming a real right held by a third party and the disponee is aware of this

== See also ==
- Off-site (disambiguation)
