= Off-site =

Off-site may refer to:

- Off-site data protection in data management
- Off-site art exhibit or off-site art show
- Off-site construction in building
- Off Site (restaurant), a restaurant in Miami, Florida, United States
- The Off-Site Source Recovery Project, a US radioactive materials recovery initiative

== See also ==
- Offside (disambiguation)
