= Københavns Idrætspark =

Sports venue in Copenhagen, Denmark

Idrætsparken
- Parken
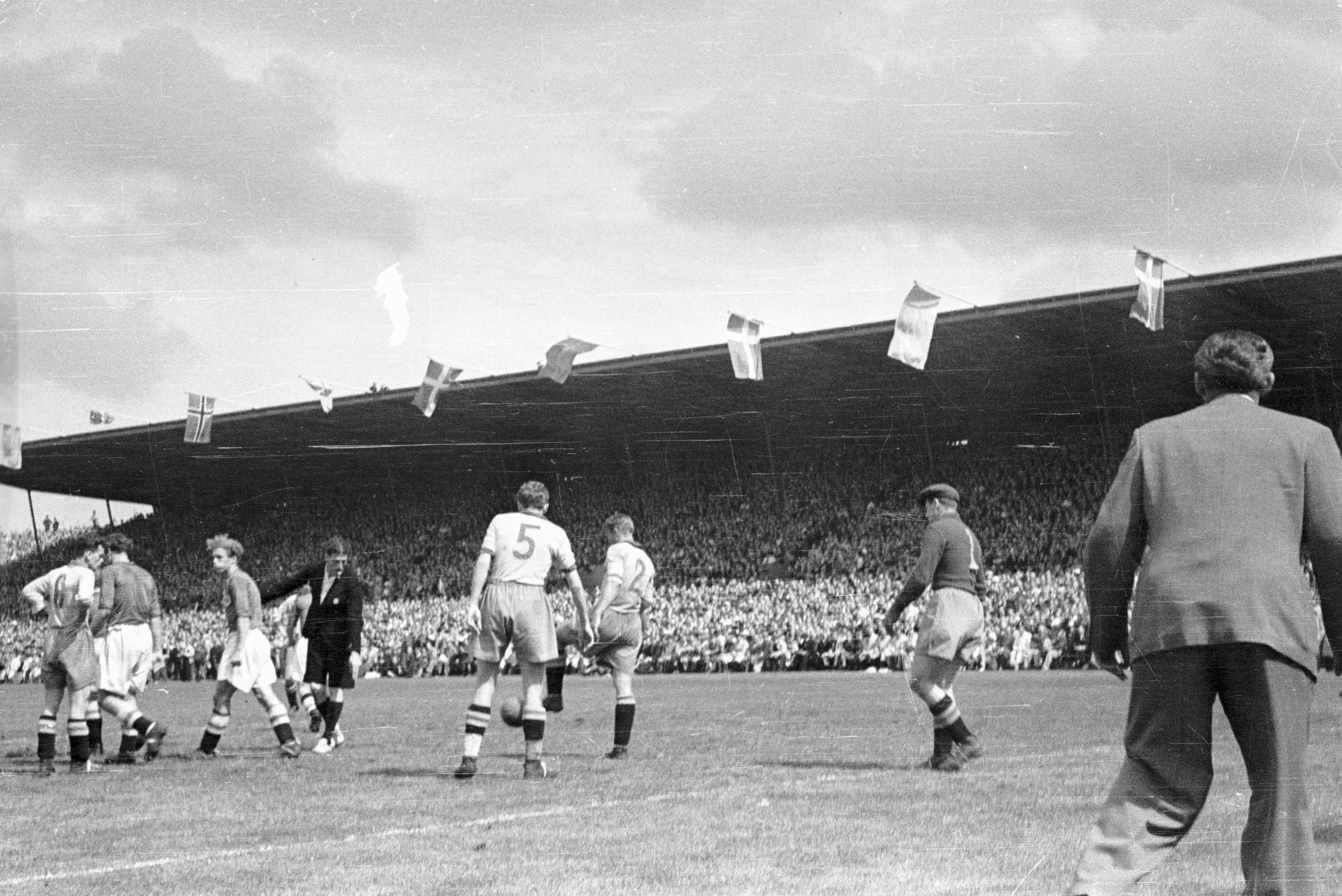
- Denmark v Sweden, 1 July 1945
- Interactive map of Idrætsparken
- Full name: Københavns Idrætspark
- Location: Copenhagen, Denmark
- Coordinates: 55°42′09″N 12°34′20″E
- Operator: Driftselskabet Idrætsparken
- Capacity: 52 211
- Surface: Grass

Construction
- Opened: 25 May 1911
- Closed: 1990
- Demolished: 1990

Tenants
- Denmark; Kjøbenhavns Boldklub

Københavns Idrætspark, in daily use Idrætsparken, also known as Parken, was a multi-purpose stadium in Copenhagen, Denmark. It was initially used as the stadium of Denmark national football team and Kjøbenhavns Boldklub. It was replaced by the Parken Stadium in 1992. The capacity of the stadium was 51,000 spectators.

The main stadium, the first fully enclosed ground in Denmark, opened on the 25 May 1911, with a capacity of 12000, with a football match between a Copenhagen XI and The Wednesday of England.

By the end of the 1920s, the Idrætsparken boasted the main stadium, a separate athletics track (1912), indoor sports hall (1914), hockey pitch, and an indoor swimming pool (1929).

The main stand, which was retained in the new Parken Stadium, was inaugurated on 2 October 1955, England defeating Denmark 5-1.

From 1911 to 1990, the Danish national team played 232 games at Idrætsparken, winning 125 games and losing 66.
