= Albert Lammers House =

Historic house in Minnesota, United States

- U.S. National Register of Historic Places
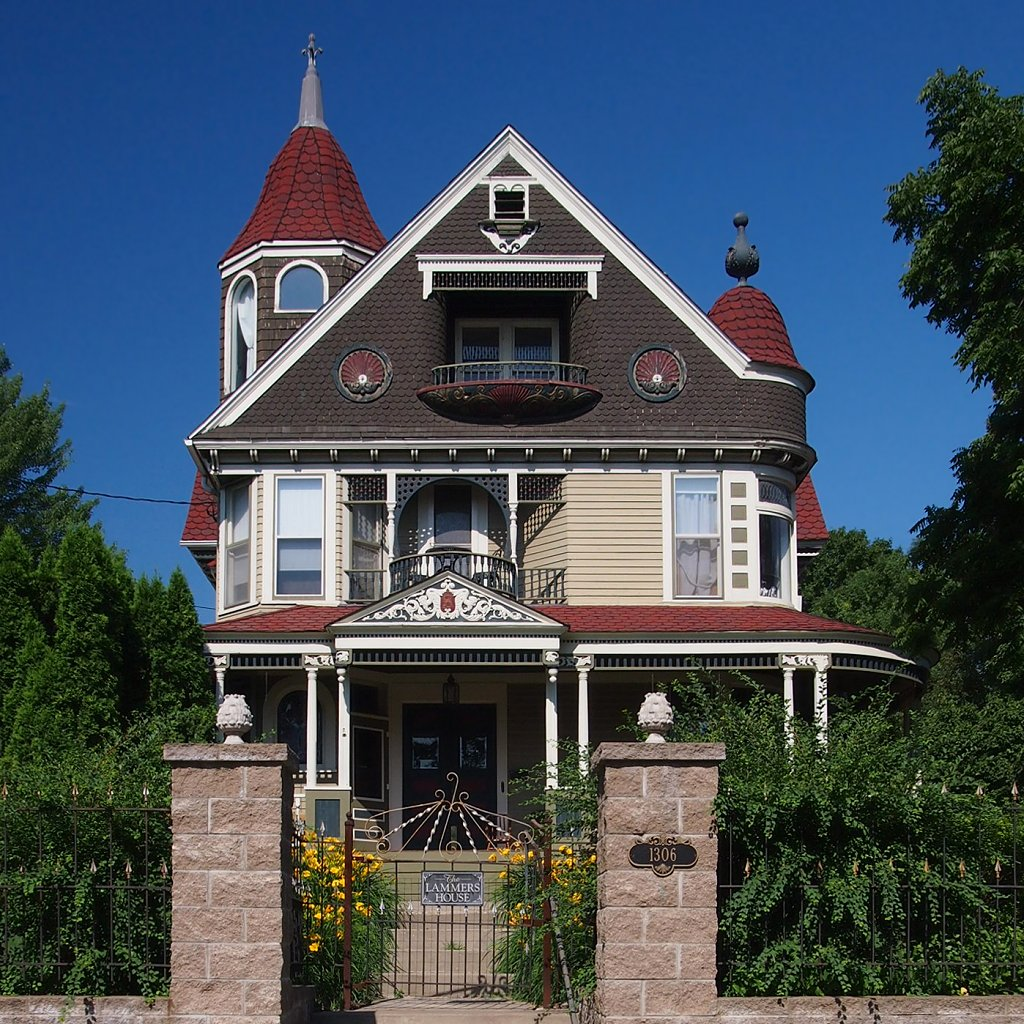
- The Albert Lammers House from the east

- Location within Minnesota Location within the United States
- Interactive map showing the location of Albert Lammers House
- Location: 1306 South 3rd Street, Stillwater, Minnesota
- Coordinates: 45°2′39.7″N 92°48′24″W
- Area: Less than one acre
- Built: c. 1893
- Architectural style: Queen Anne
- MPS: Washington County MRA
- NRHP reference No.: 82003076
- Designated NRHP: April 20, 1982

The Albert Lammers House is a historic house in Stillwater, Minnesota, United States, built circa 1893. It was listed on the National Register of Historic Places in 1982 for having local significance in the themes of architecture and industry. It was nominated for its association with a local family that expanded Stillwater's lumber interests into northwest Minnesota, and as the city's leading example of Queen Anne architecture.

== Description ==
The Albert Lammers House is a two-and-a-half-story wood-frame building on a prominent corner lot. Queen Anne architectural elements include the massing, turrets, wraparound porch, woodworking detail on the gables, ornamented roofline, and surface texturing. The house boasts an octagonal turret on the south and a round turret on the northeast corner. The complex front façade has recessed balconies on both the second and attic levels. The lower balcony has a latticework frieze while the upper has a seashell motif in its shape and flanking cartouches. Much of the detailed woodworking was done by Scandinavian carpenters, which may explain the Viking-style ornamentation on the roofline.

== History ==
Albert Lammers was born in Minnesota and married Emma Kroon in 1882. He spent decades in the lumber business with his brother George. Primed by their success in Minnesota's initial logging region—the St. Croix Valley—lumbermen like the Lammers Brothers and Isaac Staples were instrumental in expanding the industry to other parts of the state. In 1898 the Lammers' operation cut 150,000,000 feet (46,000,000 m) of lumber from the Red Lake Indian Reservation and transported it to sawmills in Crookston in northwest Minnesota. The Lammers didn't operate their own sawmills but contracted to cut and bark logs for other companies.

Several of the early lumbermen in the valley were motivated to build elaborate, monumental houses to boast of their success in industry. Besides the Albert Lammers House, other houses of industry pioneers include the Roscoe Hersey House, the Captain Austin Jenks House, and the Ivory McKusick House. These houses are also listed on the National Register.

As the Minnesota pineries became depleted, Albert Lammers traveled extensively, visiting his logging camps and searching for new business opportunities. He helped establish logging operations in South Carolina, Florida, and the Bahamas, and also diversified into mining.

Albert and Emma Lammers had four children. She died in 1910. Albert Lammers died in 1920 while in British Columbia, still attending to his lumber empire. Since the 1950s, Lammers House has been a rented residential property.

== See also ==
- National Register of Historic Places listings in Washington County, Minnesota
