= Roscoe Hersey House =

Historic house in Minnesota, United States

- U.S. National Register of Historic Places
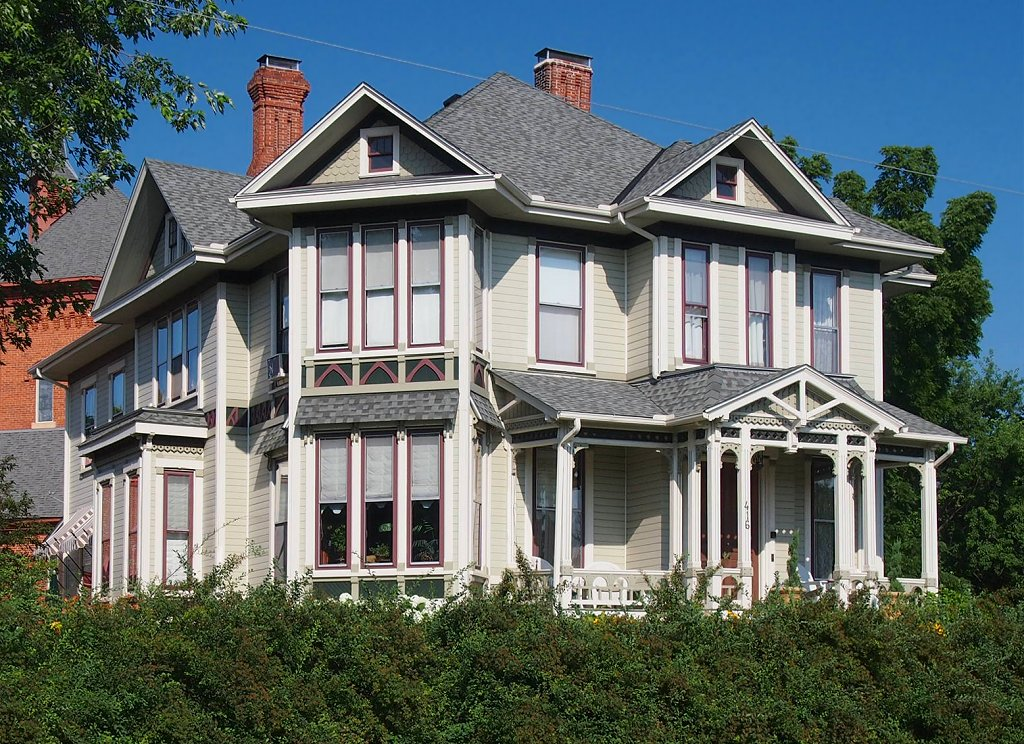
- The Roscoe Hersey House from the east

- Location within Minnesota Location within the United States
- Interactive map showing the location of Roscoe Hersey House
- Location: 416 South 4th Street, Stillwater, Minnesota
- Coordinates: 45°3′9″N 92°48′33″W
- Area: Less than one acre
- Built: 1879–80
- Architect: George W. Orff, George Low
- Architectural style: Eastlake/Queen Anne
- MPS: Washington County MRA
- NRHP reference No.: 82003084
- Designated NRHP: February 19, 1982

The Roscoe Hersey House is a historic house in Stillwater, Minnesota, United States, built 1879–1880. It was designed by architect George W. Orff in a mix of Eastlake and early Queen Anne style. Roscoe Hersey (?1841–1906) was a key figure in Stillwater's lumber and mercantile development, the son and local representative of Isaac Staples' Maine-based business partner Samuel F. Hersey. The house was listed on the National Register of Historic Places in 1982 for having local significance in the themes of architecture, commerce, and industry. It was nominated for its embodiment of the commercial success of the Hersey–Staples partnership, the ties between the St. Croix Valley and Bangor, Maine, and the peak of Stillwater's lumber industry.

== Description ==
The Roscoe Hersey House is an irregular wood-frame building with 18 rooms. Besides its elaborate exterior decoration, its dominant feature are four two-story bays projecting from the north, east, and south elevations and the southeast corner. The house originally rose to another half-story, with the east bay above the main entrance extending into a three-and-a-half-story belvedere tower, but the building's upper reaches were destroyed in a 1926 fire, after which the roofline was restructured in its present configuration.

The house's decorative woodwork was made possible by the advent of machine production. Embellishments include friezes beneath the second-story windows and above the porches, scrolled brackets, and fluted columns.

== History ==
Maine natives Samuel Hersey and Isaac Staples formed the firm of Hersey, Staples and Company in 1851 to harvest the rich pineries of the St. Croix Valley. With Hersey based at home in Bangor and Staples in charge of local operations, the firm grew into the largest timberland owner in the region, operator of a leading sawmill, and partner in other commercial endeavors.

Samuel Hersey's eldest son, Roscoe, served in the 1st Maine Heavy Artillery Regiment during the Civil War. Severely wounded at the Battle of Spotsylvania Court House, Roscoe Hersey mustered out at the rank of colonel. In 1867 the younger Hersey moved to Minnesota with his wife Eva to look after the family's business interests there. Initially managing the firm's Lake City branch, he relocated to Stillwater in 1872 and partnered into the company of Hersey, Bean and Brown. In 1878 he served one term as a state senator.

Seeking to build a residence to befit their station, the Herseys purchased three adjacent lots in May 1879, and their grand home was completed the following year. Several of the early lumbermen in Stillwater were motivated to build elaborate, monumental houses to boast of their success in industry. Besides the Roscoe Hersey House, other houses of industry pioneers include the Captain Austin Jenks House, the Albert Lammers House, and the Ivory McKusick House. These houses are also listed on the National Register. The Herseys only lived in this home for seven years, selling it in 1887 to move to Cathedral Hill, Saint Paul. Successive later owners John G. Nelson and James E. McGrath were both lumbermen as well.

== See also ==
- National Register of Historic Places listings in Washington County, Minnesota
