= Ivory McKusick House =

Historic house in Minnesota, United States

- U.S. National Register of Historic Places
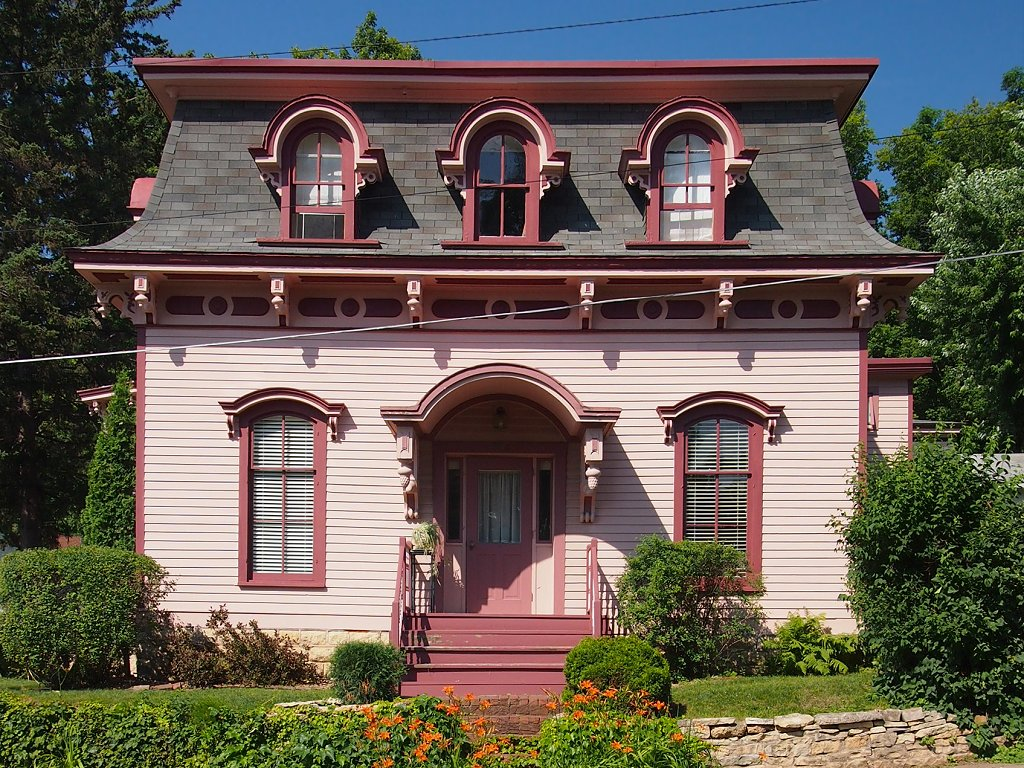
- The Ivory McKusick House from the east-northeast

- Location within Minnesota Location within the United States
- Interactive map showing the location of Ivory McKusick House
- Location: 504 North 2nd Street, Stillwater, Minnesota
- Coordinates: 45°3′36.8″N 92°48′33.7″W
- Area: Less than one acre
- Built: 1866/1872
- Architectural style: Second Empire
- MPS: Washington County MRA (AD)
- NRHP reference No.: 82003077
- Designated NRHP: April 20, 1982

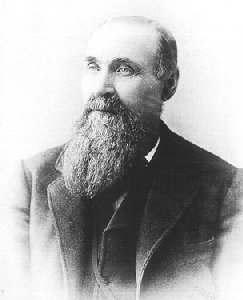
Ivory McKusick

The Ivory McKusick House is a historic house in Stillwater, Minnesota, United States, completed in 1872 for Ivory McKusick (1827–1906). It was listed on the National Register of Historic Places in 1982 for having local significance in the themes of architecture and commerce. It was nominated as a striking example of Second Empire architecture in the region and for its associations with a notable family in early Stillwater. McKusick had built his wealth via the lumber industry and government contracts during the Civil War. His older brother John had helped establish the first sawmill in the vicinity in 1843, named and platted the community that grew around it after his hometown in Maine, and served as its first mayor.

== Description ==
The official National Register documentation for the Ivory McKusick House gives a construction date of 1868. However more recent research from the Washington County Historical Society states that the house began as a one-story structure in 1866 and was enlarged in 1872 with the two-story wing that now serves as the main façade. Second Empire architectural elements include the mansard roof with round-arched dormers, and numerous ornate brackets. These brackets adorn the window hoods on the dormers and the first floor, while even larger brackets with pendants support the wide eaves and the hood over the front door. The heavy mansard roof was highly fashionable at the time. A patterned frieze wraps under the roofline and is echoed in decoration around a bay window on the side elevation. Decorative elements are simpler on the original rear wing and lacking altogether on a two-story servants' wing added to the northwest corner of the house sometime before 1888.

In his book Historic Homes of Minnesota, Roger G. Kennedy critiques the house as an example of a "strenuous and unsuccessful effort toward monumentality". In describing Minnesota's examples of Second Empire architecture, he said, "At its worst, it made small houses look like boys struggling to look out from beneath their fathers' hats."

== History ==
The McKusick family hailed from Maine, and eventually four brothers settled in Stillwater: John, Ivory, Jonathan, and Noah. John arrived first, in 1840, having traveled through Illinois, Iowa, and Wisconsin Territory seeking opportunities in the lumber industry. Finding a promising location on the west bank of the St. Croix River, he and three business partners opened a sawmill there in 1844. A town soon grew around the mill, heavily populated by other settlers from Maine.

Ivory McKusick arrived in 1847, initially working in John's mill and later independently. In 1854 he married his wife Sofia, with whom he had three children. In 1864 he left Stillwater and helped build Fort Wadsworth in Dakota Territory, returning the following year. In 1867 he was appointed Surveyor General for a section of Minnesota. Around this time he had his house built overlooking the St. Croix River. After 1875 Ivory McKusick had business interests in lumbering, warehousing, and the manufacture of farm implements.

Several of the early lumbermen in the valley were motivated to build elaborate, monumental houses to boast of their success in industry. Besides the Ivory McKusick House, other houses of industry pioneers include the Roscoe Hersey House, the Captain Austin Jenks House, and the Albert Lammers House. These houses are also listed on the National Register.

== See also ==
- National Register of Historic Places listings in Washington County, Minnesota
