= Offside (sport) =

Rule used by several different team sports

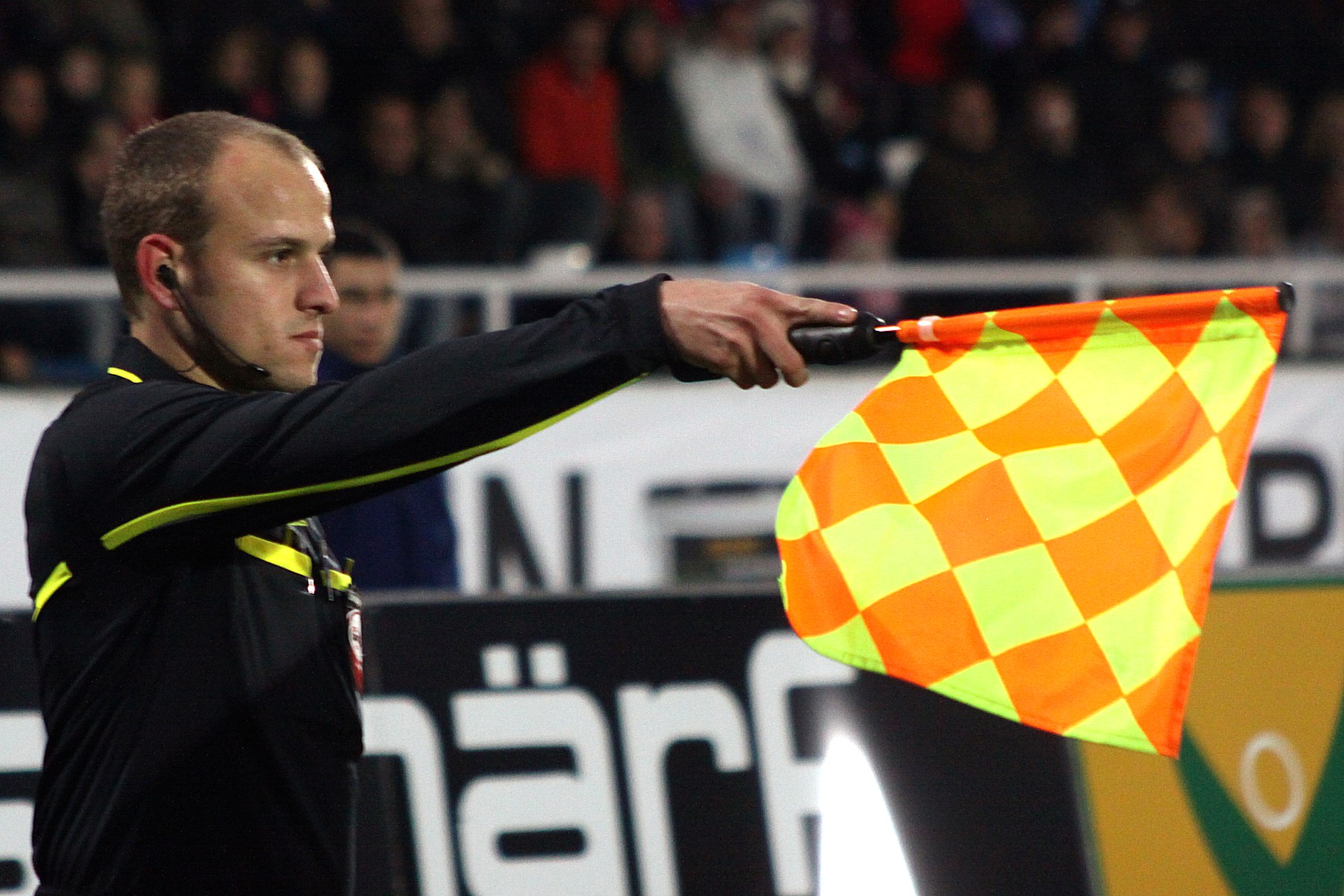
Referee Clemens Schüttengruber showing the position of an offside

The blue forward on the left of the diagram is in an offside position as he is in front of both the second-to-last defender (marked by the dotted line) and the ball. Note that this does not necessarily mean they are committing an offside offence.

Offside is a rule used by several different team sports regulating aspects of player positioning. It is particularly used in field sports with rules deriving from the various codes of football, such as association football, rugby union and rugby league, lacrosse variants and in similar hockey sports e.g. ice hockey, broomball, field hockey and bandy.

== Purpose of offside rules ==
Offside rules are generally designed to ensure that players play together as a team, and do not consistently position one or a few players near the opponent's goal ('goalhanging') to try to receive a "Hail Mary pass" for an easy goal without opposing players nearby. However, the application and enforcement of offside rules can be complicated, and can sometimes be confusing for new players as well as for spectators.

== History ==
The word "offside" comes from a military term for a man trapped behind enemy lines, where he is said to be "off the strength of his side". Offside rules date back to codes of football developed at English public schools in the early nineteenth century. These offside rules were often much stricter than in modern games. In some of them, a player was "off his side" if he were merely standing in front of the ball. This was similar to the current offside law in rugby, which penalizes any player between the ball and the opponent's goal. By contrast, the original Sheffield Rules had no offside rule, and players known as "kick throughs" were positioned permanently near the opponents' goal.

== Offside rules in different sports ==
- Football codes
  - Offside (American and Canadian football)
  - Offside (association football)
  - Offside (rugby)
- Hockey
  - Offside (bandy)
  - Offside (ice hockey)

See also:

- Offside (field hockey)—Historically a part of the sport, but officially abolished in 1998

== Notable sports without an offside rule ==
While most football and 'goal' sports have developed an offside rule, two codes, Australian rules football and Gaelic football, notably do not have one. A consequence in these sports, (and also hurling, camogie and basketball which have no such offside rule), is a strong tendency to tactical man-marking, where each player closely marks, and is marked by, his opposing number throughout the game.

Sports without an offside rule include:

- In football codes:
  - Australian rules football
  - Gaelic football and Hurling
  - 'Short-sided' versions of association football with fewer than 11 players a side, including futsal, beach soccer, five-a-side football, and indoor soccer
- Basketball and wheelchair basketball—with just five players, a team with one player significantly ahead of the opposing team can be easily scored against by the other team. However, some players and teams try this strategy, known as cherry picking, in an attempt to gain an advantage by scoring easy baskets, with varying degrees of success. There is also a three seconds rule which helps prevent players from lingering near the opposing basket, effectively creating a soft offside line around the key.
- Wheelchair rugby—similarly to wheelchair basketball, there are only four players per team, and an eight-second rule applies within the opponents' key.
- In hockey variants:
  - Field hockey since 1998.
  - Floorball
  - Ringette
  - Rinkball
- Net and wall sports:
  - Volleyball and tennis—the net acts as a barrier between the opposing teams or players. However, volleyball does have rules about which players can "spike" the ball (hit it downward when it is above net height) and where.
  - Squash and racquetball—opposing players are often very close to each other and a "let" may be called if a player interferes with an opposing player's ability to have a fair chance to hit the ball.

== Popular culture ==
In association football, a defence will often utilise a 'stepping out' tactic, moving forward in unison beyond the forward player and immediately alerting the referee by raising their arm, to catch an opposing forward offside, a movement known as 'springing the offside trap'. One team particularly known for their use of and skill in the tactic was the Arsenal F.C. of the late 1980s, referenced comedically in the movie The Full Monty when a group of novice male strippers struggling with choreography realise a key step replicates the Arsenal 'Back four springing the offside trap'. The captain of that Arsenal team, Tony Adams referenced both the tactic and the film when performing in the 2022 series of Strictly Come Dancing.
