= Holden Town Hall =

- U.S. National Register of Historic Places
- Location within Maine Location within the United States
- Location: 723 Main Rd., Holden, Maine
- Coordinates: 44°44′59″N 68°39′2″W
- Area: 0.3 acres (0.12 ha)
- Built: 1873
- Architectural style: Italianate; Stick style; Gothic Revival
- NRHP reference No.: 14000362
- Added to NRHP: June 27, 2014

Holden Town Hall is a historic civic and community building at 723 Main Road in Holden, Maine. Built in 1873, it is an architecturally distinctive blend of styles. The building served as town hall into the 1960s, and as the local Grange hall until 1995. It was listed on the National Register of Historic Places in 2014.

== Description and history ==
Holden Town Hall is located on Main Road (United States Route 1A), the principal thoroughfare through Holden, near the town's geographic center. It is located just west of the road's junction with Bagaduce Road, a principal road providing access to the northern part of town. The building is a tall 1-1/2 story wood frame structure, with a front-facing gable roof, original clapboard siding, and a recent (2009) concrete foundation; the latter is the result of the building have been moved back from the road about 200 feet (61 m). The foundation is edged with granite stones that formed its original foundation. The main facade, facing the street, is symmetrical, with a double-door entrance at the center, with flanking pilasters and a triangular transom window that has a cornice above. The flanking bays have sash windows, also topped by triangular cornices. In the attic level above the entrance are a pair of pointed-arch windows, again beneath a single triangular cornice. The eave of the roofline is decorated with jigsawn bargeboard trim. The building's interior retains all of its original hardware and fixtures, and provides two full stories, each with a large meeting space.

The building was constructed in 1873, and is one of the state's best-preserved examples of a late 19th-century municipal hall. The original designer's identity is unknown, but it may be the work of Bangor-based architect George W. Orff, since it stylistically resembles some of his other works. The building was where the town held its annual town meetings until about 1964, and continues to be used occasionally for civic functions such as smaller meetings and voting. It was also intended for use by the community for social events, a use that continues to this day. A local chapter of the Grange also used the hall between 1922 and 1995.

== See also ==
- National Register of Historic Places listings in Penobscot County, Maine
