= George W. Orff =

American architect (1835–1908)

- Born: March 3, 1835; Bangor, Maine, US
- Died: March 11, 1908 (aged 73); Bangor, Maine, US
- Occupation: Architect

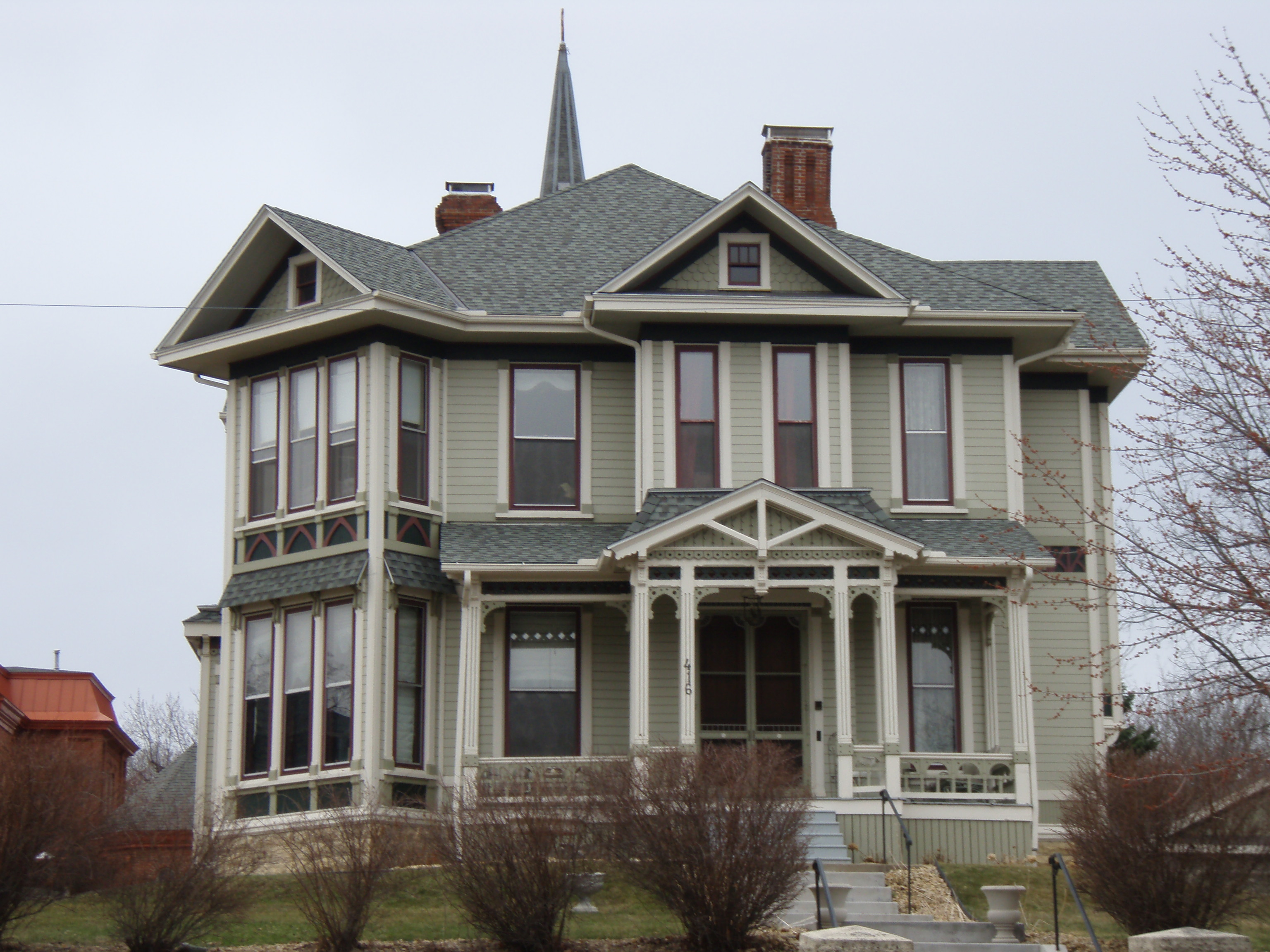
Roscoe Hersey House, in 2008

George W. Orff (March 3, 1835 – March 11, 1908), was an American architect of Bangor, Maine and Minnesota.

== Life and career ==
Orff was born March 3, 1835, in Bangor, Maine to Edward F. Orff and Sarah (Yates) Orff. He was educated in the public schools and trained as a carpenter. However, he had other ambitions and in 1861 went to Boston to train as an architect. He is believed to have studied with Calvin Ryder, a Maine native who designed several buildings in Bangor. In 1870, he returned to Bangor and established himself as an architect, practicing there for eight years. One of his first works, the Adams-Pickering Block in Bangor, is the largest surviving project in Maine. In winter 1878, he left Bangor and moved west, settling in Minneapolis in spring 1879. He was soon joined by his brother, Fremont D. Orff, who worked as a draftsman until they formed a partnership in 1881. In the 1880s and 1890s, they employed several talented designers, including Francis W. Fitzpatrick from 1888 to 1889 and Edgar E. Joralemon. In 1893, the partnership was expanded to include Joralemon. The Orff brothers and Joralemon practiced as Orff & Joralemon until the partnership was dissolved in 1897. Fremont D. Orff succeeded to the practice, with the elder Orff being appointed a superintendent of construction for the Minneapolis public schools. In c. 1905, Orff left Minneapolis and returned to his native Bangor, where he died in 1908.

== Personal life ==
Orff died March 11, 1908, in Bangor, Maine. His wife had died c. 1903 in Minneapolis. He was buried in Mount Hope Cemetery in Bangor.

== Legacy ==
A number of his works are listed on the United States National Register of Historic Places.

== Architectural works ==
- Old Town Town Hall, Old Town, Maine (1870–71, demolished)
- Adams-Pickering Block, Bangor, Maine (1871, NRHP 1974)
- House for Samuel Kidder Whiting, (Note: Attributed to Orff on stylistic grounds.) Ellsworth, Maine (1871, NRHP 1983)
- Holden Town Hall, Holden, Maine (1873, NRHP 2014)
- Orono Town Hall, Orono, Maine (1873–74, burned 1891)
- Double house for George W. Orff and George J. Poole, Bangor, Maine (1874)
- House for Taylor Durgin, Bangor, Maine (1874)
- House for Jones P. Veazie, Bangor, Maine (1874–75, NRHP 1988)
- Emerson Block, Bangor, Maine (1875, demolished)
- Hatch Block, Bangor, Maine (1875, demolished)
- Bank Block, Dexter, Maine (1876, NRHP 1999)
- Batchelder-Mitchell Block, Bangor, Maine (1876, demolished)
- House for James A. Robinson, Bangor, Maine (1878)
- House for Roscoe Hersey, Stillwater, Minnesota (1879–80, NRHP 1982)
- Pioneer Block, (Note: A contributing property to the Water Street Historic District, listed on the National Register of Historic Places in 2007.) Eau Claire, Wisconsin (1882, NRHP 1980)
- Panama Flats, St. Paul, Minnesota (1886)
- Mutual Block, Minneapolis, Minnesota (1888 et seq., demolished)
- Athletic Park, Minneapolis, Minnesota (1889, demolished 1901)
- House for George W. Van Dusen, (Note: The design is attributed to Edgar E. Joralemon, the Orff Brothers' chief designer.) Minneapolis, Minnesota (1891–93, NRHP 1995)
- House for Edmund G. Walton, Minneapolis, Minnesota (1892, demolished 1959)
- North Dakota Soldiers' Home, Lisbon, North Dakota (1892–93, demolished)
- House for John E. Lockwood, Minneapolis, Minnesota (1893)
- Bayfield County Courthouse, Washburn, Wisconsin (1894–96, NRHP 1975)
- Waseca County Courthouse, Waseca, Minnesota (1896–97, NRHP 1982)

== Gallery of architectural works ==
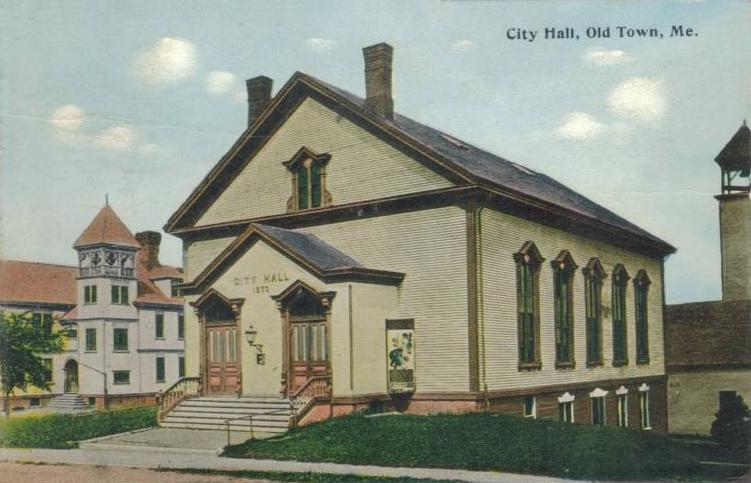
Old Town Town Hall, Old Town, Maine, 1870–71.

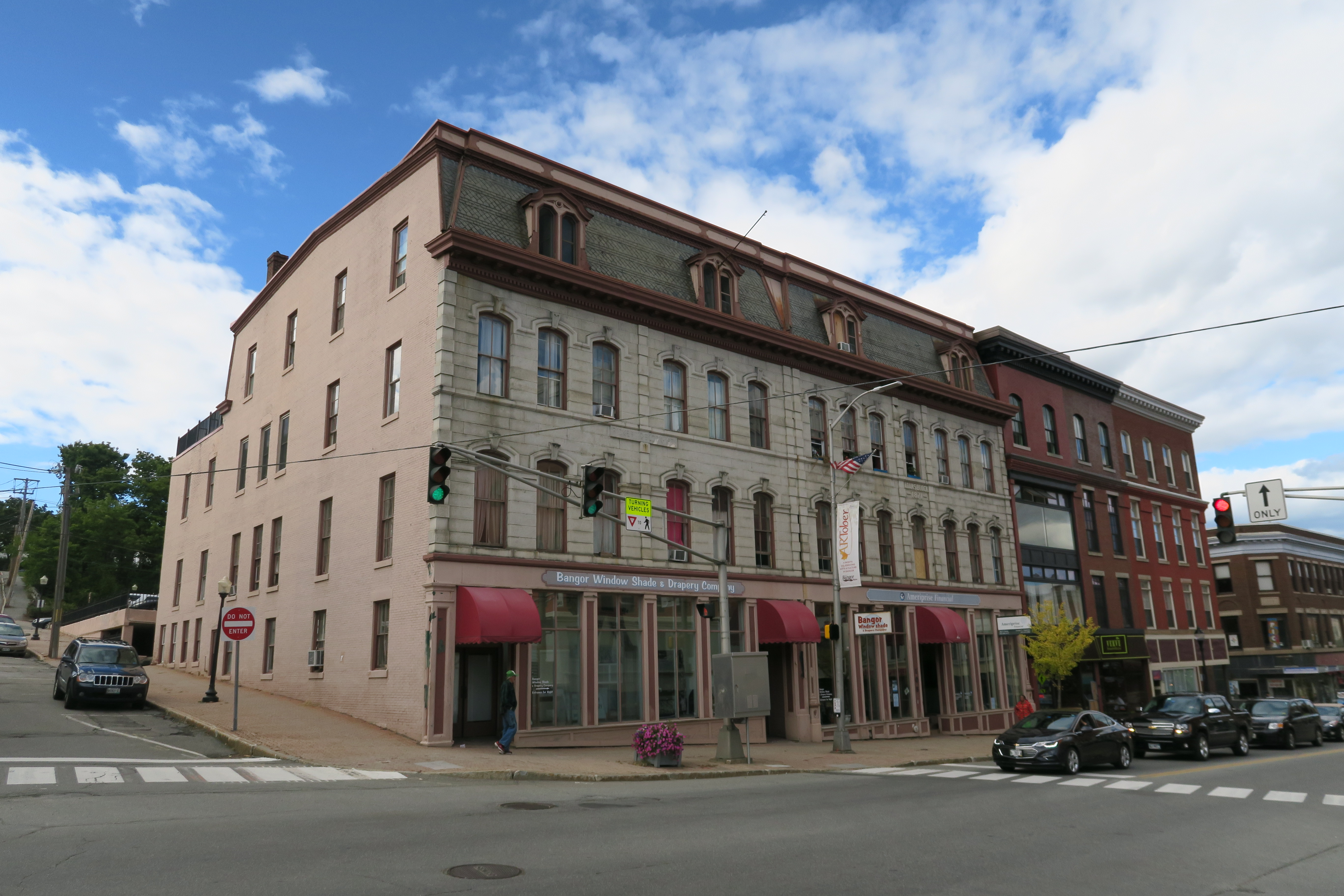
Adams-Pickering Block, Bangor, Maine, 1871.

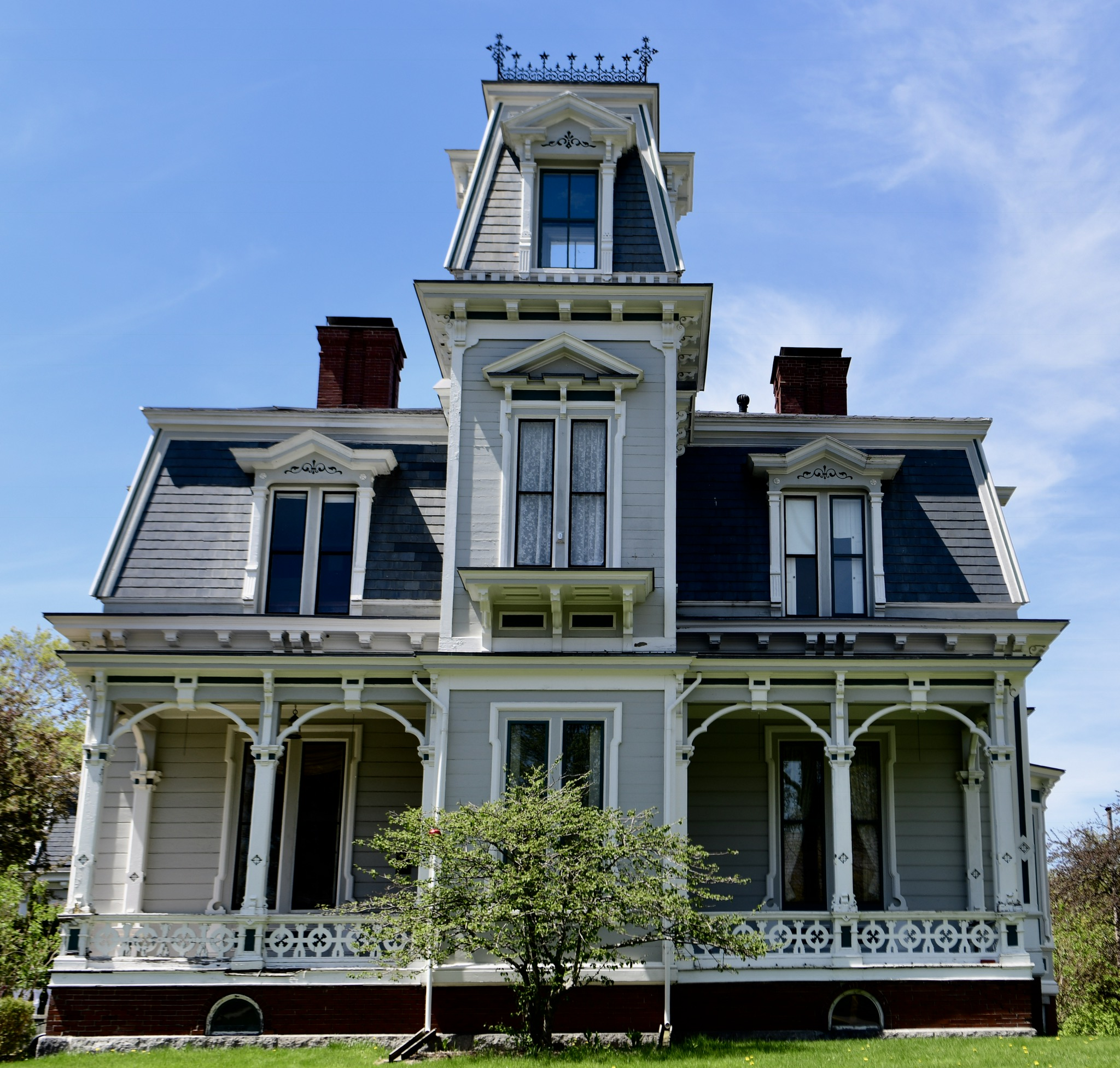
House for Jones P. Veazie, Bangor, Maine, 1874–75.

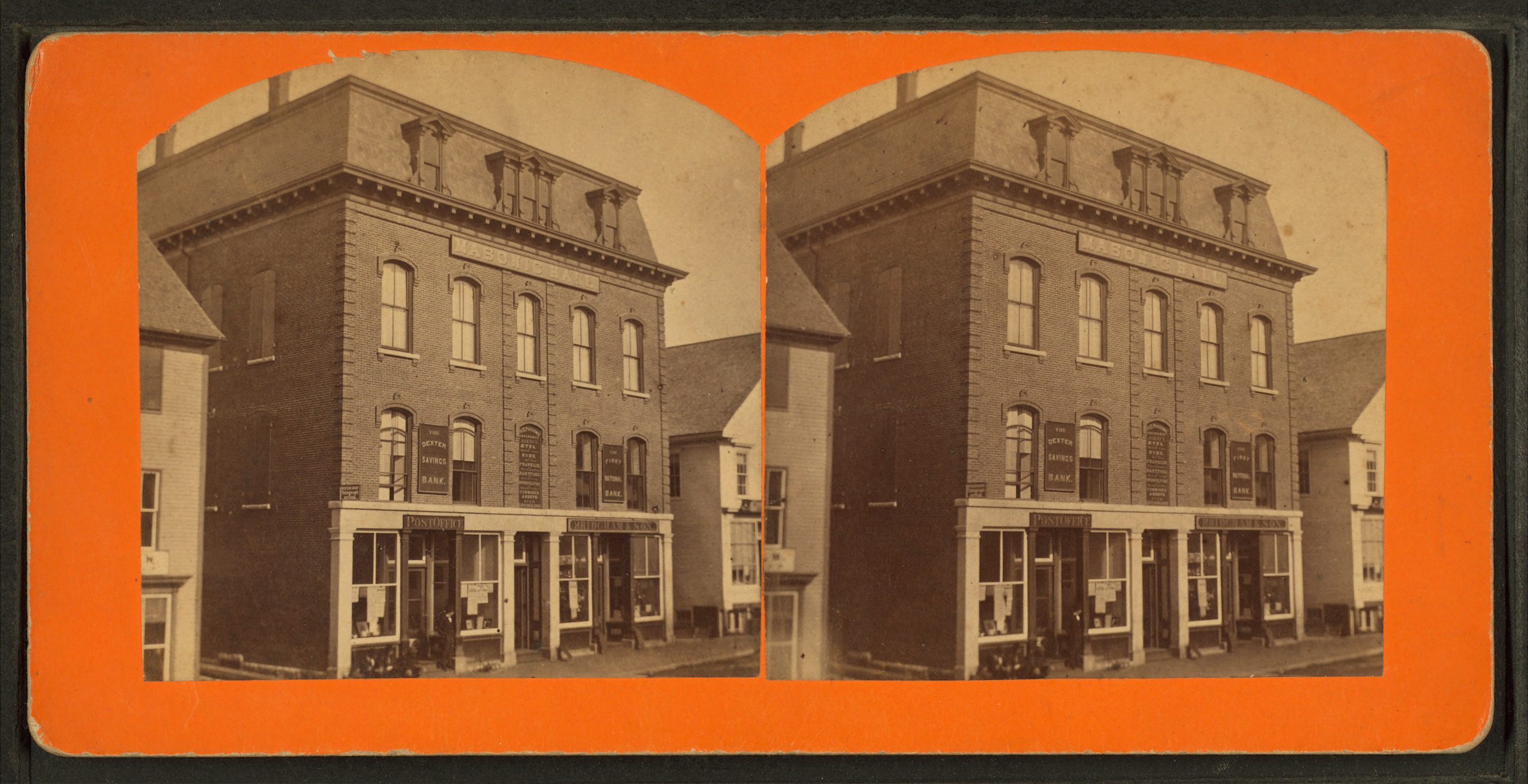
Bank Block, Dexter, Maine, 1876.

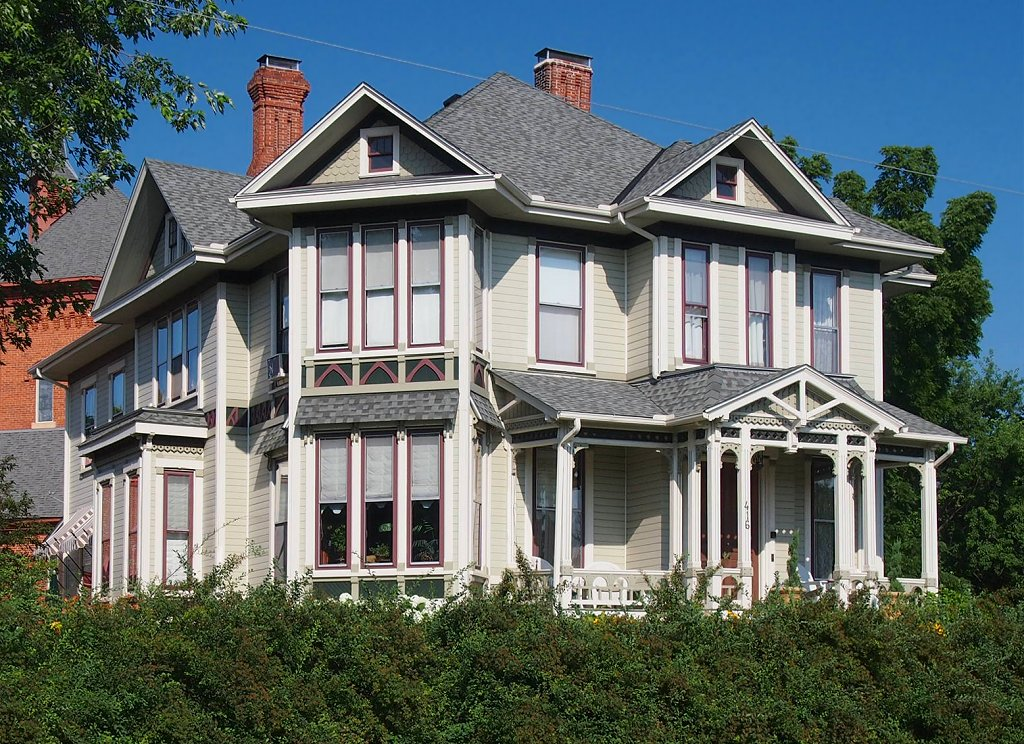
House for Roscoe Hersey, Stillwater, Minnesota, 1879–80.

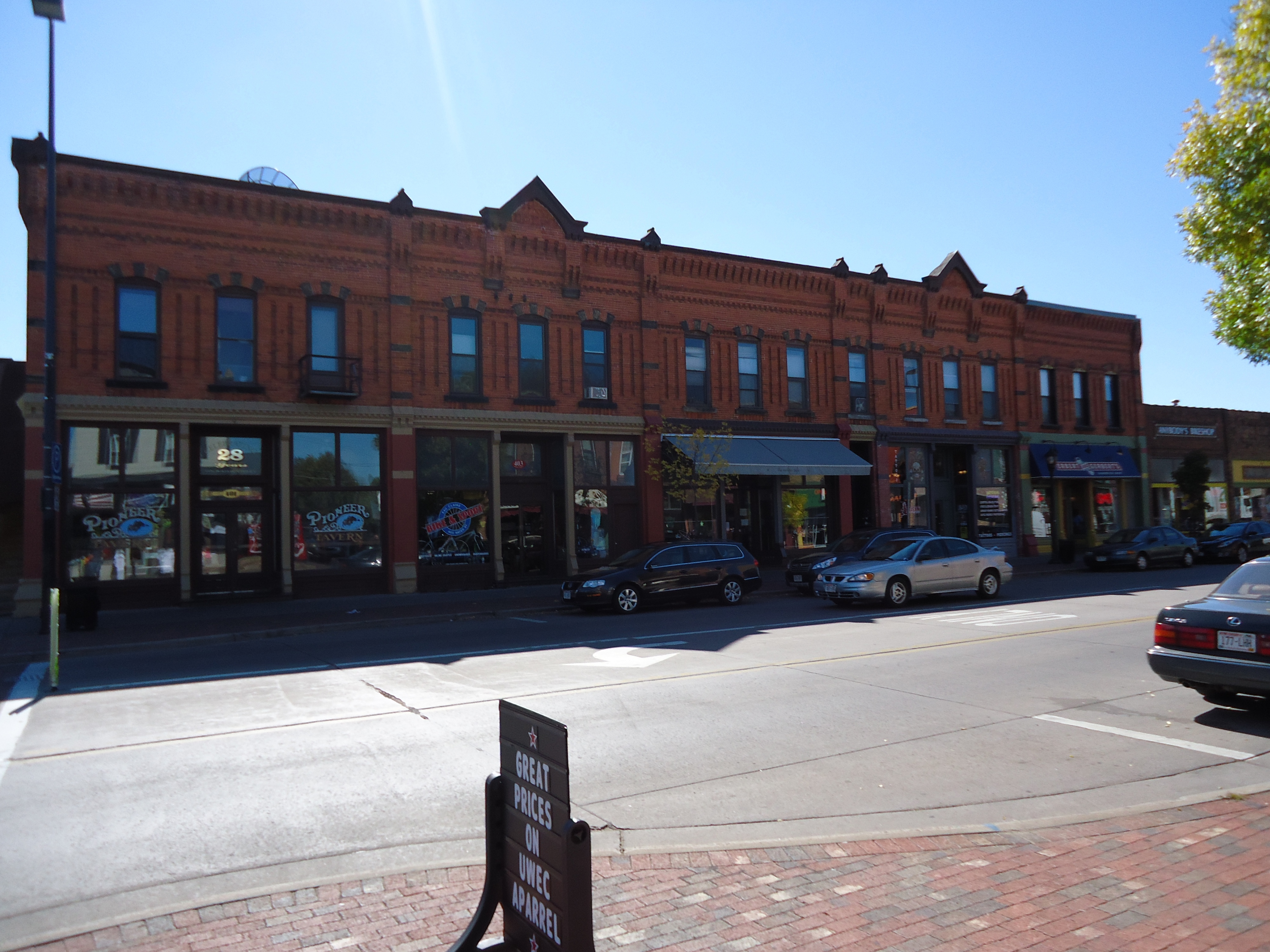
Pioneer Block, Eau Claire, Wisconsin, 1882.

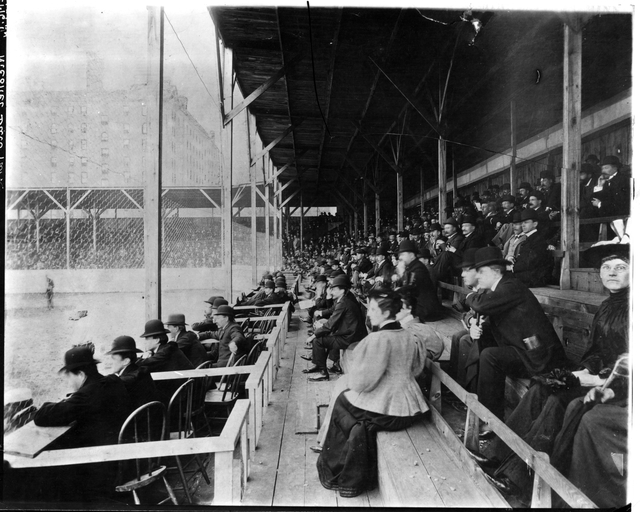
Athletic Park, Minneapolis, Minnesota, 1889.

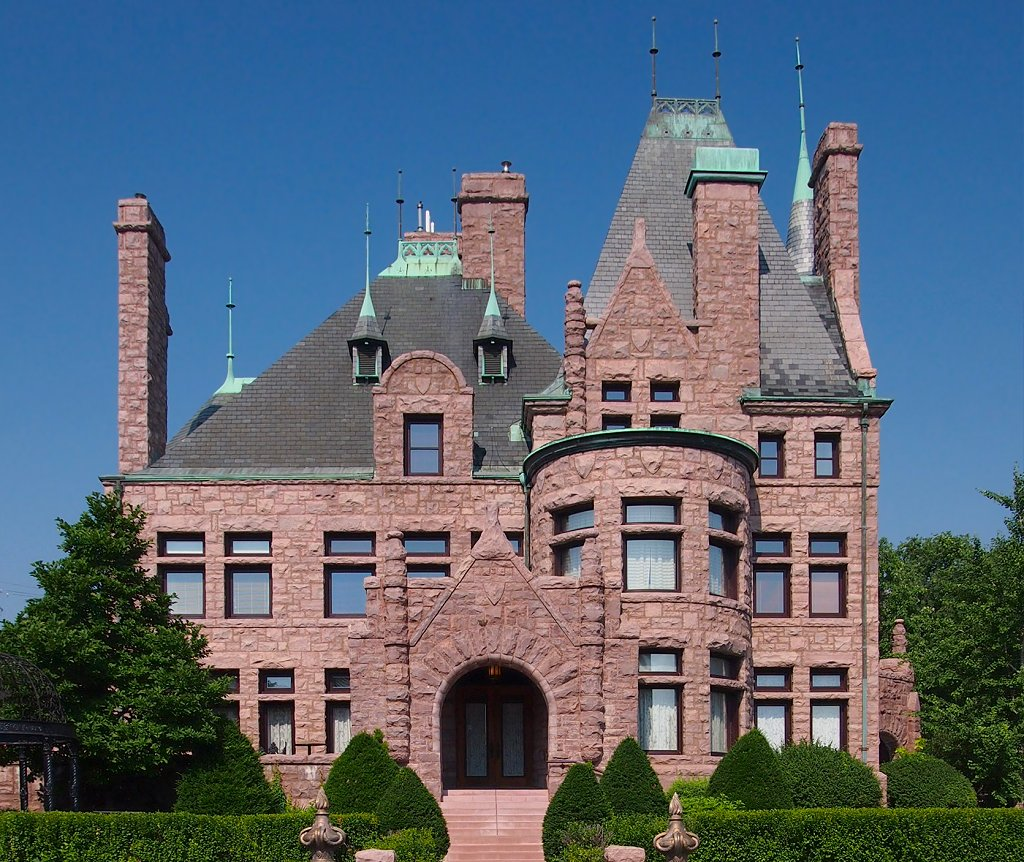
House for George W. Van Dusen, Minneapolis, Minnesota, 1891–93.

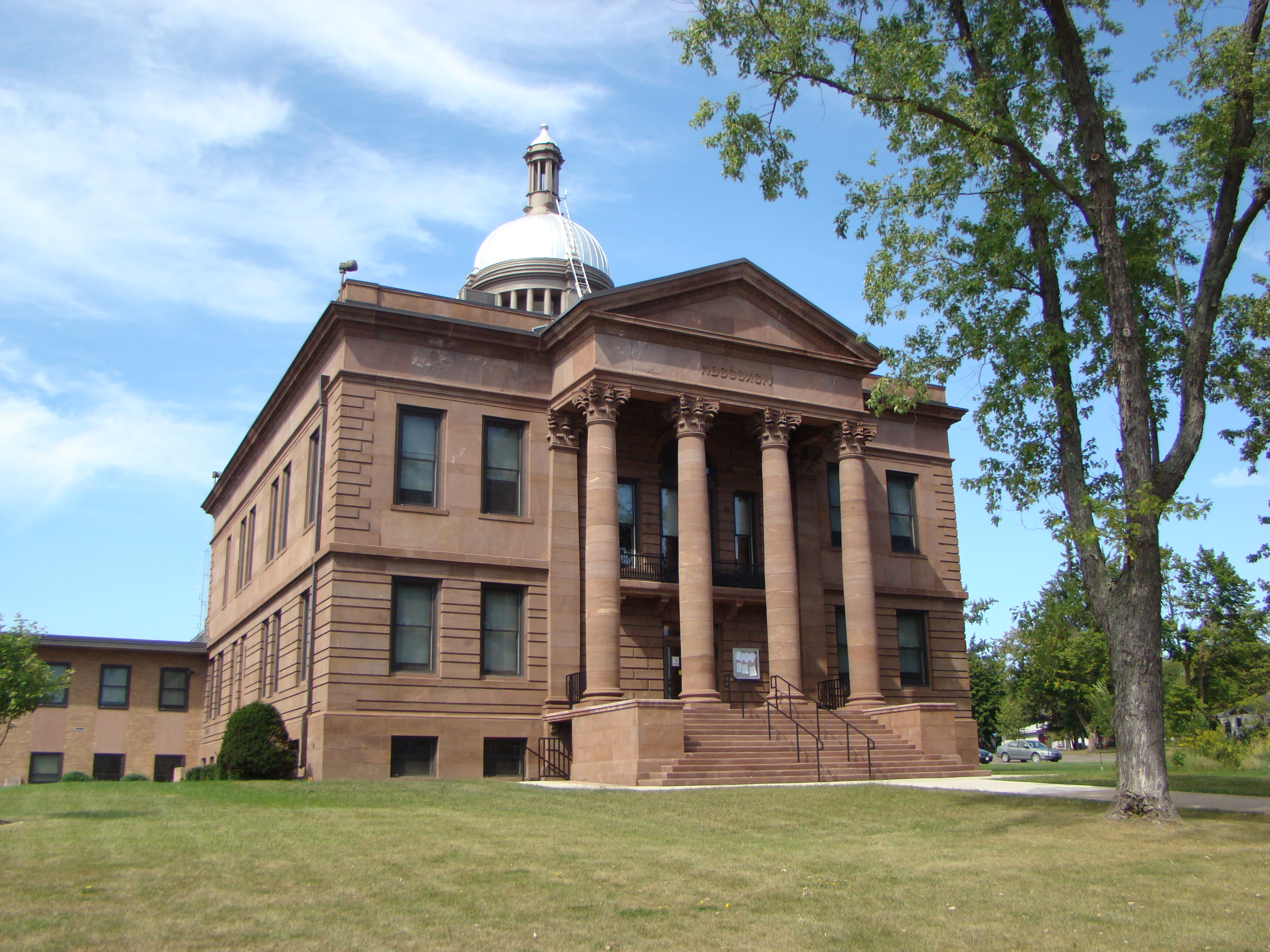
Bayfield County Courthouse, Washburn, Wisconsin, 1894–96.

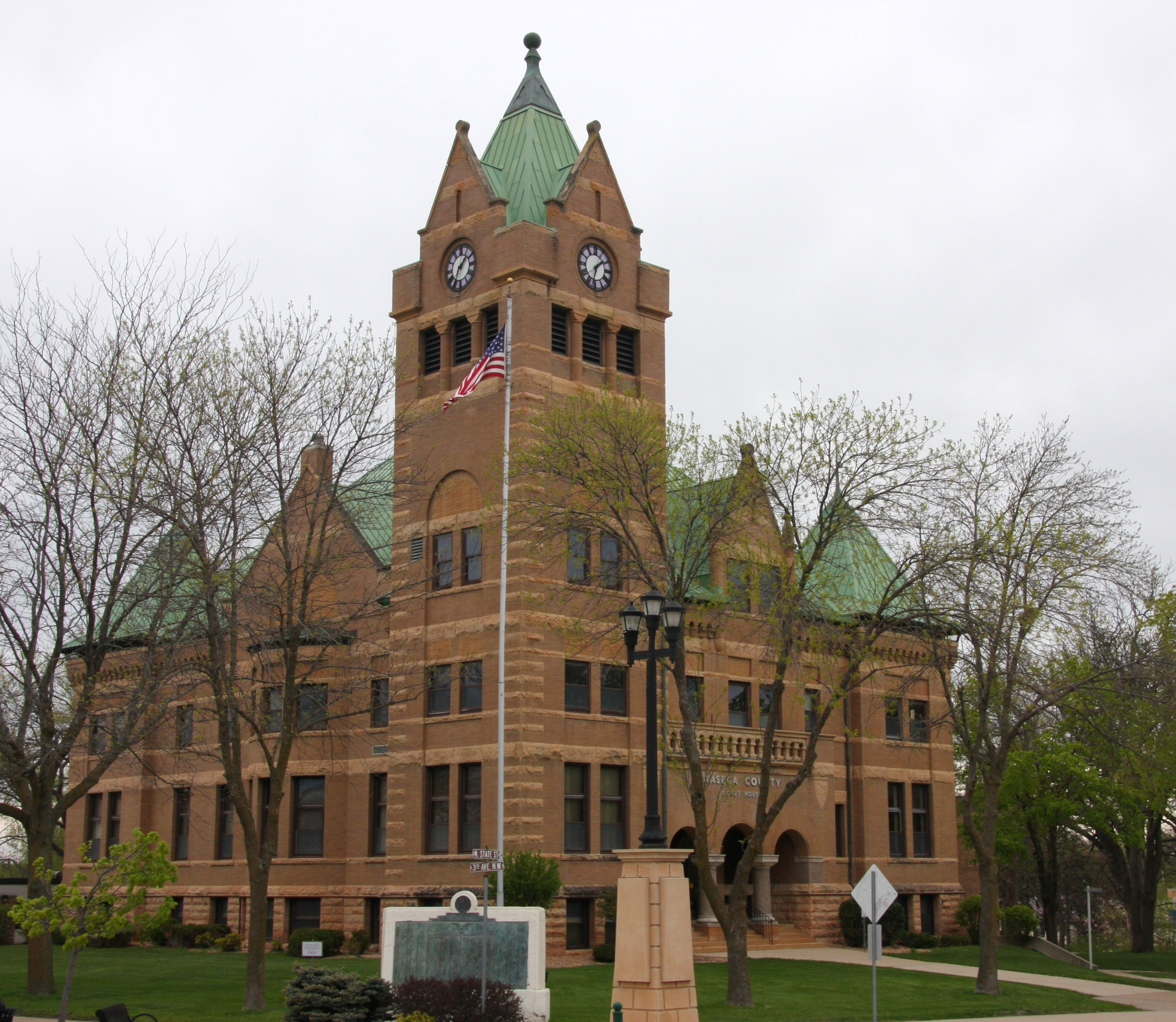
Waseca County Courthouse, Waseca, Minnesota, 1896–97.
