= Adams-Pickering Block =

- U.S. National Register of Historic Places
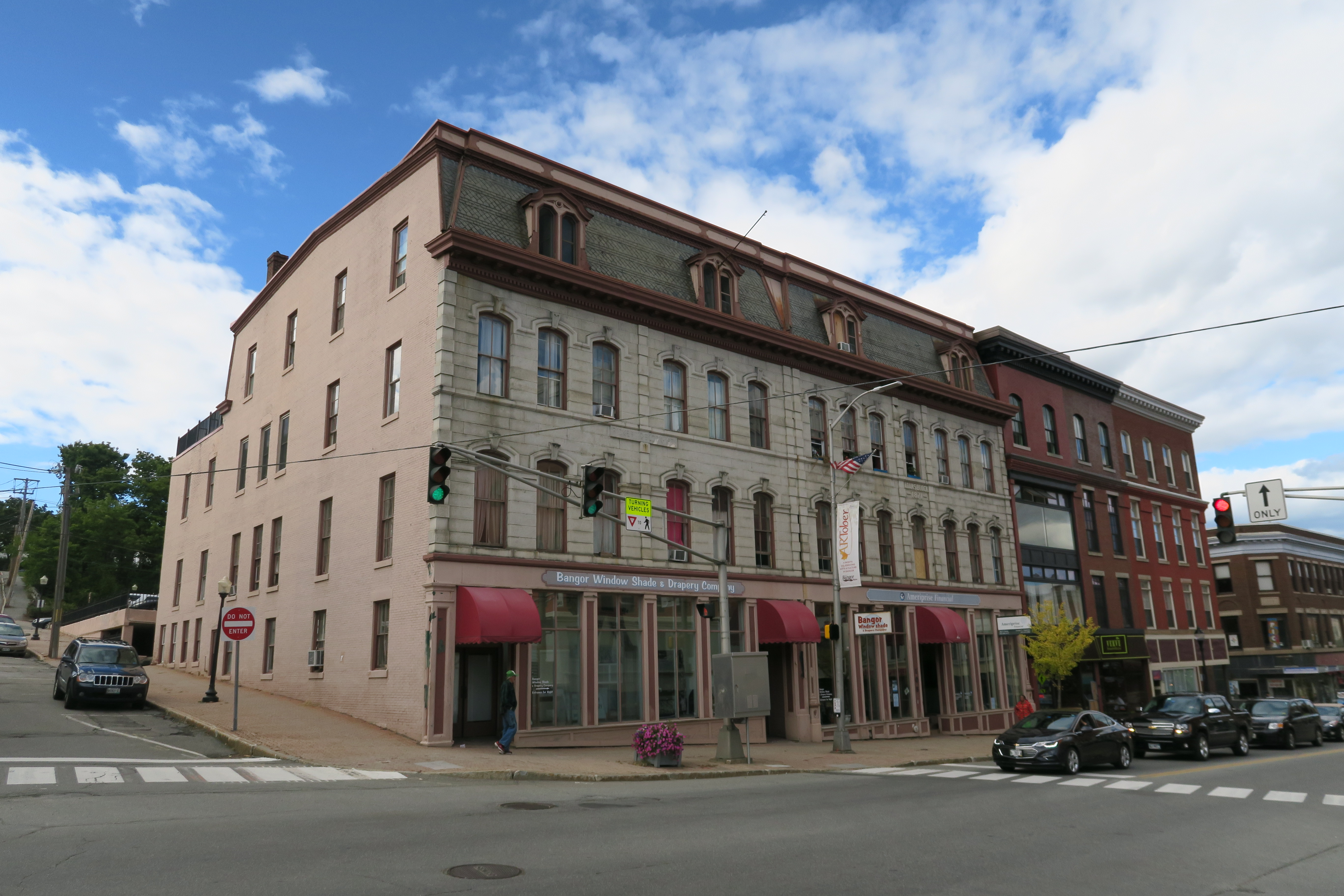

- Location within Maine Location within the United States
- Location: Corner of Main and Middle Sts., Bangor, Maine
- Coordinates: 44.7998°N 68.7723°W
- Built: 1871
- Architect: Orff, George W.
- Architectural style: Late Victorian
- NRHP reference No.: 74000184
- Added to NRHP: May 2, 1974

The Adams-Pickering Block is a historic commercial building at Main and Middle Streets in Bangor, Maine. Built in 1873, it is one of the major surviving works of local architect George W. Orff in the city, and one of the few of the period to survive Bangor's Great Fire of 1911.

== Description and history ==
The Adams-Pickering Block is located in central Bangor, just south of West Market Square, at the northwest corner of Main and Middle Streets. It is a four-story, Second Empire-style building, which is distinctive for its granite facade, cast iron trim, and mansard roof. The Pickering Block, at the corner with Middle Street, is six bays wide, while the Adams Block, to its right, is seven. Windows on the second and third floors are set in segmented-arch openings, with decorative key-stoned hoods. When built in 1871, its ground floor had mostly cast iron elements, but the storefronts have been modernized, and only fragments of the original trim remain.

The twin blocks were built in 1871 to a design by Bangor native architect George W. Orff, and was built on the site of "The Main Street Fire" of 1872, which killed one and injured 8. It was one of a number of high-profile commissions Orff executed in downtown Bangor in those years, of which this is a rare survivor of both the Great Fire of 1911 and urban renewal of the 1960s. The building was one of the largest local commissions for Orff, who subsequently migrated to Minnesota.

George W. Pickering (1799-1876) was a prominent local merchant and President of the Kenduskeag Bank (incorporated 1847). His maternal grandfather Jacob Dennett was one of the original settlers of Bangor, part of a group which arrived in 1771. Pickering was also the 12th Mayor of Bangor (1853–54), and Vice President of the Bangor Theological Seminary. Pickering Square in Downtown Bangor is named for him. According to historian James Vickery he "was called the best businessman in Bangor by his contemporaries"

It was listed on the National Register of Historic Places on May 2, 1974.

== See also ==
- National Register of Historic Places listings in Penobscot County, Maine
