= Bank Block =

- U.S. National Register of Historic Places
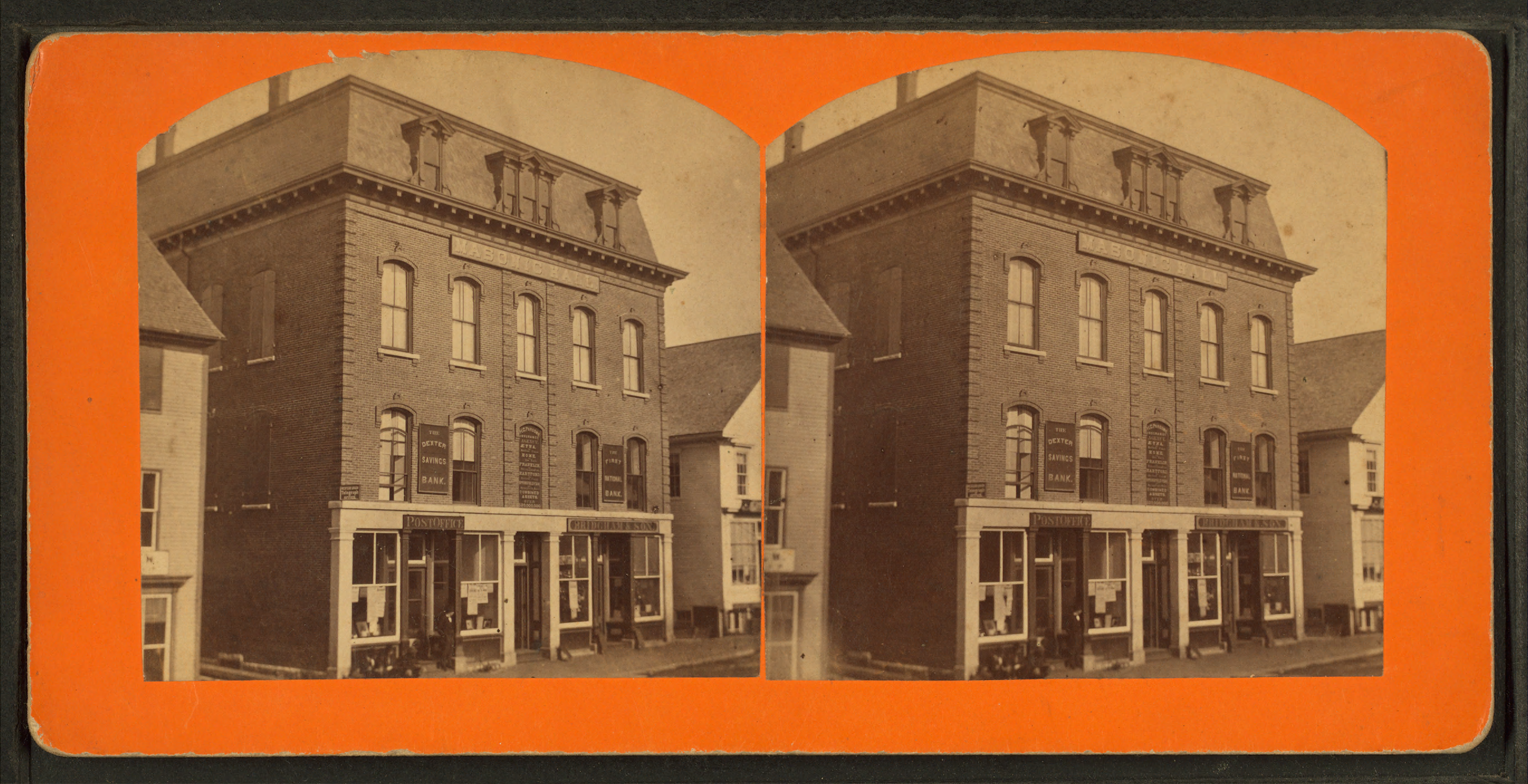
- Bank block, Dexter, Maine

- Location within Maine Location within the United States
- Location: 15 Main St., Dexter, Maine
- Coordinates: 45°1′28″N 69°17′29″W
- Area: less than one acre
- Built: 1876
- Built by: Henry P. Dexter
- Architect: George W. Orff
- Architectural style: Italianate, Romanesque
- NRHP reference No.: 99000375
- Added to NRHP: March 25, 1999

The Bank Block is a historic commercial building at 15 Main Street in Dexter, Maine. Built in 1876 for two local banks, with a new fourth floor added in 1896, it is a significant local example of Italianate and Romanesque architecture, designed by Bangor architect George W. Orff. It was listed on the National Register of Historic Places in 1999.

== Description and history ==
The Bank Block is located in the heart of Dexter's central business district, on the north side of Main Street (Maine State Route 23). It is a four-story masonry structure, with brick upper floors and ground floor retail spaces of glass, granite and metal. The ground floor is seven bays wide, articulated by a combination of iron and stone pilasters. Entrances are in the leftmost bay and the central bay, set in paneled recesses, and the remaining bays have glass display windows. The pilasters support a granite lintel, above which the brick portion of the building rises. The upper floors are five bays wide, with brick quoining at the corners and flanking the central bay. Second and third floor windows are set in segmented-arch openings, with Italianate brick hoods and bracketed stone sills. The fourth floor is separated from the others by a brick stringcourse, and has tripled round-arch Romanesque windows in the outer two bays, and a single round-arch window in the center bay. The cornice consists of corbelled brickwork.

The Bank Block was built in 1876 as a joint project by the Dexter Savings Bank (founded 1867) and the First National Bank (1875). The ground floor was dedicated to retail space, the second floor to the offices of the two banks, and the upper floors housed the local Masonic lodge. Designed by Bangor architect George W. Orff, the top floor was originally mansarded in the Second Empire style, with gabled dormers. The Masonic facilities were gutted by a fire in early 1896, and the upper portion of the building was subsequently rebuilt to a design by Henry Dexter, a local builder. The building housed banks until the mid-1990s.

== See also ==
- National Register of Historic Places listings in Penobscot County, Maine
