= Jones P. Veazie House =

Historic house in Maine, United States

- U.S. National Register of Historic Places
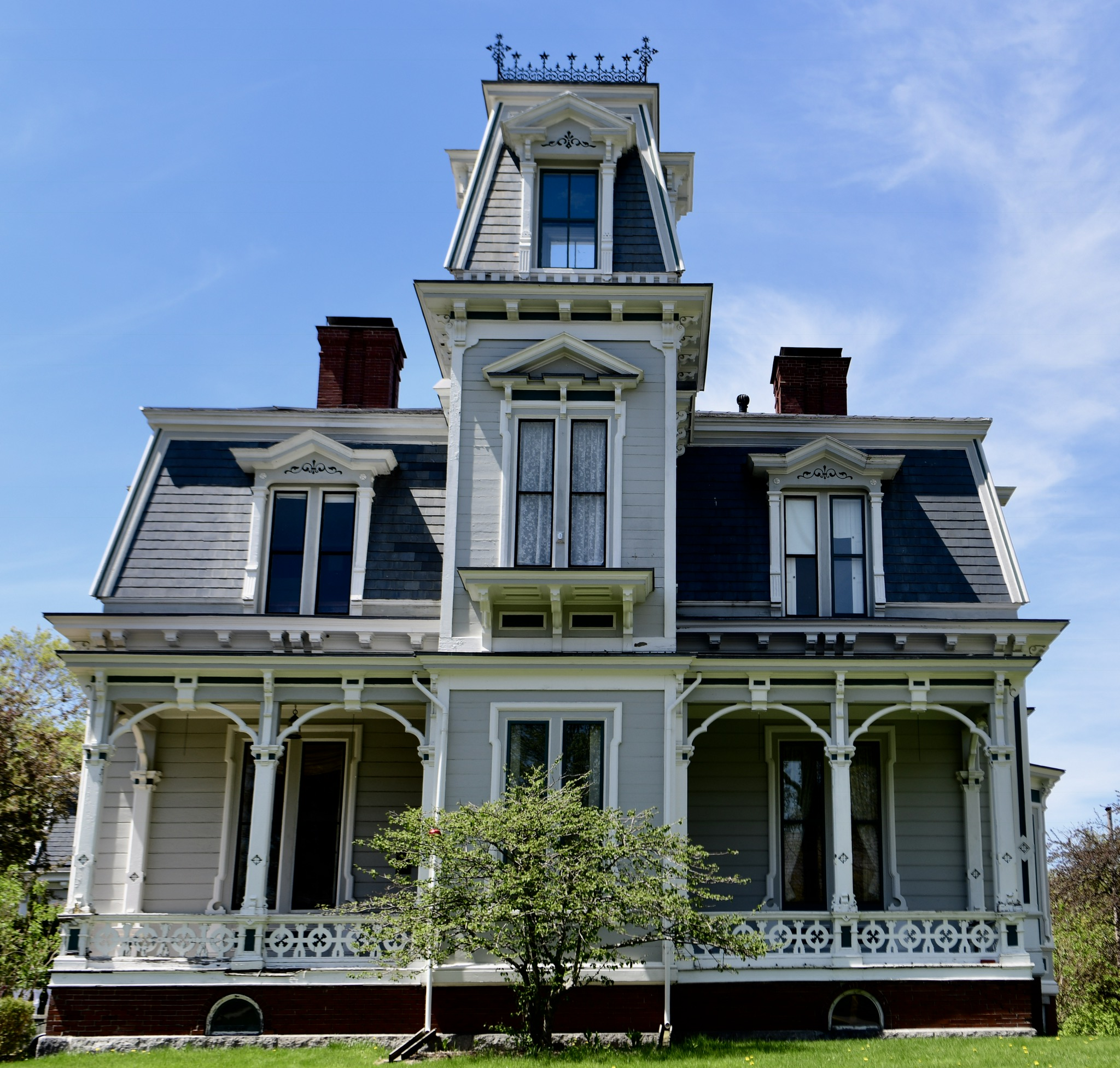

- Location within Maine Location within the United States
- Location: 88 Fountain St. Bangor, Maine
- Coordinates: 44.8127°N 68.7768°W
- Area: 1 acre (0.40 ha)
- Built: 1874
- Architect: George W. Orff
- Architectural style: Second Empire
- NRHP reference No.: 88000890
- Added to NRHP: June 23, 1988

The Jones P. Veazie House is a historic house at 88 Fountain Street in Bangor, Maine. Built in 1874–75, it is one of a small number of works of Bangor native George W. Orff to survive in the state, and is one of its finest examples of Second Empire architecture. It was listed on the National Register of Historic Places in 1988.

== Description and history ==
The Veazie House is set on the west side of Fountain Street, in a residential area north of Bangor's central business district. It is a 1 1/2-story wood-frame structure, finished in flushboarded siding, and with a mansard roof. A 2 1/2-story tower, topped by a mansard roof with iron cresting, projects from the center of the south-facing facade. The tower is flanked on the first floor by porches extending to the sides of the house. The porch features a low elaborately-jigsawn balustrade, and brackets that are longer than those typical for the style. The corners of the house have paneled pilasters, and the main roof's cornice is irregularly studded with brackets. The windows in the dormers of the main roof and the tower have elaborate surrounds.

The land for this house was purchased by Jones P. Veazie in 1866, but the building was not started until 1874, and was finished in 1875, the year of Veazie's death. The building is one of eighteen known designs in Maine by Bangor native George W. Orff, who was trained in Boston and spent many years working in Minneapolis, Minnesota. This is one of the best-preserved of the few of these buildings to survive. Jones P. Veazie was a prominent local businessman who founded the Bangor Gazette.

== See also ==
- National Register of Historic Places listings in Penobscot County, Maine
