= Athletic Park (Minneapolis) =

Baseball park in Minnesota, US

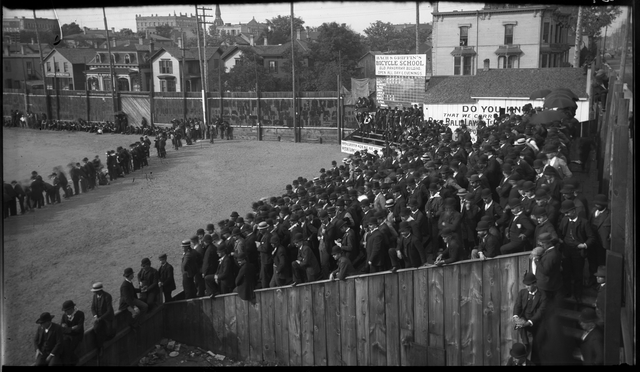
- Fans watching a baseball game from the Athletic Park bleachers, 1891.

- Location within Minnesota
- Location: Minneapolis, Minnesota
- Coordinates: 44°58′46.64″N 93°16′29.59″W
- Capacity: ~3,400
- Type: Baseball park

Construction
- Built: 1889
- Closed: 1896
- Architects: Fremont D. Orff and George W. Orff

Tenant
- Minneapolis Millers (1889–1896)

Athletic Park was the home of the Minneapolis Millers baseball team from 1889 to mid-season 1896. The park was located behind the West Hotel at 6th St and 1st Ave North in Minneapolis near where Target Center and Target Field are today.

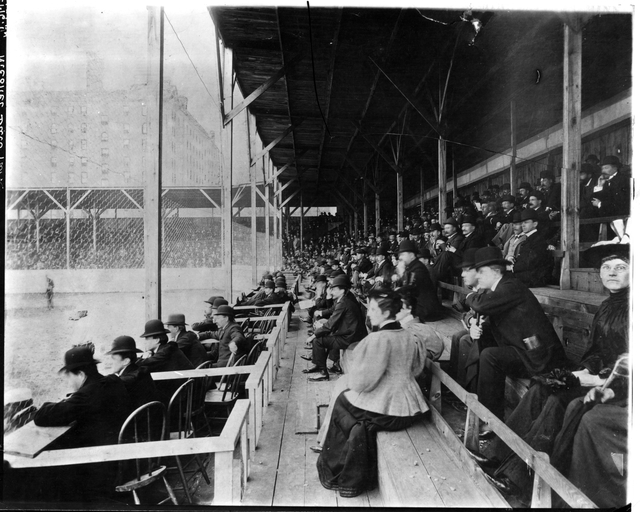
Spectators watching a baseball game at Athletic Park from the grandstand, c. 1894–1896.

The park was originally built in 1889 under the supervision of local architects Fremont D. Orff and George W. Orff. Bleachers seating roughly 1,600 people were added in 1890; a grandstand with capacity for 1,800 people was built in 1892. The park burned down in 1893, but was rebuilt the next year and further improved.

Athletic Park's playing field was very small with distances estimated at between 200 feet (61 m) to 250 feet (76 m) to the left and right field foul poles. This meant home runs were common in an era otherwise not known for them. Perry Werden's 42 home runs in 1894 and 45 home runs in 1895 were several times higher than contemporary American Association or National League players and would not be challenged until Babe Ruth's rise in the 1920s. The park's shallow outfield meant hits (particularly to right field) still required batters to run hard to first base to avoid being thrown out. High fencing and wire mesh in the outfield helped prevent balls from leaving the field. The park's small dimensions also required some ground rules for ruling whether outfield hits were counted as a ground rule double or home run.

The park was the stage for one major league game: a contest between Columbus and Milwaukee of the American Association on October 2, 1891. Milwaukee won 5–0 thanks to excellent pitching from former Minneapolis Miller Frank Killen. Several other games had been planned, but cold and rainy weather prevented playing on October 1 and 3. This would be the last major league baseball game played in Minnesota until the Minnesota Twins were founded in 1961.

Ice hockey was played here in 1896 when the Minnesota Golden Gophers men's ice hockey team played the Winnipeg Victorias. The Minnesota Golden Gophers football team also made use of the field.

The ballpark was sold during May of the 1896 baseball season and the Millers were evicted. They returned from a June road trip and opened their hastily constructed new facility, Nicollet Park.

The site remained open as a site for various events, until finally being turned over to developers. In 1901, the so-called "baseball block" was purchased by T. B. Walker and later developed into the Butler Square warehouse.

Events and tenants
Preceded by Team established	Host of the Minneapolis Millers; 1889–1896	Succeeded by Nicollet Park
