= Orff (disambiguation) =

Orff can refer to:

- Annie L. Y. Orff (died 1914), American journalist; magazine editor and publisher
- Carl Orff (1895–1982), a German composer, known for his teaching method, the Orff Schulwerk
  - Orff Schulwerk encompasses the Orff instruments and teaching methods for children
- Fremont D. Orff (1856–1914), American architect, brother of George W. Orff
- George W. Orff (1835–1908), American architect, brother of Fremont D. Orff
- Gertrud Orff (1914–2000), one of the first German music therapists
- Let's Call the Whole Thing Orff, Canadian comedy television series (1971–1972)
- The Orff, a fictional alien species in K. A. Applegate's young adult book series, Animorphs

== See also ==
- ORF (disambiguation)
