= Samuel Kidder Whiting House =

Historic house in Maine, United States

- U.S. National Register of Historic Places
- Location within Maine Location within the United States
- Location: 214 Main St, Ellsworth, Maine
- Coordinates: 44°32′34″N 68°25′15″W
- Area: 0.5 acres (0.20 ha)
- Built: 1871
- Architect: George W. Orff
- Architectural style: Second Empire
- NRHP reference No.: 83000453
- Added to NRHP: July 14, 1983

The Samuel Kidder Whiting House is a historic house at 214 Main Street (United States Route 1) in Ellsworth, Maine. Built in 1871, it is one of the finest examples of the Second Empire architecture in Hancock County. Its design is attributed to George W. Orff, an architect working out of Bangor. The house was listed on the National Register of Historic Places in 1983. It now houses a financial services office.

== Description and history ==
The Whiting House is prominently sited at the northwest corner of the junction of Main and High Streets, on the fringe of Ellsworth's central business district. This intersection is where United States Route 1 turns from Main Street (west of the junction) southward onto High Street, and Route 1A continues north onto Oak Street. The building is separated from the junction by Whiting Park, a small public park created early in this century on land formerly owned by Whiting. The house is a three-story wood-frame structure, with two full stories and a third under the mansard roof. It is roughly square in shape, with a slightly projecting central pavilion in the front (south-facing) facade that is topped by a mansarded observatory. The entrance is sheltered by a flat-roof portico supported by clusters of columns, with low balustrades to the sides. The building's corners are decorated with paneled pilasters, and there is a projecting single-story bay to the east. All of the roof lines have modillioned eaves, and windows have decorative shallow hoods, except the first floor front windows, which have a gabled pediment above. A 1 1/2-story ell projects to the rear of the building. The interior of the main block retains original decorative elements, including lavish woodwork and decorative hardware.

The house was commissioned by Samuel Kidder Whiting, a local dry goods merchant, in 1871, when he was 54 years old, and it was his home until his death in 1917. Its design has been attributed to Bangor architect George W. Orff;the house bears some resemblance to other examples of Orff's work in Bangor. It is the largest known work of his outside Bangor. The building now houses a financial services firm.

== See also ==
- National Register of Historic Places listings in Hancock County, Maine
