= Field hockey pitch =

Playing surface in field hockey

Standard pitch measurements. The field of play is 91.4 by 55.0 metres (100 yd × 60 yd) with an area of 5,027 square metres (1.24 acres).

A hockey pitch is the playing surface for the game of field hockey. Historically, the game was played on natural turf (grass) and nowadays it is predominantly played on artificial turf. The transition to artificial pitches came during the 1970s and was made mandatory for major competitions in 1976. All the lines, markings and goal specifications are outlined by the International Hockey Federation in "The Rules of Hockey".

All line markings on the pitch form part of the area which they define. For example, a ball on the side line is still in the field of play; a ball on the line of the penalty circle is in the penalty circle; a foul committed over the 23-metre (25-yard) line has occurred in the 23-metre area. A ball must completely cross a boundary line to be out of play, and a ball must wholly cross the goal line before a goal is scored.

Due to the original formulation of the rules in England, the standard dimensions of a hockey pitch were originally expressed in imperial units. The rules are now expressed explicitly in metric dimensions (since 1998), although the use of the imperial terms remains common in some countries.

== Field of play ==
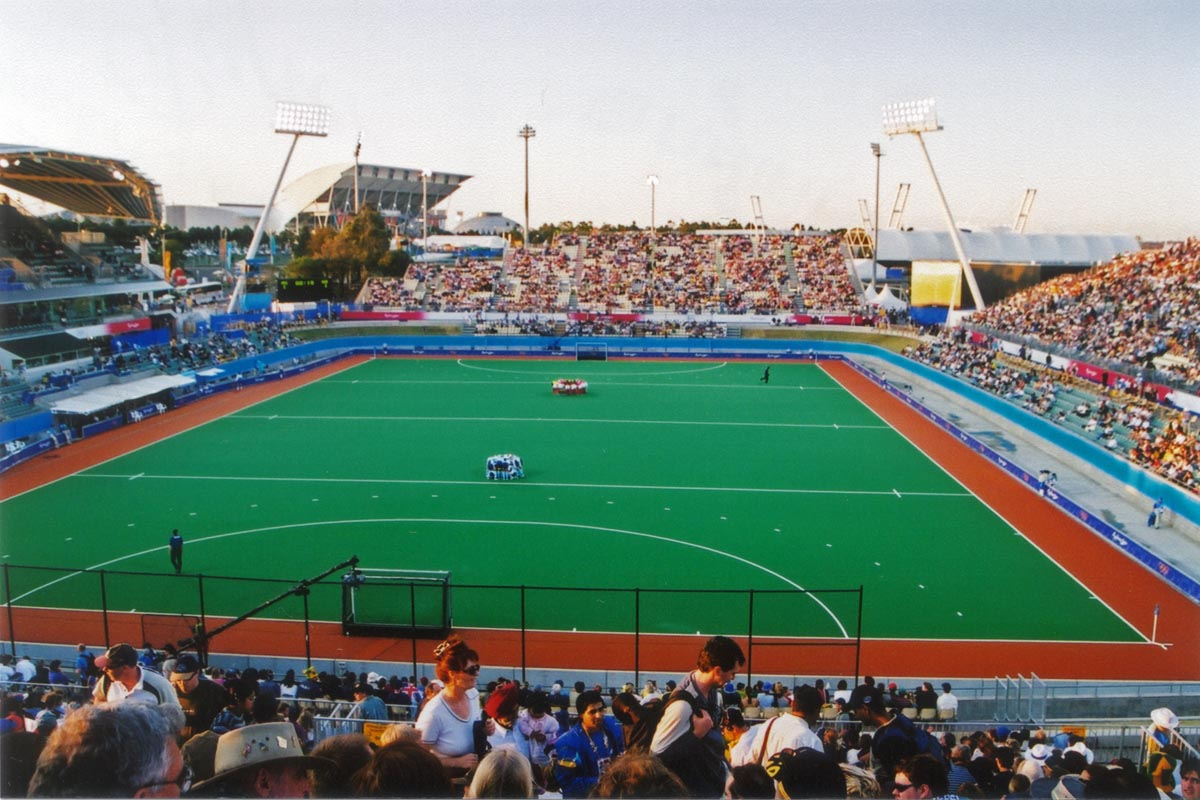
Coloured pitches are used to distinguish the field of play (green) from the run-off (red).

The hockey pitch is rectangular in shape. The longer perimeter edges are called the side line, the opposing shorter edges are referred to as the back line and the portion of this between the goal posts is known as the goal line. The side line must measure 91.40 m (100 yd) and the back line should measure 55.00 m (60 yd). There must be a minimum run-off of 2 m (6 ft 7 in) at the sidelines and 3 m (10 ft) at the backlines, which may be a different surface for the final metre. All line markings must be white and 75 millimetres (3.0 in) wide. In each corner of the pitch, a corner flag of no more than 300 mm (12 in) square is attached to a post of height 1.20–1.50 m (3 ft 11 in – 4 ft 11 in).

Historically, the pitch dimensions were imperial and were replaced by metric equivalents in 1998. The first recorded rules represented what London clubs were using at the time. Surbiton Hockey Club's minutes from 1876 stated that pitches were to be "100–150 yards (91–137 m) long and 50–80 yards (46–73 m) wide". Rules by the Hockey Association of England in 1886 specified "100 yards long by 55 to 60 yards (50 to 55 m) wide". In 1905, the International Rules Board allowed the width of the pitch to be "up to 66 yards (60 m)" but this decision was reversed in 1909. In 1975, the current width of 60 yards was written into the rules.

On artificial surfaces, the field of play should be coloured green, ultramarine blue or signal blue. It is permitted for the run-off portion of the pitch to be an alternative colour. The London 2012 Olympics started a new trend for blue hockey pitches because blue turf helps television viewers to clearly see the ball and markings on the hockey pitch during gameplay. Not all hockey pitches have to be blue, but a yellow ball on blue turf is now the standard for professional field hockey tournaments.

== Goal ==
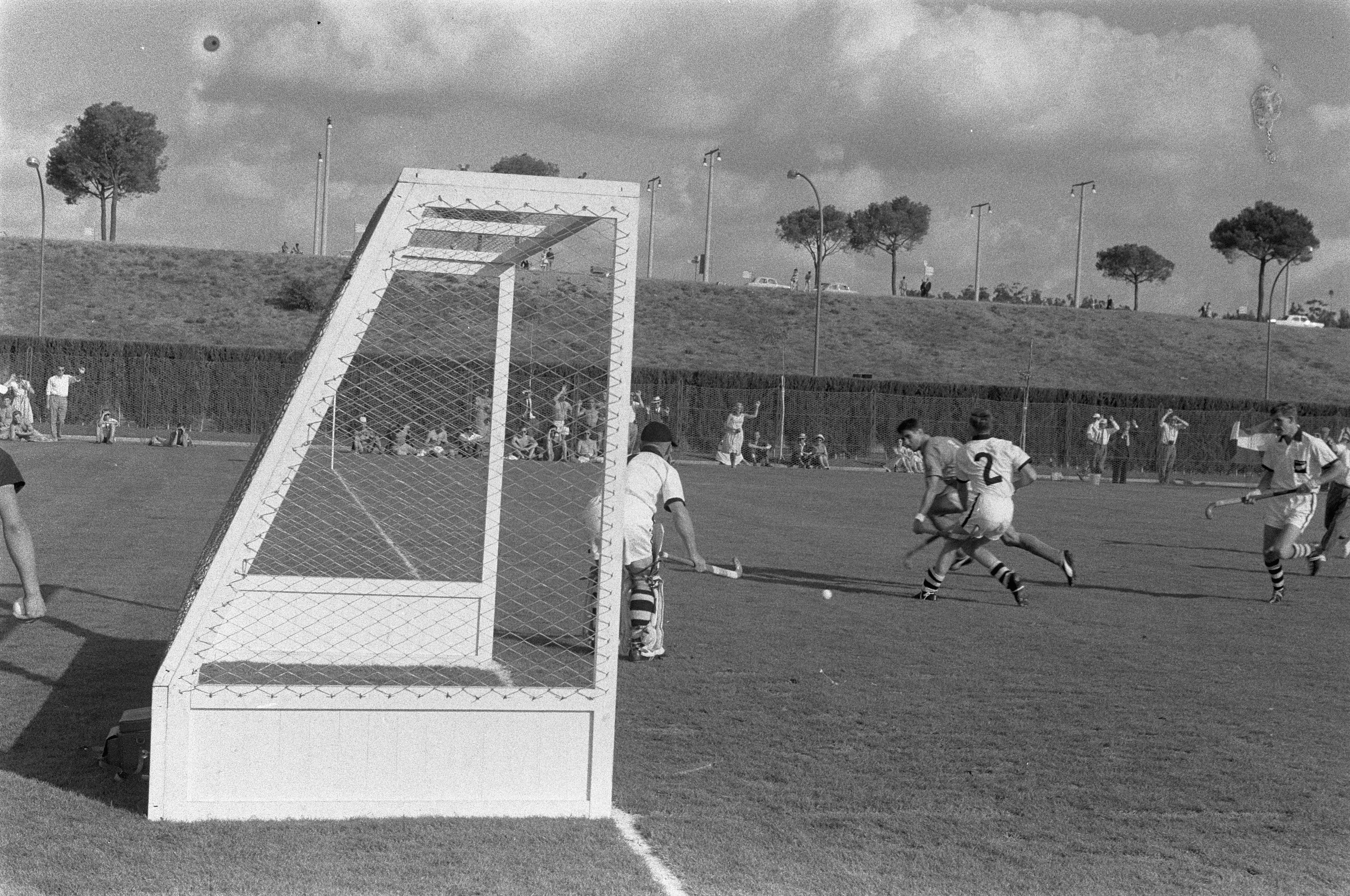
A hockey goal at the 1960 Summer Olympics. The goal is deeper at ground level with side and backboards around the base.

Goals consist of two upright posts placed equidistant from the centre of the backline, joined at the top by a horizontal crossbar. The inner edges of the posts must be 3.66 metres (4 yd) apart, and the lower edge of the crossbar must be 2.14 metres (7 ft) above the ground. The goalposts and crossbar must be white and rectangular in shape with width 50 millimetres (2 in) and a depth of 50 to 75 millimetres (2 to 3 in).

The goal must be at least 1.20 m deep at ground level and at least 0.90 m deep at crossbar level. The goal area must be delimited at ground level by a goal backboard and two sideboards of height 460 millimetres (18 in). Affixed to these boards, the posts and crossbar is a net to stop the ball.

Hockey nets can come in different dimensions depending on how deep at ground level and at crossbar level the goal is. Typical dimensions for a standard field hockey net are around 3.7m (W) x 2.1m (H) x 1.2m (D).

The first hockey goals were "7 feet (2.1 m) tall posts placed 6 yards (5.5 m) apart" but were reduced to 4 yards (3.7 m) apart in the 1886 rules. In 1987, a rule was introduced so that at penalty corners "the first hit at goal should not cross the goal-line higher than 18 inches (460 mm)". This saw the introduction of a sideboard and backboard to the goals which are now mandatory.

== Circle ==
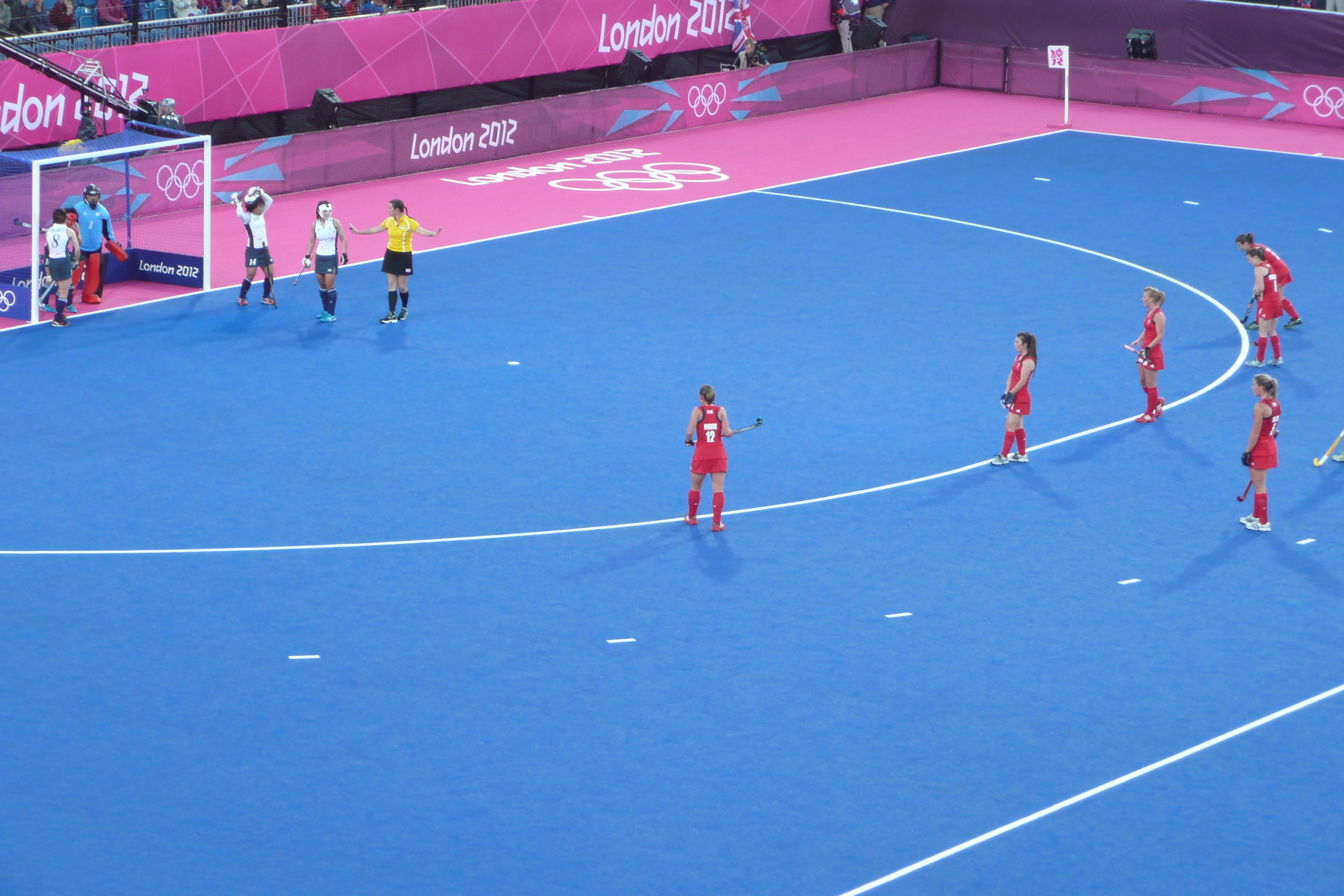
A view of the penalty circle (solid line), the broken circle 5 m from it, and the penalty spot.

A goal is scored when the ball passes completely over the goal line but only if the ball was played by an offensive player in the penalty circle. Additionally, the circle marks the area a goalkeeper may play the ball with any part of their body and the area where an infringement by a defender results in a penalty corner. The terminology circle (or D) is widely used although the area is actually formed by a 3.66-metre (4 yd) straight line, parallel to the goal line, connected to two 14.63-metre (16 yd) quadrant arcs.

The 1876 rules stated that "no goals shall be allowed if the ball be hit from a distance of more than 15 yards (14 m) from the nearest goalpost". A visible "striking circle" with "radius of 15 yards" was codified in 1886. The radius of the circle was increased to 16 yards (15 m) in 1951 for men's hockey and 1968 for women's hockey. Any free-hit within 5 m of the circle has slightly different rules from others concerning other players’ distance; a broken circle 5 m from the penalty circle denotes this location.

A penalty spot is centrally positioned directly in front of the goal and used for a penalty stroke. The spot is 150 mm in diameter and its centre is 6.475 m from the outside of the goal line. Penalty strokes were introduced in 1963 for deliberately stopping a certain goal; they were originally taken 8 yards (7.3 m) from goal. In 1973, a stroke could also be awarded for a deliberate foul in the circle and the spot was moved to 7 yards (6.4 m) from goal the following year.

== Other markings ==
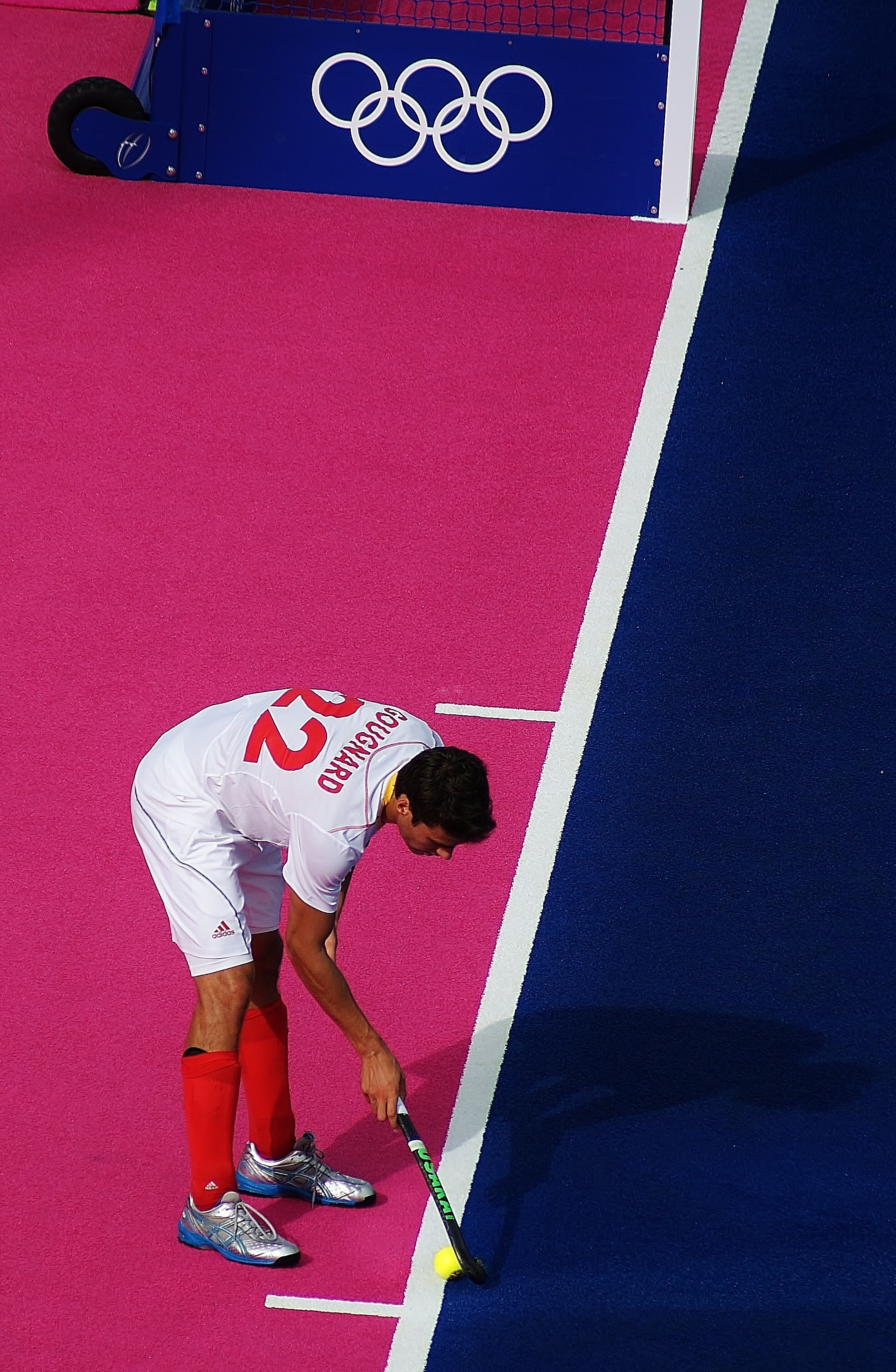
Simon Gougnard prepares to take a penalty corner from the 10 m mark. The 5 m line above demarcates the closest position a defender may stand.

A half-way line, parallel to the back line, divides the pitch in two. The start of each period of play and resumption of play following a goal starts with all players in the half they are defending. The line was also used for the obsolete offside rule.

Each half of the pitch is then divided again by a line, referred to as the 23 metre line or 25 yard line, positioned 22.90 m from each back line. Historically, this was first used to resume play after the ball passed over the back line and marked by flags at the side of the pitch. In 1949, deliberate defensive offenses in this area resulted in a penalty corner. From 1961, players on the defensive team who were not involved at the penalty corner stood behind this line (this was then moved to the half-way line two years later). The line was also used for the offside rule between 1987 until the rule was abolished in 1996. Nowadays, there are detailed rules regarding fouls and free-hits in the 23 metre region of the pitch. Since 2015, the 23 metre line has also been used for the attacking team to resume play when it has gone over the back line (this replaced long corners).

There are additional markings 300 mm long and perpendicular to the back line that denote distances of 10 m and 5 m from each goal post. These are relevant at a penalty corner; the former is the mark from which the attacking team takes the penalty corner and the latter is the closest position which a defender may stand. These marks had been 5 and 10 yards (4.6 and 9.1 m) in earlier versions of the rules. There is a similar mark 5 m from along the side line (from where long corners were formerly taken) and a mark 14.6 m along the side line indicating the level of the top of the penalty circle. There are also 150 mm long markings where the goal posts are situated.

== Artificial playing surface ==
Artificial grass permits easier ball control and this in itself helps to reduce the number of infringements of the rules—which means less whistle and fewer stoppages. The game thus becomes easier to follow, as well as being a faster spectacle and much more interesting from a spectator point of view.

— World Hockey, 1975

Historically, the game was developed on natural grass turf. However, in 1976, the International Hockey Federation (FIH) made artificial pitches mandatory at all major competitions. The 1976 Summer Olympics in Montreal was the first of these; however at this time few players had seen or played on synthetic pitches. Although it is still permissible to play on natural turf, all national competitions and international matches must be played on an artificial surface. Elite-level competitions, such as the Olympic Games and World Cup, require a water-based playing surface. However, due to water conservation efforts, this is not seen as a long-term sustainable option and alternative elite surfaces that do not require water are being researched.

There are three main types of artificial hockey surface:

- Unfilled or water-based – artificial fibres that are densely packed for stabilisation, requires irrigation or watering to avoid pitch wear
- Dressed or sand-dressed – artificial fibres can be less densely packed and sand supports the fibres for part of the pile depth
- Filled or sand-filled – artificial fibres can be longer and less densely packed and sand supports the fibres for 100% of the pile depth

On water-based pitches, shorter fibres and wetted turf reduce friction and increase the speed at which the game can be played. However, these pitches require watering before, during and after the game and maintenance costs are significant. Sand-dressed pitches cost more than sand-filled pitches but are preferable for hockey as there is an absence of sand close to the playing surface. However, a multi-purpose surface suitable for sports including association football and tennis is often required and hockey may not be the predominant sport. There are many different specifications and categorisations for artificial turf including shock absorption, surface rebound, friction, and strength outlined by the International Hockey Federation. Recently, longer-pile third-generation or 3G pitches have become popular, especially for football, but these do not usually meet the FIH's test criteria; they are often too inconsistent and slow.

=== Criticism ===
World Hockey magazine reported on the first hockey tournament played on an artificial pitch in 1975—a trial event in Montreal prior to the Olympics—and said the surface had "enormous benefits". Steve Ruskin, of Sports Illustrated, said that "A slow, analytical game gave way to one of nonstop, true-hop action." However, it has been stated that the decision to make artificial surfaces mandatory greatly favoured more affluent Western countries who could afford these new pitches. Before the switch to an artificial surface the Indian men's hockey team were dominant, winning seven of the eight Olympic gold medals between 1928 and 1964. In 1996, Indian hockey player Ajit Pal Singh stated that despite its size "[India] can afford only 12 or so AstroTurf fields". Sardara Singh, captain of the Indian men's hockey team, said that "hockey players in India play on astroturf [sic] for the first time at the age of 19 or 20 and find it hard to adapt." It is claimed that the Pakistan hockey team have performed well following the change of surface despite the country being worse off economically and having fewer artificial pitches but the Pakistani team has also not reached the Olympic finals except once in 1984. When describing the change of surface, Ruskin said that "for India it was like starting over, with all nations even in field hockey."

== Sources ==
- "Handbook of Performance, Durability and Construction Requirements for Synthetic Turf Hockey Pitches" (PDF). International Hockey Federation. February 2014.
- "Rules of Hockey" (PDF). International Hockey Federation. 2012.
- "Rules of Hockey" (PDF). International Hockey Federation. 2015.
