= Off-Site Source Recovery Project =

The Off-Site Source Recovery Project (OSRP) is a U.S. government project funded by the Department of Energy at Los Alamos National Laboratory. The OSRP's mission is to remove excess, unwanted, abandoned, or orphan radioactive sealed sources that may pose a risk to health, safety, and national security.

This government project had its beginnings in the Energy Department's early Environmental Management program. Environmental management was intended to clean up environmental contamination and dispose of vast quantities of radioactive and hazardous waste stemming from several decades of nuclear weapons design, research, testing and production.

One of the issues faced by the early Environmental Management program was substantial amounts of radioactive and hazardous materials at universities and other locations left over from contracts and grants into various aspect of nuclear technology research. The Energy Department began addressing this problem with a low-budget effort called the Offsite Waste Program.

Initially, the scope of the OSR Project included all Greater than Class C (GTCC) sealed sources, but the mission has been expanded to include public safety and national security. As a result, in 2003, OSRP direction and oversight moved from the Department of Energy's Office of Environmental Management, to the National Nuclear Security Administration.

The project mainly addresses sources containing americium and plutonium. The recently expanded mission also includes recovery of beta or gamma emitting sources, like caesium and strontium.

Since 1999, OSRP has been able to recover more than 35,000 sources from nearly 1300 sites, all 50 States, the DC area, Puerto Rico and several foreign countries.
