= ORF =

ORF or Orf may refer to:

- Norfolk International Airport, IATA airport code ORF
- Observer Research Foundation, an Indian research institute
- One Race Films, a film production company founded by Vin Diesel
- Open reading frame, a portion of the genome that has the potential to code for a protein
- Open Road Films, a joint venture of Regal Entertainment Group and AMC Theatres
- Operation Royal Flush, a military deception employed by the Allied Nations during the Second World War
- ORF (broadcaster), Austrian public service broadcaster
- Orf (disease), a cutaneous condition
- ORF format, Olympus raw image file format with extension .orf
- Orf, Iran, a village in Kohgiluyeh and Boyer-Ahmad Province, Iran
- Ostróda Reggae Festival, a music festival in Poland

== See also ==
- Orff (disambiguation)
- Orfe
- ORFS
