= Off Site (restaurant) =

Restaurant in Miami, Florida, U.S.

- Interactive map of Off Site

Restaurant information
- Location: 8250 NE Second Ave., Miami, Florida, 33138, United States
- Coordinates: 25°51′03″N 80°11′35″W

Off Site is a restaurant in Miami, Florida.
