= Bayfield County Courthouse =

- U.S. National Register of Historic Places
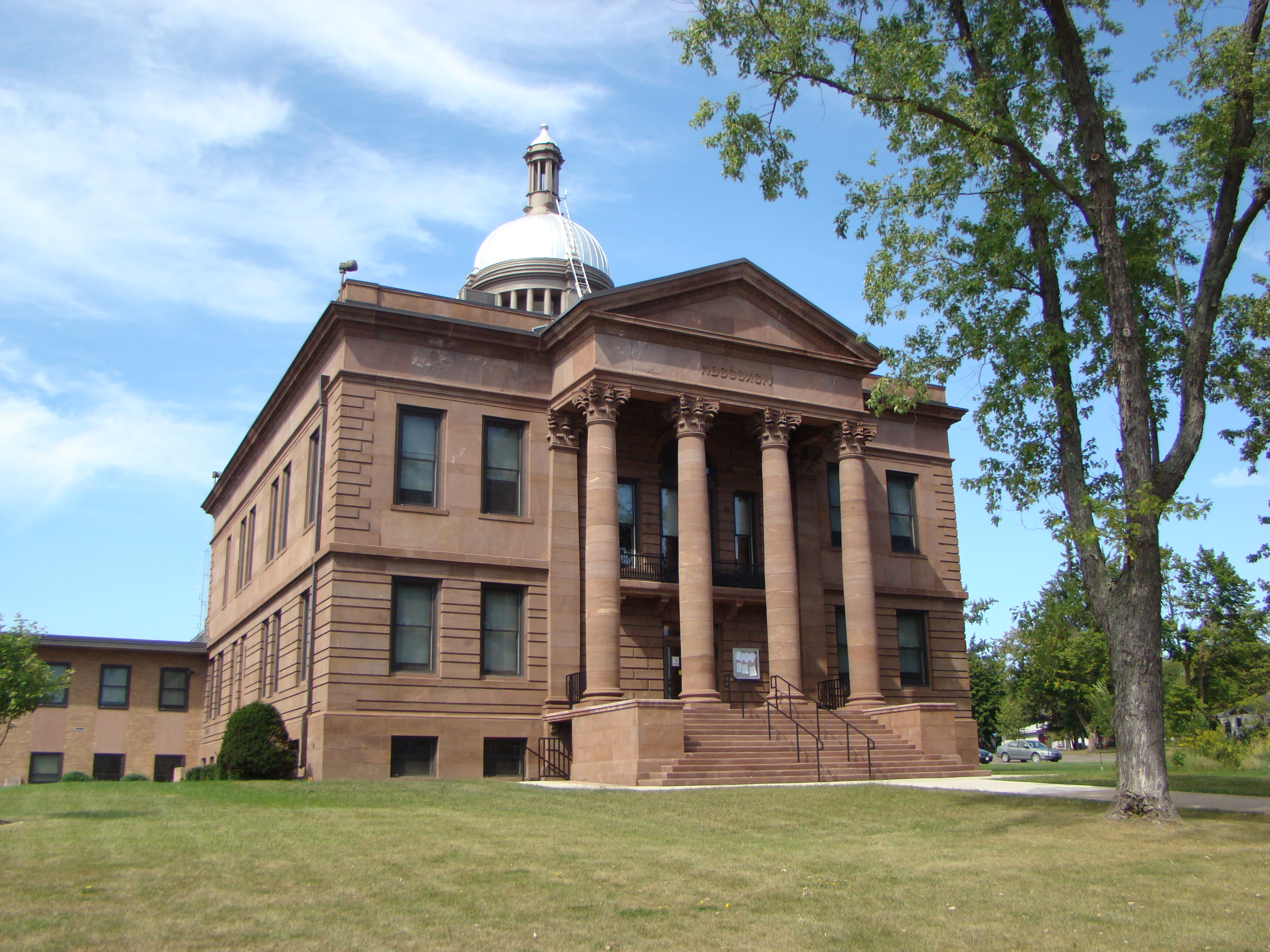

- Location within Wisconsin Location within the United States
- Interactive map showing the location for Bayfield County Courthouse
- Location: 117 E. 5th St., Washburn, Wisconsin
- Coordinates: 46°40′37″N 90°53′33″W
- Area: less than one acre
- Built: 1894–96 by John Halloram
- Architect: Off & Joralemann
- Architectural style: Classical Revival
- NRHP reference No.: 75000060
- Added to NRHP: January 17, 1975

Bayfield County Courthouse is a historic courthouse in Washburn, Wisconsin. Construction on the courthouse began in 1894, two years after the county seat moved to Washburn and was completed in 1896. The courthouse cost $31,737 to build. The Neoclassical building features a domed cupola, a portico with Corinthian columns as its front entrance, and quoins at the corners. When first built, the courthouse had an extensive telephone system connecting each office; at the time, this was considered "one of the proudest achievements" of the new building.

The courthouse was added to the National Register of Historic Places on January 17, 1975.
