= Offside (bandy) =

Offside is a rule in bandy which states that if a player is in an offside position when the ball is touched or played by a teammate, the player may not become actively involved in the play. A player is in an offside position when closer to the opponent's goal-line than both the ball and the second-to-last defender (which is usually the last outfield player), and also in the opponent's half of the bandy field. "Offside position" is a matter of fact, whereas committing an "offside offence" occurs when a player is "actively participating" and is subject to the interpretation of the referee. Goals scored after committing an offside offence are nullified if caught by the referee.

The offside rules are virtually the same in bandy as the offside rules in association football (therefore, pictures of a green football field are used here to illustrate it). In bandy, they are regulated in section 11 of the Bandy Playing Rules set up by the Federation of International Bandy (FIB).

== Application ==
The blue forward on the left of the diagram is in an offside position as he is in front of both the second-to-last defender (marked by the dotted line) and the ball. Note that this does not necessarily mean he is committing an offside offence; it only becomes an offence if the ball were to be played to him at this moment, whether or not he is in an offside position when he receives the ball, as he could receive the ball in an onside position but he'd still have committed an offside offence.

The blue forward in the penalty box of the diagram is not in an offside position, as he is behind the ball, despite the fact that he is in front of all but one of his opponents.

The application of the offside rule may be considered in three steps: offside position, offside offence and offside sanction.

=== Offside position ===
A player is in an offside position if three conditions are met: first, the player must be in the opposing team's half of the rink. Second, the player must be in front of the ball, i.e. closer to the end-side of the field than the ball. And third, there must be fewer than two opposing players between him and the opposing goal line, with the goalkeeper counting as an opposing player for these purposes. It is not necessary that the goalkeeper be one of the last two opponents. Any attacker that is level with or behind the ball is not in an offside position and may never be sanctioned for an offside offence.

=== Offside offence ===
It is regulated in section 11.2 of the Rules, that the referee shall stop the game because of offside, if a player receives the ball in offside position, or if he when he is in an offside position disturbs the play or the opponent, or if the player in his position gains an advantage in the game. The player must be in this position at the moment the ball is played. In comment section C11.9, we are reminded that an offside situation "shall be judged at the moment the ball is played, and not in the moment when it was received. This does not mean that an offside shall be called immediately. It might be an advantage for the referee to see how the situation develops." FIB has clarified in section 11.2 in fine and in the comment section C11.5 of the Bandy Playing Rules that a player who does not participate in the game and does not disturb his opponent, shall not be stopped for offside.

The offside rule also applies to free-strokes, penalty shots, face-offs and goal-throws; this is clarified in comment section C11.1 of the Rules. A player, who is in offside position, can be stopped for offside when he receives the ball from a teammate even if the ball on its way touches an opponent (C11.2) but the player shall not be called for an offside position if he receives the ball played from an opponent (C11.3), which of course may leave it up to the referee to deem if a ball passing a defending player's stick was just touching it or if the defender was playing the ball.

=== Offside sanction ===
When the game has been stopped because of offside, according to section 11.2 of the Rules the defending team shall have a free-stroke. The free-stroke is to be executed from the place where the offside infringement took place, that is, where the off-sided player was when the ball was passed to him.
