= Offside (field hockey) =

Abolished rule in field hockey

There is currently no offside rule in field hockey. There were prior offside rules, rules that restricted the positioning of players from the attacking team in a way similar to the offside rule in association football. The evolution of the field hockey offside rule culminated with its abolition in the mid-1990s.

== History of the offside rule ==
=== 1876 rule ===
A set of rules of field hockey was drawn up by several clubs in London in January 1876 following the establishment of the first, briefly existing, Hockey Association (of England) the year before. (The second, and final, Hockey Association was formed in 1886.) An offside rule was included in the 1876 rules. Under this rule, a player who was nearer to the opponent team's goal-line than both the ball and the third to last opponent was said to be at an offside position (simply put: an attacking player was offside if the ball was behind them and there were fewer than three defenders between them and the goal they were attacking). The rule was applied on the whole pitch, except when the ball was hit from the goal-line.

=== 1886 rule ===
In 1886, the second England Hockey Association drew up a code of Rules based on those used by clubs in the London area. Offside was then applied to attacking players from the half-way line only.

=== 1972 rule change ===
The 1886 offside rule remained unchanged until 1972, when offside was changed from 3 to 2 defenders.

=== 1987 rule change ===
In 1987, the offside was amended to apply only in the 25 yards area.

=== Offside abolished ===
After various amendments, the offside rule was finally repealed. "No offside" was introduced as a mandatory experiment in 1996 and it was confirmed as a rule in 1998 by the Hockey Rules Board. The aims of this change were:

- to transfer the balance of power towards the offense,
- to create more space around the circle and mid-field,
- to help the flow of play, more goals and fewer whistles, and
- to make the game more exciting and appealing to spectators.

New tactics were developed by many teams to exploit this new rule.

== Evolution of the offside rule in diagrams ==
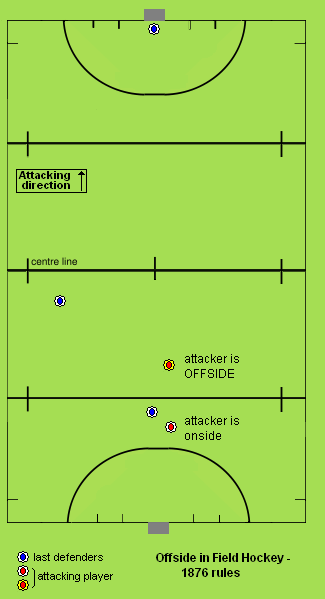
1876 rule

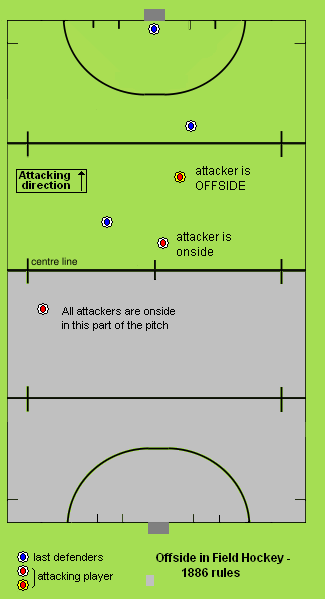
1886 rule

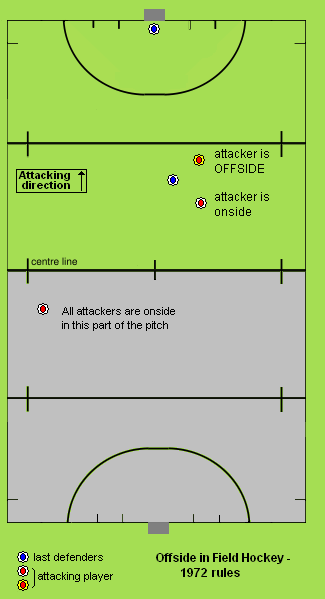
1972 rule

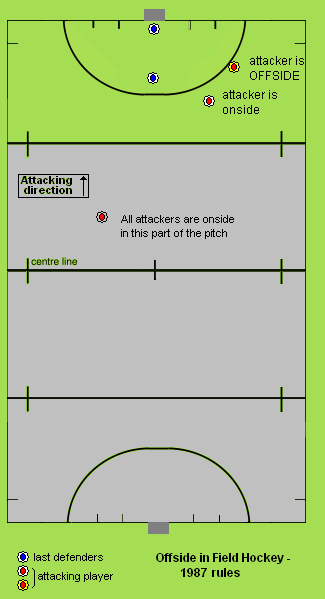
1987 rule

== Sources ==
- FIH - History of rules
- USA Field Hockey Field Hockey Rules History
- New No-offside Rule
