= Captain Austin Jenks House =

Historic house in Minnesota, United States

- Capt. Austin Jenks House
- U.S. National Register of Historic Places
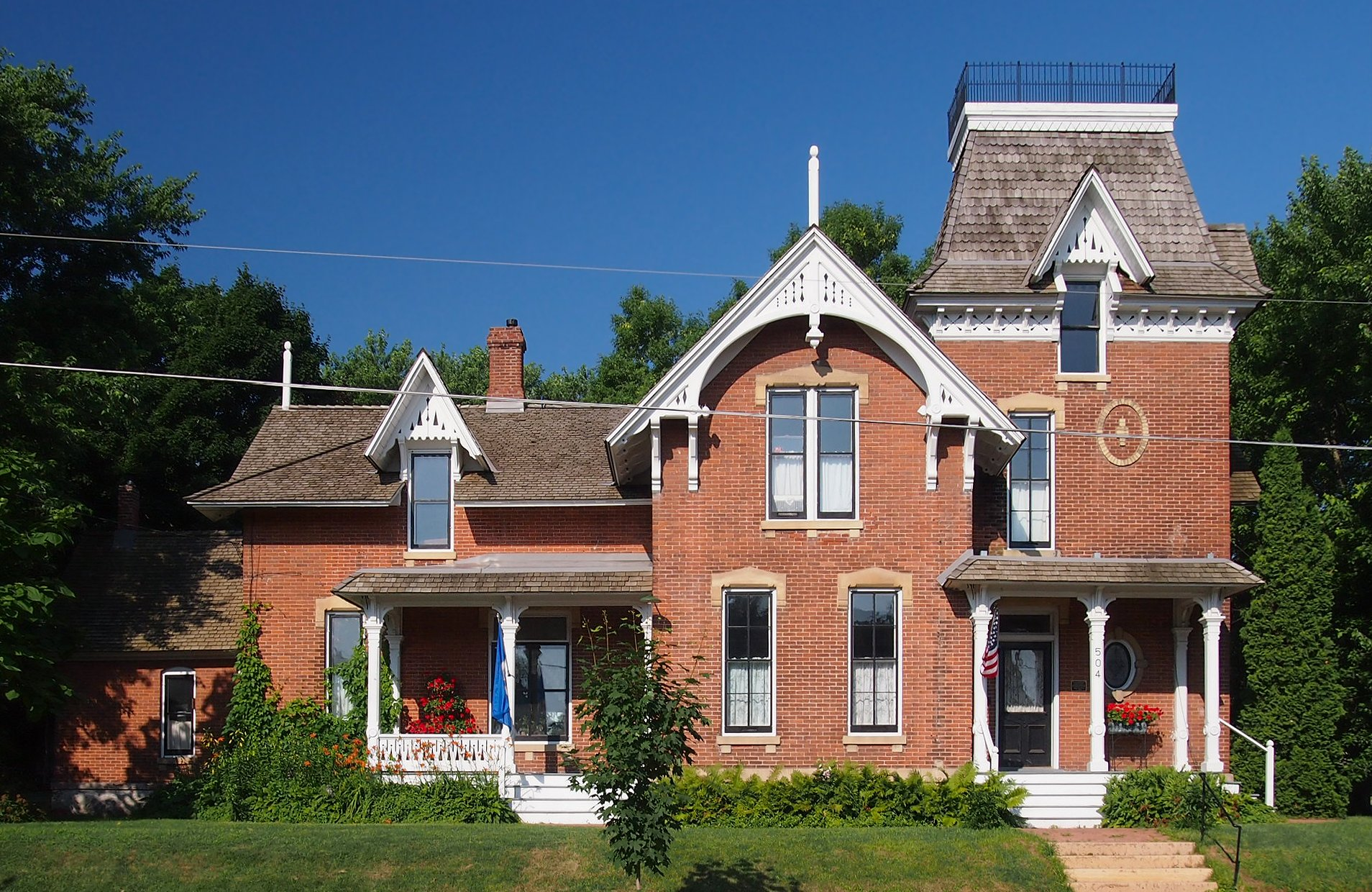
- The Captain Austin Jenks House from the east

- Location within Minnesota Location within the United States
- Interactive map showing the location of Captain Austin Jenks House
- Location: 504 South 5th Street, Stillwater, Minnesota
- Coordinates: 45°3′5″N 92°48′36″W
- Area: Less than one acre
- Built: 1871
- Architectural style: Italianate/Gothic Revival/Second Empire
- MPS: Washington County MRA
- NRHP reference No.: 82003085
- Designated NRHP: April 20, 1982

The Captain Austin Jenks House is a historic house in Stillwater, Minnesota, United States, built in 1871. Austin Jenks (d. 1902) was a prominent businessman and river pilot involved in timber rafting on the Mississippi and St. Croix Rivers. The house was listed on the National Register of Historic Places in 1982 for having local significance in the themes of architecture, industry, and transportation. It was nominated for its association with Jenks and the importance of water transportation to the region's foundational lumber industry.

== Description ==
The Jenks House is a one-and-a-half-story brick structure with a two-and-a-half-story tower. Its distinctive appearance derives from a combination of three architectural styles. The bracketed square entry bay and cruciform roofline are elements of Italianate architecture while the platform porches, oval stained glass window, and mansard roof on the tower come from Second Empire architecture. The steep gables, finials, stone window sills and lintels, and detail on the eaves all signal Gothic Revival architecture.

== History ==
Austin Jenks is believed to have been born and raised in the Town of Schroon, Essex County, New York, and initially worked as a schoolteacher. He migrated west to Illinois and then came to Stillwater in 1855, where he found employment as a river pilot helping transport the bounty of lumber downstream. In 1871 he became a ship owner, having commissioned and put into service the Brother Jonathan, only the second steamboat engaged in timber rafting on the Upper Mississippi River. Three years later he joined the lumber firm of Durant, Wheeler, and Company.

Jenks later became a financier, serving as the director of Stillwater's two leading banks, the Stillwater Dock Company, and the Stillwater Electric Light Company. He also served as president of the Stillwater Board of Education and on various other managing boards. He married three times, his first two wives having died early. With Harriet Bennett, his third wife and reportedly the sister of his first, he had two daughters, Genora and Grace. Jenks died in March 1902 at the age of 68.

The house remained in the family for another two decades, but Genora and her husband Robert Skeith emigrated to Canada in 1916 while Harriet and Grace relocated to Seattle in 1920. The house passed through a succession of owners, and from the 1950s to the 1970s was subdivided into separate apartments. A later owner has since restored it to a single-family home.

== See also ==
- National Register of Historic Places listings in Washington County, Minnesota
