= Philip Brown =

Philip or Phillip Brown may refer to:

- Philip Brown (actor) (born 1958), American actor
- Philip Brown (alpine skier) (born 1991), Canadian alpine ski racer
- Philip Brown (Charlottetown politician) (born 1958/59), Canadian politician
- Philip Brown (Prince Edward Island politician) (born 1957), Conservative Canadian politician
- Phillip Brown (sociologist) (born 1957), British sociologist of education, economy and social change
- Philip E. Brown (1856–1915), jurist in the state of Minnesota
- Philip F. Brown (1842–1921), American politician in the Virginia House of Delegates
- Philip Marshall Brown (1875–1966), American educator and diplomat
- Philip Martin Brown (born 1956), English actor
- Philip Brown (1838–1913), Canadian merchant, immigration officer and religious figure in Manitoba who constructed Shaarey Zedek Synagogue in Winnipeg

== See also ==
- Phil Brown (disambiguation)
