= Hampden Congregational Church =

Historic church in Maine, United States

- U.S. National Register of Historic Places
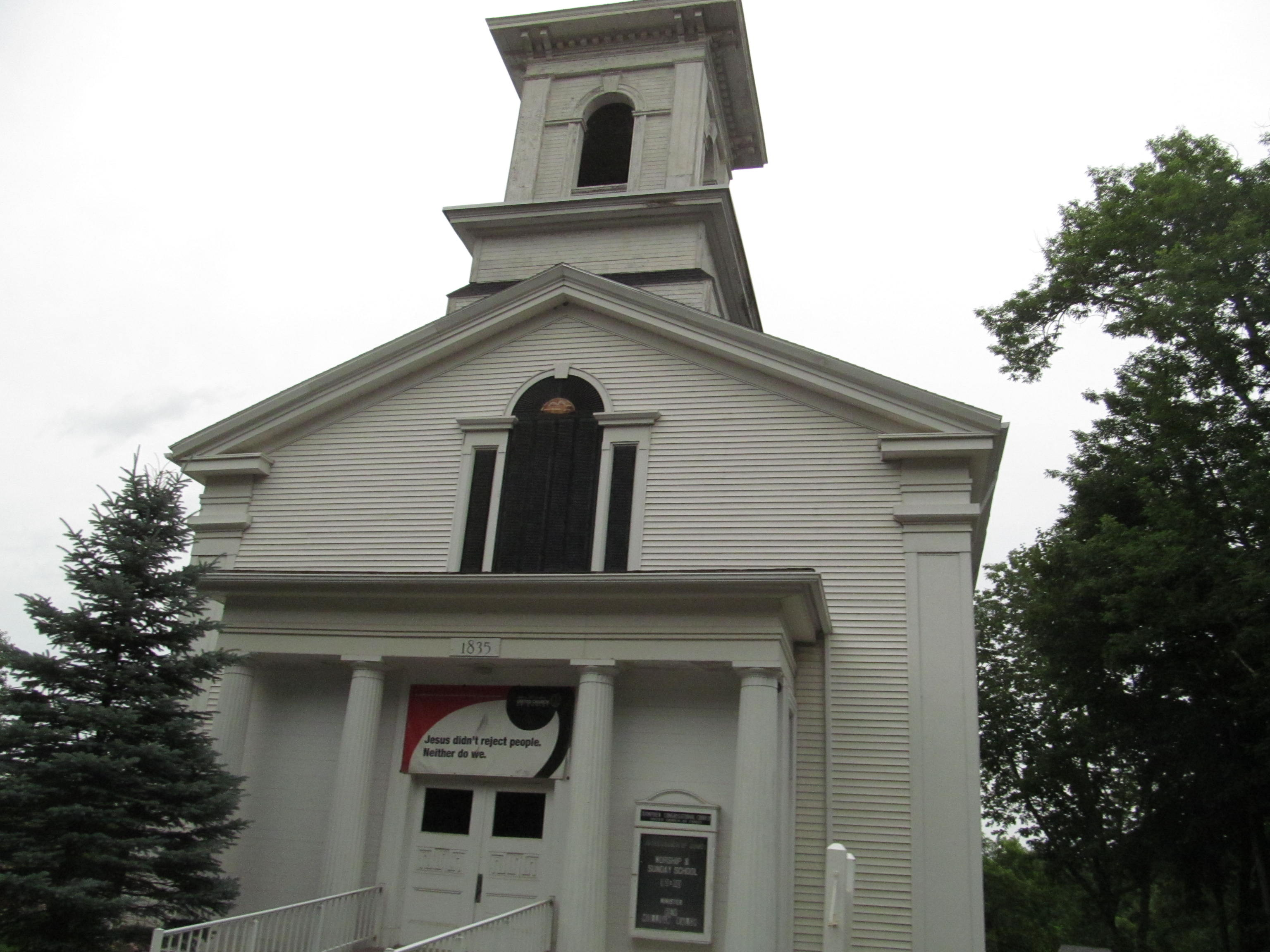

- Location within Maine Location within the United States
- Location: Main Rd. N, Hampden, Maine
- Coordinates: 44°44′47″N 68°50′12″W
- Area: less than one acre
- Built: 1835
- Architectural style: Greek Revival, Federal
- NRHP reference No.: 87000921
- Added to NRHP: June 25, 1987

Hampden Congregational Church is a historic church at 101 Main Road North in Hampden, Maine. Built in 1835 for a congregation founded in 1817, it exhibits a high-quality blend of Federal, Greek Revival, and Italianate architecture. It was listed on the National Register of Historic Places in 1987.

== Description and history ==
The Hampden Congregation Church is located near the Hampden village center, on the east side of Main Street North (United States Route 1A and Maine State Route 9). It is a rectangular wood frame structure, with a front-facing gable roof and clapboard siding. The building corners are pilastered, supporting entablatures that run along the sides. The front (west-facing) facade is symmetrically arranged, with a projecting enclosed entry vestibule beneath a round-arch window with flanking pilasters. The vestibule has four Doric columns supporting an entablature and shallow-pitch hip roof, with a double-door entrance at the center. A three-stage square tower rises above the ridge line. The first two stages are quite short, the upper one topped by a broad eave. The belfry rises above, with broad corner boards and round-arch openings with balustrades. The eave above is dentillated, and has paired brackets above the corner boards. A weathervane rises above the low-pitch pyramidal roof.

The church congregation was established in 1817, and initially met in the Hampden Academy building under the auspices of the Maine Charity School. The congregation was eventually affiliated with the United Church of Christ. Land for a building was donated in 1834, and the present building was constructed in 1835; its designer is unknown. As originally built, the building exhibited a high quality blend of Federal and Greek Revival elements, and is distinguished from its contemporaries by its vestibule; the Italianate tower was probably added in the 1860s. It is possible the tower was designed by Bangor architect Benjamin Deane, who is known to have designed the nearly identical tower atop the Washington County Courthouse in Machias.

Due to dwindling attendance, the church congregation voted to disband in early 2023. The last service and decommissioning of the building was held on June 25, 2023. While the property is no longer being used as a church and up for sale, the Hampden Neighborhood Food Cupboard continues to operate out of the building.

== See also ==
- National Register of Historic Places listings in Penobscot County, Maine
