= Justice Brown =

Justice Brown may refer to:

- Allyn L. Brown (1883–1973), chief justice of the Connecticut Supreme Court
- Armstead Brown (1875–1951), associate justice of the Florida Supreme Court from 1925 to 1946
- Calvin Brown (1854–1923), chief justice of the Minnesota Supreme Court
- Charles Stuart Brown (1918–1997), associate justice of the Wyoming Supreme Court
- Clifford F. Brown (1916–2011), associate justice of the Ohio Supreme Court
- Eric Brown (judge) (born 1953), chief justice of the Ohio Supreme Court
- Ethan Allen Brown (1776–1852), associate justice of the Ohio Supreme Court
- G. A. Brown (1849–1915), associate justice of the Oklahoma Supreme Court
- George Brown (Rhode Island politician) (1746–1836), associate justice of the Rhode Island Supreme Court
- George F. Brown (c. 1820–1893), associate justice of the Supreme Court of Mississippi
- George H. Brown (North Carolina judge) (1850–1926), associate justice of the North Carolina Supreme Court
- George H. Brown Jr. (born 1939), associate justice of the Tennessee Supreme Court
- George Houston Brown (1810–1865), associate justice of the New Jersey Supreme Court
- George M. Brown (judge) (1864–1934), associate justice of the Oregon Supreme Court
- Henry Billings Brown (1836–1913), associate justice of the Supreme Court of the United States
- Herbert R. Brown (born 1931), associate justice of the Ohio Supreme Court
- J. Hay Brown (1849–1930), chief justice of the Supreme Court of Pennsylvania
- James H. Brown (judge) (1818–1900), associate justice of the Supreme Court of Appeals of West Virginia
- James Brown (South Dakota judge) (c. 1864–1936), associate justice of the South Dakota Supreme Court
- Janice Rogers Brown (born 1949), associate justice of the California Supreme Court
- Jean Brown (judge) (born c. 1952), associate justice of the Alabama Supreme Court
- Jeff Brown (judge) (born 1970), justice of the Texas Supreme Court
- Joel B. Brown (1872–1953), associate justice of the Alabama Supreme Court
- John Chilton Brown (1860–1915), associate justice of the Supreme Court of Missouri
- John W. Brown (New York politician) (1796–1875), ex officio a judge of the New York Court of Appeals
- Joseph E. Brown (1821–1894), chief justice of the Supreme Court of the state of Georgia
- Lloyd O. Brown (1928–1993), associate justice of the Ohio Supreme Court
- Lyle Brown (1908–1984), associate justice of the Arkansas Supreme Court
- Nathan Brown (judge) (c. 1772–1848), associate justice of the Rhode Island Supreme Court
- Paul W. Brown (1915–2000), associate justice of the Ohio Supreme Court
- Philip E. Brown (1856–1915), associate justice of the Minnesota Supreme Court
- Robert L. Brown (Arkansas judge) (born 1941), associate justice of the Arkansas Supreme Court
- Russell Brown (judge) (born 1965), Puisne justice of the Supreme Court of Canada
- Thomas Jefferson Brown (1836–1915), associate justice of the Texas Supreme Court
- Timothy Brown (judge) (1889–1977), associate justice of the Wisconsin Supreme Court
- William Browne (judge) (1737–1802), associate justice of the Massachusetts Supreme Judicial Court
- William B. Brown (1912–1985), associate justice of the Ohio Supreme Court
- William Little Brown (1789–1830), associate justice of the Tennessee Supreme Court
- Yvette McGee Brown (born 1960), associate justice of the Ohio Supreme Court

== See also ==
- Judge Brown (disambiguation)
- Jefferson B. Browne (1857–1937), associate justice of the Florida Supreme Court
- Thomas C. Browne (c. 1794–c. 1858), associate justice of the Illinois Supreme Court
