= London Underground D78 Stock =

British rolling stock

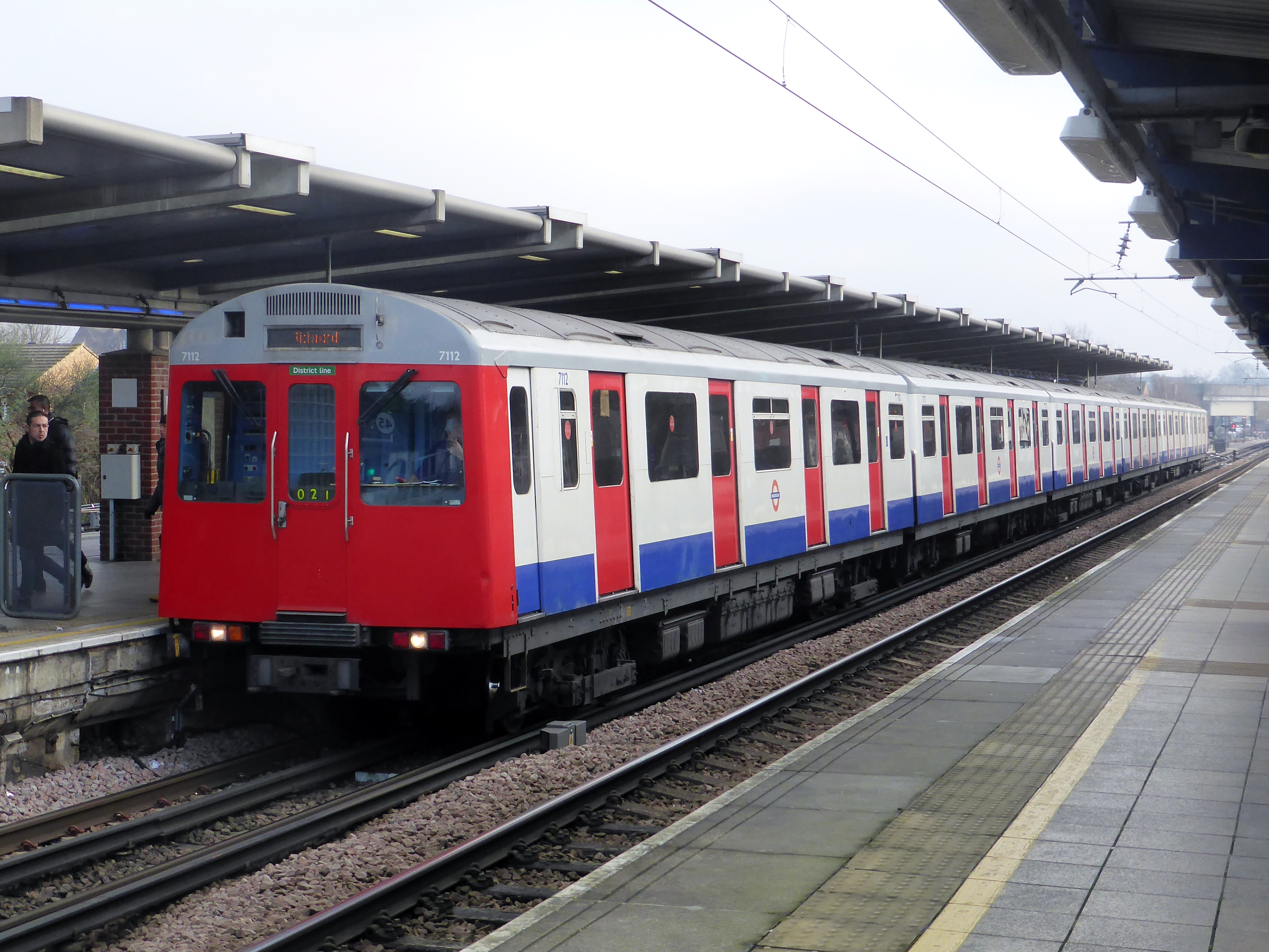
- Refurbished D78 Stock train at West Ham in 2014

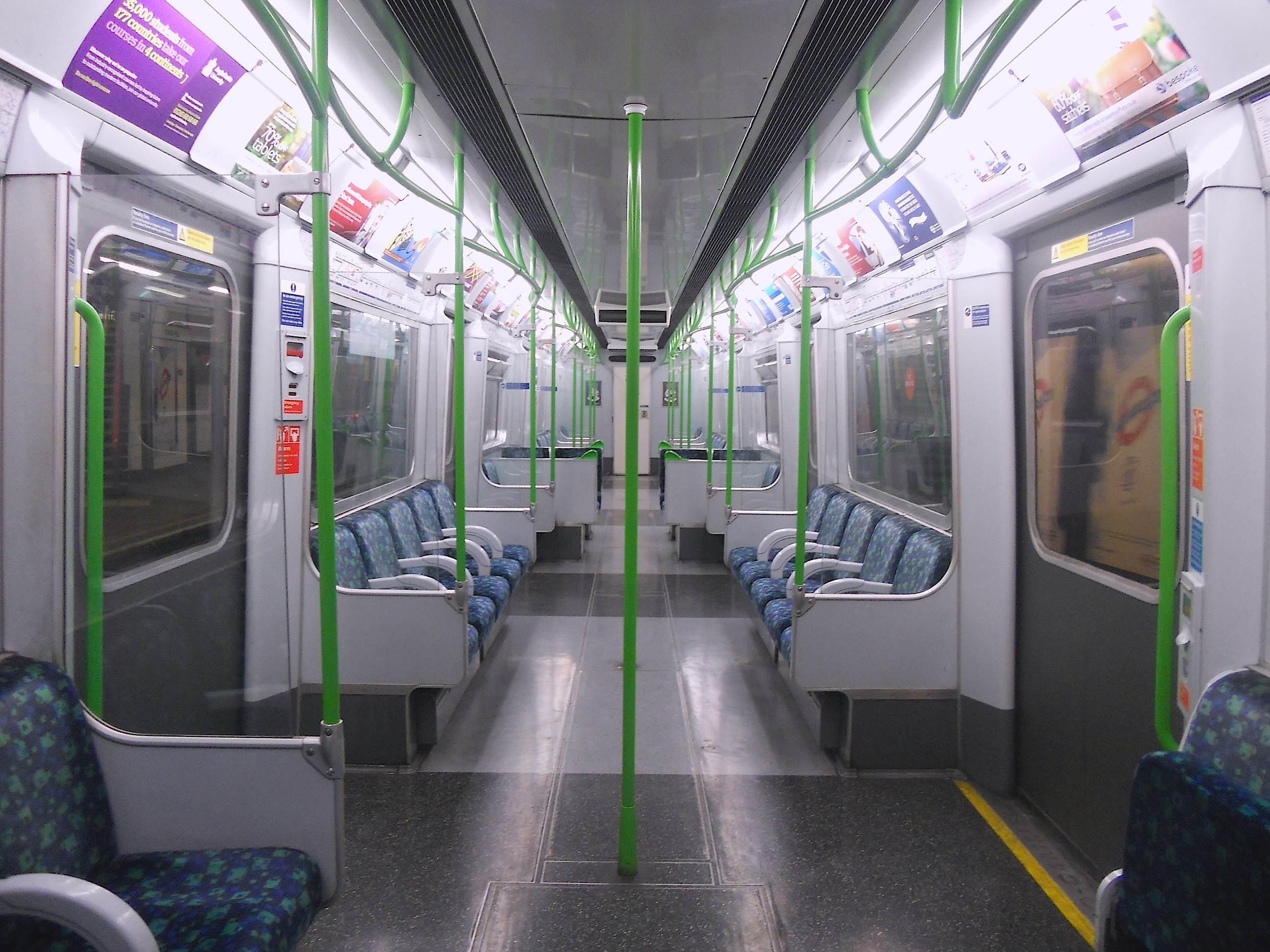
- The interior of a refurbished D78 Stock car
- Stock type: Subsurface
- In service: 28 January 1980 – 21 April 2017 (London Underground)
- Manufacturer: Metro-Cammell
- Built at: Washwood Heath, England
- Replaced: O and P Stock; R Stock
- Constructed: 1978–1981
- Refurbished: Bombardier (at Derby Litchurch Lane Works) 2004–2008
- Number built: 75 sets (450 cars)
- Successor: S7 Stock
- Formation: 3 cars per unit, 2 units per train
- Capacity: 821 per train
- Line served: District

Specifications
- Car length: DM 18.37 m (60 ft 3 in); UNDM/T 18.12 m (59 ft 5 in)
- Width: 2.85 m (9 ft 4 in)
- Height: 3.62 m (11 ft 11 in)
- Doors: Single leaf, four per side
- Maximum speed: 72 km/h (45 mph)
- Weight: DM 27.46 tonnes (27.03 long tons; 30.27 short tons); UNDM 26.11 tonnes (25.70 long tons; 28.78 short tons); T 18.40 tonnes (18.11 long tons; 20.28 short tons)
- Traction system: Pneumatic single camshaft (GEC Traction)
- Traction motors: LT118 DC motor (Brush Traction)
- Seating: 280 per train

The London Underground D78 Stock, commonly referred to as D Stock, was a type of sub-surface rolling stock which operated on the District line of the London Underground, except on the Wimbledon to Edgware Road service. The first units were withdrawn in January 2015 with the last withdrawn on 21 April 2017.

== History ==
The D stock was ordered in 1976 to replace the pre-war CO/CP Stock and post-war R Stock on the District line. Seventy-five six-car trains were built by Metro-Cammell, Washwood Heath, the first entering service on 28 January 1980 with last delivered in 1983.

== Details ==
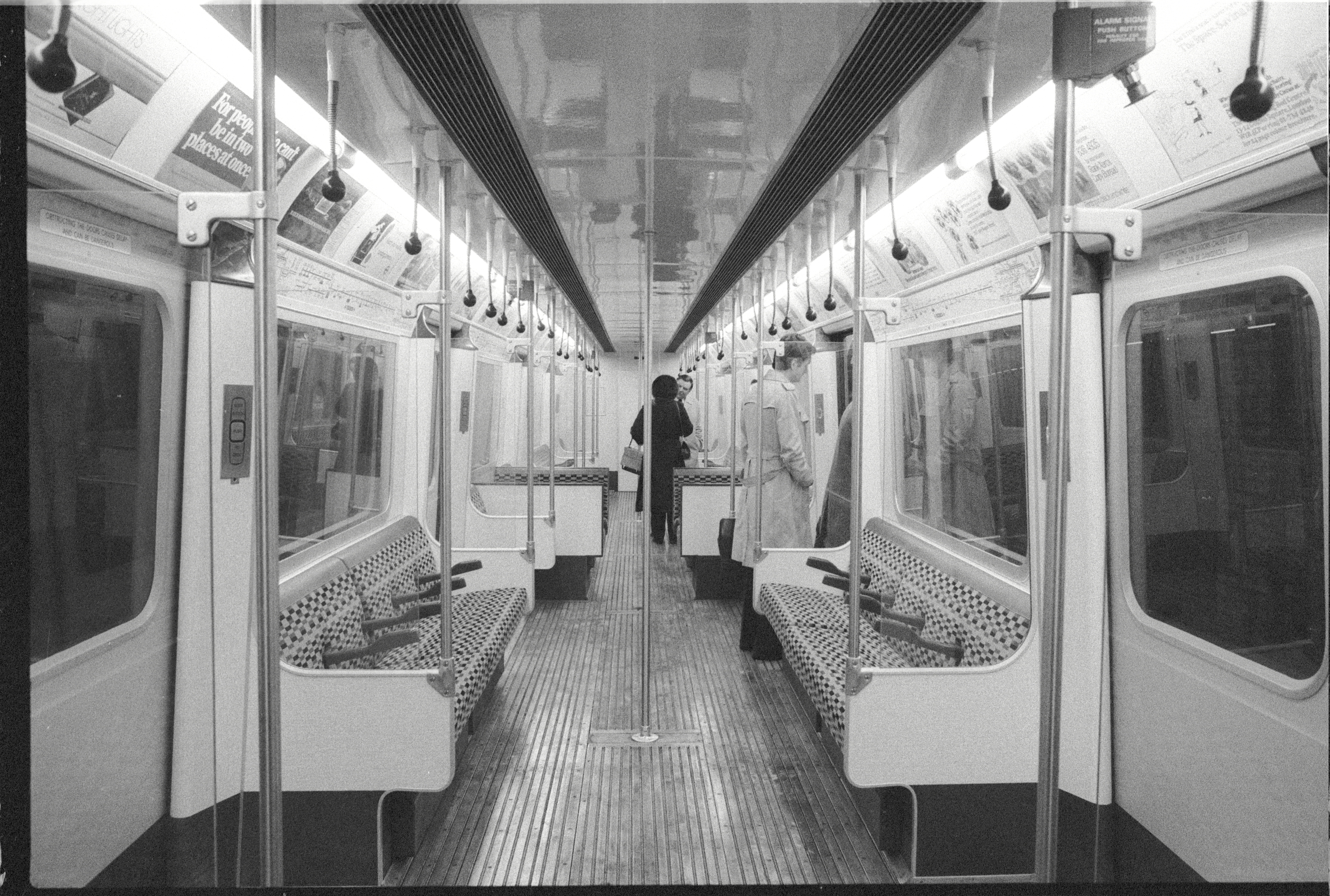
D78 stock interior as built, photograph taken during press run, 9 January 1980. Moquette was orange/brown rectangle pattern. Windows were non-opening; hopper ventilators were fitted after complaints of poor ventilation.

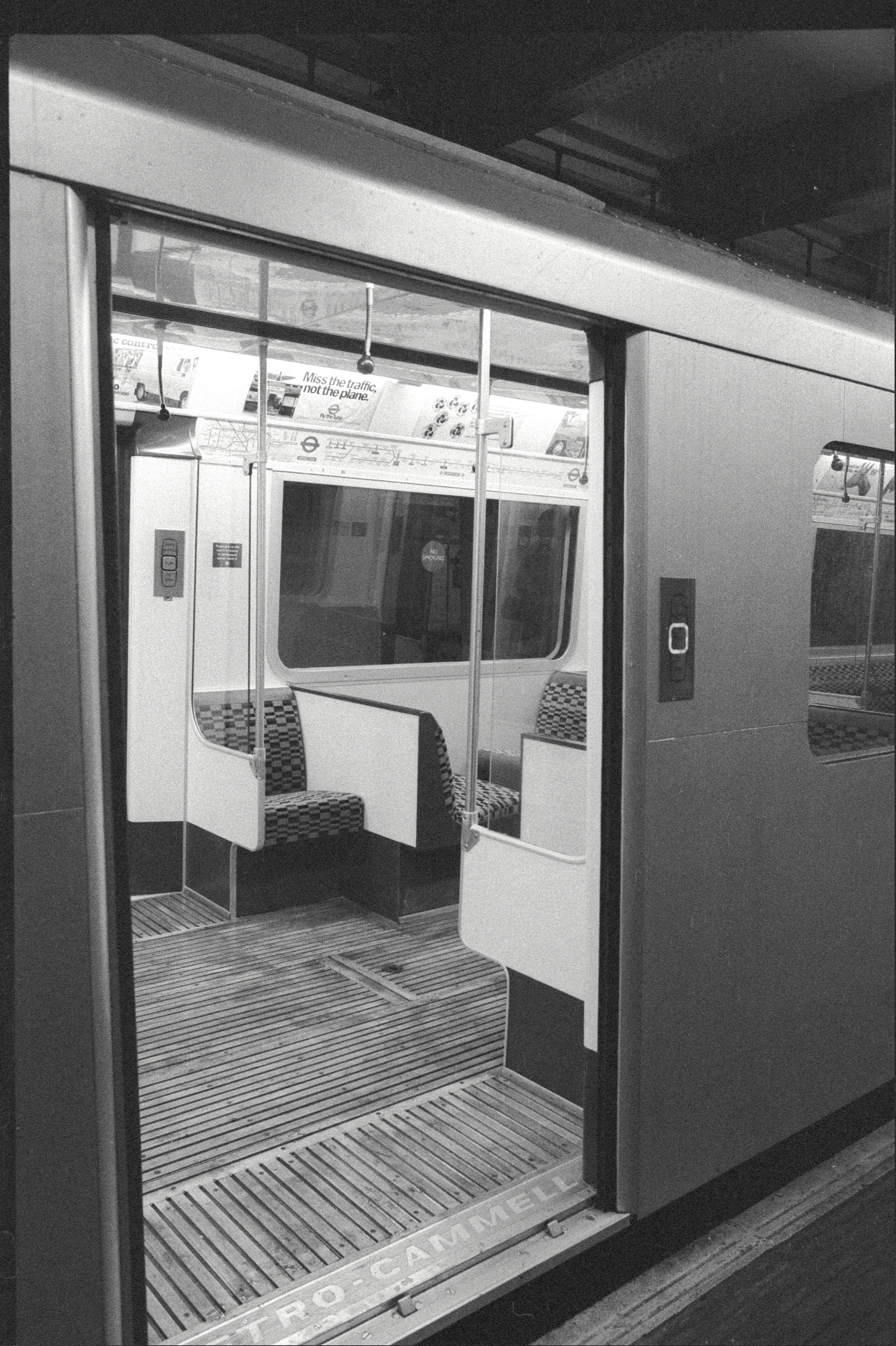
Single leaf doorway of D78 stock; photograph taken on press run.

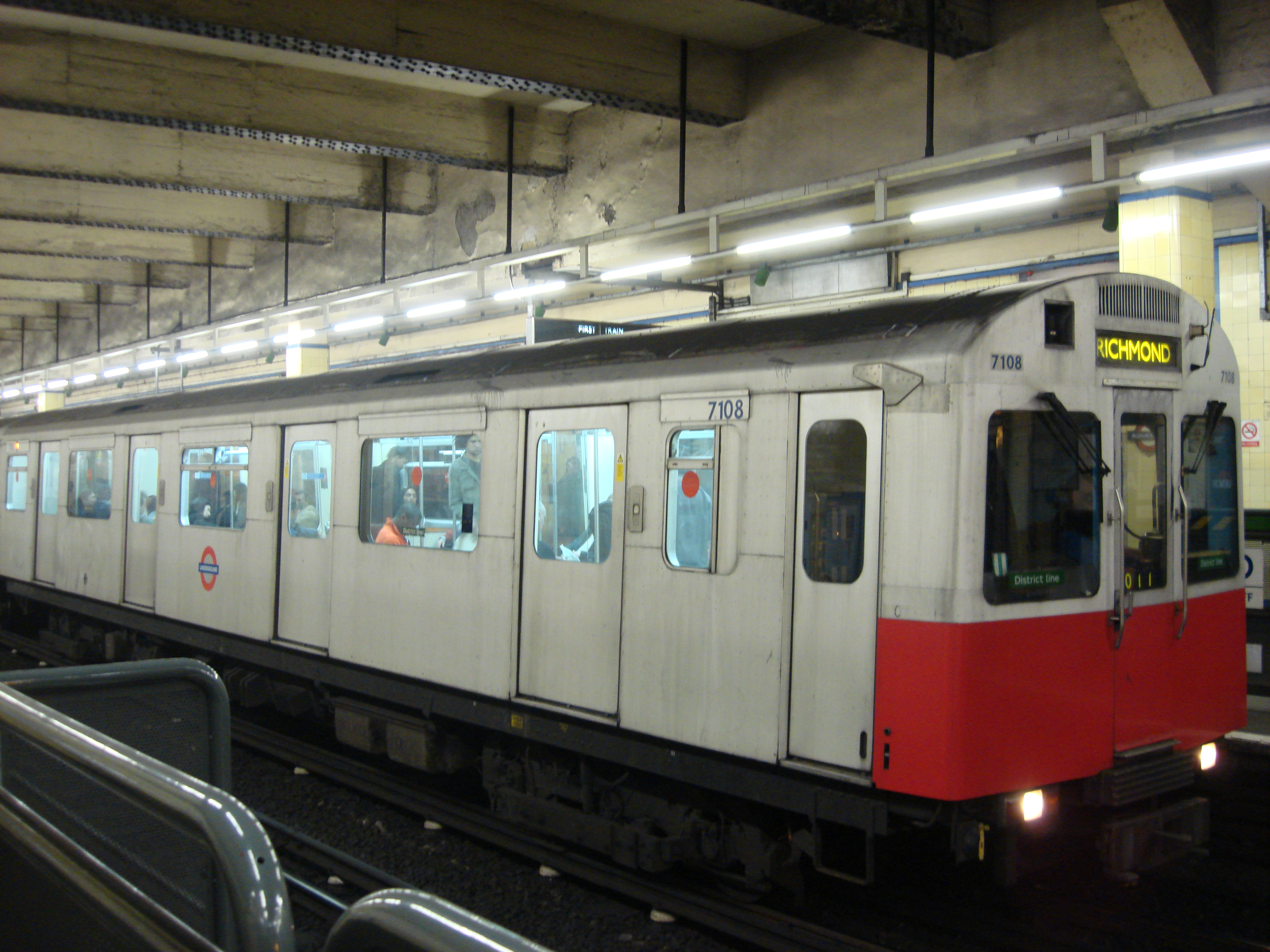
D78 stock in unrefurbished condition at Aldgate East in 2007

The D Stock consisted of six-car trains, as opposed to the seven-car trains of CO/CP and R Stock, whose cars were shorter: under normal operation, each train consisted of two 3-car units, and 20 of the units were double-ended to allow 3-car operations under exceptional circumstances.

The traction motors were the same LT118 type as on 1973 Tube Stock, and the bogies are same, unlike other subsurface rolling stock. With single-leaf doors and transverse and longitude seating, the style is very similar to 1983 stock on the Jubilee line. The D stock and 1983 stock trains were the only trains on the underground to have their headlights positioned under the train body; many trains on the underground had only their tail lights under the body.

The trains brought many innovations. The Metalastik rubber/metal "Chevron" primary springs and 'diabolo'-shaped rubber/metal secondary springs suspension meant a smoother ride for passengers. The driver's cab is more ergonomic, the seat swiveling to move forwards, backwards, up or down. The dead man's handle is replaced by a joystick that needs to be twisted for the dead man feature, and moved fore and aft for motoring and braking. There is a Train Management System replacing the original Train Equipment Panel that highlights faults to the driver.

The most noticeable difference between the stock and earlier trains is that the doors are single leaf. Originally, passengers pressed door-control buttons to open them. Posters explaining how to operate the doors were put up around Tube stations in English, French and German when the stock was introduced. The stock had a "POGO" switch (Passenger open/Guard's open) that could switch control of the doors from passengers to the guard (when the stock was introduced, the guard controlled the doors from the rear cab).

While this function proved useful at above-ground stations and termini (especially in winter), station dwell time was significantly increased, and passengers had trouble getting used to the new system, not knowing how to open the door. By the late 1990s, the control of the doors went to the driver. The buttons remained, but they were covered up during refurbishment between 2004 and 2008.

At over 18 metres (59 ft), the cars were the longest on the Underground. The windows had to be modified because of overheating when new, with pull-down opening windows installed in each car.

== Usage ==
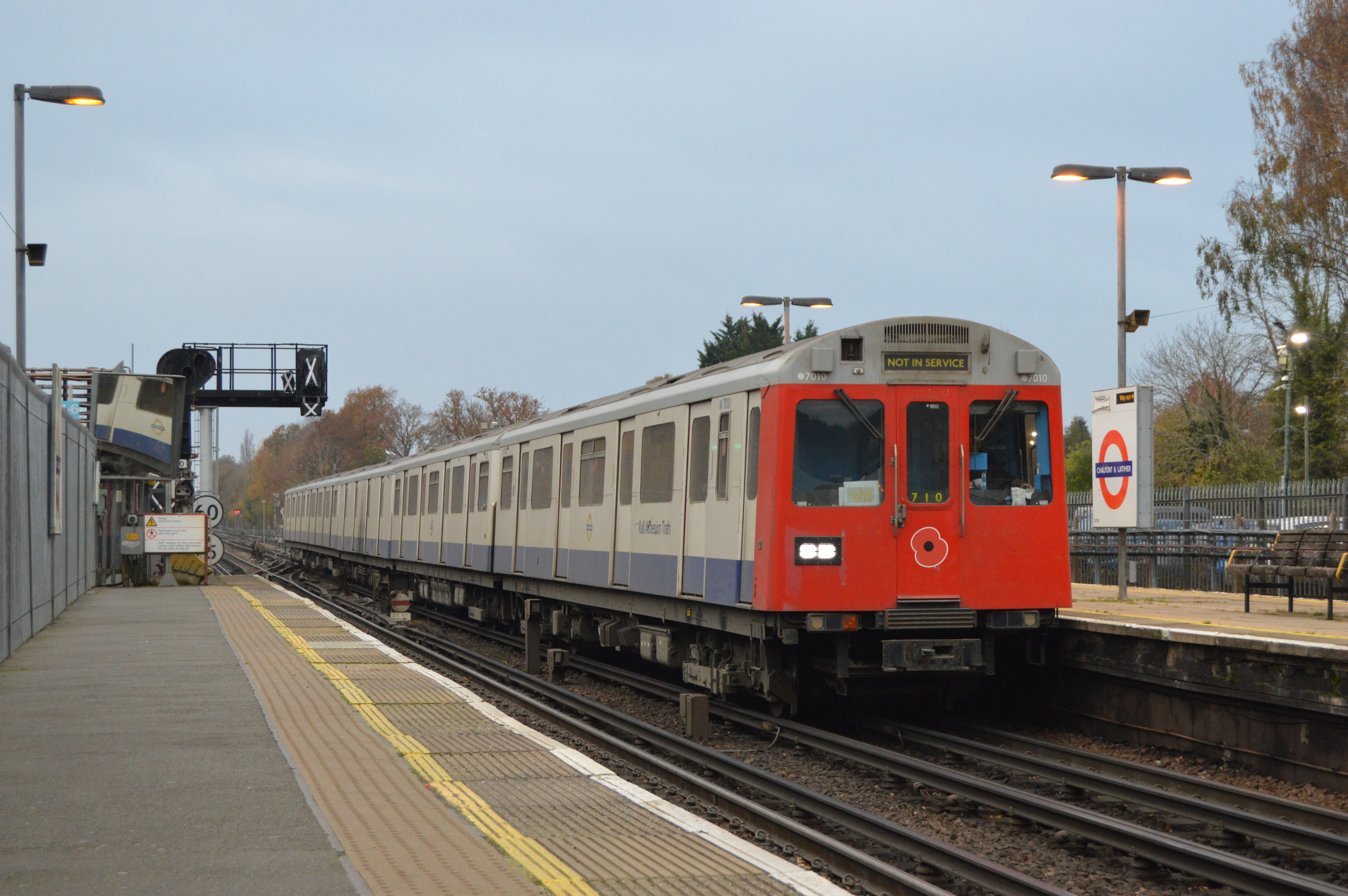
D stock Rail Adhesion train at Chalfont & Latimer station.

The stock was used on the District line, except the High Street Kensington to Edgware Road section, because the platforms are not long enough for D Stock.

Between April 1985 and May 1987, the stock operated the East London line service in three-car formations, there being enough stock spare because of reduced services on the District line. This allowed A60/62 Stock to be sent for One Person Operation (OPO) conversion. The A60/62 stock took over the service again in 1987. The class received the Class 499/0 designation on British Rail's TOPS system to operate on the Richmond and Wimbledon branches.

The stock started being replaced by S Stock in 2016. It was replaced about 15 years short of its intended lifespan, as a consistent new fleet will allow for frequencies to be increased and will reduce maintenance costs.

In July 2011, Harrogate Chamber of Commerce proposed to use the stock on the Harrogate line from York to Leeds via Harrogate to increase capacity. Stations in the Harrogate and Leeds urban areas are close together: the superior acceleration of the stock over the Class 150 diesel multiple units used at the time was intended to cut journey times. It was proposed that the line would be electrified with third rail, similar to the Docklands Light Railway, as opposed to the London Underground or the Southern Region network.

On 24 July 2012, car 7007 was designated as the Olympic 2012 Train with London Underground Chief Operating Officer Howard Collins carrying the Olympic Torch from Wimbledon to Wimbledon Park. This is the only London Underground train to be an Olympic Torch train.

In March 2017 the first D stock RAT (Rail Adhesion Train) was designated to replace the A60/A62 Stock trains which were currently working as Rail Adhesion Trains. The A stock units were 50+ years old at that point and were ageing rapidly. There are two 5-car sets formed 7010-8123-17010-8010-7123 and 7040-8107-17040-8040-7107.

== Roster ==
Formation	← Ealing Broadway/Richmond/Wimbledon (A) Upminster (D) →						Notes
Formation	7xxx (DM)	17xxx (T)	8xxx (UNDM)	8xxx (UNDM)	17xxx (T)	7xxx (DM)	Notes
Facilities	Wheelchair bays	Wheelchair bays	Wheelchair bays	Wheelchair bays	Wheelchair bays	Wheelchair bays	Notes
Numbers	7000 ∥ 7128	17000 ∥ 17128	8000 ∥ 8128	8001 ∥ 8129	17001 ∥ 17129	7001 ∥ 7129	17035 and 17077 exchanged numbers in 1994.

Formation	← (A) (D) →		
Formation	75xx (DM)	175xx (T)	75xx (DM)
Facilities	Wheelchair space	Wheelchair space	Wheelchair space
Numbers	7500 ∥ 7538	17500 ∥ 17538	7501 ∥ 7539

- - Wheelchair space
- DM - Driving Motor car
- T - Trailer (non-powered) car
- UNDM - Uncoupling Non-Driving Motor car

De-icing equipment was fitted to trailers 17000 to 17048 (evens).

== Refurbishment ==
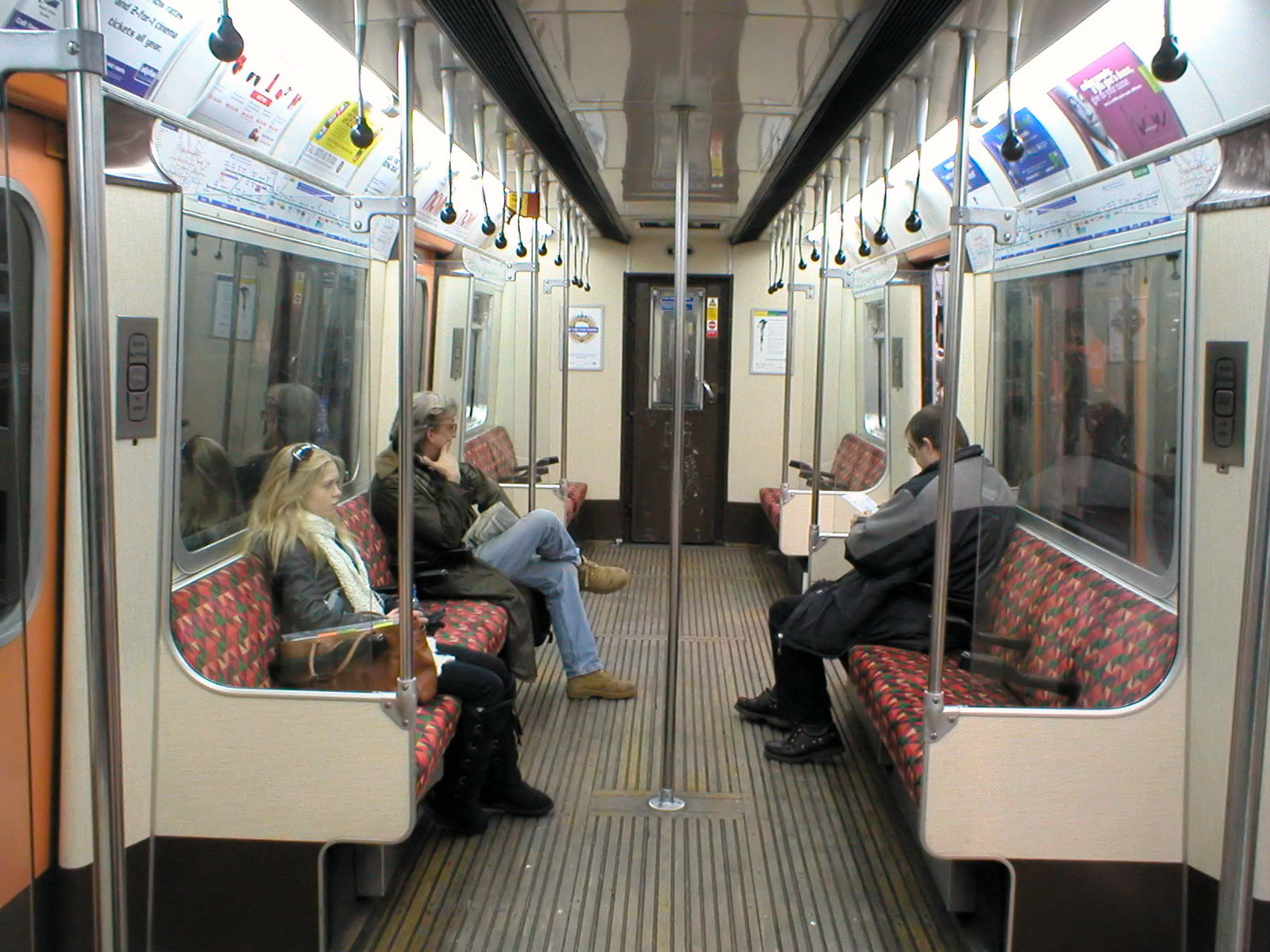
Interior before refurbishment

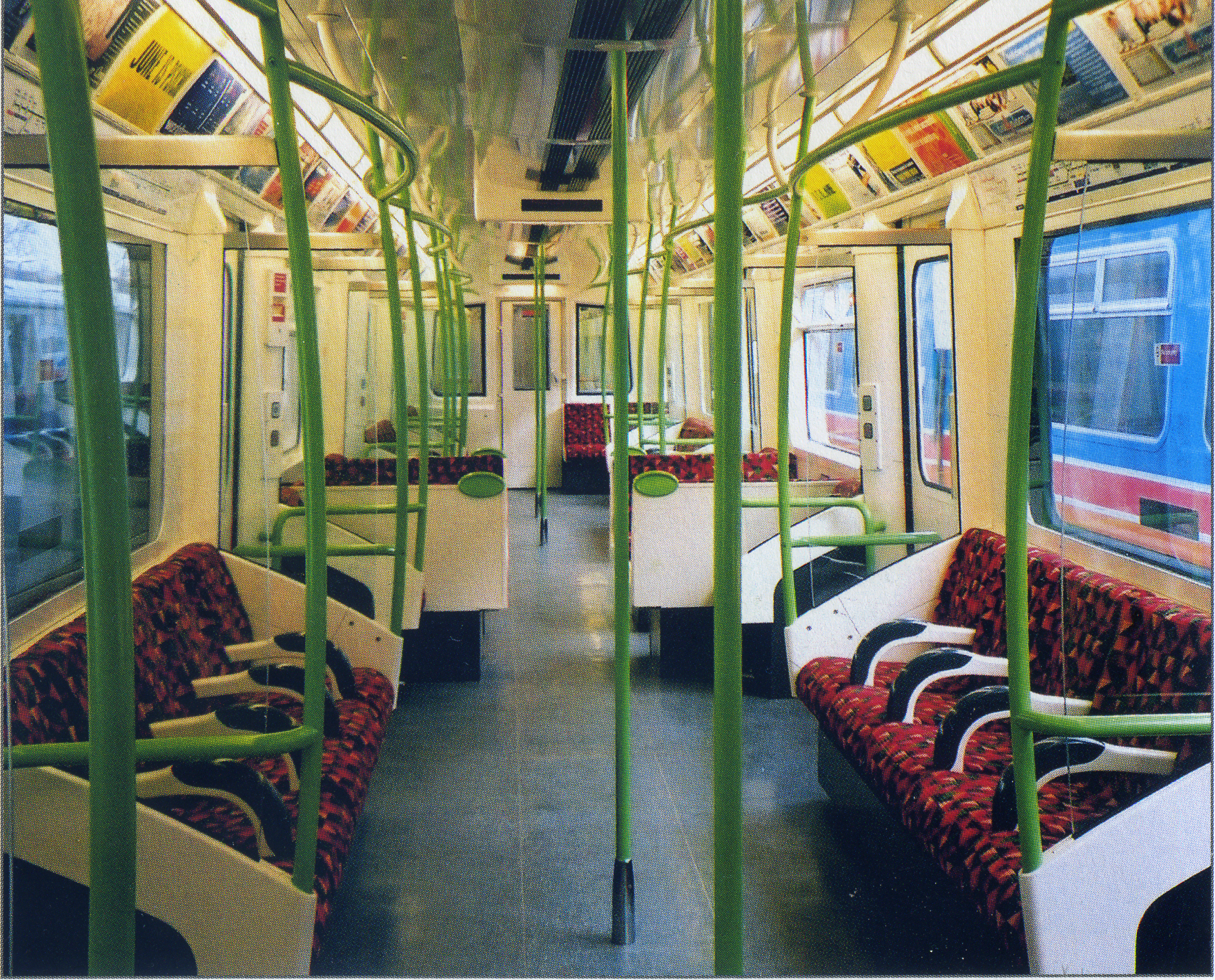
Interior of the prototype refurbished car

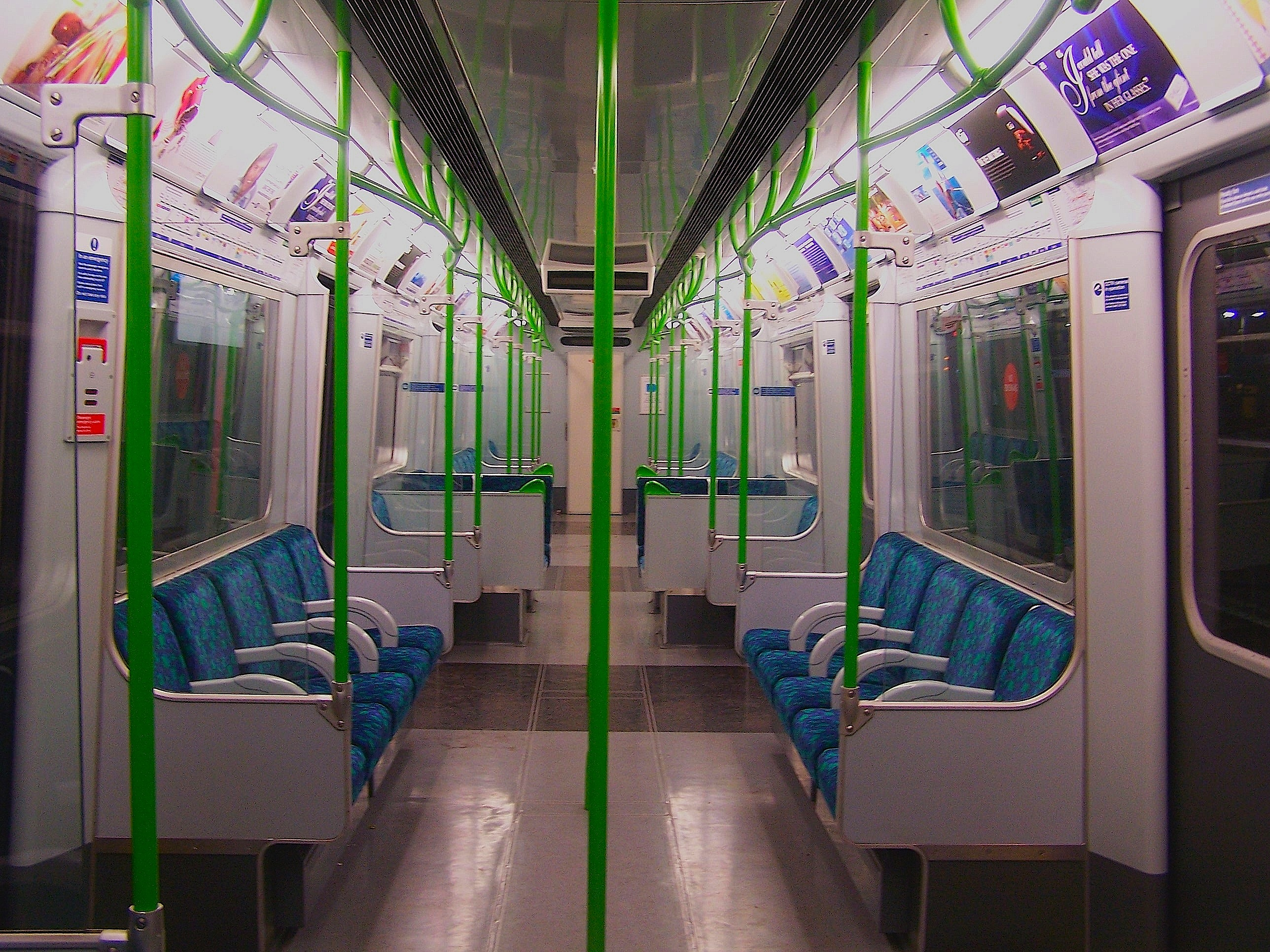
Interior after refurbishment

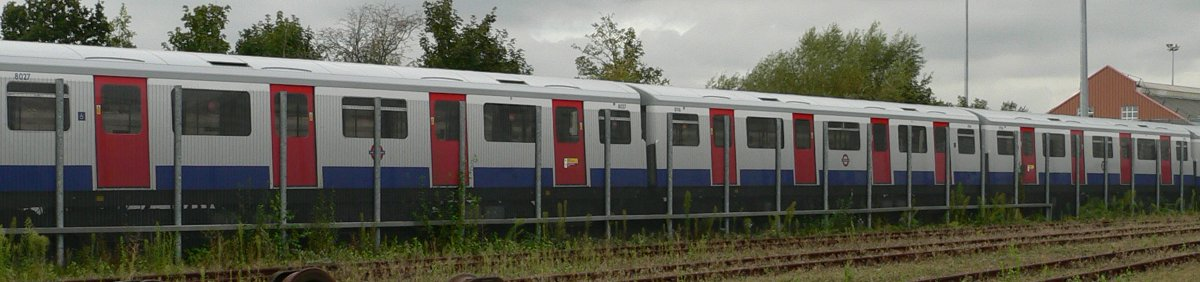
The exterior of a newly refurbished train at Ealing Common Depot in 2005

The mid-life refurbishment was the first to be carried out under the public–private partnership (PPP), by Metronet, and was delayed until contract negotiations were completed. A prototype unit of three cars (7008/17008/8008) was prepared by London Underground's Train Modification Unit at Acton Depot in 2001. This had some detail differences from the eventual refurbishment, and was later brought up to the standard of the rest of the stock. The refurbishment programme began in summer 2005 with the work undertaken by Bombardier Transportation's Derby Litchurch Lane Works. The programme was completed in 2008.

The refurbishment consisted of:

- Applying London Underground livery with anti-vandal paint and window film
- Restyling the interiors in green and white with silver door painting on the insides instead of orange and also change to the seat moquette.
- Replacing maple wood flooring with rubber
- Adding buzzers to the doors both when opening and closing
- Adding end-of-car windows
- Replacing hanging straps (bobbles on springs) with grab bars
- Covering the door buttons on exteriors
- Adding dot matrix indicators showing the station and destination on the inside and exterior front and sides
- Adding an audio passenger information system guided by GPS and odometer, voiced by Emma Clarke: announcements for each station name include connecting lines, and provide warnings to "mind the gap between the train and the platform"
- Adding two tip-up seats/disabled multi purpose area
- Fitting air conditioning to driver's cab
- Fitting CCTV

The refurbished D Stock were the first Underground trains to have electronic dot-matrix information displays on the sides of the cars; some pre-war trains had slot-in or reversible destination or non-stopping plates. It was also the first type in the subsurface fleet to sound buzzers even when the door opens. The rest of the refurbished sub surface stock only had buzzers when the doors closed.

The refurbished D Stock also had the London Underground roundel painted on the sides of all the cars; previously, only the DM cars had the roundel on them.

Around 2014, the emergency cords were fitted with flap coverings as a safety measure so that passengers only pull the cords in case of emergency.

== Withdrawal ==
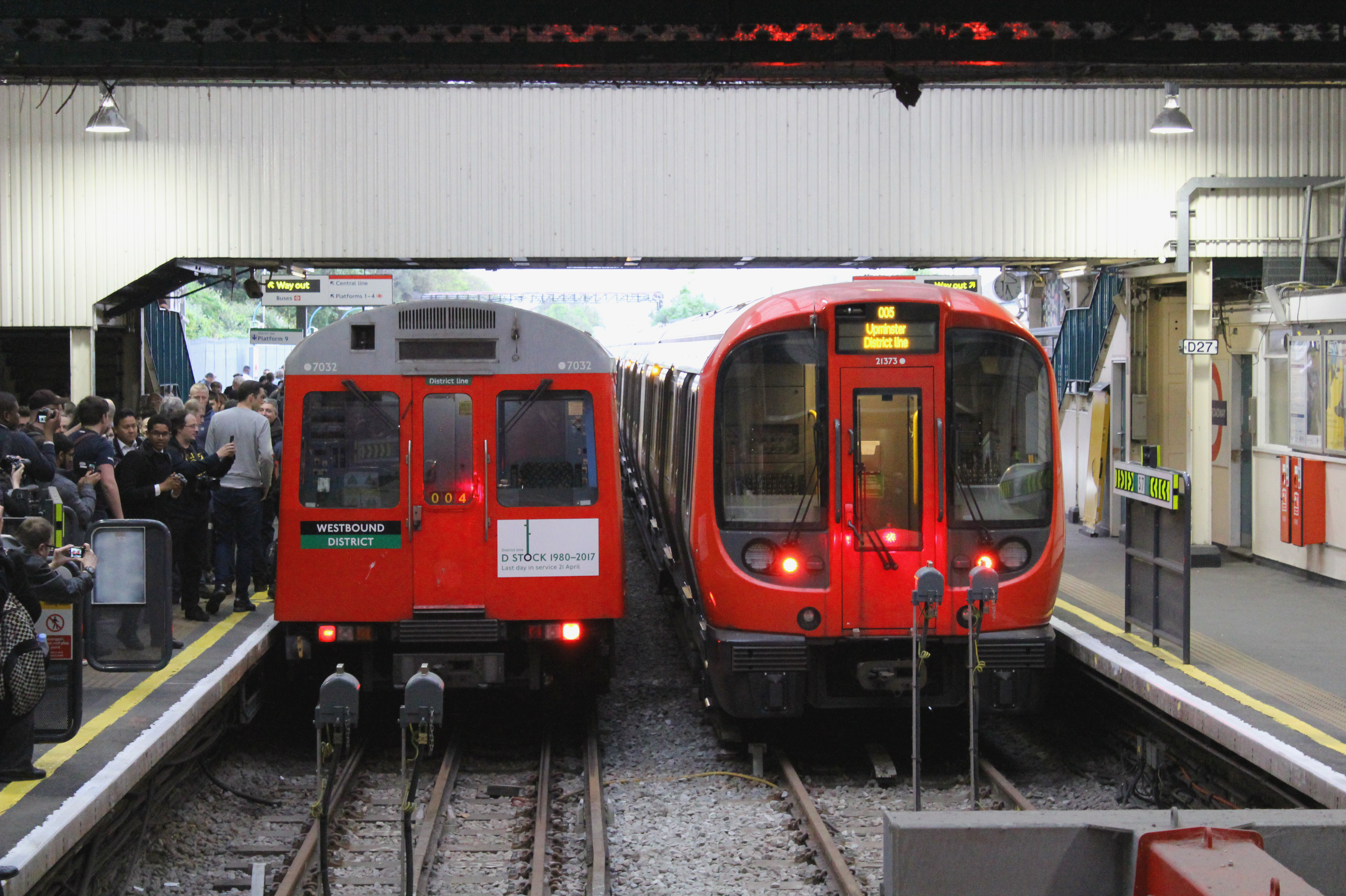
The D78 Stock and its replacement, the S7 Stock, at Ealing Broadway on the final day of D78 Stock operation.

Withdrawals commenced on 19 January 2015 when the first full 6-car train, formed of units 7510 and 7058, was withdrawn from service at Ealing Common Depot and loaded onto trucks for Long Marston for the driving motors to be converted into 230s and the other cars to be either scrapped or stored for future use. The last train, formed of units 7007 and 7032, ran on 21 April 2017.

In February 2016, four redundant D78 cars were used by the emergency services in a mock tube accident staged at Littlebrook Power Station.

Carriage 7027 is preserved at Coopers Lane School, Lewisham for use as a library.

== Use following withdrawal ==
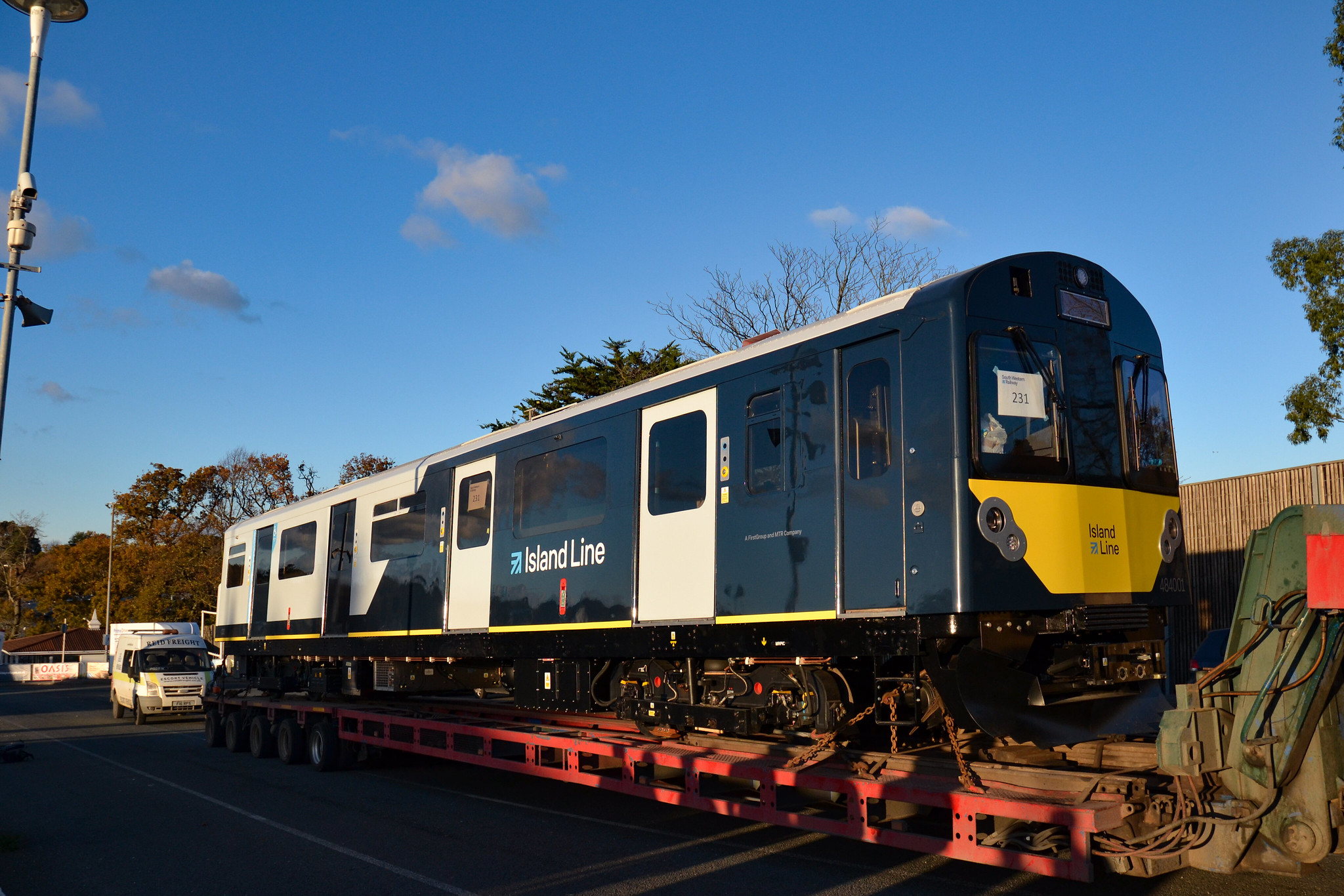
Class 484 carriage 231 ready to enter service

In 2014 Vivarail purchased 156 driving motor cars and 70 trailer vehicles for conversion to diesel–electric multiple units. A total of 75 two or three-car units were proposed. Under TOPS they are designated as Class 230.

A prototype was produced for testing and accreditation in August 2015, with introduction to service in 2016. The first Class 230 service to carry passengers operated on 19 July 2017 when a unit was used to operate a shuttle service from Honeybourne to the Rail Live exhibition at the Quinton Rail Technology Centre.

The first customer for production Class 230 units was West Midlands Trains, which ordered three two-car DMUs in October 2017. Subsequently Transport for Wales Rail ordered a total of five three-car sets, to be built as bi-mode multiple units (BMMUs), in June 2018.

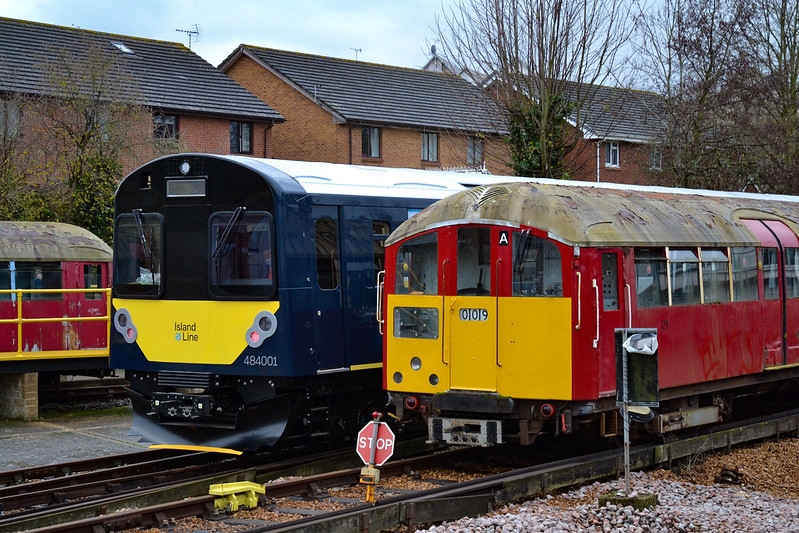
ex-D78 Stock Class 484 no. 484001 at Ryde Traincare Depot alongside ex-1938 Tube Stock Class 483 no. 483009

In September 2019 South Western Railway announced that it would be leasing five two-car units from Vivarail for use on the upgraded Island Line on the Isle of Wight from 2020. Designated Class 484, these continue to be powered by electricity drawn from the third rail. The first units arrived on the Isle of Wight on 19 November 2020, and entered service on 1 November 2021 once upgrade works on the island line were completed. While the 484s are considerably taller than the 483s they replaced, a survey of the line prior to the commencement of upgrade works confirmed that the new units would be able to traverse Ryde Tunnel, a requirement for any stock to run on the Island Line.
