= Hampden Academy =

Public school in Maine, United States

Location
- 89 Western Avenue; Hampden, Maine 04444; United States
- Coordinates: 44°44′32″N 68°50′38″W

Information
- Type: Public secondary
- Motto: "Nulla vestigia retrorsum." ("Never a step backward.")
- Established: 1803; 223 years ago
- School district: Regional School Unit #22 (R.S.U. 22)
- Principal: Reg Ruhlin
- Grades: 9–12
- Colors: Purple and White
- Mascot: Broncos
- Accreditation: New England Association of Schools and Colleges
- Website: ha.rsu22.us

Hampden Academy is a public high school located at 89 Western Avenue in Hampden, Maine, United States. The school is a part of Regional School Unit #22 (R.S.U. 22), with approximately 708 students from Hampden, Newburgh, Frankfort and Winterport attending grades 9–12. It has been accredited by the New England Association of Schools and Colleges.

The school mascot is the Bronco.

== History ==
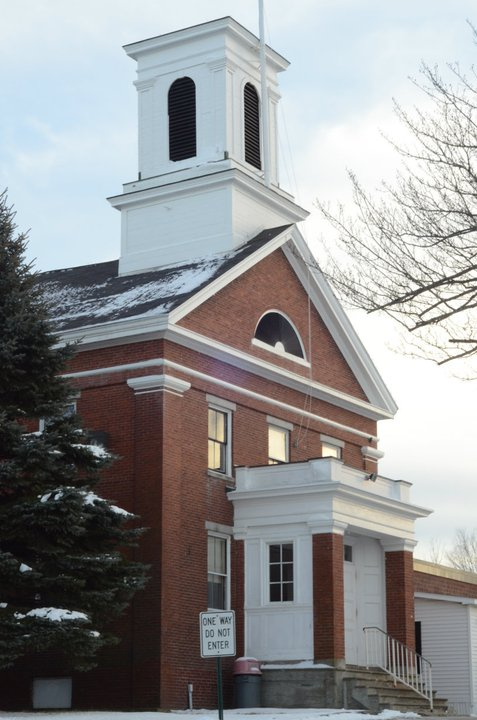
The original Academy building

Hampden Academy was founded in 1803. It became a member of SAD 22 in 1969 (changed to RSU 22 in 2013). It still serves as a public school that educates students from Hampden, Winterport, Frankfort, and Newburgh. The original Hampden Academy building, located across US 1A and now part of the McGraw School, is on the National Register of Historic Places. A new $51.6 million building, located behind the FieldTurf complex, was completed in 2012.

The front lawn of the 1 Main Road North location was the site of the Battle of Hampden during the War of 1812.

== Notable alumni ==
- Hiram Batchelder, Civil War soldier and Mayor of Chico, California
- Dillon Bates, former member of the Maine House of Representatives
- Mike Bordick, baseball player
- Ricky Craven, NASCAR driver, ESPN correspondent
- Matthew Gagnon, think tank executive, writer and radio host
- Jeffrey Hjelm, Maine Supreme Court Justice
- Cyrus Hamlin, Civil War General and Politician
- Frederick Low, Member of the U.S. House of Representatives in California and later governor of California
- Lewis Mayo, Minnesota state senator
- Tanya Ryno (Tanya Grondin 1988), Saturday Night Live producer
- Jim Spohrer (1974), computer programmer
- Charles Stetson, Member of the U.S. House of Representatives from Maine's 6th district
- Michael Thibodeau (1984), Maine State Senate President
- Scott Zoldi (1989), FICO Chief Analytics Officer
