= Lewis Mayo =

Lewis Mayo may refer to:

- Lewis Mayo (politician) (1828–1907), American politician
- Lewis Mayo (footballer) (born 2000), Scottish footballer
