= Senator Mayo =

Senator Mayo may refer to:

- Arthur Mayo (politician) (1936–2015), Maine State Senate
- Lewis Mayo (politician) (1828–1907), Minnesota State Senate
- Nathan Mayo (1876–1960), Florida State Senate
- William B. Mayo (politician) (1854–1930), Vermont State Senate
- William Worrall Mayo (1819–1911), Minnesota State Senate
