= Washington County Jail (Maine) =

- U.S. National Register of Historic Places
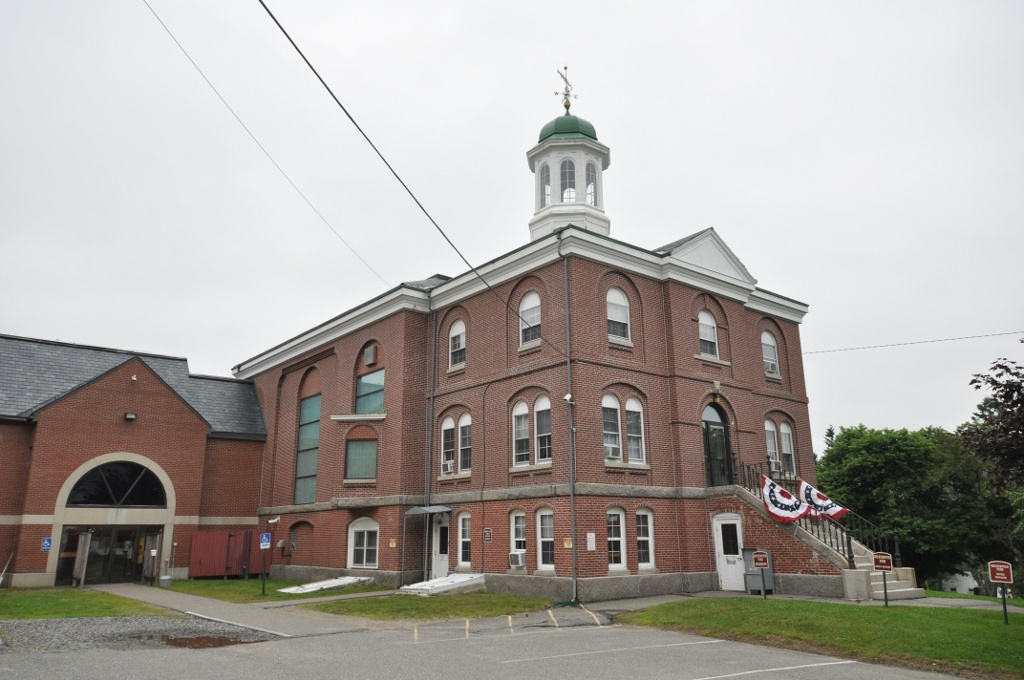

- Location within Maine Location within the United States
- Location: 83 Court St., Machias, Maine
- Coordinates: 44°42′58″N 67°27′35″W
- Area: less than one acre
- Built: 1858
- Architect: Bryant, Gridley J.F.
- Architectural style: Italianate
- NRHP reference No.: 88000393
- Added to NRHP: April 7, 1988

The Washington County Jail is located at 83 Court Street in Machias, the county seat of Washington County, Maine. The jail was built in 1858 to a design by Gridley James Fox Bryant, and is one of the county's architecturally significant Italianate buildings. It was listed on the National Register of Historic Places in 1988.

== Description and history ==
The Washington County Jail is located in the center of Machias, on the north side of Court Street, midway between Center and Cooper Streets. It shares the block with the Washington County Courthouse, to which it is connected by a modern ell at the rear. The jail is a three-story brick building with a hip roof and a granite foundation. A gabled entrance pavilion projects slightly from the south-facing front, and there is a cupola at the center of the original building, which has been greatly enlarged by a modern addition to the rear. The main entrance is on the second floor, which is separated from the first by a granite string course. Windows and doors on the upper floors are set in recessed panels, rounded on the third floor and arched on the second. The rounded-arch paneling is continued in a sympathetic way in the modern addition.

The jail was built in 1858 to a design by Boston architect Gridley James Fox Bryant, who designed a significant number of public facilities in eastern Maine in the 1850s, including the similar Kennebec County Jail. At that time, his design embodied the latest thinking in jail facilities, with the jailor's living quarters in the front portion of the building, and cell blocks to the rear, surrounded by guard galleries. Innovations in the building included state-of-the-art ventilation and communications systems, and self-locking doors. Much of the building's original interior has been altered, owing to intervening changings in incarceration practice and theory.

== See also ==
- National Register of Historic Places listings in Washington County, Maine
