= Brian Duprey =

American politician

Brian Duprey (born February 12, 1967) is a 5 term Maine State Representative from Hampden. Duprey, a Republican, served in the Maine House of Representatives from 2000 to 2008. After a four-year absence from politics was re-elected to his 5th term in 2012. Duprey is the longest serving State Representative representing the town of Hampden. From 2001 to 2003 Duprey served on the Hampden Town Council.

Duprey has sponsored many bills to become law, most notably the bill that makes it a crime punishable by 25 years in prison to commit an assault on a pregnant woman that results in the unborn baby's death. He also sponsored a bill that makes it a crime to smoke in a car with children.

Duprey has made radio appearances on the Al Franken Radio Show, The Tony Snow Radio Show, the Rush Limbaugh Program, and he has also done TV appearances on The O'Reilly Factor and The Daily Show with Jon Stewart.

Outside of his political life Duprey is self-employed and resides in Hampden, Maine with his wife Carol Duprey.

== Early life ==
After graduating from Lawrence High School in Fairfield, Maine in 1985 Duprey served in the United States Navy for eight years, reaching the rank of E6. An Integrated Undersea Surveillance System (IUSS) Specialist, Duprey was an Anti-Submarine Warfare Specialist during the Cold War. In the Navy he earned several awards including the Navy Achievement Medal and an Admiral's Letter of Commendation for saving a shipmates life. Duprey left the Navy in 1993 and moved with his family to Hampden, Maine.
