= Phil Brown =

Phil Brown may refer to:

- Phil Brown (actor) (1916–2006), American stage, film, and TV actor
- Phil Brown (basketball coach), Australian basketball coach
- Phil Brown (footballer, born 1959), English football manager and former player
- Phil Brown (footballer, born 1966), English player-manager with Matlock Town
- Phil Brown (skier) (born 1991), Canadian slalom skier
- Phil Brown (sprinter) (born 1962), British runner, Olympic Games medalist
- Phil Brown (American football) (1901–1991), American college football and basketball coach

== See also ==
- Philip Brown (disambiguation)
