= Harmony Hall (Hampden, Maine) =

- U.S. National Register of Historic Places
- Location within Maine Location within the United States
- Location: 24 Kennebec Rd., Hampden, Maine
- Coordinates: 44°43′57″N 68°50′40″W
- Area: 0.2 acres (0.081 ha)
- Built: 1896
- Architectural style: Greek Revival, Gothic Revival
- NRHP reference No.: 07000596
- Added to NRHP: June 27, 2007

Harmony Hall is a historic religious and civic building at 24 Kennebec Road in Hampden, Maine. Built in 1829 as a Universalist church and restyled in 1896, it is a fine example of Greek Revival and Gothic Revival architecture, with a long history as a site for community events. It was listed on the National Register of Historic Places in 2007.

== Description and history ==
Harmony Hall is set on the north side of Kennebec Road in Hampden Highlands, a short way west of United States Route 1A. It is a rectangular wood frame structure, with a front-facing gable roof, mostly clapboard siding, and a granite foundation. Its front facade, facing south, is symmetrically arranged, with three bays separated by pilasters. The outer bays have entrances with relatively plain surrounds crowned by corniced entablatures. The central bay is taken up by a three-stage tower. The first stage is open, with Gothic lancet-arched openings, and is finished in flushboarding. The tall second stage has lancet-arched windows, and is finished in bands of decoratively cut wooden shingles. The third stage has an open belfry with lancet-arched openings, and is finished in clapboards. The tower is topped by a shallow-pitched pyramidal roof and weathervane. The bell, manufactured by the Revere Company in 1827, was a gift from Martin Kinsley.

The hall was built in 1829 as a church for a local Universalist congregation, and was the first building in town dedicated to the use of a single congregation. It was used by that congregation until its membership declined, and it was closed in 1885. The local Village Improvement Society purchased the building in 1895, and renovated it for use as a community and society hall. Alterations included the removal of the original (deteriorating) belfry, replacing it with the present tower. The original box pews were removed from the interior, and a kitchen was added. The building has since served as a focal point for local social groups, particularly those involved in progressive causes such as women's suffrage, and is also used for community events.

== See also ==
- National Register of Historic Places listings in Penobscot County, Maine
