= Carolyn Hopkins =

American announcer

- Born: 1948 (age 77–78); Louisville, Kentucky, U.S
- Occupation: Public Service Announcer
- Years active: 1980s–present

Carolyn Hopkins (born c. 1948) is an American public service announcer. Her recorded voice announcements are heard in major transportation systems around the world.

== Career ==
Hopkins's recorded announcements range from service status updates to unattended baggage policy announcements and safety tips. Her voice can be heard in more than 200 airports over the world, including Newark Liberty International Airport, LaGuardia Airport, John F. Kennedy International Airport, Pittsburgh International Airport, Baltimore Washington International Airport Incheon International Airport, Dallas Fort Worth International Airport, Charles de Gaulle Airport, Mérida International Airport, and Denver International Airport. She has also recorded for such public transit systems as the New York City Subway, the Staten Island Ferry, Grand Central Terminal, and the Paris Métro.

Originally from Louisville, Kentucky, Hopkins now lives in Hampden, Maine. Her first voice recording was for RCA in Indianapolis, while her first airport service announcement was for O'Hare International Airport.

When co-founder Hardy Martin and three other partners started IED (Innovative Electronic Designs), they chose Hopkins as one of their first voices. It was for Typhoon Lagoon at Disney World in Florida in 1989.

Hopkins records all the public address announcements from her home studio in Hampden, Maine and sends them via email. Hopkins was named one of the 500 most important people in history by Mental Floss Magazine in December 2015.

According to Hopkins, she has ridden the New York City Subway just once, in 1957.

As of 2016, Hopkins still records for IED from her home.

== See also ==
- Emma Clarke, the voice on a majority of the London Underground
- Bernie Wagenblast, another voice on the New York City Subway, AirTrain JFK and AirTrain Newark
