= Judge Brown =

Judge Brown may refer to:

- Ada Brown (judge) (born 1974), judge of the United States District Court for the Northern District of Texas
- Addison Brown (1830–1913), judge of the United States District Court for the Southern District of New York
- Anna J. Brown (born 1952), judge of the United States District Court for the District of Oregon
- Arthur Lewis Brown (1854–1928), judge of the United States District Court for the District of Rhode Island
- Bailey Brown (1917–2004), judge of the United States Court of Appeals for the Sixth Circuit
- Debra M. Brown (born 1963), judge of the United States District Court for the Northern District of Mississippi
- Garrett Brown Jr. (born 1943), judge of the United States District Court for the District of New Jersey
- Gary R. Brown (born 1963), judge of the United States District Court for the Eastern District of New York
- George Stewart Brown (1871–1941), judge of the United States Customs Court
- Henry Billings Brown (1836–1913), judge of the United States District Court for the Eastern District of Michigan, later elevated to the United States Supreme Court
- Janice Rogers Brown (born 1949), judge of the United States Court of Appeals for the District of Columbia Circuit
- Jeff Brown (judge) (born 1970), judge for the United States District Court for the Southern District of Texas
- Joe Brown (judge), (born 1947), American lawyer and television personality
  - Judge Joe Brown, American arbitration-based reality court show starring Joe Brown
- John Robert Brown (judge) (1909–1993), judge of the United States Court of Appeals for the Fifth Circuit
- Michael Lawrence Brown (born 1968), judge of the United States District Court for the Northern District of Georgia
- Mick Brown (judge) (1937–2015), judge of the District Court of New Zealand
- Morgan Welles Brown (1800–1853), judge of the United States District Courts for the Eastern, Middle, and Western Districts of Tennessee
- Nannette Jolivette Brown (born 1963), Chief judge of the United States District Court for the Eastern District of Louisiana
- Paul Neeley Brown (1926–2012), judge of the United States District Court for the Eastern District of Texas
- R. Lewis Brown (1892–1948), judge of the United States District Court for the District of Montana
- Willis Brown (1881–1931), removed Utah juvenile court judge
- Wesley E. Brown (1907–2012), judge of the United States District Court for the District of Kansas

== See also ==
- Justice Brown (disambiguation)
