= Wilbur N. Taylor =

U.S. Army soldier (1846–1903)

Wilbur Nelson Taylor
- Born: December 2, 1846; Hampden, Maine, U.S.
- Died: November 20, 1903 (aged 56); Minneapolis, Minnesota, U.S.
- Burial place: Lakewood Cemetery
- Military career
- Allegiance: United States of America
- Branch: United States Army
- Service years: c. 1868–c. 1870
- Rank: Sergeant
- Unit: 8th U.S. Cavalry
- Conflicts: Indian Wars
- Awards: Medal of Honor

Wilbur Nelson Taylor (December 2, 1846 – November 20, 1903) was an American soldier in the U.S. Army who served with the 8th U.S. Cavalry during the Indian Wars. He was one of eight men who received the Medal of Honor for "bravery in scouts and actions with indians" while fighting the Apache in the Arizona Territory during 1868 and 1869.

== Biography ==
Wilbur Nelson Taylor was born in Hampden, Maine on December 2, 1846. He later enlisted in the U.S. Army in Boston, Massachusetts and was sent out west to the frontier. As a member of the 8th U.S. Cavalry, he participated in the campaign against the Apache in the Arizona Territory during 1868 and 1869. He distinguished himself in battle and, with eight other soldiers, received the Medal of Honor for "bravery in scouts and actions with indians" on September 6, 1869. The other members of his regiment to receive the award included Sgt. Francis C. Green, Cpl. Jacob Gunther, Cpl. David A. Matthews, Sgt. James McNally, Sgt. John Moriarity, Pvt. Samuel Richman and Pvt. Otto Smith. Taylor married a Miss Leavey of Boston in 1883. They had three sons. He died at his home on 5th Avenue in Minneapolis, Minnesota, on November 20, 1903, at age 56. He was buried in Lakewood Cemetery.

== Medal of Honor citation ==
Rank and organization: Corporal, Company K, 8th U.S. Cavalry. Place and date: Arizona, 1868 and 1869. Entered service at: ------. Birth: Hamden, Maine. Date of issue: 6 September 1869.

Citation:

Bravery in actions with Indians.

== See also ==
- List of Medal of Honor recipients
