= Old Hampden Academy Building =

- Hampden Academy
- U.S. National Register of Historic Places
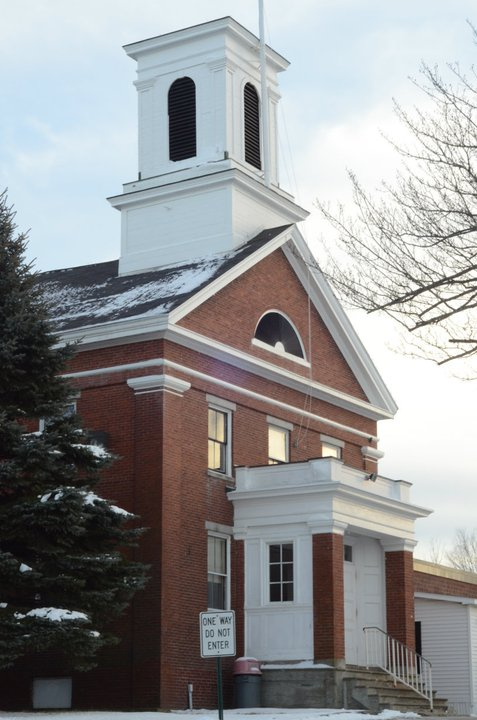

- Location within Maine Location within the United States
- Location: U.S. 1A, Hampden, Maine
- Coordinates: 44°44′24″N 68°50′17″W
- Area: 1 acre (0.40 ha)
- Built: 1842
- Architect: Stuart, James H.
- Architectural style: Greek Revival
- NRHP reference No.: 75000106
- Added to NRHP: September 11, 1975

The Old Hampden Academy Building is a historic school building on United States Route 1A in Hampden, Maine. Built in 1842-43, it was the home of Hampden Academy, now the town's public high school, for many years. The building is now part the campus of the McGraw School, a local elementary school. It was listed on the National Register of Historic Places in 1975 for its educational and architectural significance.

== Description and history ==
The former Hampden Academy building stands on the west side of US Route 1A in Hampden village, just south of its junction with Cottage Street. It stands at the back of a semicircular drive that is now almost completely surrounded by parking for the McGraw School, whose modern section is attached to the rear of this building. The academy building is a 2 1/2-story brick building, with a front-facing gable roof and granite foundation. A square tower rises above the roof ridge, with a short first stage, and a taller belfry stage with louvered round-arch openings. The front (west-facing) facade is symmetrical, three bays wide, with a projecting entry vestibule in the center bay, and a fully pedimented gable with a half-round louver at its center. The entry has pilasters at all four corners (as does the building) and the entrance is recessed in a paneled opening, with a balustrade balcony above.

Hampden Academy was established in 1803 and constructed its first building on this site in 1806. That building was destroyed by fire in February 1842, and the present building was built soon thereafter. It is one of a handful of brick Greek Revival academy buildings, resembling the Bloomfield Academy in Skowhegan (1840) and the Somerset Academy in Athens. It was damaged by fire in 1854, and briefly closed due to low enrollment in the 1880s. It has been used since then as a classroom facility by the Hampden Academy and the local school district.

== See also ==
- National Register of Historic Places listings in Penobscot County, Maine
