= Philip Marshall Brown =

American educator and diplomat

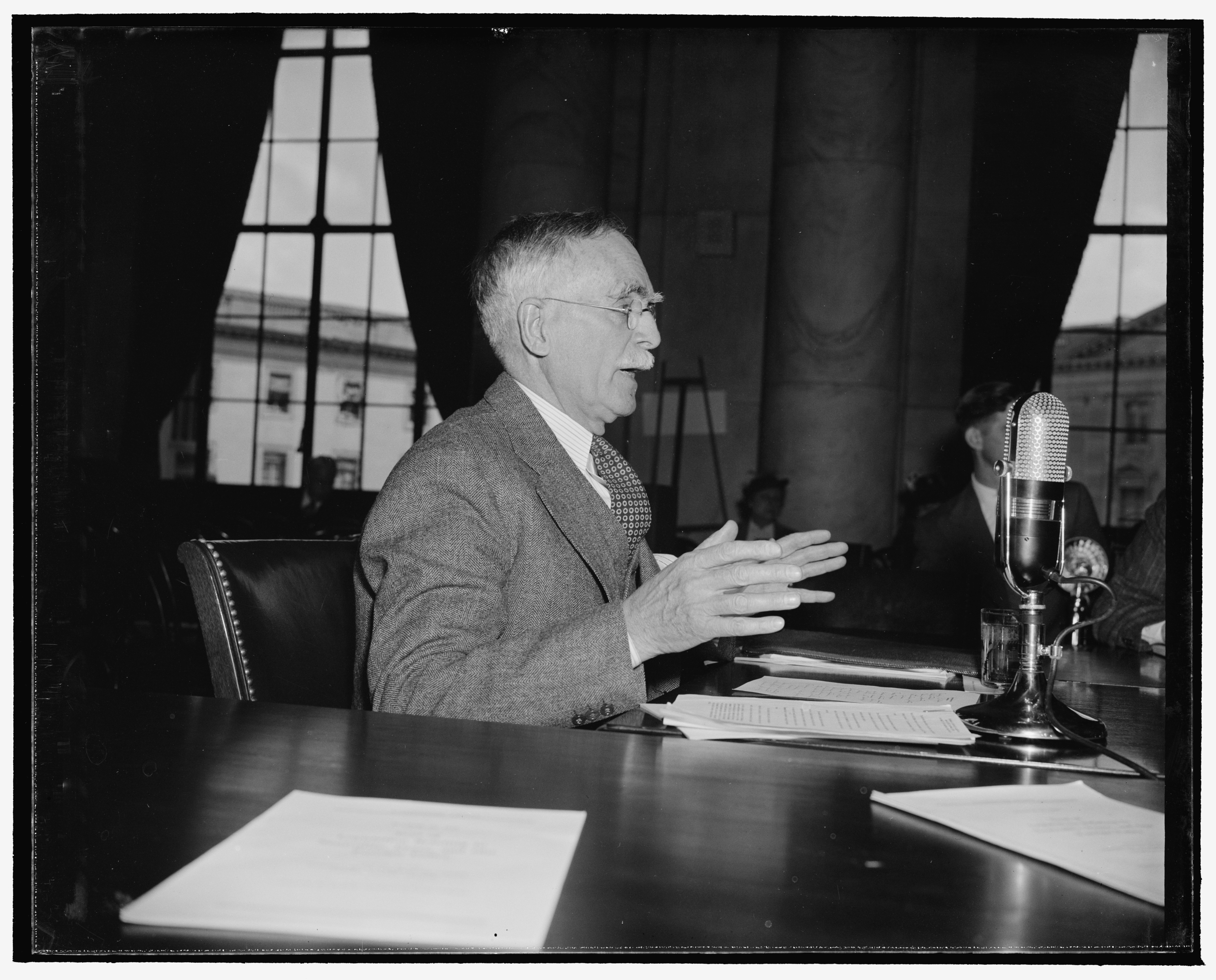
Brown in 1939

Philip Marshall Brown (July 31, 1875 – May 10, 1966, Willamstown, Massachusetts) was an American educator and diplomat, born at Hampden, Maine, and educated at Williams College.

In 1900–1901, he served as secretary to Lloyd C. Griscom and from 1901 to 1903 was second secretary for the American Legation of Istanbul. He served as Secretary of legation to Guatemala and Honduras, 1903–1907, and as secretary of the American Embassy of Istanbul, 1907–1908. From the latter year to 1910 he was minister to Honduras. Resigning from the diplomatic service, he was appointed instructor in international law at Harvard University in 1912 and in the following year became assistant professor of international law and diplomacy at Princeton, where he was later appointed professor of international law (1915). He taught at Princeton until his retirement in 1935.

He was associate editor of the American Journal of International Law and was an associate member of the Institute of International Law at Brussels. He was the author of Foreigners in Turkey (1914), International Realities (1917), International Society (1923), etc.

Brown also served as the president of the American Peace Society, which publishes World Affairs, the oldest U.S. journal on international relations.
