= Philip F. Brown =

American politician

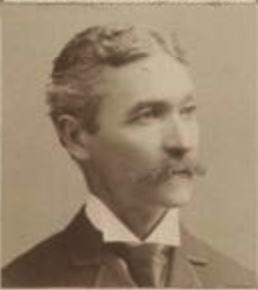

Member of the Virginia House of Delegates from Botetourt County
- In office December 2, 1891 – December 6, 1893

Personal details
- Born: Philip Francis Brown; June 2, 1842
- Died: March 24, 1921 (aged 78)
- Political party: Democratic
- Spouse: Nannie Adams

Military service
- Allegiance: Confederate States
- Branch/service: Confederate States Army
- Rank: Private
- Unit: 12th Virginia Infantry
- Battles/wars: American Civil War

Philip Francis Brown (June 2, 1842 – March 24, 1921) was an American politician who served in the Virginia House of Delegates.
