= Emma Clarke =

British voice-over artist

Emma Clarke (born 1971) is an English writer of comedy and drama scripts, radio presenter and voice-over artist, best known as the voice of the automated messages on the Bakerloo, Central and Waterloo & City lines of the London Underground. Most of Clarke's work has been used in television commercials and radio outside the United Kingdom, notably in the Netherlands, Australia, and the United States.

She was also the presenter of Saturday breakfast on BBC Radio 3.

== Early life ==
Emma Clarke was born and raised in Sale, Cheshire (now part of Greater Manchester). She started a theatre company at age 17 which specialised in training for businesses and groups in both the public and private sector. On graduation she worked for BBC Light Entertainment, where she wrote and performed poetry, prose, and drama.

Her father spotted an advert looking for voice over artists in the Sale and Altrincham Messenger; after failing her first interview, she studied the art for two years before gaining her first paid work.

== Career ==
In 1998, Clarke was approached by a media company representing one of the three companies that operated parts of the London Underground, who were looking for a replacement automated customer announcer. After 18 months of focus-group testing, in which her voice was dubbed "Marilyn", she was awarded a contract to produce announcements in 1999. She was dismissed by London Underground in 2007 after posting a series of spoof announcements, mocking tourists and commuters, on her own website. Between 2009 and 2017 her voice was replaced on the Circle, District, Hammersmith & City and Victoria lines by announcements voiced by Sarah Parnell, with her voice on the Central Line being replaced by Adrian Hieatt due to the refurbishments.

Her other clients include the BBC, Gillette, Virgin, Classic FM, Homebase and Three UK. Along with her solo work, she is the managing director of Just Add Voice, a company which provides voice-over tracks.

In 2016, she voiced the starship Avalon in the Sony Pictures film Passengers, which starred Jennifer Lawrence and Chris Pratt. In 2023, she voiced The Lift in Channel 4’s reality TV show Rise and Fall.

In October 2024, she started presenting Saturday breakfast on BBC Radio 3.

== Personal life ==
Clarke, her husband, and their two children live in Altrincham, Greater Manchester.

== See also ==
- Mind the gap
- Carolyn Hopkins, the voice behind several major transportation systems around the world including the New York City Subway, John F. Kennedy International Airport and Charles de Gaulle Airport
