= Lloyd O. Brown =

American judge

Lloyd Odom Brown

Associate Justice of the Ohio Supreme Court
- In office December 7, 1971 – January 1, 1973
- Appointed by: John J. Gilligan
- Preceded by: Robert Morton Duncan
- Succeeded by: Paul W. Brown

Personal details
- Born: December 12, 1928 Little Rock, Arkansas, US
- Died: May 5, 1993 (aged 64) Cuyahoga County, Ohio, US
- Party: Democratic
- Spouse: Phyllis Brown
- Children: three
- Education: Ohio State University; Ohio State University College of Law

Military service
- Allegiance: United States
- Branch/service: United States Coast Guard
- Years of service: 1946–1949

Lloyd Odom Brown (1928–1993) was a Democratic lawyer from Ohio who was appointed to the Ohio Supreme Court.

== Early life and education ==
Lloyd Brown was born in Little Rock, Arkansas on December 12, 1928. His parents were William S., Sr. & Lillie Brown. They moved to Cleveland, Ohio in 1931. William Brown died in 1940, and Lloyd worked in the pressroom of the Call and Post newspaper and at his uncle's shoe store to help support the family.

Brown was a radioman in the United States Coast Guard from 1946 to 1949. He then worked in a potato chip factory and used veteran's educational benefits to pay for education at The Ohio State University, where he received bachelor's degrees in political science and law and a juris doctor in 1955.

== Career ==
Brown practiced law in Cleveland in 1955 with Theodore M. Williams. In 1956 and 1957 he practiced with Cleveland City Councilman Charles V. Carr. From 1958 to 1959 he was assistant attorney general under Ohio Attorney General William B. Saxbe. He became assistant Cuyahoga County prosecuting attorney in 1959, serving until 1967.

Brown was elected judge of the Cleveland Municipal Court in 1967. In 1971, Ohio Supreme Court justice Robert Morton Duncan was appointed to the federal bench, and Brown was appointed to the vacancy by Governor John J. Gilligan. In 1972, he ran for a six-year term on the court, but lost to Paul W. Brown.

On January 12, 1973, Governor Gilligan appointed Brown to the Cuyahoga County Court of Common Pleas. He was elected to a six-year term in 1974, and re-elected in 1980, but declined to run again in 1986.

In 1984, Governor Dick Celeste appointed Brown to the Ohio Board of Regents, where he served as secretary of the board at his death in 1993. He also was a partner at Weston, Hurd, Fallon, Paisley and Howley from 1987 to 1993.

== Personal life and death ==
Brown died one month short of retirement on May 5, 1993. He was survived by his wife, Phyllis Brown and three children.
