= Washington County Courthouse (Maine) =

- U.S. National Register of Historic Places
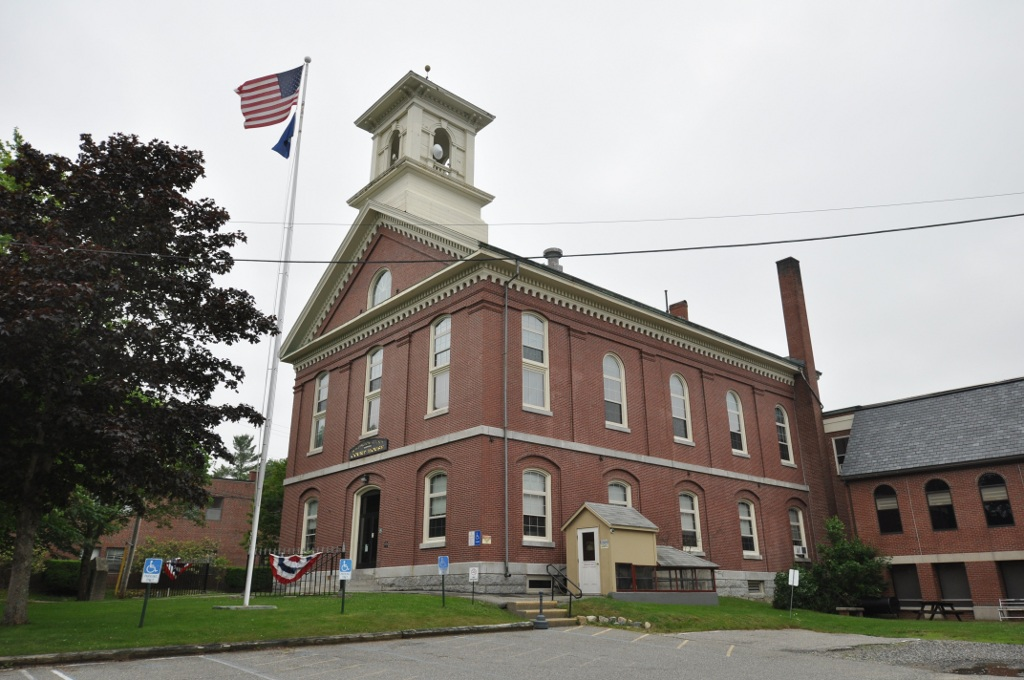
- Washington County Courthouse, 2013

- Location within Maine Location within the United States
- Location: 85 Court St., Machias, Maine
- Coordinates: 44°42′58″N 67°27′36″W
- Area: 2 acres (0.81 ha)
- Built: 1853
- Architect: Benjamin S. Deane
- Architectural style: Greek Revival, Italianate
- NRHP reference No.: 76000119
- Added to NRHP: November 7, 1976

The Washington County Courthouse is located at 85 Court Street in Machias, the county seat of Washington County, Maine. Now home to the Machias District Court and other county offices, it is an 1853 Italianate brick building designed by Benjamin S. Deane and listed on the National Register of Historic Places in 1976.

== Description and history ==
The Washington County Courthouse is located at the corner of Cooper and Court Streets in the center of Machias, between the Washington County Jail (to which it is now attached by a modern ell) and the local post office. It is a 2-1/2 story brick building, with a gabled roof and granite foundation. The roof is topped by a square tower whose second stage is an open belfry with round-arch openings and pilastered corners, with a bracketed cornice above. The front-facing gable is fully pedimented, with modillioned and dentillated eaves and cornice, and a round window at the center of the triangular pediment. First floor windows are set in segmented-arch openings that are surrounded by recessed panels. Second floor windows on the front and the first bay on the side are tall segmented-arch sash windows, that extend into the brickwork of the cornice, while other windows on the sides are shorter round-arch sash. The first and second floors are separated by a granite stringcourse, and the second-floor bays are articulated by brick pilasters.

The courthouse was built in 1853 to a design by Bangor architect Benjamin S. Deane, an apparently self-trained architect originally from Thomaston. Deane is one of the first professional architects known to be working in Down East Maine, and is also credited with the Waldo County courthouse, a similar transitional Greek Revival-Italianate design.

== See also ==
- National Register of Historic Places listings in Washington County, Maine
