= Hampden, Maine =

Town in Maine, United States

- Town
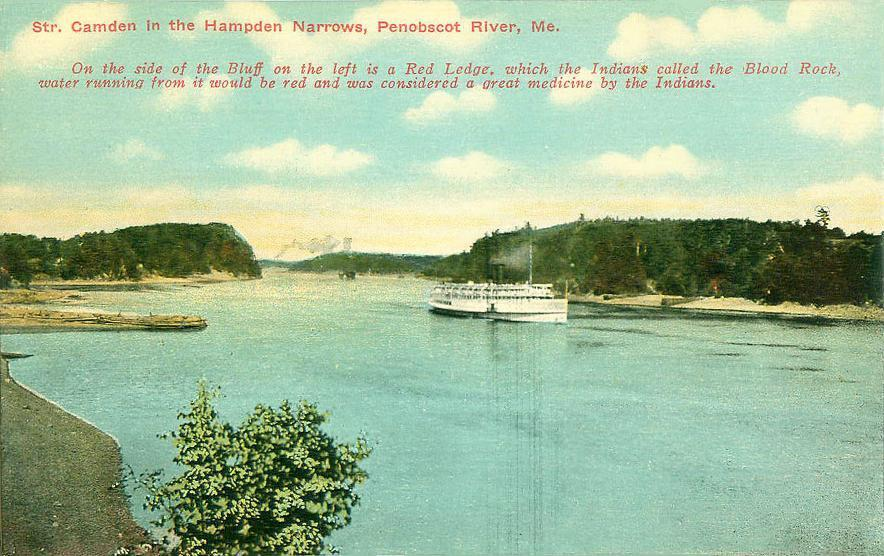
- Hampden Narrows on the Penobscot River, c. 1910

- Seal
- Motto: "The Community of Choice in Central Maine"
- Location within Maine Location within the United States
- Coordinates: 44°44′40″N 68°52′22″W
- Country: United States
- State: Maine
- County: Penobscot
- Settled: 1767
- Incorporated: 1794

Government
  - Type: Council/Mayor/Manager

Area
  - Total: 38.84 sq mi (100.60 km^{2})
  - Land: 37.94 sq mi (98.26 km^{2})
  - Water: 0.90 sq mi (2.33 km^{2})
- Elevation: 197 ft (60 m)

Population (2020)
  - Total: 7,709
  - Density: 203/sq mi (78.5/km^{2})
- Time zone: UTC-5 (Eastern (EST))
  - Summer (DST): UTC-4 (EDT)
- ZIP Code: 04444
- Area code: 207
- FIPS code: 23-30795
- GNIS feature ID: 582508
- Website: hampdenmaine.gov

Hampden is a town on the Penobscot River estuary in Penobscot County, Maine, United States. The population was 7,709 at the 2020 census. It contains a census-designated place of the same name. Hampden is part of the Bangor metropolitan statistical area.

== History ==
The town was originally called Wheelersborough after its original settler, Benjamin Wheeler. It was incorporated on February 24, 1794, and named after the English patriot John Hampden.

During the War of 1812, on September 3, 1814, about 400 local militia under the command of Brigadier General John Blake of nearby Brewer attempted to hold off a superior force of British regulars at Hampden. The American line, however, collapsed before a charge and was quickly routed. The Americans suffered one fatality with eleven wounded, and the British lost two (one an officer) but unfortunately a civilian spectator was also killed. The British fleet, which under command of Sir John Coape Sherbrooke (then lieutenant governor of Nova Scotia) had recently captured Castine, looted Hampden and nearby Bangor. They were trying to capture the USS Adams, a frigate with 750 men which had fled up the Penobscot River and anchored at Hampden. The crew of the Adams, under Captain Charles Morris, burned the ship to prevent her capture and subsequently escaped overland.

General Blake and two other officers, Lieutenant-Colonel Andrew Grant of Hampden and Major Joshua Chamberlain of Brewer (grandfather of Civil War general Joshua L. Chamberlain), were court-martialed in Bangor in 1816 for their part in the defeat. Blake and Chamberlain were both exonerated, but Grant was cashiered.

== Geography ==
According to the United States Census Bureau, the town has a total area of 38.84 square miles (100.60 km^{2}), of which 37.94 square miles (98.26 km^{2}) is land and 0.90 square miles (2.33 km^{2}) is water. It is drained by the Souadabscook Stream and Penobscot River.

Hampden is crossed by Interstate 95, U.S. Route 1A and U.S. Route 202, as well as Maine State Route 9, State Route 9 Business, and State Route 69. It is bordered by the towns of Winterport to the south, Newburgh to the west, Hermon to the north, Bangor to the northeast, and (separated by the Penobscot River) Brewer to the northeast and Orrington to the east.

=== Climate ===
This climatic region is typified by large seasonal temperature differences, with warm to hot (and often humid) summers and cold (sometimes severely cold) winters. According to the Köppen Climate Classification system, Hampden has a humid continental climate, abbreviated "Dfb" on climate maps.

Climate data for Hampden, Maine
Month	Jan	Feb	Mar	Apr	May	Jun	Jul	Aug	Sep	Oct	Nov	Dec	Year
Mean daily maximum °F (°C)	27 (−3)	30 (−1)	39 (4)	52 (11)	64 (18)	73 (23)	78 (26)	77 (25)	69 (21)	57 (14)	45 (7)	32 (0)	54 (12)
Mean daily minimum °F (°C)	8 (−13)	10 (−12)	21 (−6)	33 (1)	43 (6)	53 (12)	58 (14)	57 (14)	48 (9)	38 (3)	30 (−1)	15 (−9)	35 (2)
Average precipitation inches (mm)	3.1 (79)	2.8 (71)	3.3 (84)	3.4 (86)	3.3 (84)	3.3 (84)	3.4 (86)	3.1 (79)	3.7 (94)	3.9 (99)	4.4 (110)	3.8 (97)	41.6 (1,060)
Source: Weatherbase

== Demographics ==
Historical population
Census	Pop.	Note	%±
1800	904		—
1810	1,279		41.5%
1820	1,443		12.8%
1830	2,020		40.0%
1840	2,663		31.8%
1850	3,195		20.0%
1860	3,085		−3.4%
1870	3,068		−0.6%
1880	2,911		−5.1%
1890	2,484		−14.7%
1900	2,182		−12.2%
1910	2,380		9.1%
1920	2,352		−1.2%
1930	2,417		2.8%
1940	2,591		7.2%
1950	3,608		39.3%
1960	4,583		27.0%
1970	4,693		2.4%
1980	5,250		11.9%
1990	5,974		13.8%
2000	6,327		5.9%
2010	7,257		14.7%
2020	7,709		6.2%
U.S. Decennial Census

=== 2010 census ===
As of the census of 2010, there were 7,257 people, 2,862 households, and 2,053 families living in the town. The population density was 191.3 inhabitants per square mile (73.9/km^{2}). There were 3,030 housing units at an average density of 79.9 per square mile (30.8/km^{2}). The racial makeup of the town was 96.8% White, 0.5% African American, 0.6% Native American, 0.8% Asian, 0.2% from other races, and 1.1% from two or more races. Hispanic or Latino people of any race were 1.1% of the population.

There were 2,862 households, of which 35.4% had children under the age of 18 living with them, 58.4% were married couples living together, 9.6% had a female householder with no husband present, 3.8% had a male householder with no wife present, and 28.3% were non-families. 21.5% of all households were made up of individuals, and 8.2% had someone living alone who was 65 years of age or older. The average household size was 2.53 and the average family size was 2.95.

The median age in the town was 40.8 years. 24.6% of residents were under the age of 18; 6.5% were between the ages of 18 and 24; 25.1% were from 25 to 44; 30.9% were from 45 to 64; and 13% were 65 years of age or older. The gender makeup of the town was 49.6% male and 50.4% female.

=== 2000 census ===
As of the census of 2000, there were 6,327 people, 2,433 households, and 1,802 families living in the town. The population density was 166.1 inhabitants per square mile (64.1/km^{2}). There were 2,545 housing units at an average density of 66.8 per square mile (25.8/km^{2}). The racial makeup of the town was 97.91% White, 0.40% Black or African American, 0.35% Native American, 0.63% Asian, 0.17% from other races, and 0.54% from two or more races. Hispanic or Latino people of any race were 0.51% of the population.

There were 2,433 households, out of which 37.2% had children under the age of 18 living with them, 61.7% were married couples living together, 9.6% had a female householder with no husband present, and 25.9% were non-families. 20.2% of all households were made up of individuals, and 7.9% had someone living alone who was 65 years of age or older. The average household size was 2.60 and the average family size was 3.01.

In the town, the population was spread out, with 27.1% under the age of 18, 6.1% from 18 to 24, 29.2% from 25 to 44, 26.9% from 45 to 64, and 10.7% who were 65 years of age or older. The median age was 39 years. For every 100 females there were 93.7 males. For every 100 females age 18 and over, there were 88.2 males.

The median income for a household in the town was $53,377, and the median income for a family was $61,321. Males had a median income of $45,775 versus $29,183 for females. The per capita income for the town was $26,498. About 3.0% of families and 3.5% of the population were below the poverty line, including 3.3% of those under age 18 and 4.0% of those age 65 or over.

== Site of interest ==
- Hampden Historical Society & Kinsley House Museum
- Colford's Beach
- Hermon Pond
- Lura Hoit Memorial Pool
- Harmony Hall
- Old Hampden Academy Building
- Edythe Dyer Library

== Public safety ==
In 2019, Hampden was ranked the second safest city in Maine based on 2017 data. The ranking is based on zero violent crimes and 7.33 property crimes per 1,000 residents.

== Notable people ==
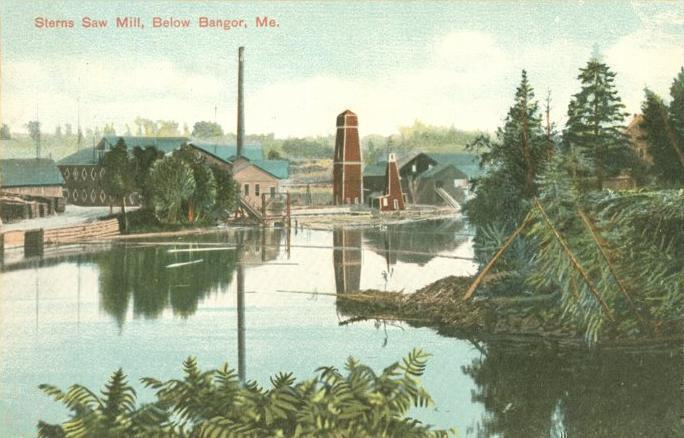
Sterns' sawmill c. 1908

- James Sproat Brown (1824–1878), US congressman for Wisconsin, born in Hampden
- Philip Marshall Brown (1875–1966), US ambassador, born in Hampden
- John Crosby (1828–1887), founder of the Washburn-Crosby Company, the forerunner to General Mills, born in Hampden
- Dorothea Dix (1802–1887), activist, born in Hampden
- Brian Duprey, former member of the Maine House of Representatives for Hampden
- David Haggan, state legislator
- Charles Hamlin (1837–1911), brigadier general in the Civil War; member of the Maine House of Representatives, born in Hampden
- Cyrus Hamlin (1839–1867), Civil War era general, born in Hampden
- Hannibal Hamlin (1809–1891), vice-president of the United States, lived in Hampden
- Carolyn Hopkins, prominent public service announcer, whose voice recorded announcements are heard worldwide; lives in Hampden
- Hiram Knowles (1834–1911), federal judge, born in Hampden
- Ralph W. 'Bud' Leavitt Jr. (1917–1994), Bangor sportswriter, outdoor columnist, and television host; lived in Hampden
- Lewis Mayo (1828–1907), Minnesota state senator, born in Hampden
- Thompson H. Murch (1838–1886), US congressman, born in Hampden
- Charles Stetson (1801–1863), US congressman, grew up in Hampden
- Wilbur N. Taylor (1846–1903), Medal of Honor recipient, born in Hampden
