= Lewis Mayo (politician) =

American politician, physician and businessman

Member of the Minnesota Senate
- In office 1876–1877

Personal details
- Born: August 14, 1828 Hampden, Maine, U.S.
- Died: August 25, 1907 (aged 79) Sauk Rapids, Minnesota, U.S.
- Party: Democratic
- Education: Wesleyan University (attended)

Lewis Mayo (August 14, 1828 – August 25, 1907) was an American politician, attorney, physician, and businessman.

== Early life and education ==
Mayo was born in Hampden, Maine and attended the Hampden Academy. Mayo then attended Wesleyan University from 1850 to 1852.

== Career ==
He was admitted to the Minnesota bar in 1862 and practiced law in Sauk Rapids, Minnesota. Mayo was involved in the real estate business, practiced medicine, and was a druggist in Sauk Rapids. Mayo served as probate judge, school superintendent, district court clerk, coroner, and treasurer for Benton County, Minnesota. Mayo served in the Minnesota Senate in 1876 and 1877 and was a Democrat.

== Death ==
Mayo died in Sauk Rapids, Minnesota.
