= Philip E. Brown =

American judge (1856–1915)

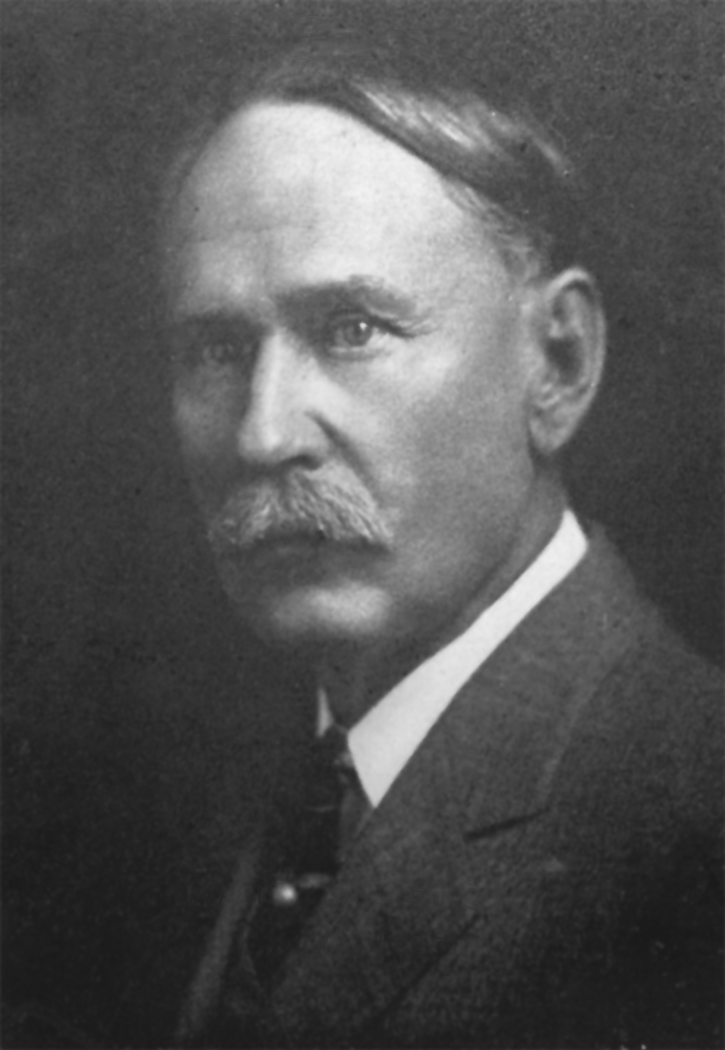
Philip E. Brown

Philip E. Brown (June 19, 1856 – February 8, 1915) was a jurist in the state of Minnesota.

== Biography ==
Brown was born on June 19, 1856, to George O. and Sarah R. Brown in Lafayette County, Wisconsin. On October 8, 1882, he married Ella Ford. He died on February 6, 1915.

== Career ==
Brown was Judge of the 13th District of Minnesota from 1891 to 1910 before serving on the Minnesota State Supreme Court from 1912 to 1915.

Brown died suddenly at the age of 59.
