= Sturgis and Haskell Building =

- U.S. National Register of Historic Places
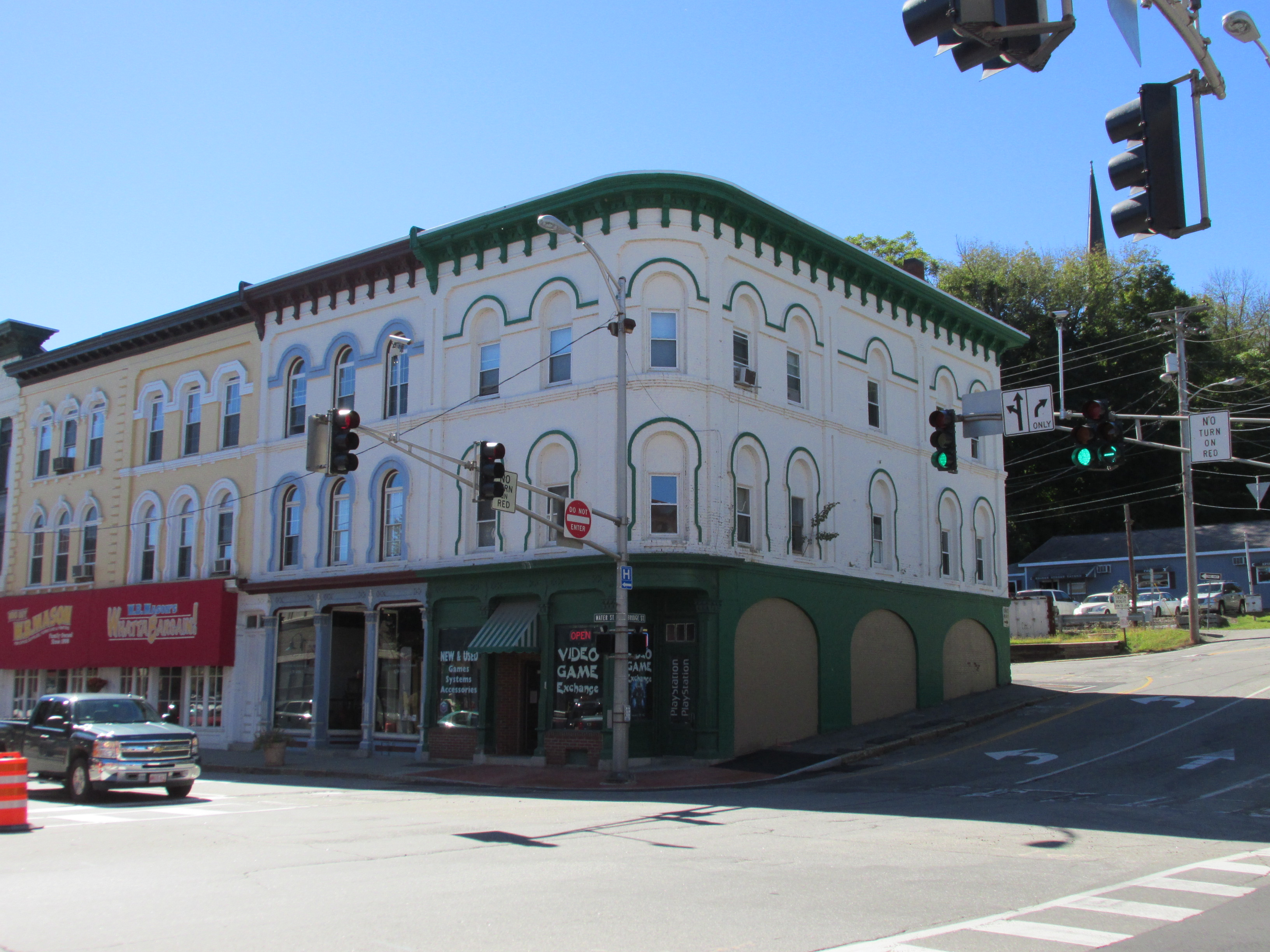

- Location within Maine
- Location: 180-182 Water St., Augusta, Maine
- Coordinates: 44°19′0″N 69°46′27″W
- Area: 0.3 acres (0.12 ha)
- Built: 1867
- Architect: John C. Tibbetts
- Architectural style: Italianate
- MPS: Augusta Central Business District MRA
- NRHP reference No.: 86001697
- Added to NRHP: May 2, 1986

The Sturgis and Haskell Building is a historic commercial building at 180-182 Water Street in downtown Augusta, Maine. Built in 1867, it is one of a series of four Italianate commercial buildings built in the wake of a devastating 1865 fire. It was listed on the National Register of Historic Places in 1986.

== Description and history ==
The Sturgis and Haskell Building stands on the west side of Water Street, Augusta's principal commercial downtown thoroughfare, at its southwest corner with Bridge Street. It is the northernmost of a series of four three-story brick Italianate commercial buildings, running south from that corner, which share a common roof line. The windows of #182 have round-arch headers, with a band of brick corbelling joining the arches. A second brick corbel stringcourse separates the second and third floors. The windows of #180 were originally like those of #182, but have been replaced by rectangular sash, and the rounded headers have been filled in. The building has two storefronts facing Water Street, while the Bridge Street facade has blinded round arches.

All four of these buildings were built beginning in 1865, after a fire devastated Augusta's downtown. This building was designed by John C. Tibbetts, Augusta's preeminent architect of the time, and was built for Ira Sturgis and Erastus Haskell. It is the last of the building series to be completed. The building continues to see commercial use.

== See also ==
- Noble Block, #186 Water Street
- National Register of Historic Places listings in Kennebec County, Maine
