= Libby Hill =

Libby Hill may refer to:

- Libby Hill, Maine, a small town in Maine, U.S.A.
- Libby Hill, Richmond, a neighborhood in Richmond, Virginia, U.S.A.
- The Libby-Hill Block a building in Augusta, Maine
- Miss Earth USA 2019, Libby Hill
