= National Register of Historic Places listings in Kennebec County, Maine =

Location of Kennebec County in Maine

This is a list of the National Register of Historic Places listings in Kennebec County, Maine.

This is intended to be a complete list of the properties and districts on the National Register of Historic Places in Kennebec County, Maine, United States. Latitude and longitude coordinates are provided for many National Register properties and districts; these locations may be seen together in a map.

There are 134 properties and districts listed on the National Register in the county, including 7 National Historic Landmarks. Six sites were once listed on the register but have since been removed.

This National Park Service list is complete through NPS recent listings posted May 1, 2026.

Contents: Counties and municipalities in Maine
Androscoggin - Aroostook - Cumberland (City of Portland) - Franklin - Hancock - Kennebec - Knox - Lincoln - Oxford - Penobscot - Piscataquis - Sagadahoc - Somerset - Waldo - Washington - York

== Current listings ==
	Name on the Register	Image	Date listed	Location	City or town	Description
1	D.V. Adams Co.-Bussell and Weston	D.V. Adams Co.-Bussell and Weston	May 2, 1986 (#86001690)	190 Water St. 44°18′59″N 69°46′28″W	Augusta	
2	Alls Souls Church	Alls Souls Church	January 31, 1978 (#78000178)	70 State St. 44°18′59″N 69°46′38″W	Augusta	
3	Androscoggin Yacht Club	Androscoggin Yacht Club	October 31, 2012 (#12000893)	22 Lake St. 44°20′52″N 70°04′08″W	Wayne	
4	Arnold Trail to Quebec	Arnold Trail to Quebec	October 1, 1969 (#69000018)	Along the Kennebec River, through Wayman and Flagstaff lakes along the Dead River and Chain of Ponds to Quebec, Canada; 44°40′49″N 69°59′18″W	Augusta	Extends through Franklin, Kennebec, Sagadahoc, and Somerset counties
5	Former Augusta City Hall	Former Augusta City Hall	September 26, 1997 (#97001134)	1 Cony St. 44°19′01″N 69°46′18″W	Augusta	
6	Charles M. Bailey Public Library	Charles M. Bailey Public Library	June 20, 1985 (#85001264)	Bowdoin St. 44°18′29″N 69°58′24″W	Winthrop	
7	Moses Bailey House	Moses Bailey House	November 8, 1984 (#84000325)	State Route 135; 44°18′20″N 69°55′24″W	Winthrop Center	
8	Algernon Bangs House	Algernon Bangs House	February 19, 1982 (#82000751)	16 E. Chestnut St. 44°18′47″N 69°46′02″W	Augusta	
9	Benton Grange No. 458	Benton Grange No. 458	April 28, 2004 (#04000373)	Junction of River Rd. and School Dr. 44°35′21″N 69°35′06″W	Benton	
10	The Birches	The Birches	September 27, 1996 (#96001036)	Off the eastern side of Foster Ln., 0.15 miles south of its junction with State Route 27; 44°31′22″N 69°53′14″W	Belgrade Lakes	
11	James G. Blaine House	James G. Blaine House	October 15, 1966 (#66000024)	Capitol and State Sts. 44°18′28″N 69°46′53″W	Augusta	
12	Blossom House	Blossom House	April 7, 1989 (#89000250)	Main St. 44°14′16″N 70°02′12″W	Monmouth	
13	Bond Street Historic District	Bond Street Historic District	April 11, 2014 (#14000137)	8, 9, 12, 18, 21, 22 & 25 Bond St., 44°19′14″N 69°46′27″W	Augusta	
14	Brick School	Brick School	April 18, 1977 (#77000068)	South of Winslow on Cushman Rd. 44°30′38″N 69°37′51″W	Winslow	
15	Brown Memorial Library	Brown Memorial Library	April 28, 1975 (#75000099)	53 Railroad St. 44°38′20″N 69°30′12″W	Clinton	John Calvin Stevens, architect (1903).
16	Brunswick Square	Brunswick Square	June 28, 2021 (#100006675)	Bounded by School St., Brunswick, Dresden, and Lincoln Aves. 44°13′37″N 69°46′31″W	Gardiner	
17	Capitol Complex Historic District	Capitol Complex Historic District	December 31, 2001 (#01001417)	State and Capitol Sts. 44°18′24″N 69°46′49″W	Augusta	
18	Capitol Park	Capitol Park	April 7, 1989 (#89000252)	Roughly bounded by Capitol St., the Kennebec River, Union St., and State St. 44°18′23″N 69°46′43″W	Augusta	
19	Chandler Store	Chandler Store	June 20, 1985 (#85001263)	State Route 27; 44°31′41″N 69°53′19″W	Belgrade	
20	China Village Historic District	China Village Historic District	November 23, 1977 (#77000069)	State Route 9; 44°28′41″N 69°31′10″W	China	
21	Christ Episcopal Church	Christ Episcopal Church	July 24, 1973 (#73000129)	1 Dresden Ave. 44°13′39″N 69°46′32″W	Gardiner	
22	Edmund and Rachel Clark Homestead	Edmund and Rachel Clark Homestead	October 4, 2006 (#06000921)	Address Restricted	China	
23	Cobbossee Lighthouse	Cobbossee Lighthouse	January 12, 1984 (#84001369)	Ladies Delight Island; 44°18′28″N 69°53′34″W	Winthrop	Ladies Delight Light
24	Cobbosseecontee Dam Site		June 3, 1976 (#76000219)	Address Restricted	Manchester	
25	Colburn House State Historic Site	Colburn House State Historic Site	July 28, 2004 (#04000741)	Arnold Rd., Old State Route 27 (0.1 miles south of its junction with State Route 27); 44°11′52″N 69°45′16″W	Pittston	
26	Colburn School	Colburn School	January 11, 2001 (#00001633)	Arnold Rd., 0.4 miles south of its junction with State Route 27; 44°11′49″N 69°45′04″W	Pittston	
27	Colcord Farmstead	Colcord Farmstead	December 29, 2005 (#05001468)	184 Unity Rd. 44°35′48″N 69°32′22″W	Benton	
28	Colonial Theater	Colonial Theater	October 8, 2014 (#14000834)	139 Water St. 44°19′04″N 69°46′24″W	Augusta	
29	Cony High School	Cony High School	September 29, 1988 (#88001841)	Cony Circle at Cony and Stone Sts. 44°18′58″N 69°46′03″W	Augusta	
30	Gov. Samuel Cony House	Gov. Samuel Cony House	April 11, 1985 (#85000732)	71 Stone St. 44°18′43″N 69°45′50″W	Augusta	
31	Crosby Street Historic District	Crosby Street Historic District	September 11, 1986 (#86002438)	Crosby St. and Crosby Ln. 44°19′05″N 69°46′32″W	Augusta	
32	Cumston Hall	Cumston Hall	August 14, 1973 (#73000130)	Main St. 44°14′28″N 70°02′04″W	Monmouth	Harry Hayman Cochrane, architect (1899-1900).
33	Cushnoc (ME 021.02)	Cushnoc (ME 021.02)	October 27, 1989 (#89001703)	Near Fort Western; 44°18′55″N 69°46′16″W	Augusta	Site of a 17th-century Plymouth Colony trading post
34	John Davis House	John Davis House	July 14, 1983 (#83000454)	State Route 9; 44°16′31″N 69°46′21″W	Chelsea	
35	Doughty Block	Doughty Block	May 2, 1986 (#86001691)	265 Water St. 44°18′55″N 69°46′28″W	Augusta	
36	Dutton-Small House	Dutton-Small House	December 18, 1990 (#90001907)	Bog Rd. west of Taber Hill Rd. 44°26′22″N 69°39′15″W	Vassalboro	
37	East Vassalboro Grist and Saw Mill	East Vassalboro Grist and Saw Mill	January 28, 1982 (#82000752)	State Route 32; 44°27′07″N 69°36′24″W	East Vassalboro	
38	Dr. J.W. Ellis House	Dr. J.W. Ellis House	August 15, 1979 (#79000148)	62 State St. 44°19′02″N 69°46′38″W	Augusta	
39	Elm Hill Farm	Elm Hill Farm	August 25, 1970 (#70000045)	Litchfield Rd. 44°16′48″N 69°47′57″W	Hallowell	
40	First Baptist Church	First Baptist Church	November 7, 1976 (#76000095)	Park and Elm Sts. 44°33′06″N 69°37′59″W	Waterville	
41	Fort Halifax	Fort Halifax	November 24, 1968 (#68000015)	On U.S. Route 201 at Winslow; 44°32′05″N 69°37′47″W	Winslow	
42	Fort Western	Fort Western	December 2, 1969 (#69000009)	Bowman St. 44°18′59″N 69°46′16″W	Augusta	
43	Foster Farm Barn	Foster Farm Barn	November 9, 2015 (#15000768)	538 Augusta Rd. 44°29′28″N 69°51′21″W	Belgrade	
44	Foster-Redington House	Foster-Redington House	April 11, 2014 (#14000138)	8 Park Place; 44°33′08″N 69°38′01″W	Waterville	
45	Fuller-Weston House	Fuller-Weston House	March 22, 1984 (#84001374)	11 Summer St. 44°18′59″N 69°46′45″W	Augusta	
46	Guy P. Gannett House	Guy P. Gannett House	April 28, 1983 (#83000455)	184 State St. 44°18′32″N 69°46′52″W	Augusta	
47	Gardiner Historic District	Gardiner Historic District	May 6, 1980 (#80000233)	Water St. 44°13′45″N 69°46′15″W	Gardiner	
48	Gardiner Railroad Station	Gardiner Railroad Station	October 29, 1982 (#82000423)	51 Maine Ave. 44°13′51″N 69°46′18″W	Gardiner	
49	Governor's House	Governor's House	February 23, 1974 (#74000319)	Off State Route 17; 44°16′48″N 69°42′08″W	Togus	
50	Peter Grant House	Peter Grant House	May 17, 1976 (#76000096)	10 Grant St. 44°14′29″N 69°46′27″W	Farmingdale	
51	William F. Grant House	William F. Grant House	May 17, 2006 (#06000396)	869 Main St. 44°28′57″N 69°37′20″W	North Vassalboro	
52	Hallowell Historic District	Hallowell Historic District	October 28, 1970 (#100001675)	The hillside of Hallowell; 44°17′05″N 69°47′40″W	Hallowell	
53	Hartford Fire Station	Hartford Fire Station	January 2, 2018 (#100001927)	1 Hartford Sq. 44°18′43″N 69°46′32″W	Augusta	
54	Heald House	Heald House	February 15, 2005 (#05000058)	19 West St. 44°33′13″N 69°38′14″W	Waterville	
55	Gov. John F. Hill Mansion	Gov. John F. Hill Mansion	November 21, 1977 (#77000070)	136 State St. 44°18′45″N 69°46′44″W	Augusta	
56	Ella R. Hodgkins Intermediate School	Ella R. Hodgkins Intermediate School	July 14, 2015 (#15000417)	17 Malta St. 44°18′58″N 69°45′26″W	Augusta	
57	Hussey-Littlefield Farm	Hussey-Littlefield Farm	January 12, 2016 (#15000969)	63 Hussey Rd. 44°31′45″N 69°26′01″W	Albion	
58	Abel Jones House	Abel Jones House	August 4, 1983 (#83000456)	Off U.S. Route 202; 44°23′53″N 69°34′13″W	China	
59	Eli and Sybil Jones House	Eli and Sybil Jones House	March 22, 1984 (#84001376)	Dirigo Corner; 44°24′33″N 69°31′17″W	South China	
60	Journal Building	Journal Building	May 2, 1986 (#86001692)	325-331 Water St. 44°18′50″N 69°46′30″W	Augusta	
61	Kennebec Arsenal	Kennebec Arsenal	August 25, 1970 (#70000046)	Arsenal St. 44°18′29″N 69°46′10″W	Augusta	
62	Kennebec County Courthouse	Kennebec County Courthouse	July 25, 1974 (#74000169)	95 State St. 44°18′53″N 69°46′39″W	Augusta	
63	Kent Burying Ground	Kent Burying Ground	December 31, 2008 (#08001254)	Northeastern corner of Fayette Corner Rd. and Oak Hill Rd. 44°25′12″N 70°04′17″W	Fayette	
64	Kent's Hill School Historic District	Kent's Hill School Historic District	April 26, 1979 (#79000149)	State Route 17; 44°24′06″N 70°00′09″W	Kent's Hill	
65	Kresge Building	Kresge Building	May 2, 1986 (#86001693)	241-249 Water St. 44°18′57″N 69°46′28″W	Augusta	
66	Philip Leach House	Philip Leach House	October 20, 1983 (#83003644)	Hussey Hill Rd. 44°26′54″N 69°36′33″W	Vassalboro	
67	Jesse Lee Church	Jesse Lee Church	July 19, 1984 (#84001378)	State Route 17 and Plains Rd. 44°21′44″N 69°54′44″W	Readfield	
68	Libby-Hill Block	Libby-Hill Block	May 2, 1986 (#86001694)	227-233 Water St. 44°18′58″N 69°46′27″W	Augusta	
69	The Lion (locomotive)	The Lion (locomotive)	December 15, 1976 (#76000118)	Maine State Museum; 44°18′22″N 69°46′57″W	Augusta	Listed at the University of Maine at Machias.
70	Lithgow Library	Lithgow Library	July 24, 1974 (#74000170)	Winthrop St. 44°18′56″N 69°46′41″W	Augusta	
71	Lockwood Mill Historic District	Lockwood Mill Historic District	May 8, 2007 (#07000412)	6, 6B, 8, 10, and 10B Water St. 44°32′46″N 69°37′47″W	Waterville	
72	Alvin O. Lombard House	Alvin O. Lombard House	February 19, 1982 (#82000753)	65 Elm St. 44°33′00″N 69°37′59″W	Waterville	
73	Jon Lund Site		November 21, 1980 (#80000234)	Address Restricted	Manchester	
74	Maine Archeological Survey Site 53.36		December 27, 1990 (#90001901)	Address Restricted	Winslow	
75	Maine Industrial School for Girls Historic District	Maine Industrial School for Girls Historic District	April 22, 2003 (#03000289)	Winthrop St., 0.5 miles west of its junction with Water St. 44°17′30″N 69°47′51″W	Hallowell	
76	Maine Insane Hospital	Maine Insane Hospital	July 19, 1982 (#82000754)	Hospital St. • Boundary increase (listed August 2, 2001: Bounded by Hospital St. and Hospital Ave. 44°18′06″N 69°46′12″W	Augusta	
77	Maine State House	Maine State House	April 24, 1973 (#73000266)	Capitol St. 44°18′25″N 69°46′56″W	Augusta	
78	Masonic Hall	Masonic Hall	May 2, 1986 (#86001695)	313-321 Water St. 44°18′51″N 69°46′30″W	Augusta	
79	Memorial Hall	Memorial Hall	November 23, 1977 (#77000071)	Church St. 44°32′45″N 69°43′12″W	Oakland	
80	Mill Agent's House	Mill Agent's House	October 6, 1983 (#83003645)	State Route 32; 44°29′10″N 69°37′21″W	North Vassalboro	
81	Moody Mansion	Moody Mansion	May 17, 2006 (#06000394)	State Route 194, across from the junction with Hanley Rd. 44°10′32″N 69°40′24″W	Pittston	
82	Lot Morrill House	Lot Morrill House	July 18, 1974 (#74000171)	113 Winthrop St. 44°19′01″N 69°47′01″W	Augusta	
83	Mt. Merici Historic District	Mt. Merici Historic District	March 28, 2019 (#100003588)	152 Western Ave. & 99 St. Angela Way; 44°33′17″N 69°39′21″W	Waterville	
84	Noble Block	Noble Block	May 2, 1986 (#86001696)	186 Water St. 44°19′00″N 69°46′27″W	Augusta	
85	North Monmouth Library	North Monmouth Library	March 27, 2017 (#100000807)	132 N. Main St. 44°16′33″N 70°01′40″W	Monmouth	
86	Oakland Public Library	Oakland Public Library	April 14, 2000 (#00000375)	18 Church St. 44°32′47″N 69°43′11″W	Oakland	
87	Oaklands	Oaklands	July 27, 1973 (#73000131)	Southern end of Dresden St. 44°12′48″N 69°45′58″W	Gardiner	
88	Old Post Office	Old Post Office	July 18, 1974 (#74000172)	295 Water St. 44°18′52″N 69°46′27″W	Augusta	
89	Pendle Hill	Pendle Hill	August 4, 1983 (#83000457)	Off U.S. Route 202; 44°24′37″N 69°33′48″W	China	
90	Pittston Congregational Church	Pittston Congregational Church	January 31, 1978 (#78000179)	Junction of State Routes 27 and 194; 44°13′02″N 69°45′19″W	Pittston	
91	Pond Meeting House	Pond Meeting House	August 4, 1983 (#83000458)	On U.S. Route 202; 44°26′12″N 69°31′41″W	China	On the grounds of the Friends Camp
92	Powder House Lot	Powder House Lot	April 11, 2002 (#02000348)	High St., ¼ mile south of its junction with Winthrop St. 44°17′19″N 69°48′00″W	Hallowell	
93	Powers House	Powers House	October 1, 1979 (#79000150)	South of Sidney on State Route 104; 44°23′23″N 69°44′07″W	Sidney	
94	Pressey House	Pressey House	September 15, 1977 (#77000072)	32 Belgrade Rd. 44°32′28″N 69°43′28″W	Oakland	
95	Professional Building	Professional Building	February 19, 1982 (#82000755)	177 and 179 Main St. 44°33′07″N 69°37′52″W	Waterville	
96	Dr. Samuel Quimby House	Dr. Samuel Quimby House	December 18, 1990 (#90001903)	North Rd. east of its junction with Church Rd. 44°25′49″N 69°56′19″W	Mount Vernon	
97	Readfield Union Meeting House	Readfield Union Meeting House	July 8, 1982 (#82000756)	Church Rd. 44°23′22″N 69°58′01″W	Readfield	
98	Redington House	Redington House	July 21, 1978 (#78000180)	64 Silver St. 44°32′49″N 69°38′05″W	Waterville	Historical society museum
99	G.W. Reed Travellers Home	G.W. Reed Travellers Home	February 11, 1982 (#82000757)	Address Restricted	Benton	
100	River Meetinghouse	River Meetinghouse	September 19, 1977 (#77000073)	U.S. Route 201 and Oak Grove Rd. 44°28′02″N 69°40′30″W	Vassalboro	
101	Riverview House	Riverview House	April 12, 2001 (#01000369)	U.S. Route 201 0.15 miles southeast of its junction with Old Federal Rd. 44°22′54″N 69°43′07″W	Vassalboro	
102	Edwin Arlington Robinson House	Edwin Arlington Robinson House	November 11, 1971 (#71000070)	67 Lincoln Ave. 44°13′20″N 69°46′25″W	Gardiner	
103	Row House	Row House	July 1, 1970 (#70000047)	106-114 2nd St. 44°17′14″N 69°47′29″W	Hallowell	
104	Elizabeth Ann Seton Hospital	Elizabeth Ann Seton Hospital	July 11, 2016 (#16000437)	30 Chase Ave. 44°32′57″N 69°39′31″W	Waterville	
105	South China Meeting House	South China Meeting House	August 4, 1983 (#83000459)	S. China Village; 44°23′45″N 69°34′27″W	South China	
106	South Parish Congregational Church and Parish House	South Parish Congregational Church and Parish House	June 22, 1980 (#80000235)	Church St. 44°19′02″N 69°46′33″W	Augusta	
107	Spruce Point Camps	Spruce Point Camps	February 7, 2007 (#07000011)	84 Bearnstow Rd. 44°29′56″N 70°00′51″W	Mount Vernon	Now known as Bearnstow.
108	St. Mark's Episcopal Church	St. Mark's Episcopal Church	July 19, 1984 (#84001379)	9 Summer St. 44°18′59″N 69°46′43″W	Augusta	
109	St. Mary's Church	St. Mary's Church	June 12, 1987 (#87000943)	39 Western Ave. 44°18′42″N 69°47′03″W	Augusta	
110	Starling Grange #156 (former)	Starling Grange #156 (former)	April 5, 2016 (#16000136)	2769 Main St. (ME 17); 44°26′58″N 70°04′07″W	Fayette	
111	Capt. Nathaniel Stone House	Capt. Nathaniel Stone House	April 22, 2003 (#03000292)	268 Maine Ave. 44°14′21″N 69°46′19″W	Farmingdale	
112	Sturgis and Haskell Building	Sturgis and Haskell Building	May 2, 1986 (#86001697)	180-182 Water St. 44°19′00″N 69°46′27″W	Augusta	
113	Tappan-Viles House	Tappan-Viles House	February 11, 1982 (#82000759)	150 State St. 44°18′40″N 69°46′48″W	Augusta	
114	Tiffany Chapel	Tiffany Chapel	October 4, 2018 (#100003010)	544 Tiffany Rd. 44°29′12″N 69°45′04″W	Sidney	
115	Togus VA Medical Center and National Cemetery	Togus VA Medical Center and National Cemetery	October 3, 2012 (#12000826)	1 VA Center; 44°16′43″N 69°42′15″W	Togus	
116	Two Cent Bridge	Two Cent Bridge	September 20, 1973 (#73000132)	Spans the Kennebec River at Temple St. 44°33′03″N 69°37′45″W	Waterville and Winslow	
117	Joseph H. Underwood House	Joseph H. Underwood House	December 28, 2005 (#05001470)	1957 Main St. 44°24′33″N 70°02′02″W	Fayette	
118	Universalist-Unitarian Church	Universalist-Unitarian Church	February 17, 1978 (#78000181)	Silver and Elm Sts. 44°32′48″N 69°38′09″W	Waterville	
119	Vassalboro Mill	Vassalboro Mill	October 5, 2020 (#100005649)	934 and 960 Main St. 44°29′12″N 69°37′23″W	Vassalboro	
120	Vaughan Homestead	Vaughan Homestead	October 6, 1970 (#70000091)	Middle St. off Litchfield Rd. 44°16′36″N 69°47′43″W	Hallowell	
121	Vickery Building	Vickery Building	March 22, 1984 (#84001380)	261 Water St. 44°18′46″N 69°46′28″W	Augusta	
122	Vienna Town House	Vienna Town House	October 29, 1982 (#82000424)	State Route 41; 44°32′21″N 69°59′57″W	Vienna	
123	Water Street	Water Street	January 17, 2017 (#100000524)	71-286 Water & 1 Winthrop Sts. 44°18′56″N 69°46′26″W	Augusta	
124	Waterville High School	Waterville High School	September 30, 2010 (#10000807)	21 Gilman St. 44°33′13″N 69°38′14″W	Waterville	aka the Gilman Street School, now apartments.
125	Waterville Main Street Historic District	Waterville Main Street Historic District	December 19, 2012 (#12001066)	Roughly Main & Common Sts.; also 129-179 Main & 13 Appleton Sts. 44°32′58″N 69°37′47″W	Waterville	Second set of addresses represent a boundary increase September 27, 2016
126	Waterville Opera House and City Hall	Waterville Opera House and City Hall	January 1, 1976 (#76000097)	Castonguay Sq. 44°32′59″N 69°37′47″W	Waterville	
127	Waterville Post Office	Waterville Post Office	April 18, 1977 (#77000074)	Main and Elm St. 44°33′08″N 69°37′54″W	Waterville	
128	Wayne Town House	Wayne Town House	January 1, 1976 (#76000098)	State Route 133; 44°21′10″N 70°04′25″W	Wayne	
129	Whitehouse Block	Whitehouse Block	May 2, 1986 (#86001698)	188 Water St. 44°19′00″N 69°46′27″W	Augusta	
130	Williams Block	Williams Block	May 2, 1986 (#86001699)	183-187 Water St. 44°19′00″N 69°46′28″W	Augusta	
131	John Williams House	John Williams House	December 6, 1984 (#84000531)	Church St. 44°30′07″N 69°59′19″W	Mount Vernon	
132	Wing Family Cemetery	Wing Family Cemetery	October 16, 1991 (#91001514)	Eastern side of Pond Rd. north of its junction with State Route 133; 44°22′14″N 70°04′01″W	Wayne	
133	Winthrop Mills Company	Winthrop Mills Company	October 8, 2014 (#14000835)	149-151 Main Street; 44°18′26″N 69°58′17″W	Winthrop	
134	Winthrop Street Historic District	Winthrop Street Historic District	August 6, 2001 (#01000815)	Roughly bounded by State, Bridge, North and South Chestnut, and Green Sts. • Boundary increase (listed December 30, 2008, refnum 08001255): 20 Spring St. 44°18′54″N 69°46′52″W	Augusta	

== Former listings ==
	Name on the Register	Image	Date listed	Date removed	Location	City or town	Description
1	Klir Beck House		November 23, 1977 (#100001239)	June 30, 2017	West of Mt. Vernon off State Route 41; 44°30′26″N 70°00′05″W	Vienna	Listed as being in the Mt. Vernon vicinity; destroyed by fire on January 27, 2000.
2	Christian Science Church		June 13, 1986 (#86001271)	August 5, 1987	17 Lincoln Ave.	Gardiner	Delisted due to extensive alterations.
3	Dinsmore Grain Company Mill	Dinsmore Grain Company Mill	November 3, 1979 (#79000147)	March 21, 2023	West of Palermo on State Route 3; 44°24′32″N 69°28′28″W	China	Main building apparently demolished.
4	Laura Richards House	Laura Richards House	June 14, 1979 (#79000151)	August 29, 2024	3 Dennis St. 44°13′38″N 69°46′21″W	Gardiner	Damaged by fire and subsequently demolished.
5	Shrewsbury Round Barn		February 19, 1982 (#82000758)	January 15, 2004	109 Benton Avenue	Winslow	Was the only round barn in the state of Maine. Was destroyed by fire on May 22, 1991.
6	Jonas R. Shurtleff House		December 30, 1974 (#74000173)	March 21, 2023	Augusta Rd. 44°31′36″N 69°38′34″W	Winslow	Apparently demolished.

== See also ==
- List of National Historic Landmarks in Maine
- National Register of Historic Places listings in Maine
