= Crosby Street Historic District =

Historic district in Maine, United States

- U.S. National Register of Historic Places
- U.S. Historic district
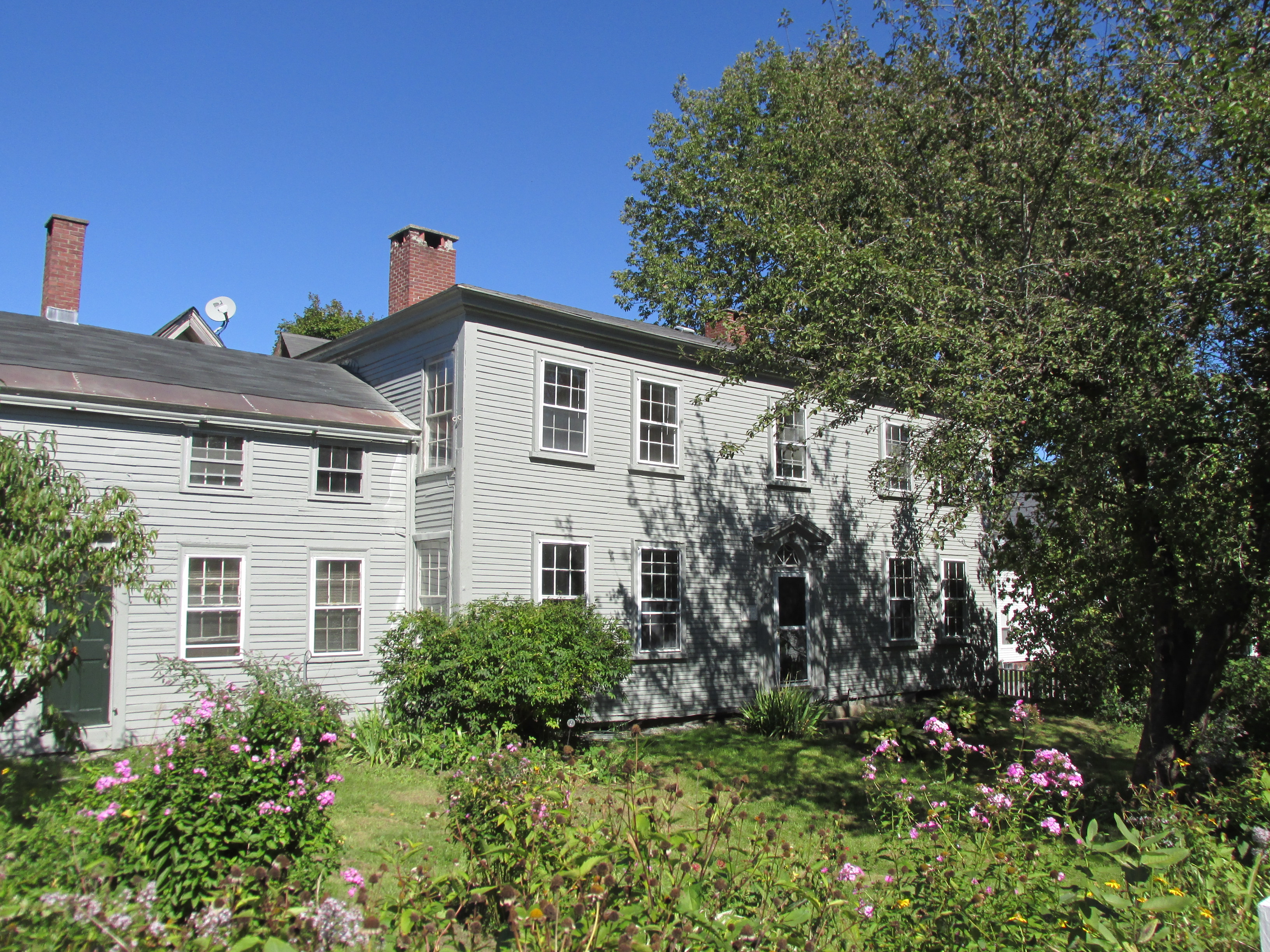
- The George Crosby House, Crosby Lane

- Location within Maine Location within the United States
- Location: Crosby St. and Crosby Ln., Augusta, Maine
- Coordinates: 44°19′05″N 69°46′32″W
- Area: 2 acres (0.81 ha)
- Architectural style: Greek Revival, Federal
- NRHP reference No.: 86002438
- Added to NRHP: September 11, 1986

The Crosby Street Historic District encompasses a collection of well-preserved high-quality early 19th-century houses on Crosby Street and Crosby Lane in Augusta, Maine. Located on a rise overlooking the city's downtown, these houses were built by leading businessmen of the period, and are either Federal or Greek Revival in their style. The district was listed on the National Register of Historic Places in 1986.

== Description and history ==
Crosby Street and Crosby Lane are located on a hill just north of Augusta's downtown business district. The two streets form a L, its ends at Bridge Street, a major east–west route, and State Street, a major north–south route. There are eight houses in the district, of which seven are historically significant. One faces State Street, one Crosby Lane, and the others face Crosby Street. The oldest house is that of George Crosby, a two-story wood-frame building with Federal style. Two houses, built in the 1840s, exhibit Greek Revival style, while one is transitional between the Greek Revival and Federal periods.

This enclave of homes is a surviving element of Augusta's early commercial development. In that period, businessmen built their houses near the commercial district. As later commercial and industrial development encroached, wealthier elements of the community built further away. This area survived conversion to commercial or industrial use because of its location on a hill. Many of these houses have been converted into multiple units.

== See also ==
- National Register of Historic Places listings in Kennebec County, Maine
