= Hussey–Littlefield Farm =

- U.S. National Register of Historic Places
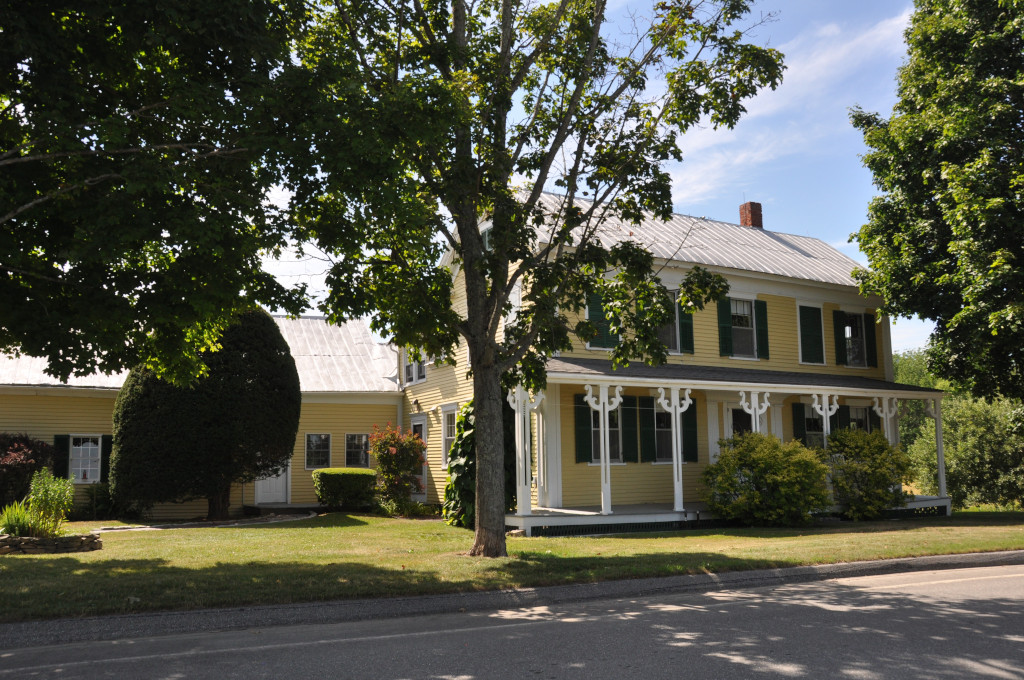

- Location within Maine Location within the United States
- Location: 63 Hussey Rd., Albion, Maine
- Coordinates: 44°31′45″N 69°26′1″W
- Area: 6.8 acres (2.8 ha)
- Built: 1838
- NRHP reference No.: 15000969
- Added to NRHP: January 12, 2016

The Hussey–Littlefield Farm is a historic farmstead at 63 Hussey Road in Albion, Maine. Developed between about 1838 and 1905, the farm's connected homestead exhibits the evolutionary changes of rural agricultural architecture in 19th-century Maine. The farmstead was listed on the National Register of Historic Places in 2016.

== Description and history ==
The Hussey–Littlefield farmstead stands on the west side of Hussey Road, in central Albion southeast of the village center. The farmstead consists of a connected series of wood-frame structures, with the main house at the northern end and a barn at the southern. The house is a 2-1/2 story structure, with a side gable roof, and a porch extending across its front. It has modest Italianate styling, with corner pilasters and decorative trident-shaped posts supporting the porch. A small ell extends to the rear of the house, with a second ell extending to its left (south). That ell is connected to a wagon shed, which connects the structure to the main barn.

The farm property was settled in 1838 by Silas Hussey, and it is believed that he soon thereafter built the house and the barn, as separate structures. The rear ell is an integral part of this construction. Sometime between 1859 and 1873, the south ell and wagon shed were added by his son Bert. The farm was sold by Bert's grandchildren to the Littlefields, who were in the second generation of ownership when the property was listed on the National Register in 2016.

== See also ==
- National Register of Historic Places listings in Kennebec County, Maine
