= Vienna Town House =

- U.S. National Register of Historic Places
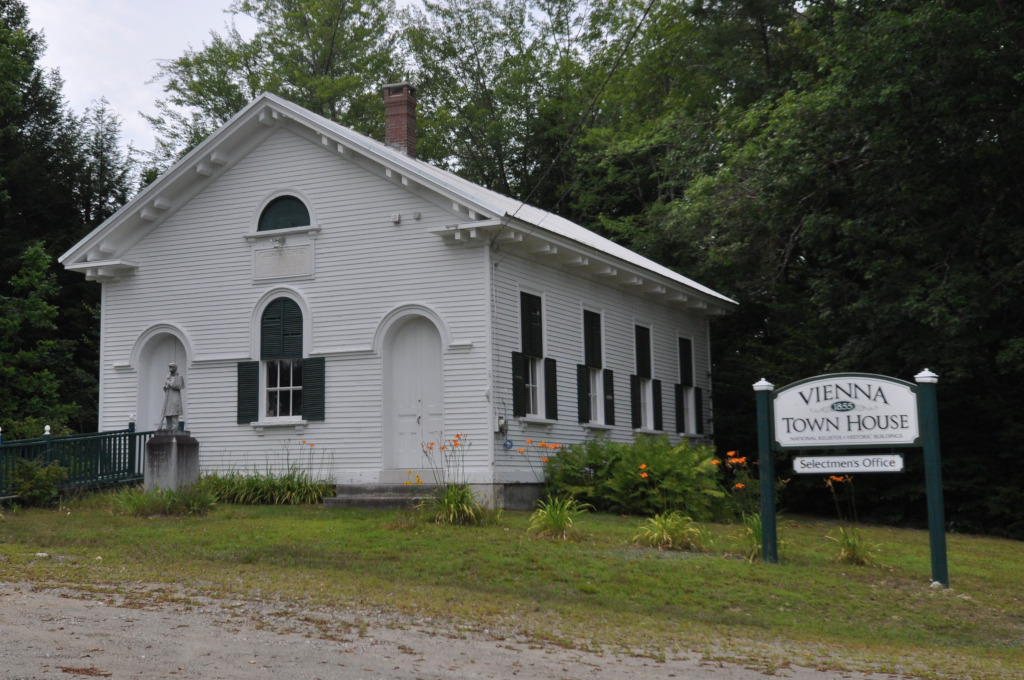

- Location within Maine Location within the United States
- Location: ME 41, Vienna, Maine
- Coordinates: 44°32′24″N 70°00′01″W
- Area: 0.5 acres (0.20 ha)
- Built: 1854
- Architectural style: Greek Revival, Italianate
- NRHP reference No.: 82000424
- Added to NRHP: October 29, 1982

The Vienna Town House is a historic government building on Maine State Route 41 in Vienna, Maine. Built in 1854–55, it is a well-preserved local example of transitional Greek Revival-Italianate architecture. It was listed on the National Register of Historic Places in 1982. It continues to be used for municipal functions.

== Description and history ==
The Vienna Town House is located northwest of the village center of Vienna, on the south side of Town House Road (SR 41) east of its junction with Mineral Springs Road. It is a single-story wood-frame structure, with a gabled roof, clapboarded exterior, and granite foundation. The gable and eaves have paired brackets, and the main facade is symmetrical, with two entrances flanking a sash window, all set in round-arch openings. A half-round louver is set in the gable, above the entrance's and a marble panel honoring the building's donor. Windows along the sides are six-over-six sash, set in rectangular openings.

The town house was built in 1854–55, and was a gift of Vienna native Joseph Whittier. Its architect is unknown; it may have been a Boston architect, as that is where Whittier was based at the time of his donation. The building exhibits more architectural sophistication than many similar town houses in Maine's smaller communities.

== See also ==
- National Register of Historic Places listings in Kennebec County, Maine
