= Brown Memorial Library =

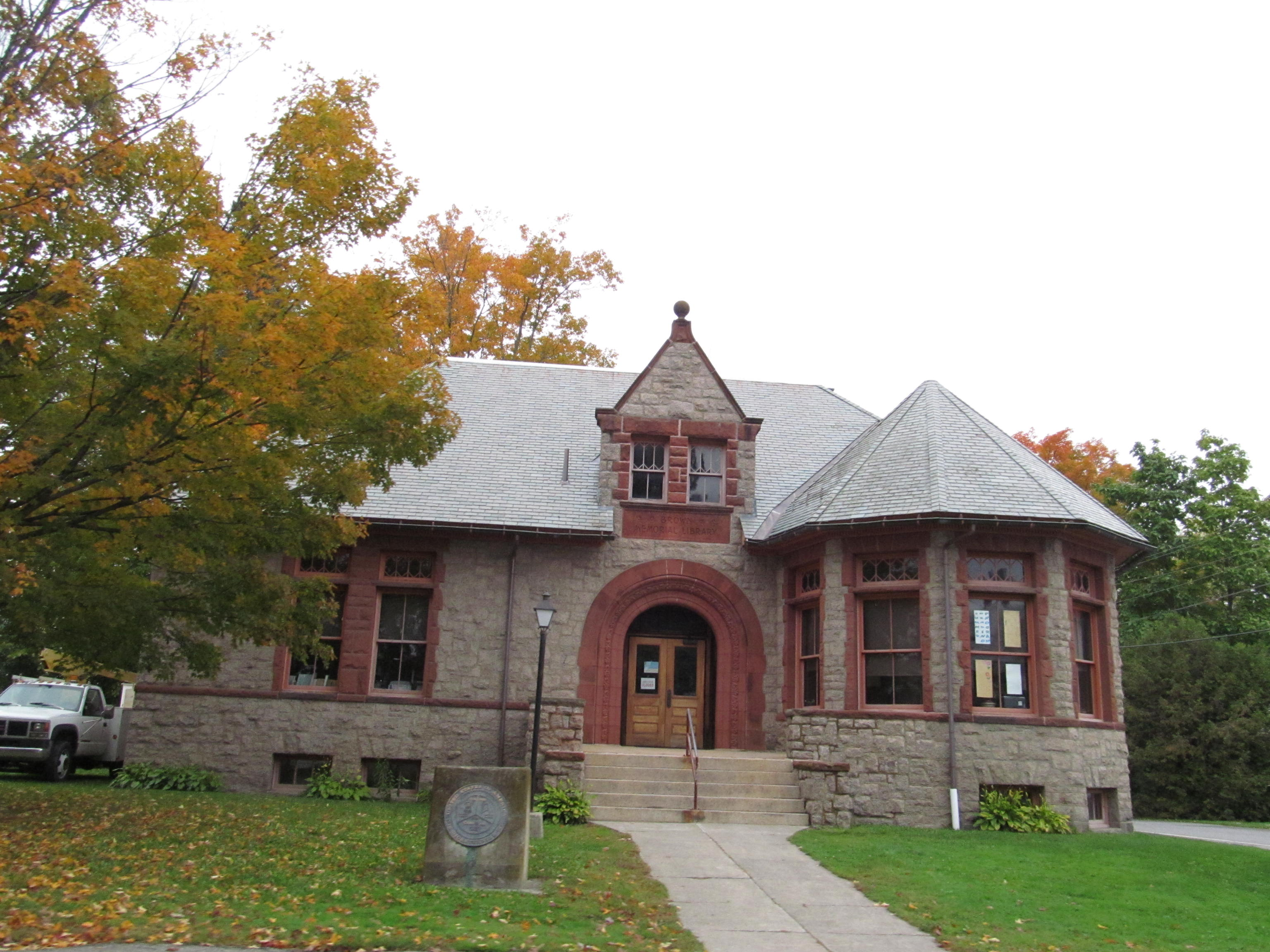
- Location: Clinton, Maine, United States
- Type: Public
- Established: 1900
- Architect: John Calvin Stevens

Collection
- Size: 10,835

Access and use
- Circulation: 2,683
- Population served: 3,340

Other information
- Budget: $51,156
- Director: Cheryl Dickey-Whitish
- Employees: 2
- Website: Official website
- Brown Memorial Library
- U.S. National Register of Historic Places
- Location within Maine Location within the United States
- Coordinates: 44°38′19.7″N 69°30′11.5″W
- Area: 1 acre (0.40 ha)
- Built: 1899
- Architect: John Calvin Stevens
- Architectural style: Romanesque
- NRHP reference No.: 75000099
- Added to NRHP: April 28, 1975

Brown Memorial Library is the public library of Clinton, Maine. It is located in an architecturally distinguished 1899-1900 Richardsonian Romanesque building at 53 Railroad Street in the town center. It was donated to the town by William W. Brown, in honor of his parents. The building was designed by architect John Calvin Stevens and added to the National Register of Historic Places in 1975.

== Architecture and history ==
The Brown Memorial Library is located in the village center of Clinton, at the northeast corner of Railroad and Winn Streets. It is a single-story masonry structure, set on an elevated basement and covered by a hip roof. The building is basically rectangular, with a slight projection to the rear, and a polygonal bay projecting from the front right corner. The main entrance is to that projection's left, set in a rounded arch opening, above which is a gabled wall dormer. The exterior uses materials and coloring typical of the Richardsonian style, with pink-toned granite walls and red sandstone trim. The interior is organized with the large reading room to the right of the entrance, the main stacks to the left, and the former librarian's office, now a children's reading room, to the rear. Also at the rear is a small fireproof vault housing the town's archives.

The library was a gift to the town by William W. Brown, who provided the land, funds for construction, and a seed collection of books, as well as a small endowment for its maintenance. It was the town's first public library. The building was designed by noted Portland architect John Calvin Stevens, and was completed in 1900. It is one of the state's purest expressions of the Richardsonian Romanesque style, as applied to library buildings.

== See also ==
- National Register of Historic Places listings in Kennebec County, Maine
