= Colburn School (Pittston, Maine) =

- U.S. National Register of Historic Places
- Location within Maine Location within the United States
- Location: Arnold Rd., Pittston, Maine
- Coordinates: 44°11′49″N 69°45′4″W
- Area: less than one acre
- Built: 1815
- Architectural style: Early Republic
- NRHP reference No.: 00001633
- Added to NRHP: January 11, 2001

The Colburn School is a historic schoolhouse on Arnold Road in Pittston, Maine. With an estimated construction date of 1815, this brick schoolhouse is the best-preserved of the town's 19th-century district schools, and served for a time as the town hall. Now a local historical society museum, it was listed on the National Register of Historic Places in 2001.

== Description and history ==
The Colburn School is located in southern Pittston, just south of Riverview Cemetery on Arnold Road, an old alignment of nearby Maine State Route 27. It is a single-story brick building, with a gabled roof and a short wood-frame ell extending to its rear. A short gable end faces the street, with a single sash window, while the south facade has the entrance on the left and three sash windows to its right, with rough-cut granite sills and lintels. The ell houses two pit toilets and a wood storage area.

The school is believed to have been built in 1815, the year in which the town established ten school districts. The school was built on land donated by Samuel Oakman as his contribution to the construction costs. The building was used as a school until 1964, and between 1973 and 1985 it was used to house town offices. It has been owned since then by the local historical society, which uses it for meetings and other events. Events are sometimes coordinated with the Arnold Expedition Historical Society, which cares for the nearby Colburn House State Historic Site.

== See also ==
- National Register of Historic Places listings in Kennebec County, Maine
