= Dr. J.W. Ellis House =

Historic house in Maine, United States

- Dr. J. W. Ellis House
- U.S. National Register of Historic Places
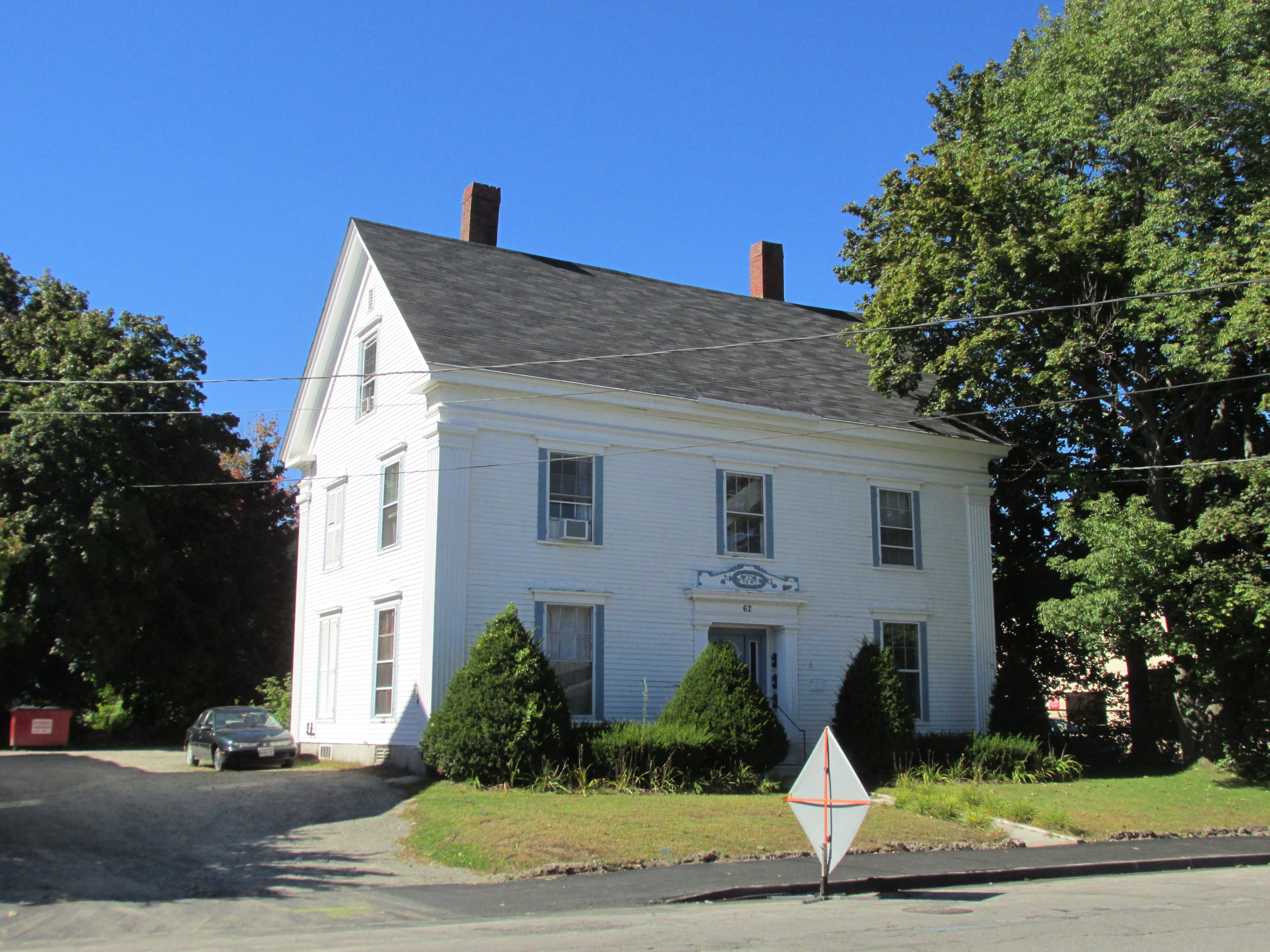

- Location within Maine Location within the United States
- Location: 62 State St., Augusta, Maine
- Coordinates: 44°19′2″N 69°46′38″W
- Area: 0.3 acres (0.12 ha)
- Built: 1855
- Architectural style: Greek Revival
- NRHP reference No.: 79000148
- Added to NRHP: August 15, 1979

The Dr. J.W. Ellis House is a historic house at 62 State Street in Augusta, Maine. Built in 1855 for a prominent local doctor, it is a fine example of late Greek Revival architecture. It was listed on the National Register of Historic Places in 1979.

== Description and history ==
The Ellis House stands west of Augusta's Water Street downtown, on the west side of State Street (Maine State Route 27), opposite its junction with Church Street. State Street is a major north–south route through the city. The house is a 2 1/2-story wood-frame structure, with a gabled roof, clapboard siding, and granite foundation. The main (east-facing) facade is three bays wide, with fluted pilasters at the corners rising to a broad entablature. Windows are sash, topped by narrow corniced entablatures. The main entrance is recessed, with sidelights on either side; the opening around the recess is framed by pilasters and an entablature with a carved floral panel on top. The interior follows a typical center hall plan, with a graceful curving staircase, and original woodwork in many of the rooms.

The house was built about 1855 for Dr. Joseph Willard Ellis, and is a fine example of late Greek Revival design; its designer is not known. Dr. Ellis served for many years as Augusta's city physician and in private practice. The house was a private residence until 1970, when it was purchased by the Maine Democratic Party for use as its headquarters.

== See also ==
- National Register of Historic Places listings in Kennebec County, Maine
