= Philip Leach House =

Historic house in Maine, United States

- U.S. National Register of Historic Places
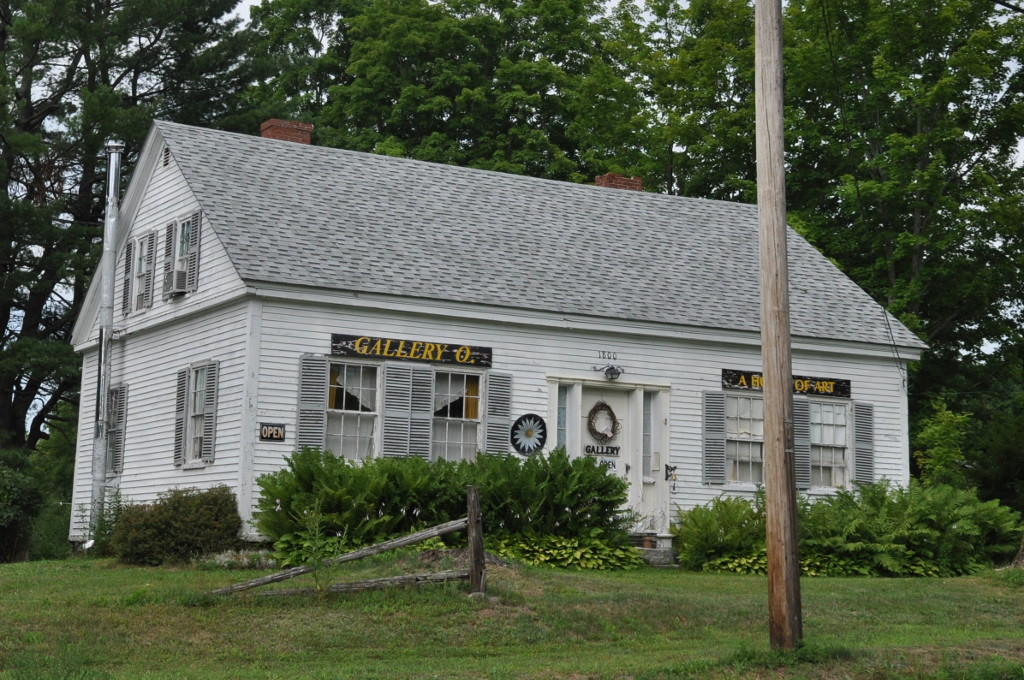

- Location within Maine Location within the United States
- Location: Bog Rd., East Vassalboro, Maine
- Coordinates: 44°26′54″N 69°36′33″W
- Area: 0.3 acres (0.12 ha)
- Built: 1805
- Architect: Eaton, Moses
- Architectural style: Federal, Federal Style Cape
- NRHP reference No.: 83003644
- Added to NRHP: October 20, 1983

The Philip Leach House is a historic house on Bog Road in East Vassalboro, Maine. Built about 1805, it is a well-preserved local example of a Federal style Cape house. It is notable for the stencilwork and floor painting in its parlor, which are the work of the itinerant folk art stenciler Moses Eaton Jr. The house was listed on the National Register of Historic Places in 1983.

== Description and history ==
The Philip Leach House stands on the west side of the village of East Vassalboro, on the north side of Bog Road just west of the public library. It is a 1 1/2-story wood-frame structure, with a gable roof and clapboarded exterior. Its main facade is five bays wide, with a central entrance flanked by sidelight windows. The parlor, located on the left side of the building, has been extensively adorned with stencilwork. The artwork is painted in green, red, and yellow, and includes abstract and floral designs. The original floorboards were also painted, with leaf patterns executed in freehand.

The house was built about 1805 for Philip Leach, by a lawyer who also served as East Vassalboro's postmaster. The artwork in the parlor was executed, probably by Moses Eaton Jr., not long before he gave up his itinerant artwork and settled down in New Hampshire as a farmer. It was probably executed around 1825, and was covered by wallpaper not long afterward. It was exposed during restoration in the early 1980s.

== See also ==
- National Register of Historic Places listings in Kennebec County, Maine
