= Jon Lund Site =

Archaeological site in Manchester, Maine, U.S.

- U.S. National Register of Historic Places
- Location: Manchester, Maine, U.S.
- Area: 0.1 acres (0.040 ha)
- NRHP reference No.: 80000234
- Added to NRHP: November 21, 1980

The Jon Lund Site is a prehistoric archaeological site on the shore of Cobbosseecontee Lake in Manchester, Maine. The site is located in a depression that provides shelter from prevailing winds, and has a Middle Archaic component, in which stone tool artifacts and calcified bones have been found. Bone finds include those of snakes and turtles, suggesting the terrain in the area was marshy at the time of its occupation.

The site was listed on the National Register of Historic Places in 1980.

== See also ==
- National Register of Historic Places listings in Kennebec County, Maine
