= Brick School =

- U.S. National Register of Historic Places
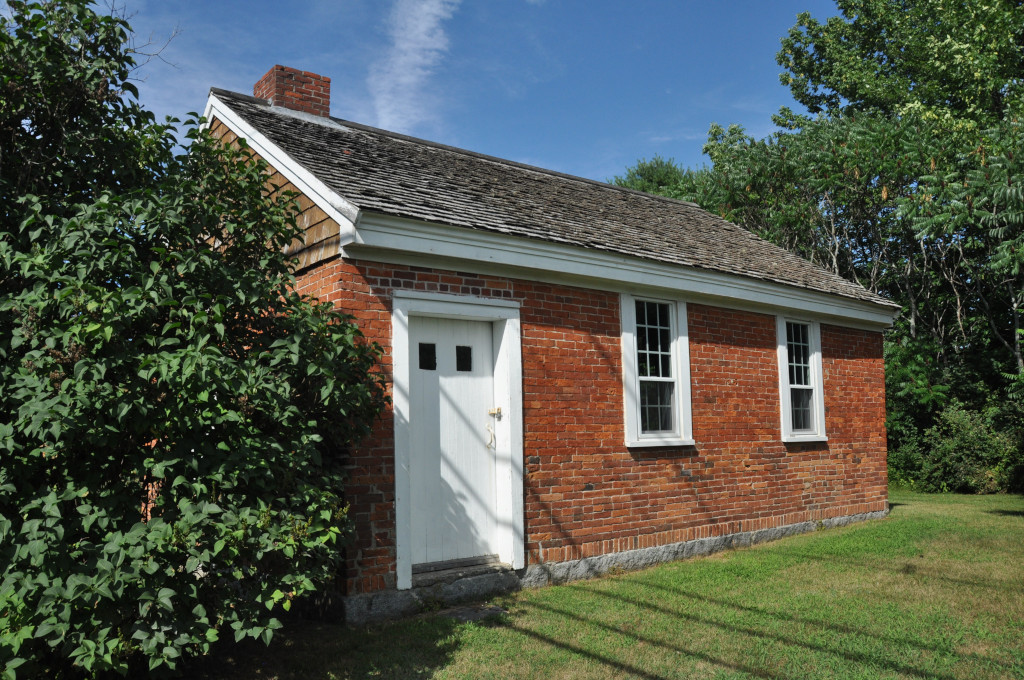

- Location within Maine Location within the United States
- Location: Cushman Rd., Winslow, Maine
- Coordinates: 44°30′31.6″N 69°37′50.6″W
- Area: 0.5 acres (0.20 ha)
- Built: 1810
- NRHP reference No.: 77000068
- Added to NRHP: April 18, 1977

The Brick School is a historic one-room schoolhouse on Cushman Road in Winslow, Maine. Built about 1810, it is one of the oldest surviving district schools in the state of Maine. It was listed on the National Register of Historic Places in 1977, and is now owned and maintained by the town's historic preservation committee

== Description and history ==
The Brick School is located on the east side of Cushman Road in the rural southern part of the town of Winslow. It is a small single-story brick building, with a gabled roof that has clapboarded gables, and a stone foundation. It is oriented facing south, with the gable ridge perpendicular to the street. The main facade is three bays wide, with the entrance in the left bay, and sash windows in the other two. The north facade also has two sash windows, while the street-facing west facade has no openings. The interior has a small coatroom and fireplace on the west, with the classroom occupying most of the space.

The school's construction date is uncertain from surviving town records, but it is known to have been built sometime between 1799 and 1820, when it is mentioned in a deed. It was used as a school until 1865, and remained vacant or used as storage until 1972, when the Winslow Historical Society acquired it. The Society lapsed due to inactivity, and its functions have since been taken over by the town.

== See also ==
- National Register of Historic Places listings in Kennebec County, Maine
