= Foster-Redington House =

Historic house in Maine, United States

- U.S. National Register of Historic Places
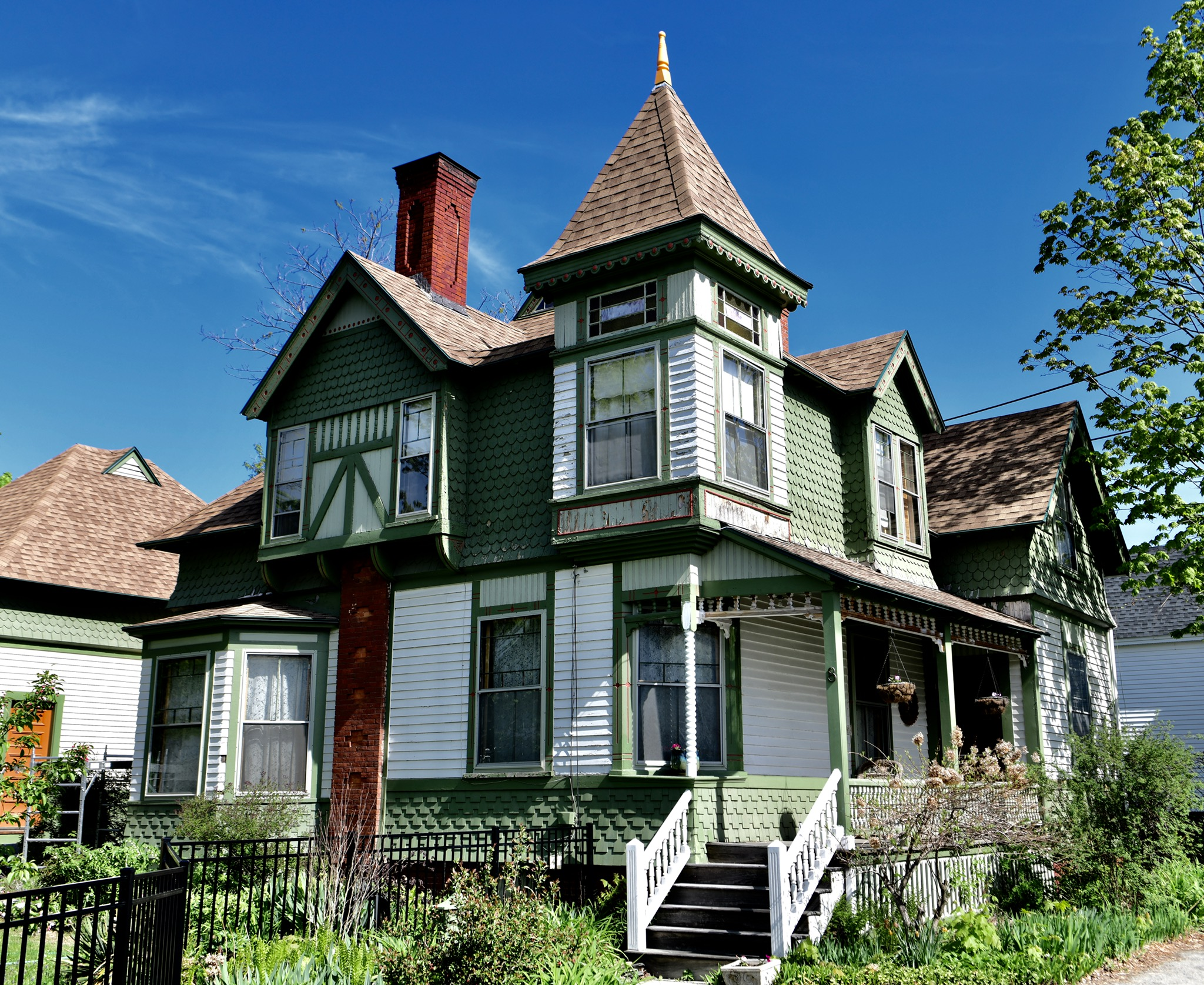

- Location within Maine Location within the United States
- Location: 8 Park Pl. Waterville, Maine
- Coordinates: 44°33′8″N 69°38′1″W
- Area: less than one acre
- Built: 1883
- Architectural style: Queen Anne
- NRHP reference No.: 14000138
- Added to NRHP: April 11, 2014

The Foster-Redington House is a historic house at 8 Park Place in Waterville, Maine. Built in 1883, it is a fine example of Queen Anne architecture, supposedly the city's first example of the style. It was built by Moses Coburn Foster, a well-known builder in the state, as his private residence. Moses owned M.C. Foster & Son, general contractors and builders. An advertisement for the business lists its location as 7 Park Place, which was the home built for his son, Herbert Foster. Herbert died at 38 years old. Herbert's home is as unique as Moses' but has not been restored, but instead, turned into two apartments.

Moses was born in Newry in 1827. His father, Benjamin Foster, was a Methodist minister for fifty years. His mother was Lovisa Coburn of Tyngsboro, Massachusetts. Moses married in 1849 Francina Smith of Bethel, Maine. Foster built the Grand Trunk Railroad at Island Pond; the Calvary Baptist Church in Washington, D.C.; the addition of the Maine State House; post-offices at Houlton, Skowhegan, and Bangor; the East Maine Insane Asylum and Maine Central Station at Brunswick; and many churches (Bethel, Andover, Rumford and Houlton). (American Series of Popular Biographies, pages 274–276).

8 Park Place became the home to Carrie Foster Redington, daughter of Moses and teacher before her marriage at the Mill Street Primary School (according to the 1887 Waterville Directory), and her husband, Frank Redington, a businessman, city mayor and civic leader. It was listed on the National Register of Historic Places in 2014 after nomination by its current owner, Nancy J. Williams, a native of Savannah, Georgia. Nancy purchased the house July 2, 2012 while still working as the executive director of Lake George Land Conservancy in Bolton Landing, NY. She moved to the house from Queensbury, NY, around January 2016. Major projects completed by Nancy included shingling the roof, removal of knob and tube wiring, replacement with modern wiring, restoration of the front porch's steps and upper spindles, restoration of the master bedroom's ceiling, and restoration of rooms to their original condition of between 1883 and 1910. Bruce and Amy Bernard, the previous owners, had replaced rotting shingles on the lower level with accurate copies, rebuilt a rear chimney and remodeled the kitchen and bathrooms.

== Description and history ==
The Foster-Redington House stands in central Waterville, at the end of Park Place, a spur projecting north from the mainly residential Park Street. Moses Foster had earlier built or lived in a house on Park Street which abutted (more recently named Veteran's Park), then a cemetery. That house is no longer extant. 8 Park Place is a two-story wood-frame structure, with asymmetrical massing typical of the Queen Anne period. It has several projecting gable sections, and a square turret at the front corner, partially overhanging a single-story porch. The exterior is finished in a combination of decorative shingles and wooden clapboards, with some applied Stick style woodwork and vergeboard. The original carriage shed is attached but lost its corner, diagonal entrance from a fire. The interior has retained some of its original features, most notably the entrance hallway with formal fireplace and "mahogany woodwork" and stairs. The original kitchen, now the dining room, had faux-oak cabinets that were moved to a newly constructed hallway made by partitioning off the old kitchen with built-in cabinets with glass doors. The tin ceilings, chandeliers, and fluted Doric columns in the opening between the parlor and library were most likely added by Carrie and Frank Redington in a remodeling of the home, possibly as late as 1906, after the death of Moses Foster. Frank owned a furniture store on Silver Street where he was found dead on February 14, 1923, by a gun wound to his head, reported as self-inflicted. A newspaper reported that Frank had been ill for many years. While President of the Waterville Board of Trade and mayor of the city, Frank pushed vigorously to build a new city hall. Many of the larger industries in the city, including Lockwood Company, fought the project. After seven years the matter was finally settled by the Maine Supreme Court after fourteen months of deliberation. Frank also worked to secure $250,000 for the construction of the Federal Post Office on the corner of Main and Elm Streets, now sadly in disrepair. While mayor, land for the "Gilman Street" high school was purchased and its construction began. Carrie lived another thirty years in the house, dying December 24, 1953. .

== See also ==
- National Register of Historic Places listings in Kennebec County, Maine
