= Hallowell Powder House =

- Powder House Lot
- U.S. National Register of Historic Places
- Location within Maine Location within the United States
- Location: High St., 0.25 miles (0.40 km) S. of jct. with Winthrop St., Hallowell, Maine
- Coordinates: 44°17′19″N 69°48′0″W
- Area: 0.3 acres (0.12 ha)
- Built: 1819
- Architectural style: Brick Utilitarian Enclosure
- NRHP reference No.: 02000348
- Added to NRHP: April 11, 2002

The Hallowell Powder House is a historic military storage facility on High Street in Hallowell, Maine. Built in 1819, it is one of three documented early 19th-century arms magazines in the state. It was listed on the National Register of Historic Places in 2002 as the Powder House Lot.

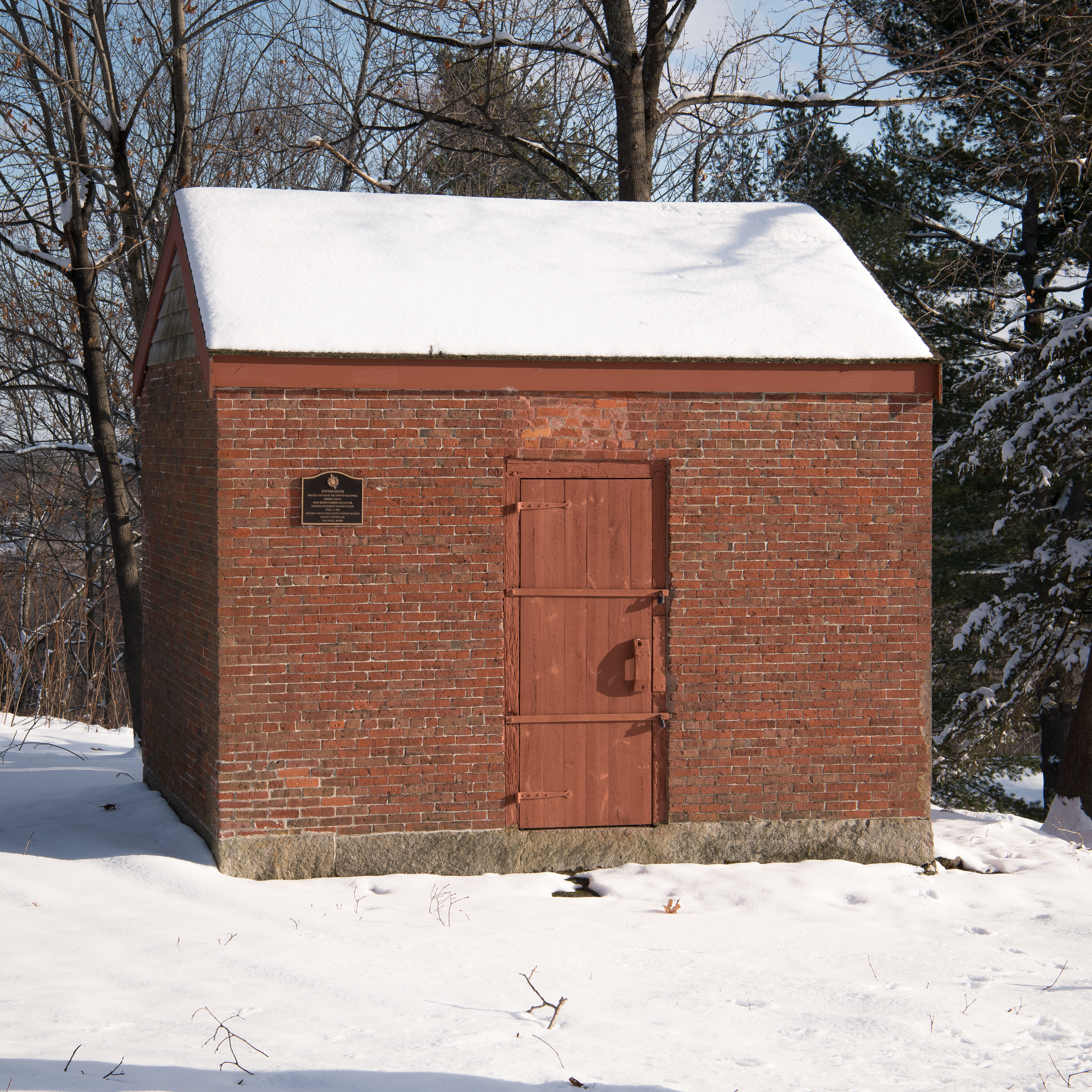
Hallowell Powder House

== Description and history ==
The Hallowell Powder House stands on the east side of High Street, roughly midway between Central and Winthrop Streets, on a hillside lot with views of the Kennebec River and downtown Hallowell to the east. it is a small brick building, with a gabled roof and granite foundation. There are no windows, and a single wooden door on one of the long sides. A portion of one wall has been rebuilt using wood framing, and is finished in wooden clapboards. The interior is spare, its walls lined by shelving made of two-inch planking that has been mortared to the walls and is further supported by centered wooden elements. There is evidence of old roofing under the existing roofing material.

Although it was traditionally ascribed a construction date of 1813 (during the War of 1812), town records show that its construction was authorized in 1819. At that time Maine was about to become a state independent of Massachusetts, and pride in the local militia was at a high. After border disputes with neighboring New Brunswick were resolved in 1842, militia requirements in the state were relaxed, and the powder house fell out of service. In 1943, the town sold the property to the local chapter of the Daughters of the American Revolution.

== See also ==
- National Register of Historic Places listings in Kennebec County, Maine
