= Ella R. Hodgkins Intermediate School =

- U.S. National Register of Historic Places
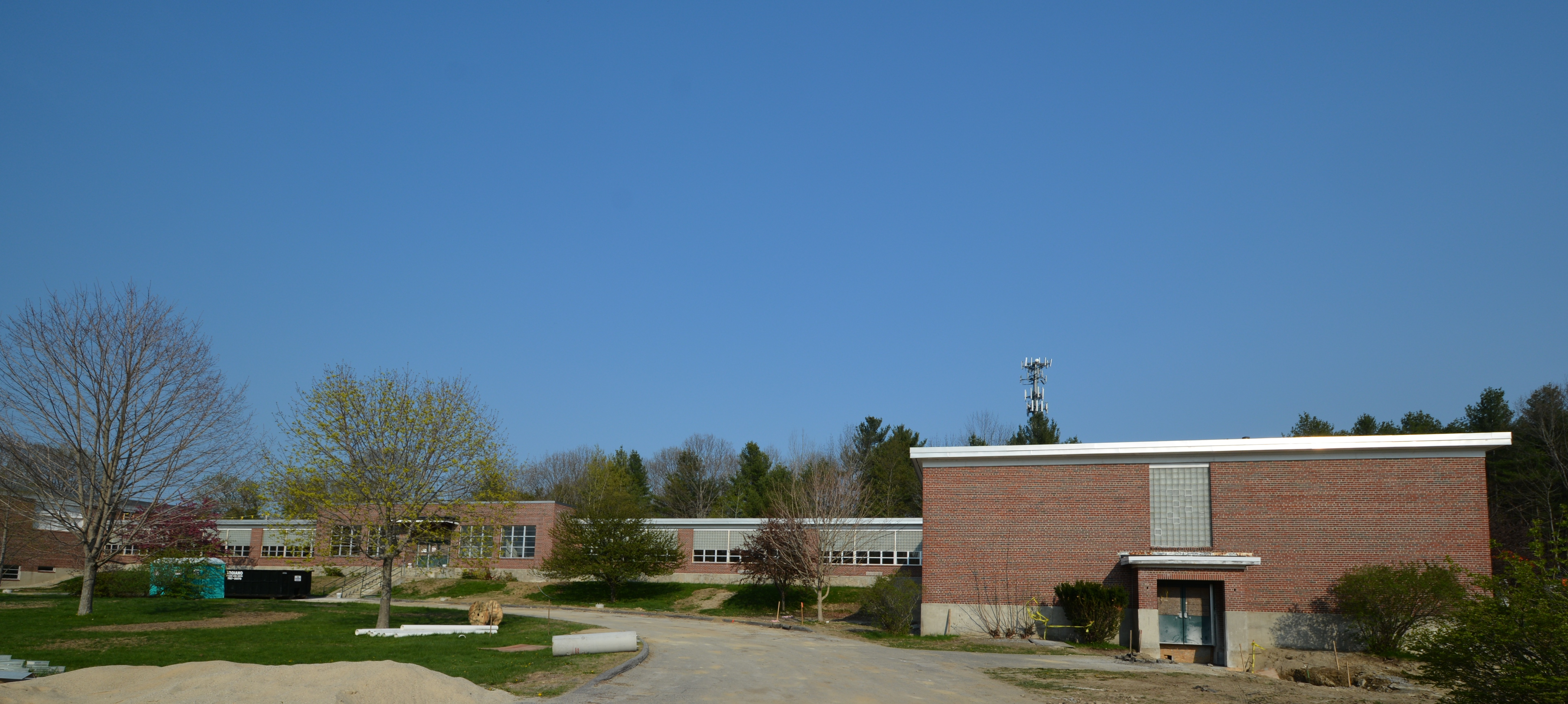

- Location within Maine Location within the United States
- Location: 17 Malta St., Augusta, Maine
- Coordinates: 44°18′58″N 69°45′26″W
- Area: 20 acres (8.1 ha)
- Built: 1958
- Architect: Bunker & Savage
- Architectural style: Modern Movement
- NRHP reference No.: 15000417
- Added to NRHP: July 14, 2015

The Ella R. Hodgkins Intermediate School, also known as the Hodgkins Middle School, is a historic school building at 17 Malta Street in Augusta, Maine, U.S. Built in 1958, it is a well-preserved example of a mid-20th century Modern Movement school building. Its construction marked the end of a major push by the city to modernize its facilities. It was used as a school until 2009. It was listed on the National Register of Historic Places in 2015.

== Description and history ==
The former Hodgkins school stands on Augusta's predominantly residential east side, occupying a large parcel on the east side of Malta Street. The building is a sprawling U-shaped single-story structure, with a flat roof, brick exterior, and concrete block foundation. It is accessed via a semicircular drive that runs through the interior of the U, with the main entrance at the center of the U's base. Windows are modern aluminum ribbon sash.

The school was built in 1958 to a design by the local architectural firm of Bunker & Savage. It was the last of three primary schools built by the city as part of a program by the city to modernize its schools, made in response to a post-World War II population boom. The other two, the Hussey and Buker Schools, have both been substantially altered, and the program's final element, an annex to the Old Cony High School, has been demolished. This school was used until 2009, when its students were reassigned to the new high school. It is presently used for apartments.

== See also ==
- National Register of Historic Places listings in Kennebec County, Maine
