= Blossom House =

Historic house in Maine, United States

- U.S. National Register of Historic Places
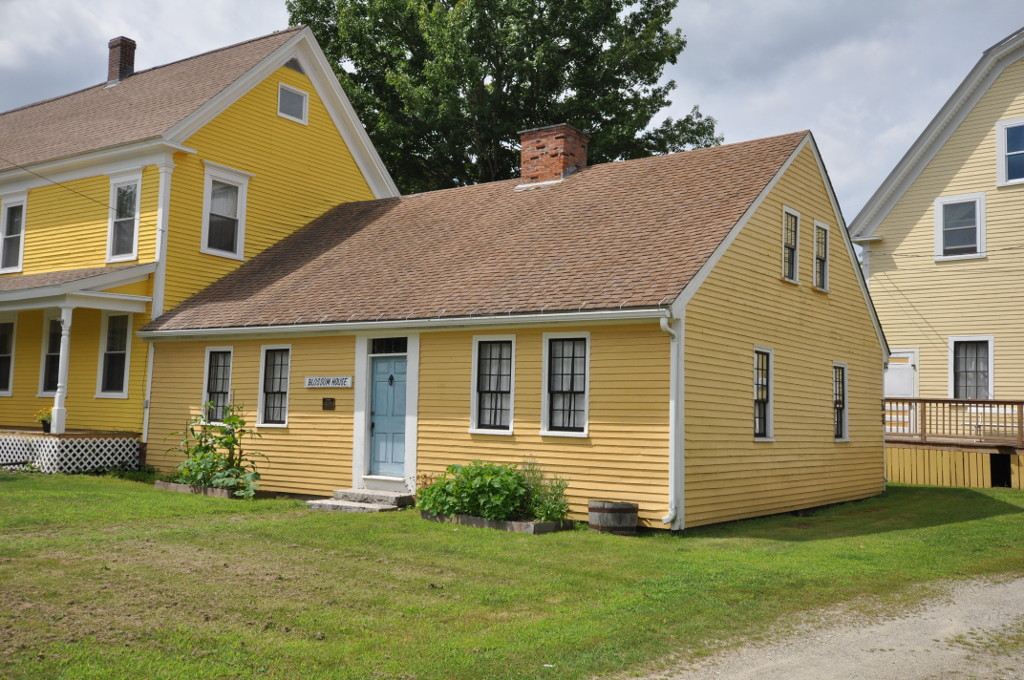

- Location within Maine Location within the United States
- Location: Main St., Monmouth, Maine
- Coordinates: 44°14′16″N 70°2′12″W
- Area: Less than one acre
- Built: 1808
- Architectural style: Federal
- NRHP reference No.: 89000250
- Added to NRHP: April 7, 1989

The Blossom House is a historic house museum on Main Street in Monmouth, Maine. Built about 1808, it is a well-preserved example of a Federal period Cape style house. It was listed on the National Register of Historic Places in 1989, and now serves as a museum for the local historical society.

== Description and history ==
The Blossom House stands in the village of Monmouth, on the west side of Main Street (Maine State Route 132), just south of the Flanders Drive loop which traverses the Monmouth Historical Society's property. The house is a single-story wood-frame structure, five bays wide, with a side gable roof, central chimney, and granite foundation. The windows are simply framed, and the entrance is adorned by a five-pane transom window. The interior follows a typical central chimney plan, with a narrow entry vestibule leading to the parlor (right) and kitchen (left). In the rear of the house is a large bedroom with small chambers to either side. The house is attached on its south end to a larger two-story frame building.

The house was probably built about 1808 by Ansel Blossom, a farmer. It originally had a small addition on the south side, which was replaced in the late 19th century by the present two-story building, when the property was adapted for use as a hotel. It is the town's only surviving example of early 19th-century residential architecture, retaining period interior and exterior finishes.

== See also ==
- National Register of Historic Places listings in Kennebec County, Maine
