= Algernon Bangs House =

Historic house in Maine, United States

- U.S. National Register of Historic Places
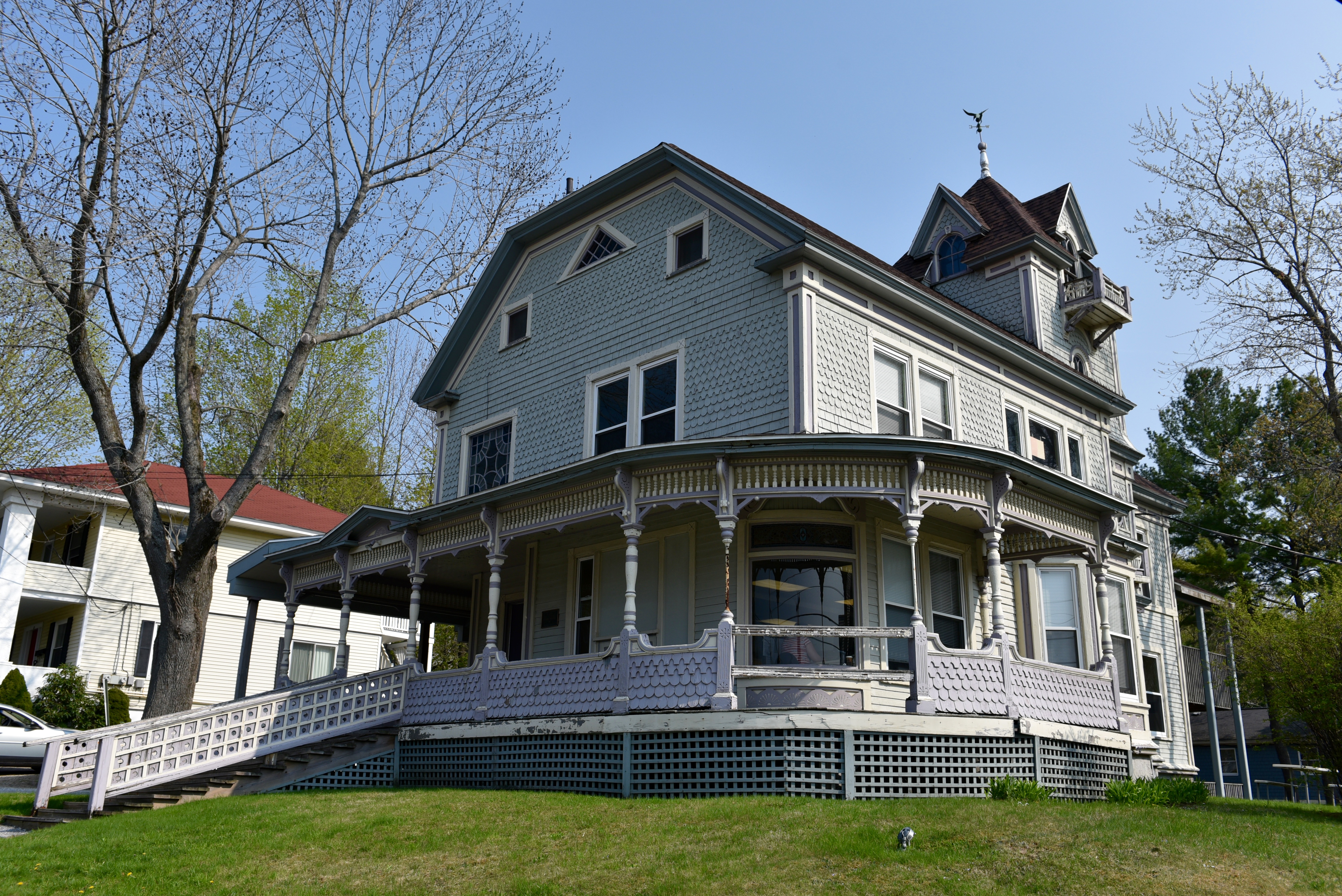

- Location within Maine Location within the United States
- Location: 16 E. Chestnut St., Augusta, Maine
- Coordinates: 44°18′47″N 69°46′2″W
- Area: 0.5 acres (0.20 ha)
- Built: 1892
- Architectural style: Queen Anne
- NRHP reference No.: 82000751
- Added to NRHP: February 19, 1982

The Algernon Bangs House is a historic house at 16 East Chestnut Street in Augusta, Maine. Built in 1892, it is a distinctive and idiosyncratic exhibition of Queen Anne architecture. It was listed on the National Register of Historic Places in 1982, and now houses professional offices.

== Description and history ==
The Bangs House stands in eastern Augusta, on the south side of Chestnut Street, a short way east of the Kennebec Pediatrics medical center. It is a 2 1/2-story wood-frame structure, with a clipped gable roof, foundation of brick and stone, and exterior finished in wooden clapboards and shingles. The front (north-facing) facade is two bays wide, with a single-story porch wrapping around to both sides. The porch has a spindled valance, turned posts, and carved brackets, and a balustrade covered by scalloped shingles. The windows on the upper levels are of unusual sizes and shapes, including two small square windows and a triangular fixed-pane window just below the clipped gable. The west facade faces St. Catherine Street, and is dominated by a three-story tower topped by a pyramidal roof with flared lower section.

The house was built in 1892 for Algernon Sydney Bangs, a native of Farmington who made his fortune in the construction of doors and windows. Bangs was somewhat eccentric, and the house's unusual elements may have the result of his input to its design. (Bangs predicted in 1897 that "flying machines will eventually become modes of public conveyance".) The house was purchased in 1922 by Augusta General Hospital as housing for nurses, and now houses professional medical offices.

== See also ==
- National Register of Historic Places listings in Kennebec County, Maine
