= Foster Farm Barn =

- U.S. National Register of Historic Places
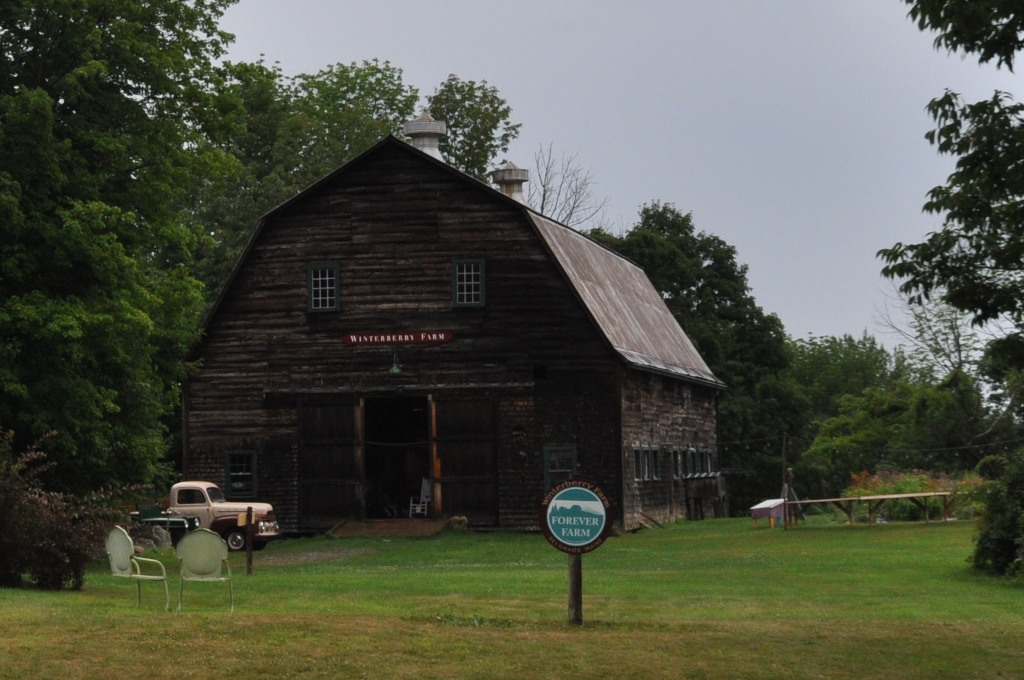

- Location within Maine Location within the United States
- Location: 538 Augusta Rd., Belgrade, Maine
- Coordinates: 44°29′28″N 69°51′21″W
- Area: less than one acre
- Built: c. 1905
- NRHP reference No.: 15000768
- Added to NRHP: November 9, 2015

The Foster Farm Barn is a historic dairy barn at 538 Augusta Road in Belgrade, Maine. Built sometime between 1900 and 1910, it is a well-preserved example of a barn built during a transitional period between mixed-use farming and specialized dairy farming. It was listed on the National Register of Historic Places in 2015.

== Description and history ==
The Foster Farm Barn is located on the property currently known as Water Dance Farm, in northern Belgrade, on the east side of Augusta Road (Maine State Route 27), just south of its junction with Point and Guptil Roads. It is set back from the road, behind the farmstand used for public sales, and north of the c. 1900 farmhouse. It is a two-story timber-frame structure with a gambrel roof. It is about 70 by 41 feet (21 m × 12 m) in size, and exhibits construction techniques common to the period after the American Civil War. It also includes features that were considered modern in the early 20th century for dairy farming purposes, including concrete manure troughs, ventilation slats in the walls, and specialized ducting to facilitate the movement of air to ventilators in the roof. The lower level of the barn is finished in original wooden shingles, while the upper levels of the walls are unfinished, with exposed sheathing.

The barn was built sometime in the first decade of the 20th century, by brothers Frank and Edgar Foster, whose parents had farmed the property since the late 1850s. It (and construction of the house) may have been funded as the result of one of the brothers receiving an inheritance. It was a clear departure from traditional New England barns of the 19th century, which typically had space for only a small number of livestock. The Foster brothers were reported in 1902 to have a dairy herd of fifteen cows, in addition to two each horses, oxen, and pigs. The barn's interior is clearly organized to support a focused dairy operation.

== See also ==
- National Register of Historic Places listings in Kennebec County, Maine
