= Whitehouse Block =

- U.S. National Register of Historic Places
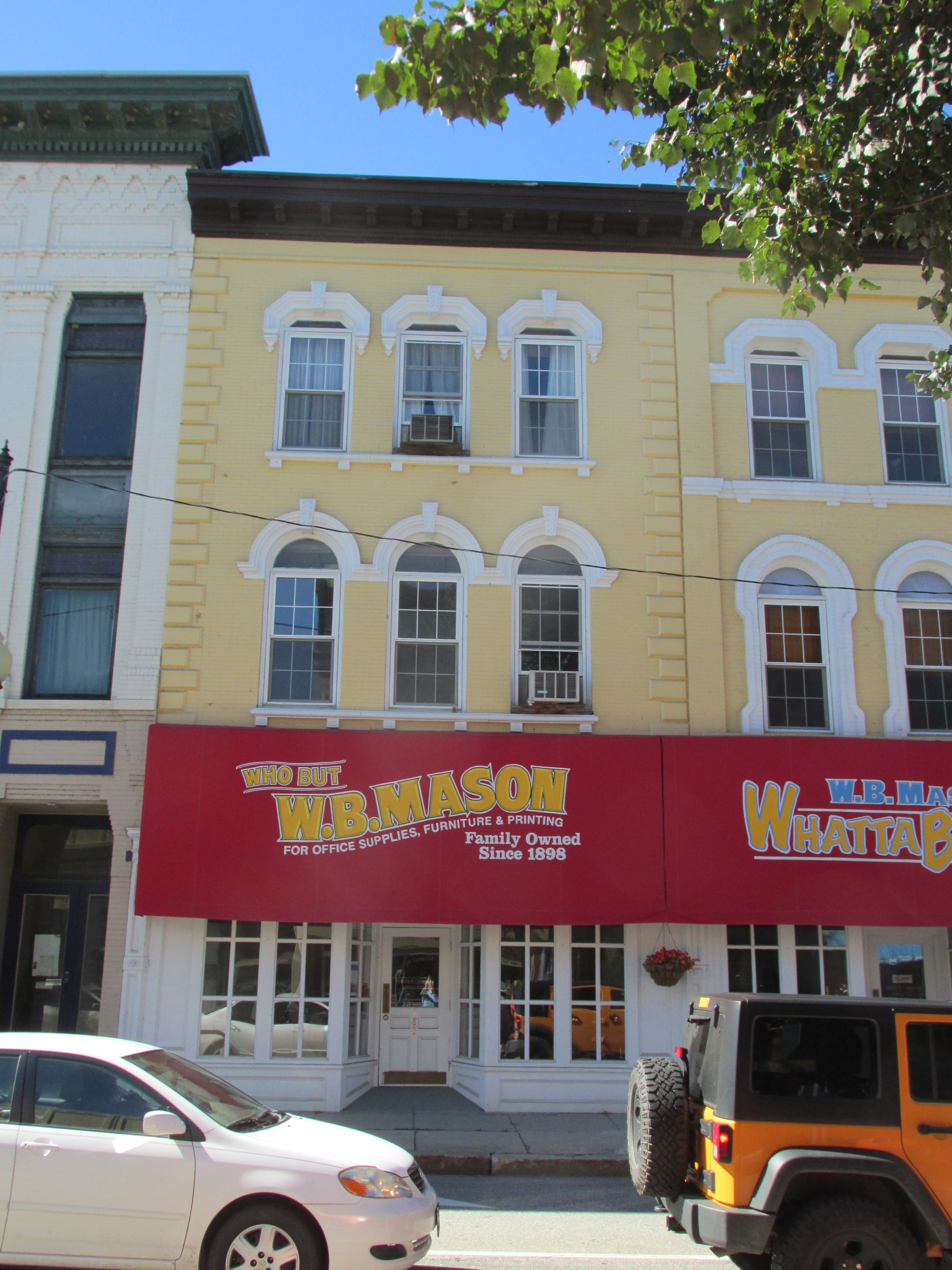

- Location within Maine
- Location: 188 Water St., Augusta, Maine
- Coordinates: 44°19′0″N 69°46′27″W
- Area: 0.3 acres (0.12 ha)
- Built: 1865
- Architect: Fassett, Francis H.
- Architectural style: Italianate
- MPS: Augusta Central Business District MRA
- NRHP reference No.: 86001698
- Added to NRHP: May 2, 1986

The Whitehouse Block is a historic commercial building at 188 Water Street in downtown Augusta, Maine. Built in 1865, it is one of a series of four Italianate commercial buildings built in the wake of a devastating 1865 fire. It was listed on the National Register of Historic Places in 1986.

== Description and history ==
The Whitehouse Block stands on the west side of Water Street, Augusta's principal commercial downtown thoroughfare, just south of its junction with Bridge Street. It is the southernmost of a series of four three-story brick Italianate commercial buildings, running south from that corner, which share a common roof line. The building has a projecting modillioned cornice, quoining at the corners, and a storefront with recessed entry. Second floor windows have rounded hoods and bracketed sills, while those on the third floor have more elaborate hoods.

All four of these buildings were built beginning in 1865, after a fire devastated Augusta's downtown. This building was designed by Francis H. Fassett, Maine's preeminent architect of the time, and was built for O.C. Whitehouse, a dry goods merchant. He operated his store out of the building's second floor, while the first floor had as early tenants the Augusta Savings Bank and the United States Pension Agency. The third floor was occupied by fraternal societies. The building continues to see commercial use.

== See also ==
- National Register of Historic Places listings in Kennebec County, Maine
