= Doughty Block =

- U.S. National Register of Historic Places
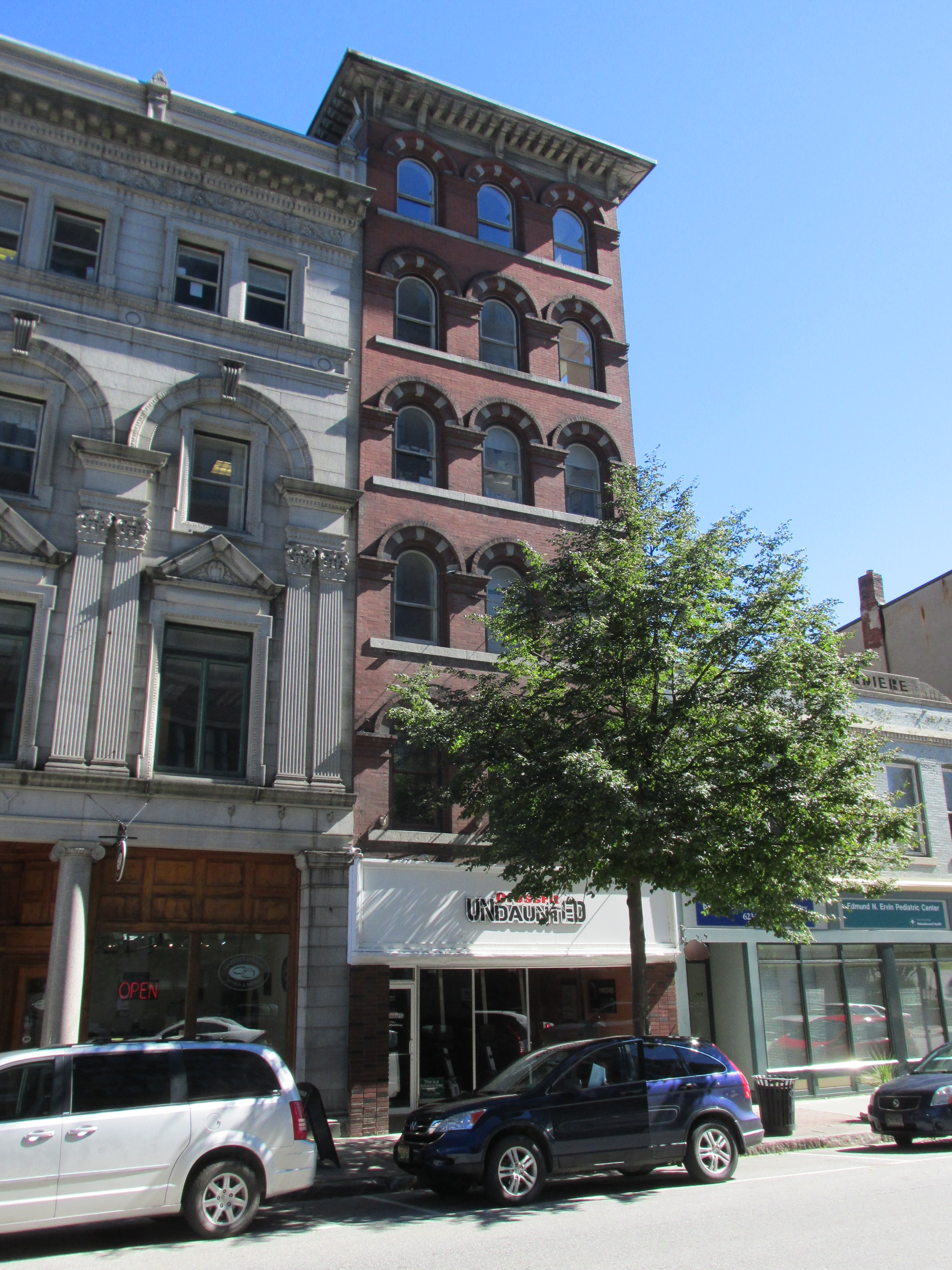

- Location within Maine Location within the United States
- Location: 265 Water St., Augusta, Maine
- Coordinates: 44°18′55″N 69°46′28″W
- Area: 0.2 acres (0.081 ha)
- Built: 1890
- Built by: Charles Fletcher
- Architectural style: Italianate
- MPS: Augusta Central Business District MRA
- NRHP reference No.: 86001691
- Added to NRHP: May 2, 1986

The Doughty Block is a historic commercial building at 265 Water Street in downtown Augusta, Maine. Built in 1890, it is the downtown's only example of a 19th-century high rise. It was listed on the National Register of Historic Places in 1986.

== Description and history ==
The Doughty Block stands in Augusta's downtown commercial district, on the east side of Water Street, opposite the Key Plaza just north of Front Street. It is a six-story masonry structure, noticeably taller than the other 19th-century buildings lining the east side of Water Street. It is built out of red brick with stone trim. The front facade is three bays wide, with a modern storefront (c. 1970) on the ground floor. The upper levels are divided by stone stringcourses, emphasizing the building horizontally, and its windows are set in round-arch openings, whose voussoirs alternate between stone and brick. It has a project cornice at the top, studded with a combination of Italianate brackets and modillions.

The block was built in 1890 for Charles Doughty by Charles Fletcher, a prominent local builder. The building's styling is somewhat retardaire, as the Italianate was out of fashion when it was built. However, the styling of the windows gives it a suggestion of Renaissance style, which was then coming into fashion.

== See also ==
- National Register of Historic Places listings in Kennebec County, Maine
