= Heald House =

Historic house in Maine, United States

- U.S. National Register of Historic Places
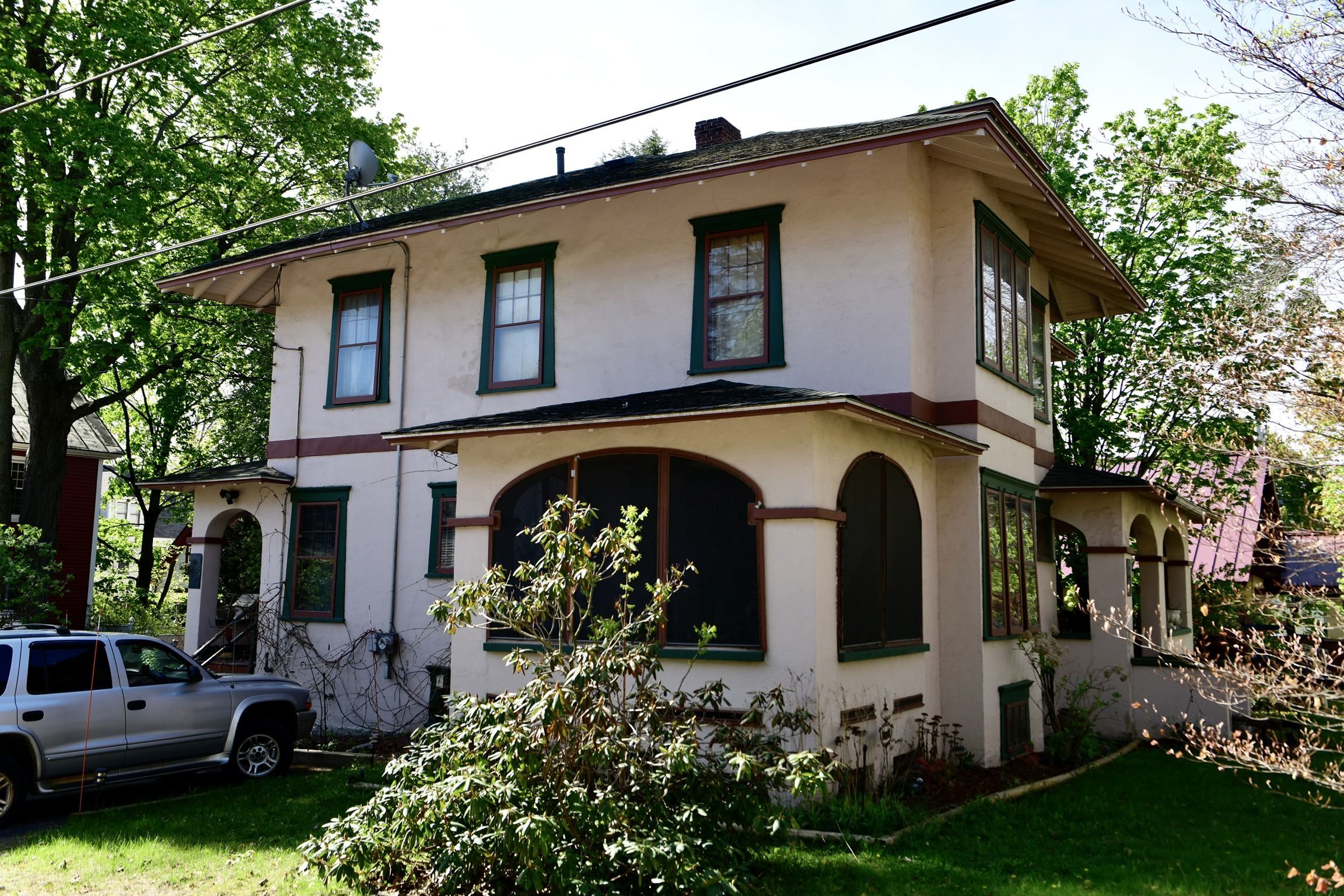

- Location within Maine Location within the United States
- Location: 19 West St. Waterville, Maine
- Coordinates: 44°33′13″N 69°38′14″W
- Area: 0.2 acres (0.081 ha)
- Built: 1916
- Architect: Knapp, Herbert E.
- Architectural style: Prairie School, Bungalow/craftsman
- NRHP reference No.: 05000058
- Added to NRHP: February 15, 2005

The Heald House is a historic house at 19 West Street in Waterville, Maine. Built in 1916 to a design by Herbert E. Knapp, it is the city's only substantial example of Prairie School architecture. It was listed on the National Register of Historic Places in 2005.

== Description and history ==
The Heald House stands in a residential area west of downtown Waterville, at the southeast corner of West and Carroll Streets. It is a two-story wood-frame structure, with a hip roof, stuccoed walls, and a concrete foundation, and is scaled to fit in with the surrounding Colonial Revival and Queen Anne houses. It exhibits a mix of Craftsman and Prairie School features, the latter including extended eaves, and the former its exposed rafters. To the left of the main block a single-story enclosed porch projects, its openings consisting of rounded arches. The arches are repeated in the main entry porch, located on the right side of the front facade. The interior of the building retains original decorative materials, including mahogany French doors, parquet flooring, and marble thresholds.

The house was built in 1916 for Arthur and Helen Heald, who were Massachusetts natives. The house was designed by Herbert E. Knapp, a Waterville native who worked in the area, primarily as a building contractor, only until 1918. It is his only known architectural commission in the state, and is one of the state's few examples of Prairie School architecture.

== See also ==
- National Register of Historic Places listings in Kennebec County, Maine
