= Edmund and Rachel Clark Homestead =

Historic house in Maine, United States

- U.S. National Register of Historic Places
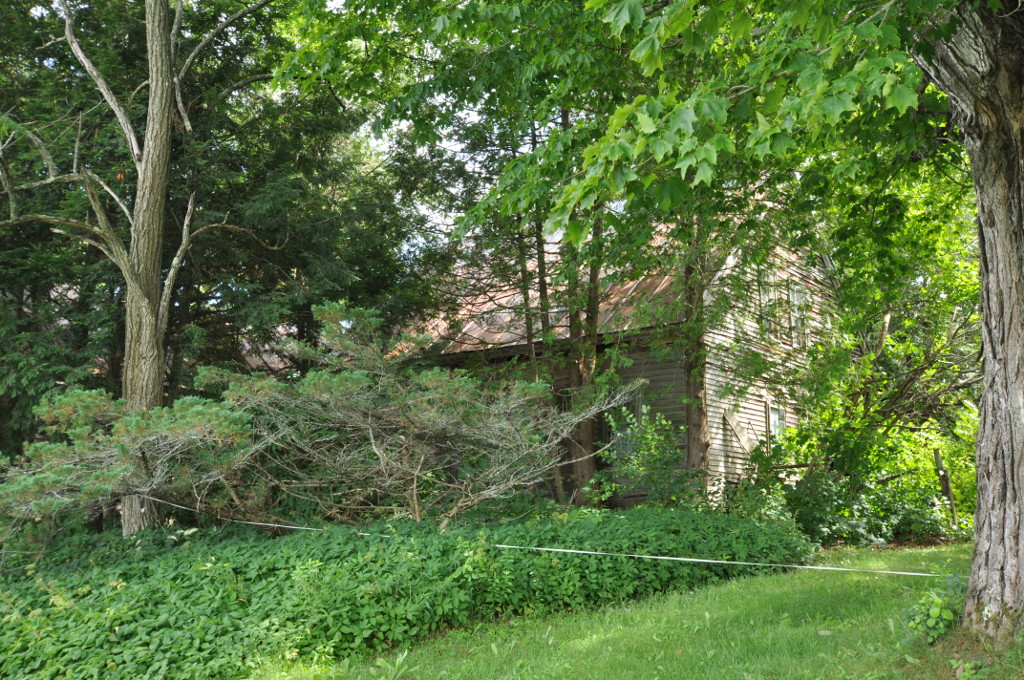
- Location: China, Maine
- Area: 15 acres (6.1 ha)
- Built: 1789
- Architectural style: Federal
- NRHP reference No.: 06000921
- Added to NRHP: October 4, 2006

The Edmund and Rachel Clark Homestead is a historic farmstead in China, Maine. The property was developed beginning late in 18th century by one of the town's first settlers. It includes a house whose oldest portion dates to about 1789 and was never fitted with modern heat, plumbing, or electricity, and the archaeological remains of farm outbuildings. It was listed on the National Register of Historic Places in 2006.

== Description and history ==
The Clark Homestead is located on the west side of China Lake, a Y-shaped body of water that extends north–south across much of the rural community. The main feature of the 15-acre (6.1 ha) property is the surviving farmhouse, a single-story wood-frame structure. The house is set on a knoll above the lake, and is surrounded by overgrown vegetation. It was built in two parts: the main section is a four-bay Cape style structure facing west, to which a north-facing Cape was appended in the early 19th century. The main entrance features a Greek Revival surround, with sidelight windows and pilasters flanking the door, and a broad entablature above. The interior retains period woodwork, although the original large central chimney has been removed, and its space converted into a food storage area.

The property on which the Clark Homestead stands was settled in 1774 by Edmund and Rachel Clark, Quakers who were among the early settlers of China along with other members of their family. Edmund Clark was prominent in community affairs, serving at times as tax collector, town constable, and selectman. The property was owned and farmed by generations of Clark descendants, with the house occupied until 2001. Its only modern amenity was a telephone.

== See also ==
- National Register of Historic Places listings in Kennebec County, Maine
