= D.V. Adams Co.-Bussell and Weston =

- U.S. National Register of Historic Places
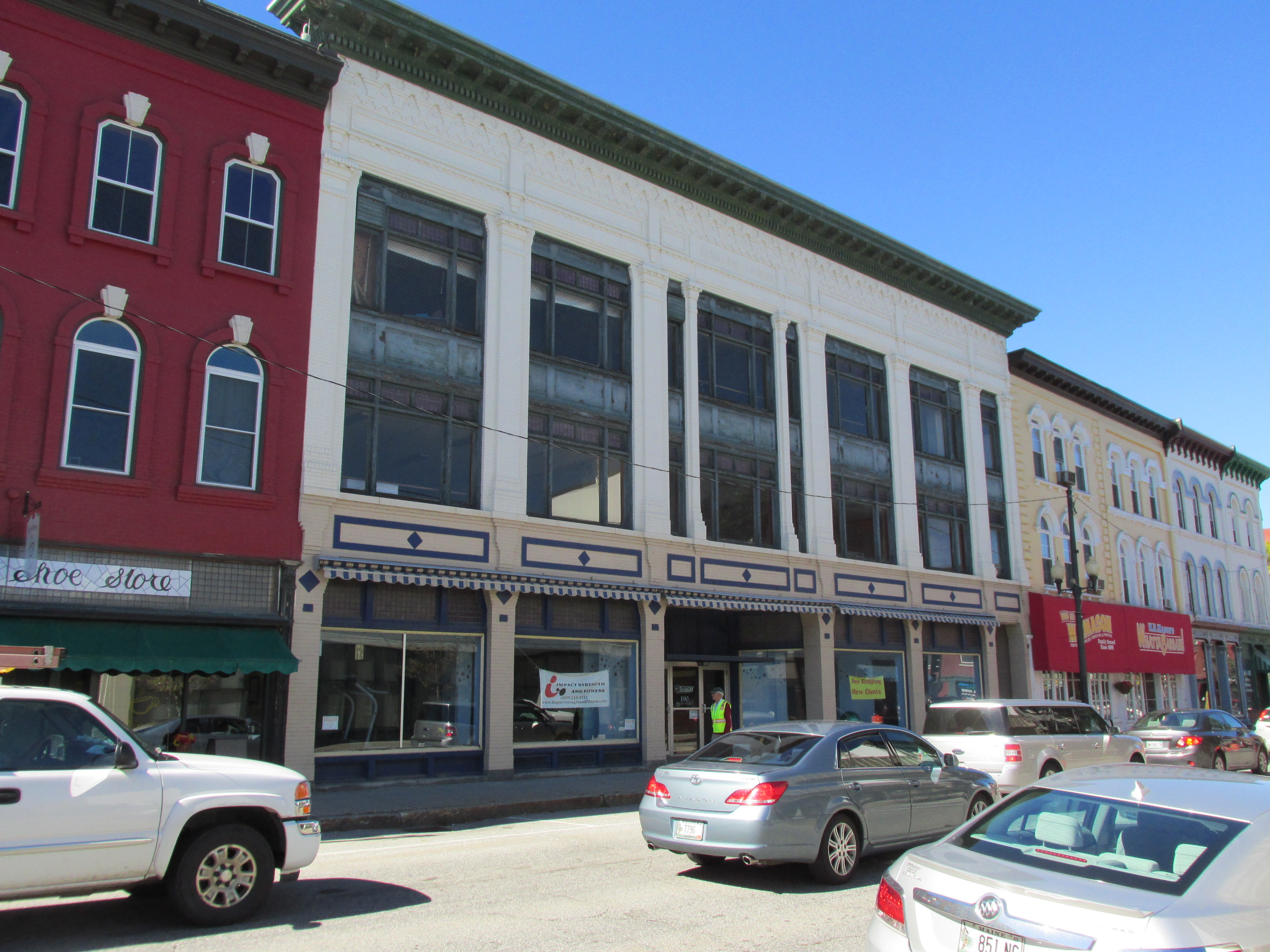

- Location within Maine Location within the United States
- Location: 190 Water St., Augusta, Maine
- Coordinates: 44°18′59″N 69°46′28″W
- Area: 0.3 acres (0.12 ha)
- Built: 1909
- Architect: Freeman, Funk & Wilcox
- Architectural style: Classical Revival
- MPS: Augusta Central Business District MRA
- NRHP reference No.: 86001690
- Added to NRHP: May 2, 1986

The D.V. Adams Co.-Bussell and Weston Building is a historic commercial building at 190 Water Street in downtown Augusta, Maine. Built in 1909, it is one of the state's best early examples of a department store building. The building was listed on the National Register of Historic Places in 1986.

== Description and history ==
The D.V.Adams Co.-Bussell and Weston Building is located on the west side of Water Street, Augusta's principal business thoroughfare, on the block south of Bridge Street. It is a three-story brick structure, with a flat roof adorned by an ornate projecting cornice. It is five bays wide, with the bays articulated by pilasters, and the first-floor display windows separated from the upper floors by a stylized entablature. The central bay is wider than the others, housing the recessed building entrance on the ground floor, and three-part windows on the upper floors with slender pilasters dividing the sections. The interior retains original decorative features, including iron columns, a wooden staircase, and pressed metal ceilings.

The building was designed by the Boston, Massachusetts firm of Freeman, Funk and Wilcox, and was built in 1909 for Bussell & Weston, a dry goods retailer. The building is a notable departure from the commercial Italianate architecture that predominates on Water Street. It originally had a stepped parapet, which was replaced c. 1919-1926 with the present Italianate cornice, bringing it more in sympathy with its neighbors. The building housed a department store until 1985.

== See also ==
- National Register of Historic Places listings in Kennebec County, Maine
