= North Monmouth Library =

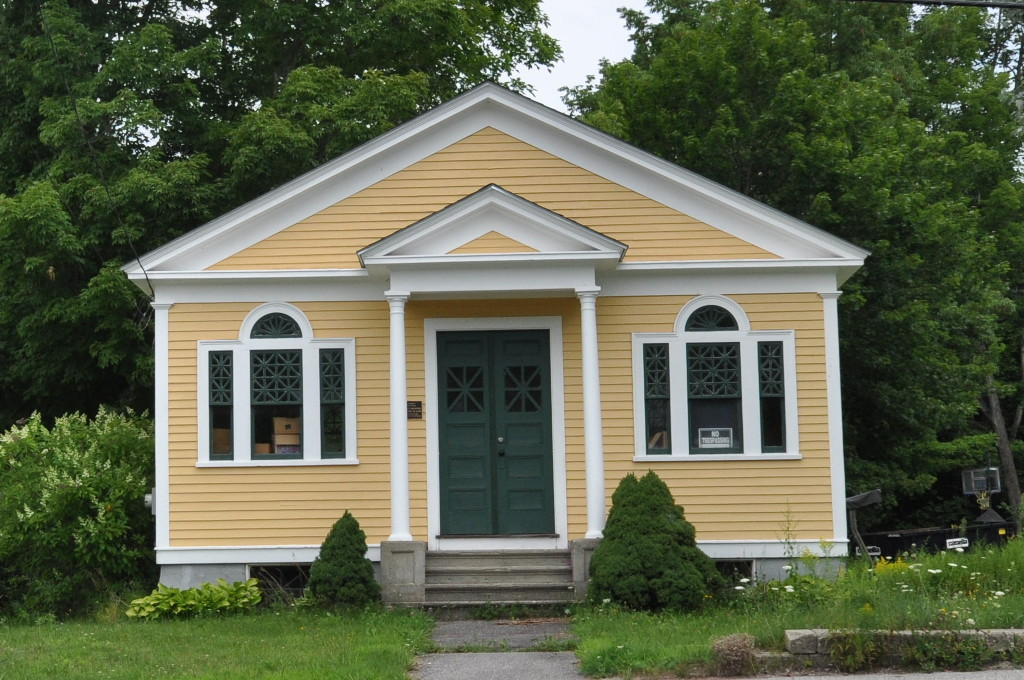
- Location: 132 N. Main St., Oakland, Maine, United States
- Type: Public
- Established: 1927

Other information
- Employees
- North Monmouth Public Library
- U.S. National Register of Historic Places
- Location within Maine Location within the United States
- Coordinates: 44°16′33″N 70°1′40″W
- Area: less than one acre
- Built: 1927
- Architect: Cochrane, Harry
- Architectural style: Colonial Revival
- NRHP reference No.: 100000807
- Added to NRHP: March 27, 2017

The North Monmouth Library is a small public library serving the village of North Monmouth in Monmouth, Maine. It is located at 132 North Main Street, in an architecturally distinguished Colonial Revival frame building designed by local architect Harry Cochrane and built in 1927. It has Palladian windows flanking its main entrance, which is sheltered by a gabled portico. The building was listed on the National Register of Historic Places in 2017.

== See also ==
- National Register of Historic Places listings in Kennebec County, Maine
