= Starling Grange =

- Starling Grange #156 (former)
- U.S. National Register of Historic Places
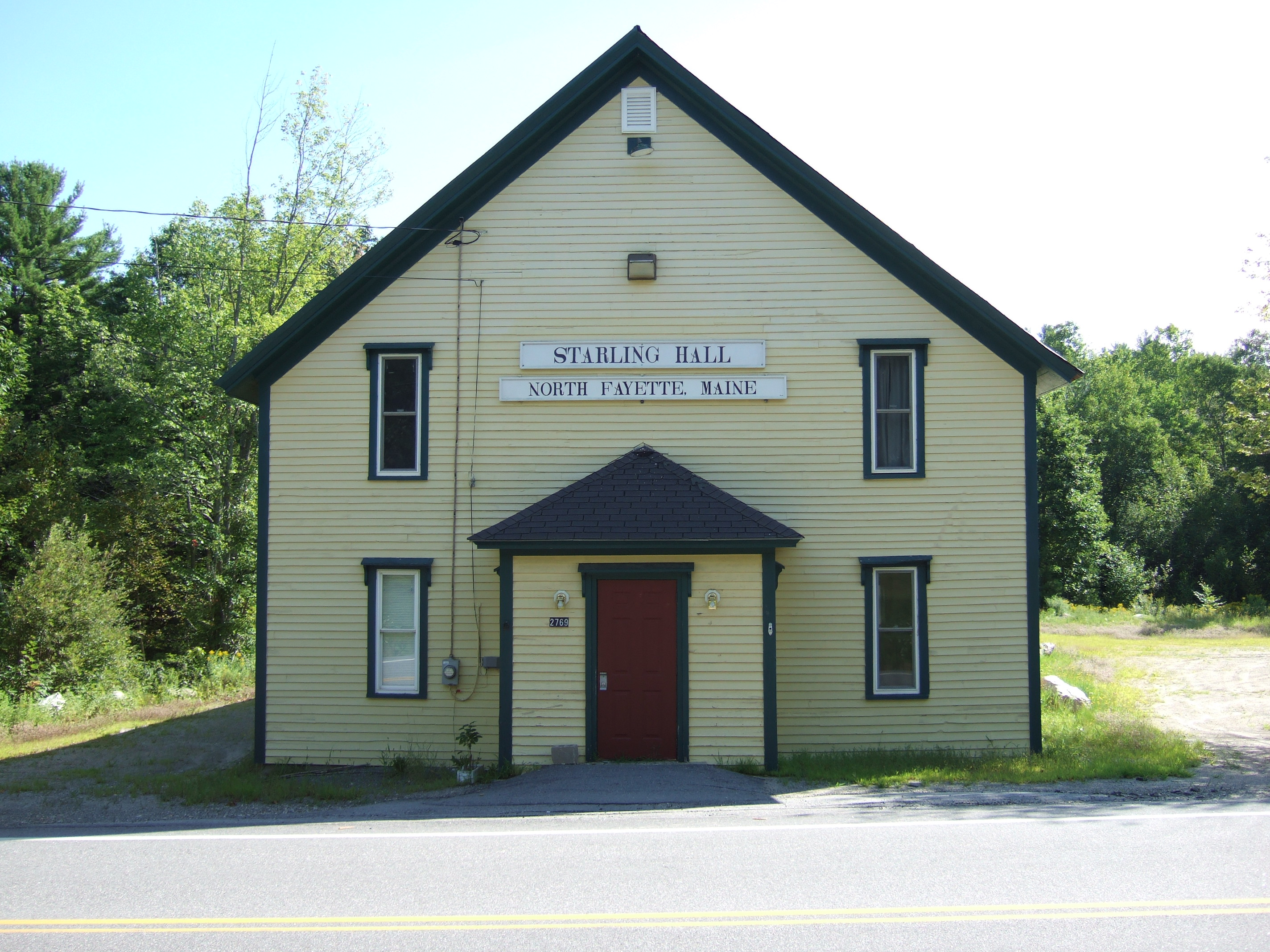

- Location within Maine Location within the United States
- Location: 2769 Main St. (ME 17), Fayette, Maine
- Coordinates: 44°26′58″N 70°4′7″W
- Area: 0.5 acres (0.20 ha)
- Built: 1877
- NRHP reference No.: 16000136
- Added to NRHP: April 5, 2016

The Starling Grange, now Starling Hall, is an historic former Grange hall at 2769 Main Street (ME 17) in Fayette, Maine, US. Built in 1879, it has been a fixture of the community since then. The Grange chapter disbanded in 1987, and the building has since then been owned by the town. It was listed on the National Register of Historic Places in 2016.

== Description and history ==
The former Starling Grange hall is located in the cluster buildings making up the village of North Fayette in north central Fayette. It is set on the east side of SR 17 just south of its junction with Baldwin Hill Road. It is a long rectangular 2-1/2 story wood frame structure, with a gabled roof and clapboarded exterior. It is set on a sloping lot, with its basement partially exposed. There is evidence that the basement was used for horse stalls. The front facade is symmetrical, with a projecting single-story entry vestibule topped by a hip roof. Sash windows are located on either side of the vestibule, and on the second floor, with decorative hoods. The ground floor interior is divided into a small meeting room, kitchen, and dining room, with a mudroom at the rear, while the upstairs is dominated by a large meeting hall with a raised stage and square proscenium.

The Starling Grange was organized in 1877, and the front portion of the present building was constructed in 1879. Due to large membership, the hall was enlarged in 1900 by widening and deepening; this alteration is visible in the post-and-beam framing of the original portion, and the balloon framing of the addition. The hall has served as a social and civic venue since its construction, and was adapted in 1953 to house the town library, which was established through the activities of the Grange chapter. The Grange was disbanded in 1987, and the building was deeded to the town. It has undergone rehabilitation, and is now maintained by a non-profit organization on behalf of the town.

== See also ==
- National Register of Historic Places listings in Kennebec County, Maine
