= Kresge Building (Augusta, Maine) =

- U.S. National Register of Historic Places
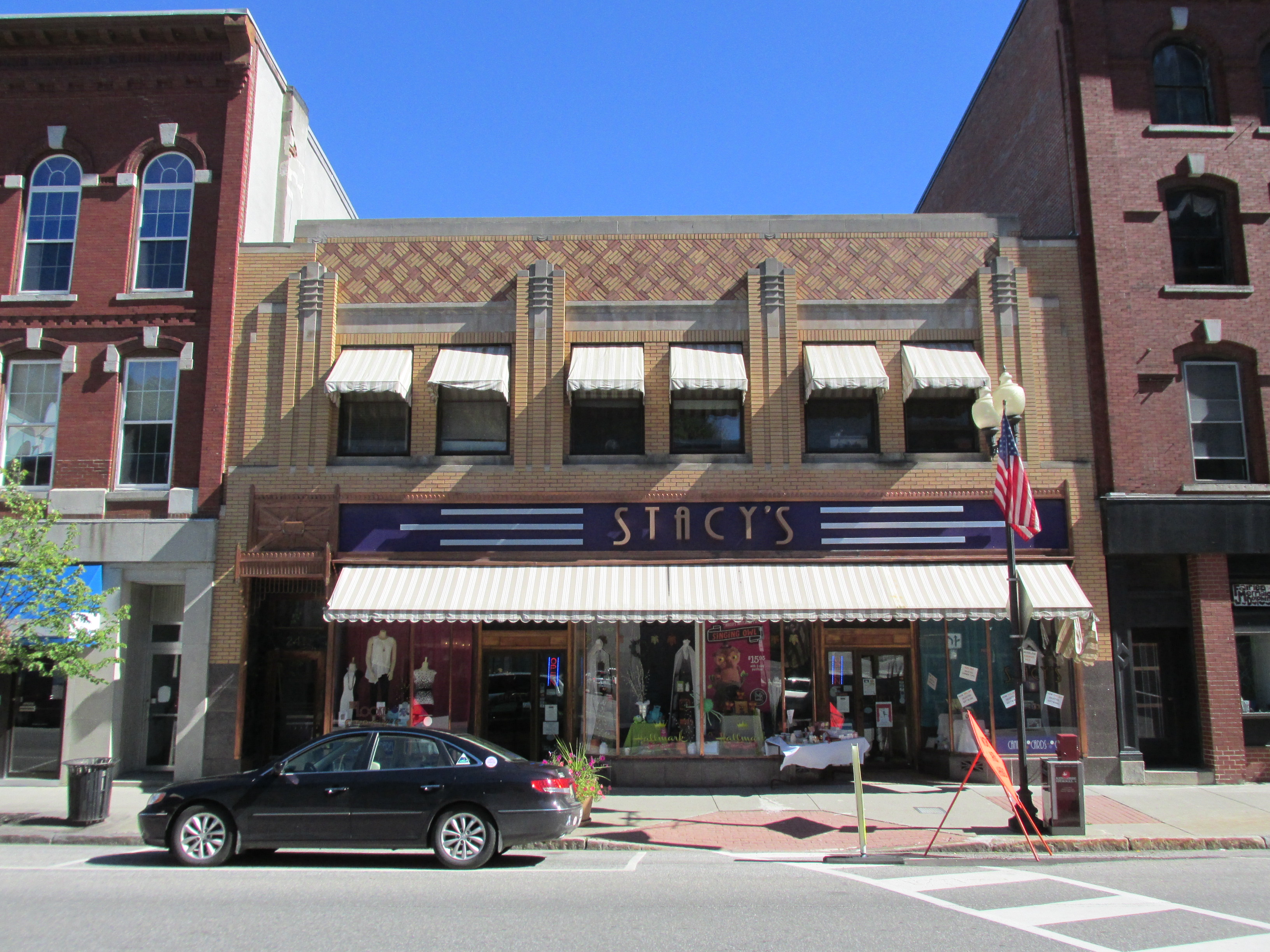

- Location within Maine Location within the United States
- Location: 241-249 Water St., Augusta, Maine
- Coordinates: 44°18′57″N 69°46′28″W
- Area: 1 acre (0.40 ha)
- Built: 1932
- Architectural style: Moderne
- MPS: Augusta Central Business District MRA
- NRHP reference No.: 86001693
- Added to NRHP: May 2, 1986

The Kresge Block is a historic commercial building at 241-249 Water Street in downtown Augusta, Maine. Built in 1932 to house a department store, it is a distinctive and rare local example of commercial Moderne architecture. It was listed on the National Register of Historic Places in 1986.

== Description and history ==
The Kresge Block is located on the east side of Water Street, Augusta's principal commercial thoroughfare, a bit south of the center of the block between Bridge and Front Streets. It is a two-story masonry structure, built out of brick and granite. The ground floor has two storefronts with a building entrance at the far left, sheltered by a decorative bronze hood. The lower half of the ground floor has polished granite below the glass display windows, and rising partway up the outer edge of the facade. The windows are framed by bronze trim, which also surrounds the store label above an awning sheltering the storefronts. The sign reads "Stacy's" using Art Deco styling. The second floor has paired sash windows, each with individual awnings, but shared stone sills and brick headers topped by a stone sill. The window pairs are separated by stylized pilasters. A parapet with a multicolor crosshatch brick pattern extends across the building above the second floor.

The block was built in 1932, replacing an Italianate building that was a virtual replica of its neighbors. It originally housed S.S. Kresge's, a department store, on the ground floor, with professional offices on the second floor. Since its construction, it has been one of downtown Augusta's most architecturally unusual buildings.

== See also ==
- National Register of Historic Places listings in Kennebec County, Maine
