= Elm Hill Farm =

- U.S. National Register of Historic Places
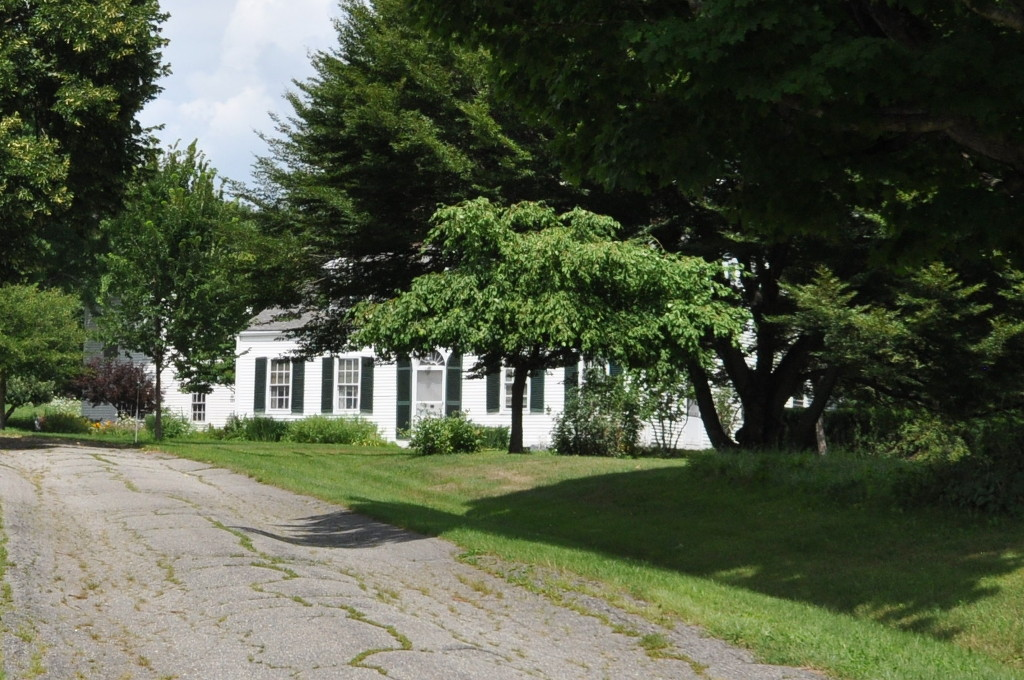

- Location within Maine Location within the United States
- Location: Litchfield Rd., Hallowell, Maine
- Coordinates: 44°16′48″N 69°47′57″W
- Area: 25 acres (10 ha)
- Built: 1799
- NRHP reference No.: 70000045
- Added to NRHP: August 25, 1970

Elm Hill Farm is a historic farm property on Litchfield Road in Hallowell, Maine. Its centerpiece is the Merrick Cottage, built in 1799 by one Hallowell's first colonial settlers, which is one of the oldest surviving buildings in the city. The property was listed on the National Register of Historic Places in 1970.

== Description and history ==
Elm Hill Farm is southwest of downtown Hallowell, on the north side of Litchfield Road, a secondary street leading west. It is set on a hill with views toward Vaughan Brook to the south and the Kennebec River to the east. The farm complex includes the main house, several barns, and a garage. The house is a roughly square 1-1/2 story wood frame structure, with a low-pitch gabled roof and original hand-split wooden clapboard siding. The roof is pierced by gabled dormers, which are a later addition. The interior of the house follows a central hall plan, with two rooms on either side of the center hall. Its main stairs are located off the dining room instead of in the main hall.

John Merrick first came to the Hallowell in 1794 as a tutor for the children of Dr. Benjamin Vaughan, one of the area's early settlers. In 1797 he married Vaughan's sister Susan in England, and returned with her to Maine. In 1799 he built this house. He was long active in local civic affairs, particularly education, serving as a trustee of the local academy, and as an overseer of Bowdoin College. The homestead was eventually sold out of the Merrick and Vaughan families, and was repurchased by a descendant in the 20th century.

== See also ==
- National Register of Historic Places listings in Kennebec County, Maine
