= Libby-Hill Block =

- U.S. National Register of Historic Places
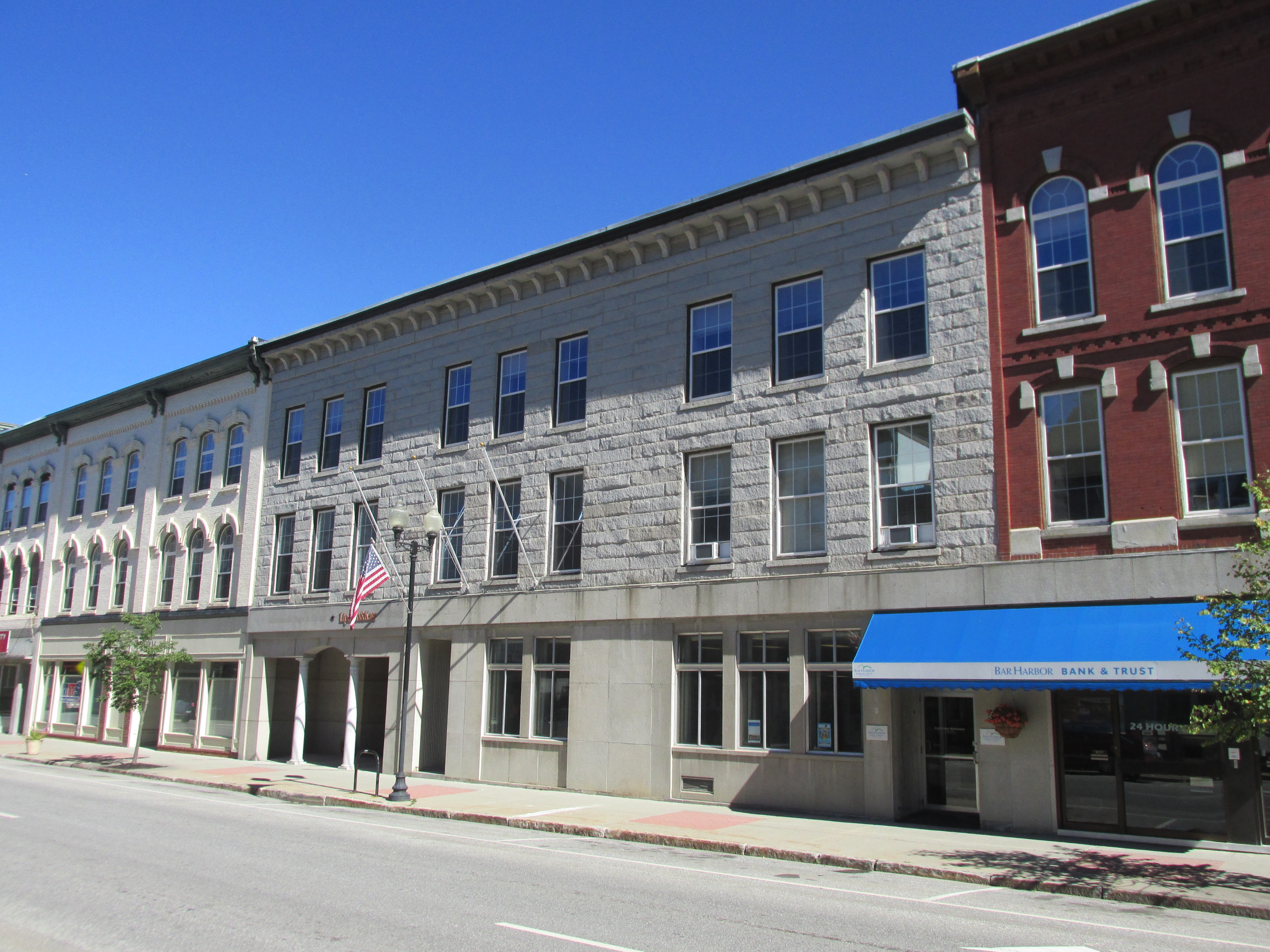

- Location within Maine Location within the United States
- Location: 227-233 Water St., Augusta, Maine
- Coordinates: 44°18′58″N 69°46′27″W
- Area: 0.3 acres (0.12 ha)
- Built: 1866
- Architectural style: Italianate
- MPS: Augusta Central Business District MRA
- NRHP reference No.: 86001694
- Added to NRHP: May 2, 1986

The Libby-Hill Block is a historic commercial building at 227-233 Water Street in downtown Augusta, Maine. Built in 1866 by two prominent businessmen after a fire destroyed part of the downtown, it is one of the city's oldest granite commercial buildings. It was listed on the National Register of Historic Places in 1986.

== Description and history ==
The Libby-Hill Block is located on the east side of Water Street, Augusta's principal commercial business district, roughly midway between Bridge and Winthrop Streets. It is a three-story masonry structure, built mainly out of rusticated granite blocks. It has a flat roof with a slightly projecting granite cornice, supported by granite brackets. The ground floor houses three storefronts, all of which have modernized facades of polished granite. The upper floors have sash windows set in unadorned rectangular openings.

Augusta's Water Street commercial district was devastated in 1865 by a massive fire. This building was built the following year, built by B. Libby and Dr. H.H. Hill, two of the city's wealthiest residents. Its granite construction is relatively rare for commercial buildings in the state. Its early tenants included a book store, barber, and dry goods store on the ground floor, and a dance studio and school in the upper floors.

== See also ==
- National Register of Historic Places listings in Kennebec County, Maine
