= Noble Block =

- U.S. National Register of Historic Places
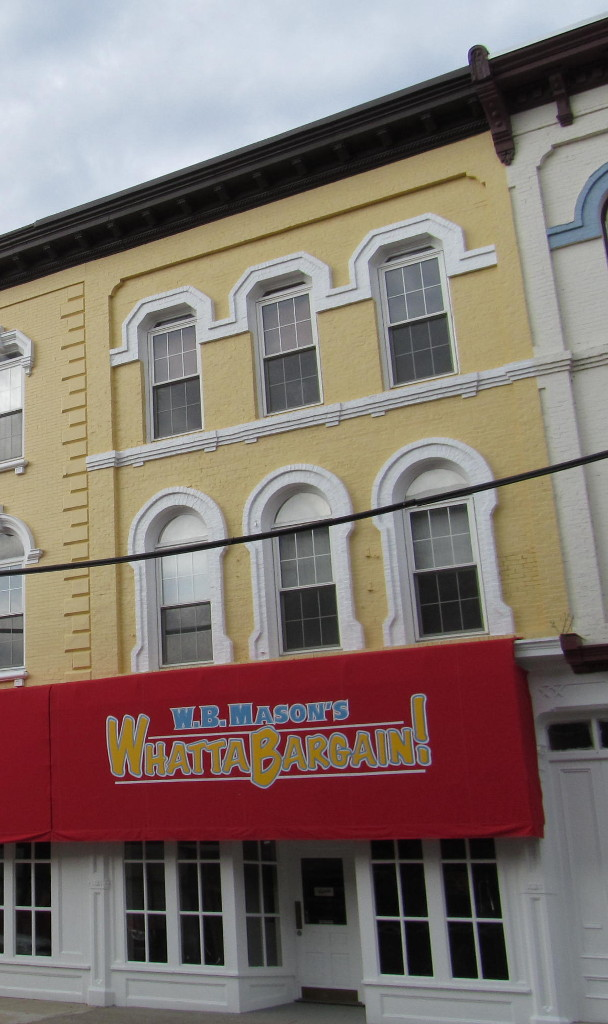

- Location within Maine Location within the United States
- Location: 186 Water St., Augusta, Maine
- Coordinates: 44°19′0″N 69°46′27″W
- Area: 0.3 acres (0.12 ha)
- Built: 1865
- Architect: John C. Tibbetts
- Architectural style: Italianate
- MPS: Augusta Central Business District MRA
- NRHP reference No.: 86001696
- Added to NRHP: May 2, 1986

The Noble Block is a historic commercial building at 186 Water Street in downtown Augusta, Maine. Built in 1867, it is one of a series of four Italianate commercial buildings built in the wake of a devastating 1865 fire. It was listed on the National Register of Historic Places in 1986.

== Description and history ==
The Noble Block stands on the west side of Water Street, Augusta's principal commercial downtown thoroughfare, just south of its junction with Bridge Street. It is the third of a series of four three-story brick Italianate commercial buildings, running south from that corner, which share a common roof line. Its ground floor has a single storefront, with multipane windows flanking a recessed entrance. At the outer ends are iron columns, rising to a modern awning that spans the adjacent building to the south. The upper floors are three bays wide, with rounded-arch openings housing sash windows on the second floor, and rectangular openings on the third. The third-floor windows have bracketed sills joined by brickwork, and also have joined decorative lintels. It shares a simple modillioned projecting cornice with the building to the south.

All four of these buildings were built beginning in 1865, after a fire devastated Augusta's downtown. This building was designed by John C. Tibbetts, Augusta's preeminent architect of the time, and was built for Thomas C. Noble. Its first floor was built in 1865, soon after the fire, and the upper floors were added in 1867. The building continues to see commercial use.

== See also ==
- National Register of Historic Places listings in Kennebec County, Maine
