= Maine State Route 225 =

State highway in central Maine, US

State Route 225

Route information
- Maintained by MaineDOT
- Length: 5.62 mi (9.04 km)
- Existed: 1932–present

Major junctions
- West end: SR 27 in Rome
- East end: SR 8 / SR 137 in Smithfield

Location
- Country: United States
- State: Maine
- Counties: Kennebec, Somerset

Highway system
- Maine State Highway System; Interstate; US; State; Auto trails; Lettered highways
| ← SR 224 | → SR 226 |

State Route 225 (SR 225) is a state highway located in central Maine on the border of Kennebec and Somerset counties. Running almost entirely in the town of Rome, the route begins at an intersection with SR 27. The easternmost section is within the town of Smithfield, with its eastern terminus located at SR8 and SR 137. SR 225 is locally named Rome Road for its entire 5.62-mile (9.04 km) length.

== Route description ==
SR 225 begins at SR 27 (Augusta Road) in Rome, and proceeds east into the town center, serving as its main road. The route continues due east, crossing into the town of Smithfield in Somerset County and ending at SR 8 / SR 137 (Village Road) south of town. For its entire length, SR 225 runs along the northern side of Great Pond, the largest great pond in Maine.

== History ==
SR 225 was designated in 1932 over entirely new routing. Its alignment has not changed since.

== Junction list ==
| County | Location | mi | km | Destinations | Notes |
|---|---|---|---|---|---|
| Kennebec | Rome | 0.00 | 0.00 | SR 27 (Augusta Road) – Belgrade, Augusta, Farmington | |
| Somerset | Smithfield | 5.62 | 9.04 | SR 8 / SR 137 (Village Road) – Smithfield, Oakland, Belgrade | |
1.000 mi = 1.609 km; 1.000 km = 0.621 mi
