= Rome, Maine =

Town in Maine, United States

- Town
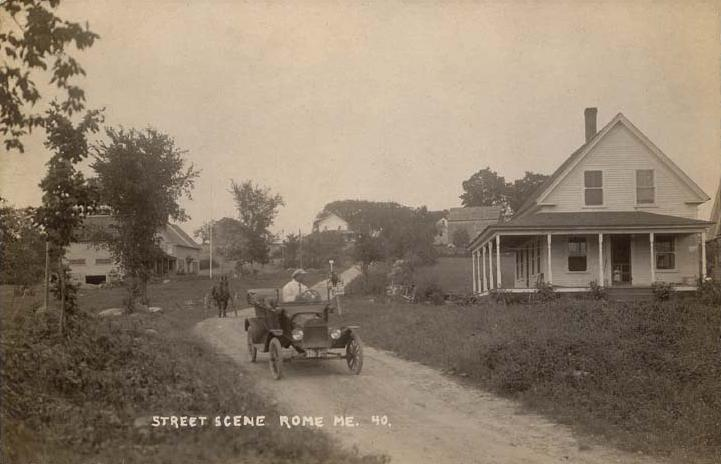
- Street scene, c. 1916

- Logo

- Location in Kennebec County and the state of Maine.
- Coordinates: 44°34′37″N 69°52′48″W
- Country: United States
- State: Maine
- County: Kennebec
- Incorporated: 1804; 222 years ago
- Villages: Rome; Belgrade Lakes (part)

Area
  - Total: 31.72 sq mi (82.15 km^{2})
  - Land: 25.41 sq mi (65.81 km^{2})
  - Water: 6.31 sq mi (16.34 km^{2})
- Elevation: 256 ft (78 m)

Population (2020)
  - Total: 1,148
  - Density: 45/sq mi (17.4/km^{2})
- Time zone: UTC-5 (Eastern (EST))
  - Summer (DST): UTC-4 (EDT)
- ZIP Code: 04963
- Area code: 207
- FIPS code: 23-63835
- GNIS feature ID: 582700
- Website: www.romemaine.com

Rome is a town in Kennebec County, Maine, United States. The population was 1,148 at the 2020 census. It is part of the Belgrade Lakes resort area, and is included in the Augusta, Maine, micropolitan New England City and Town Area.

== History ==
Originally a part of West Pond Plantation, Rome was first settled about 1780 by Richard Furbush from Lebanon. The town was incorporated on March 7, 1804, and named after Rome in Italy. Although farmers found the surface broken and uneven, the hills and valleys offered excellent grazing. By 1839, when the population was 1,074, it was described as "a beautiful farming town," with "a pleasant and flourishing village." In 1837, its wheat crop was 4,117 bushels.

The ponds abounded in trout, perch and pickerel. By 1859, Rome had one sawmill, one gristmill, and one shingle mill, although agriculture remained the principal occupation. By 1870, when the population was 725, it had two post offices: Rome and Belgrade Mills.

On April 4, 2013, 47-year-old Christopher Thomas Knight was arrested on suspicion of over a thousand burglaries. He was reported to have lived, on stolen supplies, in forests near Rome for 27 years with no intentional human contact.

== Geography ==
According to the United States Census Bureau, the town has a total area of 31.72 square miles (82.15 km^{2}), of which 25.41 square miles (65.81 km^{2}) is land and 6.31 square miles (16.34 km^{2}) is water. Rome includes the northern portions of Long Pond and Great Pond.

The town is serviced by state routes 8, 27, 137 and 225. It borders the towns of Vienna to the west, Mount Vernon to the west and south, Belgrade to the south and east, a portion of Smithfield to the northeast, Mercer to the north, and New Sharon to the northwest.

== Demographics ==
Historical population
| Census | Pop. | Note | %± |
|---|---|---|---|
| 1810 | 585 | | — |
| 1820 | 533 | | −8.9% |
| 1830 | 883 | | 65.7% |
| 1840 | 987 | | 11.8% |
| 1850 | 830 | | −15.9% |
| 1860 | 864 | | 4.1% |
| 1870 | 725 | | −16.1% |
| 1880 | 606 | | −16.4% |
| 1890 | 500 | | −17.5% |
| 1900 | 420 | | −16.0% |
| 1910 | 440 | | 4.8% |
| 1920 | 436 | | −0.9% |
| 1930 | 398 | | −8.7% |
| 1940 | 418 | | 5.0% |
| 1950 | 420 | | 0.5% |
| 1960 | 367 | | −12.6% |
| 1970 | 362 | | −1.4% |
| 1980 | 627 | | 73.2% |
| 1990 | 758 | | 20.9% |
| 2000 | 980 | | 29.3% |
| 2010 | 1,010 | | 3.1% |
| 2020 | 1,148 | | 13.7% |
U.S. Decennial Census

=== 2010 census ===
As of the census of 2010, there were 1,010 people, 439 households, and 299 families living in the town. The population density was 39.7 inhabitants per square mile (15.3/km^{2}). There were 1,038 housing units at an average density of 40.9 per square mile (15.8/km^{2}). The racial makeup of the town was 98.5% White, 0.2% African American, 0.4% Native American, 0.1% Asian, 0.7% from other races, and 0.1% from two or more races. Hispanic or Latino of any race were 0.6% of the population.

There were 439 households, of which 25.1% had children under the age of 18 living with them, 53.3% were married couples living together, 9.3% had a female householder with no husband present, 5.5% had a male householder with no wife present, and 31.9% were non-families. 24.1% of all households were made up of individuals, and 7.3% had someone living alone who was 65 years of age or older. The average household size was 2.30 and the average family size was 2.67.

The median age in the town was 46.2 years. 19.3% of residents were under the age of 18; 6.2% were between the ages of 18 and 24; 22.9% were from 25 to 44; 37.4% were from 45 to 64; and 14% were 65 years of age or older. The gender makeup of the town was 51.5% male and 48.5% female.

=== 2000 census ===
As of the census of 2000, there were 980 people, 386 households, and 289 families living in the town. The population density was 38.6 inhabitants per square mile (14.9/km^{2}). There were 941 housing units at an average density of 37.0 per square mile (14.3/km^{2}). The racial makeup of the town was 98.27% White, 0.10% African American, 0.82% Native American, 0.10% Asian, and 0.71% from two or more races. Hispanic or Latino of any race were 0.31% of the population.

There were 386 households, out of which 32.1% had children under the age of 18 living with them, 62.2% were married couples living together, 9.3% had a female householder with no husband present, and 24.9% were non-families. 17.9% of all households were made up of individuals, and 6.2% had someone living alone who was 65 years of age or older. The average household size was 2.54 and the average family size was 2.85.

In the town, the population was spread out, with 25.0% under the age of 18, 5.6% from 18 to 24, 29.5% from 25 to 44, 27.9% from 45 to 64, and 12.0% who were 65 years of age or older. The median age was 39 years. For every 100 females, there were 94.1 males. For every 100 females age 18 and over, there were 97.1 males.

The median income for a household in the town was $42,344, and the median income for a family was $46,635. Males had a median income of $32,153 versus $26,042 for females. The per capita income for the town was $21,355. About 7.0% of families and 11.0% of the population were below the poverty line, including 14.5% of those under age 18 and 13.3% of those age 65 or over.
