= Great Pond (disambiguation) =

Great Pond may refer to:

- Great pond (law), a legal term defining public waters in the United States

== Place names ==
- Frensham Great Pond, a pond on Frensham Common, Surrey, UK

In the United States

- Great Pond, a pond in the Belgrade Lakes area of Maine
- Great Pond, Maine, a town in Hancock County
- Great Pond (Massachusetts), a pond in Truro, Massachusetts
- Great Pond (New Hampshire), a lake in southern New Hampshire
- Great Pond (Saint Croix), a lagoon in the U.S. Virgin Islands
- Tisbury Great Pond, a salt pond on Martha's Vineyard, Massachusetts
