= Parker Pond (Maine) =

Lake in Kennebec County, Maine, United States

- Location within Maine Location within the United States
- Location: Kennebec County, Maine
- Coordinates: 44°29′24″N 70°01′41″W
- Basin countries: United States
- Surface area: 1,610 acres (650 ha)
- Max. depth: 76 ft (23 m)
- Water volume: 41,636 acre⋅ft (51,357,000 m^{3})
- Surface elevation: 358 ft (109 m)
- Islands: Birch Island, Causeway Island, Gooseneck Island, Spruce Island
- Settlements: Fayette and Vienna

Parker Pond is a pond located in the towns of Fayette, Mount Vernon, Chesterville, and Vienna, Maine. Relatively undeveloped, and one of the major bodies of water in the Winthrop Lakes Region, it is 76 feet (23 m) deep, and covers about 2.5 square miles (6 km^{2}) in surface area. Boat access is gained via an undeveloped launch at the north end. Bearnstow, a weekly summer camp, is located on its eastern shore.
