= Maine State Route 135 =

State highway in Kennebec County, Maine, US

State Route 135

Route information
- Maintained by MaineDOT
- Length: 23.41 mi (37.67 km)
- Existed: 1925–present

Major junctions
- South end: SR 132 in Monmouth
- US 202 / SR 11 / SR 100 in Winthrop; SR 17 in Readfield; SR 27 in Belgrade
- North end: SR 8 / SR 11 in Belgrade

Location
- Country: United States
- State: Maine
- Counties: Kennebec

Highway system
- Maine State Highway System; Interstate; US; State; Auto trails; Lettered highways
← SR 134	→ SR 136

State Route 135 (SR 135) is part of Maine's system of numbered state highways, located entirely within Kennebec County. It runs from SR 132 in Monmouth passing U.S. Route 202 (US 202) in Winthrop and ending at the intersection with SR 8 and SR 11 at Belgrade. The route is 23.4 miles (37.7 km) long.

== Junction list ==
The entire route is in Kennebec County.

Location	mi	km	Destinations	Notes
Monmouth	0.00	0.00	SR 132 (Main Street) – Sabattus, Winthrop	
Winthrop	9.67	15.56	US 202 east / SR 11 north / SR 100 north – Augusta	Southern end of US 202/SR 11/SR 100 concurrency
Winthrop	9.79	15.76	US 202 west / SR 11 south / SR 100 south – Winthrop	Northern end of US 202/SR 11/SR 100 concurrency
Readfield	12.95	20.84	SR 17 west (Main Street)	Southern end of SR 17 concurrency
Readfield	13.91	22.39	SR 17 east (Main Street)	Northern end of SR 17 concurrency
Belgrade	22.88	36.82	SR 27 (Augusta Road) – Belgrade Lakes, Augusta	
Belgrade	23.41	37.67	SR 8 / SR 11 (Oakland Road) – Oakland, Smithfield, Waterville	
1.000 mi = 1.609 km; 1.000 km = 0.621 mi: Concurrency terminus
