= Chandler Store =

Historic house in Maine, United States

- U.S. National Register of Historic Places
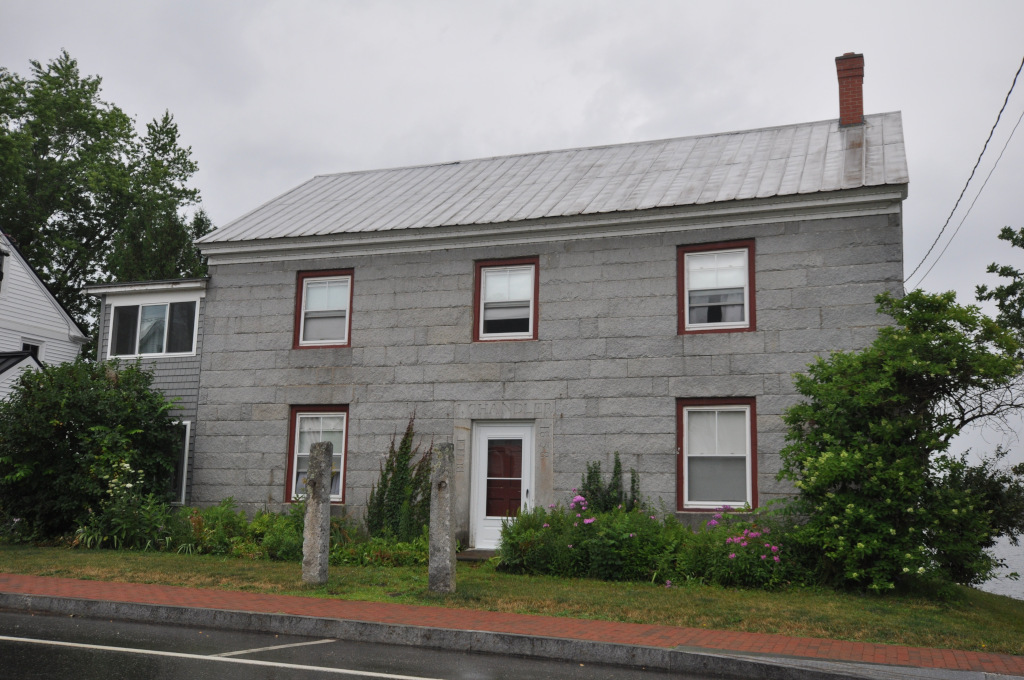

- Location within Maine Location within the United States
- Location: ME 27, Belgrade, Maine
- Coordinates: 44°31′41″N 69°53′19″W
- Area: 0.5 acres (0.20 ha)
- Built: 1838
- Built by: John Chandler
- Architectural style: Greek Revival
- NRHP reference No.: 85001263
- Added to NRHP: June 20, 1985

The Chandler Store is a historic formerly commercial building on Maine State Route 27 in the center of the Belgrade Lakes village of Belgrade, Maine. Built in 1838, it is one of only two known commercial buildings in the state to be built out of granite blocks. It is now a private residence. It was listed on the National Register of Historic Places in 1985.

== Description and history ==
The former Chandler Store building stands on the west side of SR 27, on land that fronts on Long Lake to the west. The building is a 2 1/2-story structure, built out of blocks of dressed granite, with a side-gable roof. The main facade is three bays wide, with the main entrance in the center bay, topped by a lintel in which "BUILT J. CHANDLER 1838" is incised. Sash windows occupy unadorned rectangular openings, as does the entrance. On the south (left) facade, a two-story wood frame porch is covered by a flat roof, with square posts as support.

The building was constructed in 1838 for J. Chandler by two Irish masons. Chandler supposedly hired the two men "for 50% and all the rum they could drink", to quarry the stone in nearby Vienna, and to build the structure. The stones were brought to the site by hauling them by sled across Long Pond when it was frozen in winter. In 1922 Charles R. Brown hired a mason to cut additional windows, and in 1927 added the porches as part of the building's residential conversion.

== See also ==
- National Register of Historic Places listings in Kennebec County, Maine
