= Maine State Route 226 =

State highway in Kennebec County, Maine, US

State Route 226

Route information
- Maintained by MaineDOT
- Length: 5.50 mi (8.85 km)
- Existed: 1934–present

Major junctions
- South end: SR 27 / SR 126 in Randolph
- North end: SR 17 in Chelsea

Location
- Country: United States
- State: Maine
- Counties: Kennebec

Highway system
- Maine State Highway System; Interstate; US; State; Auto trails; Lettered highways
← SR 225	→ SR 227

State Route 226 (SR 226) is a state highway located in southern Kennebec County, Maine. It begins at SR 27 and SR 126 in Randolph and runs 5.50 miles (8.85 km) northeast to SR 17 in Chelsea. SR 226 directly connects the two towns and functions as part of a bypass of Augusta to and from points east. The route is locally known as Windsor Street in Randolph and Togus Road in Chelsea.

== Route description ==
SR 226 begins at SR 27 / SR 126 (Water Street) in downtown Randolph on the eastern bank of the Kennebec River, 0.2 miles (0.32 km) south of the Pearl Harbor Remembrance Bridge connecting to the city of Gardiner across the river. The route heads northeast out of Randolph as Windsor Street and crosses into the town of Chelsea as Togus Road. SR 226 passes through the town center and terminates at SR 17 (Eastern Avenue).

== History ==
SR 226 was designated in 1934 to serve what is now Togus VA Medical Center. It was first signed the following year. It was designated over entirely new routing and its alignment has not changed since.

== Junction list ==
The entire route is in Kennebec County.

Location	mi	km	Destinations	Notes
Randolph	0.00	0.00	SR 27 / SR 126 (Water Street) to I-95 / I-295 – Wiscasset, Gardiner, Augusta	
Chelsea	5.50	8.85	SR 17 (Eastern Avenue) – Augusta, Rockland	
1.000 mi = 1.609 km; 1.000 km = 0.621 mi
