= Echo Lake (Maine) =

- Crotched Pond
- Location within Maine Location within the United States
- Location: Kennebec County, Maine
- Coordinates: 44.438°N 70.024°W
- Type: Reservoir
- Basin countries: United States
- Surface area: 1,185 acres (480 ha)
- Max. depth: 117 ft (36 m)
- Water volume: 23,134 acre⋅ft (28,535,000 m^{3})
- Surface elevation: 325 ft (99 m)
- Islands: Echo Island, Turtle Island
- Settlements: Fayette, Mount Vernon, Readfield

Echo Lake, also known as Crotched Pond, is a lake located in the towns of Fayette, Mount Vernon and Readfield, Maine. It is 117 feet (36 m) deep, and covers about 1.9 square miles (5 km^{2}) in surface area. One of the major bodies of water in the Winthrop Lakes Region, the lake is known for its rocky shores, scenery, deep cool water, and naturally reproducing lake trout population. A public boat launch is located on the north shore in Mount Vernon off State Route #41.

Camp Winnebago, a summer camp for boys, is located on the southwest shore of Echo Lake.
