= Maine State Route 238 =

State highway in Lincoln County, Maine, US

State Route 238
- Cape Newagen Road

Route information
- Maintained by MaineDOT
- Length: 3.73 mi (6.00 km)
- Existed: 1975–present

Major junctions
- South end: SR 27 in Southport
- North end: SR 27 in Southport

Location
- Country: United States
- State: Maine
- Counties: Lincoln

Highway system
- Maine State Highway System; Interstate; US; State; Auto trails; Lettered highways
← SR 237	→ I-295

State Route 238 (SR 238) is a state highway located on Southport Island in south central Maine. It runs entirely within the town of Southport and intersects with SR 27 at both ends. SR 238 traverses the eastern edge of Southport Island, serving as an alternate to SR 27 which runs roughly parallel on the western side of the island. It is locally named Cape Newagen Road over its entire 3.73-mile (6.00 km) length.

== Route description ==
SR 238 begins at an intersection between SR 27 (Hendricks Hill Road), Town Landing Road, and Cape Newagen Road (which carries SR 238) near the southern tip of Southport Island. This intersection is also the southern terminus of SR 27. Heading southbound on SR 27, the road bends to the left and becomes SR 238 north, and vice versa. From this intersection, SR 238 proceeds almost directly north, running along the eastern side of the island. North Cross Road, about two-thirds of the way north, provides a direct connection between SR 27 and SR 238. SR 238 continues north to terminate at SR 27, which leaves the island and crosses into Boothbay Harbor to the northeast.

== History ==
Designated in 1975, SR 238 was the newest route in Maine's highway system until the designation of SR 26A in 2006. It is the highest-numbered signed route in Maine that is not an Interstate highway.

== Major junctions ==
The entire route is in Southport, Lincoln County.

mi	km	Destinations	Notes
0.00	0.00	SR 27 north (Hendricks Hill Road) – Southport	Southern terminus of SR 27
3.73	6.00	SR 27 (Hendricks Hill Road) – Boothbay Harbor, Wiscasset	
1.000 mi = 1.609 km; 1.000 km = 0.621 mi
