= Maine State Route 27 =

State highway in Maine, US

State Route 27
- Route of SR 27 highlighted in red

Route information
- Maintained by MaineDOT
- Length: 154.10 mi (248.00 km)
- Existed: c. 1933–present

Major junctions
- South end: SR 238 in Southport
- US 1 in Wiscasset; US 201 / SR 9 in Gardiner; US 201 / US 202 / SR 11 in Augusta; I-95 in Augusta; SR 3 in Augusta; US 2 in New Sharon; US 2 / SR 4 in Farmington
- North end: R-161 at the Canadian border in Coburn Gore

Location
- Country: United States
- State: Maine
- Counties: Lincoln, Kennebec, Franklin, Somerset

Highway system
- Maine State Highway System; Interstate; US; State; Auto trails; Lettered highways
← SR 26	→ SR 32

State Route 27 (abbreviated SR 27) is part of Maine's system of numbered state highways, running 154.1 miles (248.0 km) from the village of Newagen in Southport at SR 238 to the Coburn Gore–Woburn Border Crossing, where it continues into Quebec as Route 161.

SR 27 passes through the major cities, towns, and villages of Boothbay Harbor, Wiscasset, Gardiner, Augusta, the Belgrade Lakes Region, Farmington, Kingfield, and Eustis.

== Route description ==
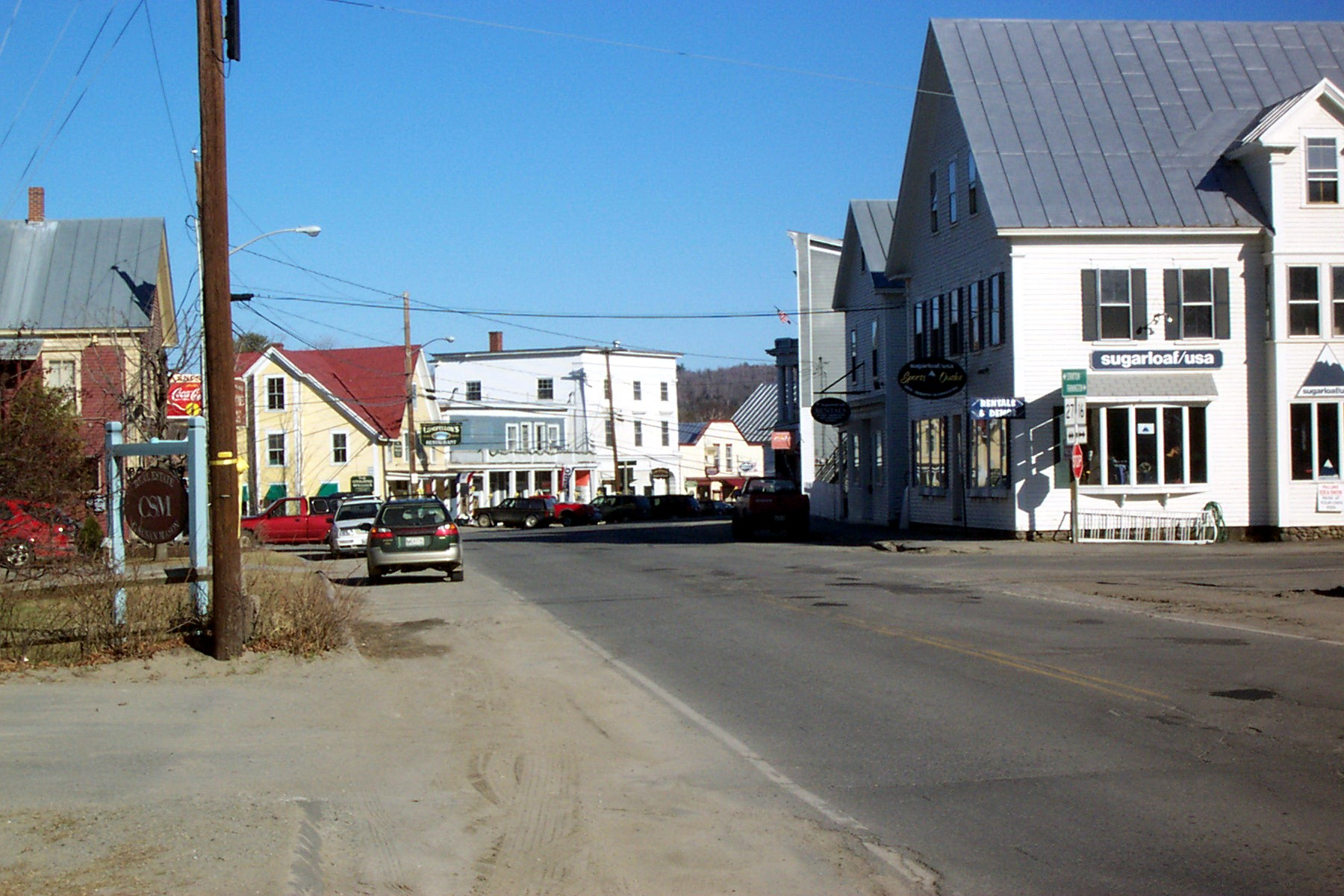
SR 27 through downtown Kingfield

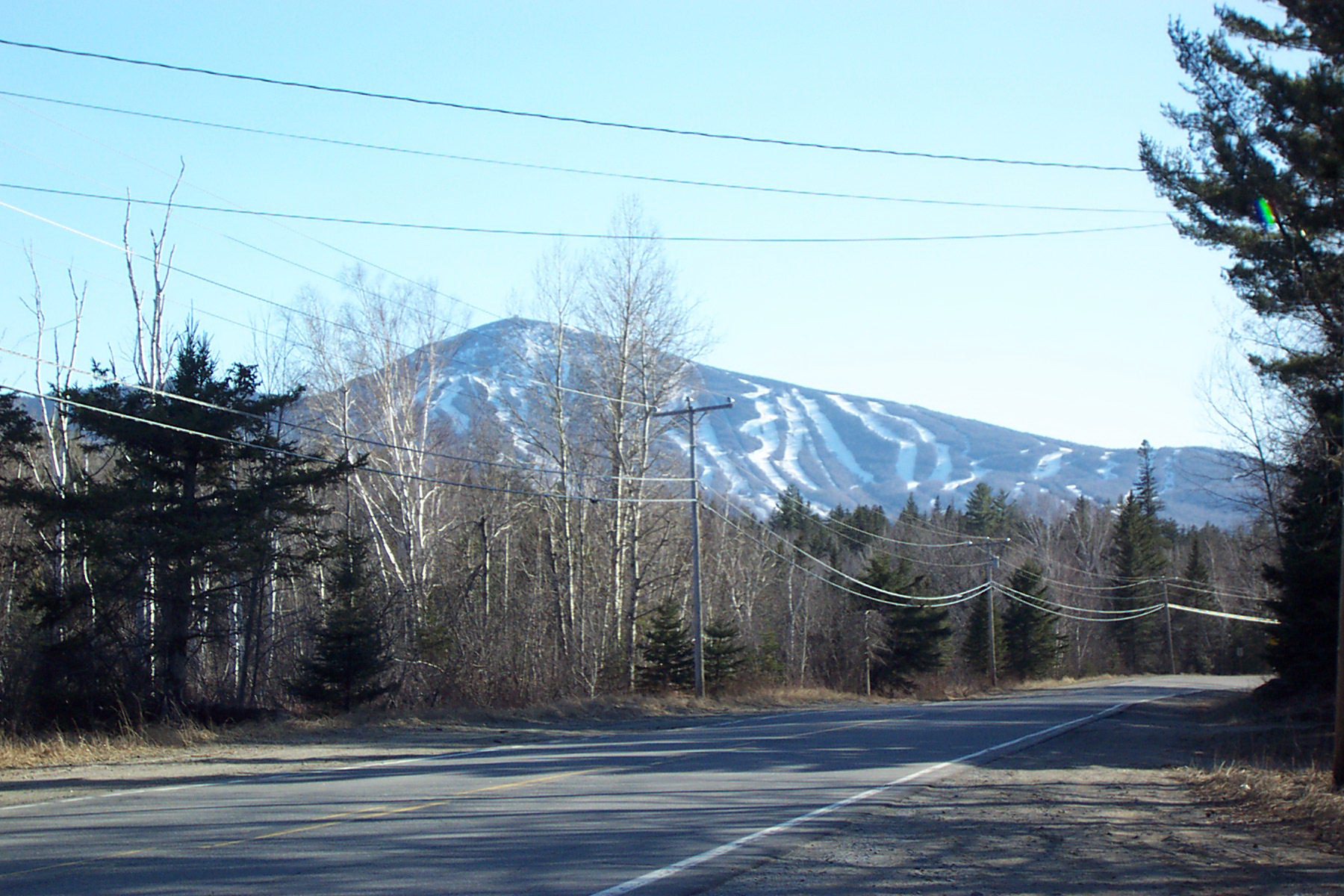
Sugarloaf USA seen from SR 27 (and SR 16) in Carrabassett Valley

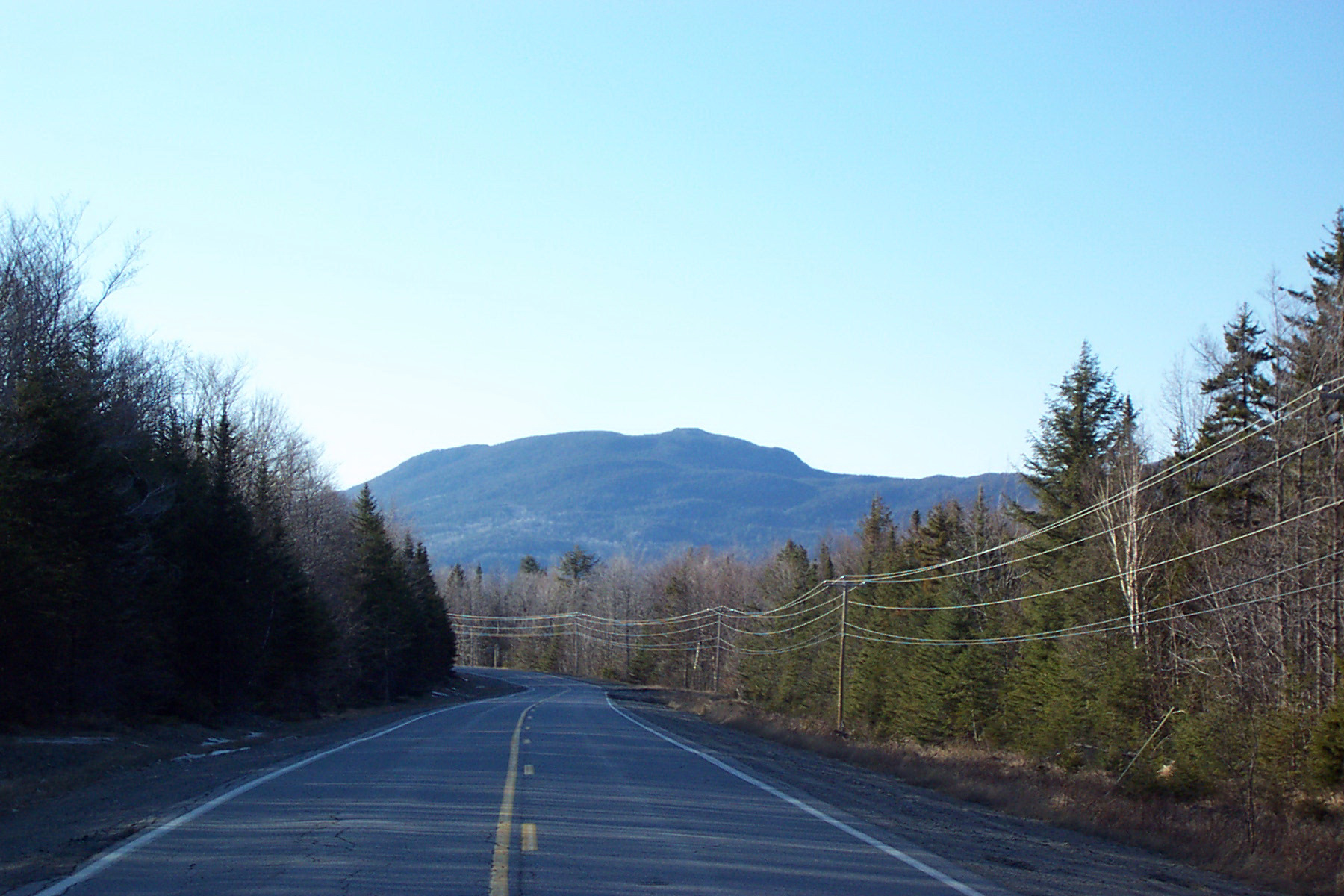
Cranberry Peak of Bigelow Mountain seen from SR 27 (and SR 16) facing northbound in Carrabassett Valley

SR 27 begins at SR 238 in Southport and heads northeast to the town of Boothbay Harbor. It intersects SR 96, then heads north to the town of Edgecomb to US 1, where it turns left along US 1 heading into the town of Wiscasset. It intersects SR 218, and then immediately turns right and continues north to Dresden, where it intersects SR 197. SR 27 continues north to Pittston where it intersects State Route 194 and State Route 126. SR 27 continues into Randolph where it intersects SR 226 and then turns west as SR 9 continues north to Augusta.

In Augusta, SR 27 intersects SR 24 and US 201, then intersects US 202, SR 11, SR 17 and SR 100 at a rotary. Continuing north, SR 27 leaves US 201 and turns northwest toward Belgrade. It intersects SR 105 and SR 104 before heading towards I-95 along with SR 8 and SR 11. In North Augusta, the highway intersects SR 3 and, in Sidney, intersects SR23. In Belgrade, SR 8 and SR 11 split off and SR 27 intersects SR 135 before passing through Belgrade Lakes Village.

In Rome, SR 27 intersects SR 225. It then joins US 2, enters the town of New Sharon, and intersects SR 134. In Farmington Falls, it intersects SR 41, which heads south. SR 27 then turns onto SR 4 and SR 43. The three routes then turn east toward Industry. SR 27 splits off and heads north into New Vineyard. SR 27 then joins SR 234 before entering New Portland. It then intersects SR 146 and heads north to Kingfield. It intersects SR 142 and joins SR 16. The two routes enter Carrabassett Valley, where they pass Sugarloaf Mountain. The routes then enter Stratton, where SR 16 forks to the west towards Rangeley, leaving SR 27 to head north to Eustis. The highway curves to the northeast to Coburn Gore where it crosses the border into Quebec, continuing as Quebec Route 161.

== Major intersections ==
County	Location	mi	km	Destinations	Notes
Lincoln	Southport	0.0	0.0	SR 238 north	South end of SR 27 and SR 238
Lincoln	Southport	4.9	7.9	SR 238 south	North end of SR 238
Lincoln	Boothbay Harbor	7.6	12.2	SR 96 east – East Boothbay, Ocean Point	West end of SR 96
Lincoln	Edgecomb	18.4	29.6	US 1 north – Rockland	South end of overlap with US 1
Lincoln	Sheepscot River	19.6	31.5	Donald E. Davey Bridge	
Lincoln	Wiscasset	20.0	32.2	SR 218 north	South end of SR 218
Lincoln	Wiscasset	20.3	32.7	US 1 south – Bath	North end of overlap with US 1
Lincoln	Dresden	28.1	45.2	SR 127 south / SR 197 west – Richmond	North end of SR 127, east end of SR 197
Lincoln	Dresden	29.6	47.6	SR 128 south – Woolwich	North end of SR 128
Kennebec	Pittston	36.0	57.9	SR 194 east – East Pittston	West end of SR 194
Kennebec	Pittston	36.4	58.6	SR 126 east – North Whitefield	South end of overlap with SR 126
Kennebec	Randolph	37.1	59.7	SR 226 east – Togus USVA, Chelsea	West end of SR 226
Kennebec	Randolph	37.3	60.0	SR 9 east	South end of overlap with SR 9
Kennebec	Kennebec River	37.4	60.2	Pearl Harbor Remembrance Bridge	
Kennebec	Gardiner	37.5	60.4	US 201 south / SR 9 west / SR 24 south / SR 126 west – Gardiner, Richmond	North end of overlap with SR 9 and SR 126, south end of overlap with US 201, north end of SR 24
Kennebec	Augusta	43.4	69.8	US 201 north / US 202 / SR 11 south / SR 17 / SR 100 – Waterville, Winthrop	Roundabout; north end of overlap with US 201, south end of overlap with SR 8 and SR 11, south end of SR 8
Kennebec	Augusta	44.1	71.0	SR 104 north – Sidney	South end of SR 104
Kennebec	Augusta	46.4	74.7	I-95 – Waterville, Portland	Exit 112 on I-95
Kennebec	Augusta	48.2	77.6	SR 3 east – Belfast	West end of SR 3
Kennebec	Sidney	50.0	80.5	SR 23 north – Oakland	South end of SR 23
Kennebec	Belgrade	55.2	88.8	SR 8 north / SR 11 north – Oakland	North end of overlap with SR 8 and SR 11
Kennebec	Belgrade	55.6	89.5	SR 135 – Oakland, Readfield	
Kennebec	Rome	63.7	102.5	SR 225 east – Rome, Oakland	West end of SR 225
Franklin	New Sharon	70.6	113.6	US 2 east – Skowhegan	South end of overlap with US 2
Franklin	New Sharon	71.2	114.6	SR 134 south – Mount Vernon	South end of overlap with SR 134
Franklin	New Sharon	71.3	114.7	Sandy River bridge	
Franklin	New Sharon	71.4	114.9	SR 134 north – Starks	North end of overlap with SR 134
Franklin	Farmington	75.8	122.0	SR 41 south / SR 156 west – Mount Vernon, Farmington Falls	North end of SR 41, east end of SR 156
Franklin	Farmington	80.2	129.1	US 2 west / SR 4 south / SR 43 west – Wilton, Rumford	North end of overlap with US 2, south end of overlap with SR 4 and SR 43
Franklin	Farmington	80.8	130.0	SR 43 east – Madison	North end of overlap with SR 43
Franklin	Farmington	83.3	134.1	SR 4 north – Strong, Rangeley	North end of overlap with SR 4
Franklin	New Vineyard	90.8	146.1	SR 234 west – Strong	South end of overlap with SR 234
Franklin	New Vineyard	92.8	149.3	SR 234 east – North Anson	North end of overlap with SR 234
Somerset	New Portland	97.0	156.1	SR 146 east – New Portland, North Anson	West end of SR 146
Franklin	Kingfield	102.9	165.6	SR 16 east – North New Portland	South end of overlap with SR 16
Franklin	Kingfield	102.9	165.6	SR 142 south – Phillips	North end of SR 142
Franklin	Eustis	126.0	202.8	SR 16 west – Rangeley	North end of overlap with SR 16
Franklin	Coburn Gore	154.1	248.0	Canada–United States border at Coburn Gore–Woburn Border Crossing	
Franklin	Coburn Gore	154.1	248.0	R-161 north – Woburn	Continuation into Quebec
1.000 mi = 1.609 km; 1.000 km = 0.621 mi: Concurrency terminus
