= Boothbay Harbor (CDP), Maine =

Boothbay Harbor, Maine
- Census-designated place
- Location in Lincoln County and the state of Maine
- Coordinates: 43°51′19″N 69°37′35″W
- Country: United States
- State: Maine
- County: Lincoln
- Town: Boothbay Harbor

Area
  - Total: 0.85 sq mi (2.20 km^{2})
  - Land: 0.85 sq mi (2.20 km^{2})
  - Water: 0 sq mi (0.00 km^{2})
- Elevation: 59 ft (18 m)

Population (2020)
  - Total: 872
  - Density: 1,028.7/sq mi (397.18/km^{2})
- Time zone: UTC-5 (Eastern (EST))
  - Summer (DST): UTC-4 (EDT)
- ZIP Code: 04538
- Area code: 207
- FIPS code: 23-06085
- GNIS feature ID: 2377891
- Website: boothbayharbor.org

Boothbay Harbor is a census-designated place (CDP) comprising the densely populated center of the town of Boothbay Harbor in Lincoln County, Maine, United States. The population was 1,086 at the 2010 census, down from 1,237 at the 2000 census.

== Geography ==
The Boothbay Harbor CDP is located in the east-central part of the town of Boothbay Harbor in southwestern Lincoln County. The CDP is bordered to the south by the water body of Boothbay Harbor, an inlet off the Gulf of Maine, and to the southwest by Mill Cove, an arm of Boothbay Harbor. To the northwest the CDP is bordered by the inlet stream of Mill Cove, running northeast to Maine State Route 27. To the northeast, the CDP is bordered by Maine State Route 96 (Ocean Point Road) and to the east it extends to Meadow Brook. Lobster Cove Road forms the southeasternmost extent of the CDP. Via Route 27, Boothbay Harbor is 13 miles (21 km) south of Wiscasset.

According to the United States Census Bureau, the CDP has a total area of 0.85 square miles (2.2 km^{2}), all land.

== Demographics ==
Historical population
Census	Pop.	Note	%±
2020	872		—
U.S. Decennial Census

As of the 2000 census, there were 1,237 people, 586 households, and 309 families residing in the CDP. The population density was 1,432.0 inhabitants per square mile (552.9/km^{2}). There were 800 housing units at an average density of 926.1 per square mile (357.6/km^{2}). The racial makeup of the CDP was 97.49% White, 0.16% Black or African American, 0.57% Native American, 0.81% Asian, 0.49% from other races, and 0.49% from two or more races. Hispanic or Latino of any race were 0.57% of the population.

There were 586 households, out of which 21.7% had children under the age of 18 living with them, 41.8% were married couples living together, 9.0% had a female householder with no husband present, and 47.1% were non-families. 39.4% of all households were made up of individuals, and 20.0% had someone living alone who was 65 years of age or older. The average household size was 2.04 and the average family size was 2.74.

In the CDP, the population was spread out, with 17.5% under the age of 18, 6.5% from 18 to 24, 24.3% from 25 to 44, 26.6% from 45 to 64, and 25.0% who were 65 years of age or older. The median age was 46 years. For every 100 females, there were 82.4 males. For every 100 females age 18 and over, there were 79.3 males.

The median income for a household in the CDP was $31,201, and the median income for a family was $38,125. Males had a median income of $27,000 versus $15,658 for females. The per capita income for the CDP was $18,133. About 8.5% of families and 13.7% of the population were below the poverty line, including 22.4% of those under age 18 and 10.6% of those age 65 or over.
