= Belgrade Lakes =

Group of lakes in Kennebec County, Maine, United States

East Pond
- Location within Maine
- Location: Maine
- Coordinates: 44°38′N 69°47′W
- Max. length: 2.9 mi (4.7 km)
- Surface area: 1,717 acres (695 ha)
- Max. depth: 27 feet (8.2 m)
- Water volume: 27,307 acre⋅ft (33,683,000 m^{3})
- Surface elevation: 263 ft (80 m)

North Pond
- Location within Maine
- Location: Maine
- Coordinates: 44°38′N 69°51′W
- Max. length: 3 mi (4.8 km)
- Surface area: 2,531 acres (1,024 ha)
- Max. depth: 20 feet (6.1 m)
- Water volume: 1,662 acre⋅ft (2,050,000 m^{3})
- Surface elevation: 253 ft (77 m)

Long Pond
- Location within Maine
- Location: Kennebec County
- Coordinates: 44°32′N 69°54′W
- Max. length: 7.2 mi (11.6 km)
- Surface area: 2,557 acres (1,035 ha)
- Max. depth: 106 ft (32 m)
- Water volume: 73,165 acre⋅ft (90,248,000 m^{3})
- Surface elevation: 237 ft (72 m)

The Belgrade Lakes are a chain of lakes around Belgrade, Maine. The flow sequence is from East Pond to North Pond to Great Pond to Long Pond to Messalonskee Lake and thence via Messalonskee Stream to the Kennebec River at Waterville. The lakes have long been an important resort area for fishing, boating, and swimming; and shoreline development includes residences for individuals employed in the cities of Waterville and Augusta.

== East Pond ==
East Pond is the headwater pond of the Belgrade chain of lakes. The south end of the pond is in Oakland, and the north end of the pond in Smithfield. The outlet stream is the Serpentine which is approximately 2.5 miles (4.0 km) long ending at the Coffin Dam. The outlet of the dam passes through the village of Smithfield and into the east side of North Pond. In 2018 the East Pond Association worked with the State of Maine to perform an Alum treatment. The goal of this treatment was to trap the phosphorus at the bottom of the lake as it is a major cause of the Algal blooms seen starting in the 1990s. Since the treatment, water clarity has been excellent.

== North Pond ==
Weedy North Pond covers the boundary of Smithfield to the east, Mercer to the northwest, and Rome to the southwest. It is the shallowest lake of the chain. North Pond tributaries include Sucker Brook and Clark Brook joining the overflow from East Pond, and Leech Brook, Bog Brook and Pattee Brook flowing into the north end of the pond. There is a public boat launch area near the outlet of Bog Brook. The south end of North Pond overflows through Great Meadow Stream, which forms the eastern border of Rome and western border of Oakland and Belgrade for approximately 2 miles (3.2 km) before reaching the northwestern bay of Great Pond.

== Great Pond ==
At 8,239 acres (3,334 ha), Great Pond is the largest of the Belgrade Lakes and forms the boundary between Rome to the north and Belgrade to the south. Tributaries Rome Trout Brook and Robbins Mill Stream enter the north end of Great Pond. Great Pond overflows westward approximately 1 kilometre (1,100 yd) to the east side of Long Pond north of the narrows. Although Great Pond is more than twice as deep as the previous lakes in the chain, it similarly becomes uniformly warm through the summer and unsuitable for native trout or salmon.

== Long Pond ==
The northern basin of Long Pond in Rome is of similar depth as Great Pond, but the basin forming the western boundary of Belgrade and eastern boundary of Mount Vernon south of the narrows is fifty percent deeper with cooler deep waters. There is a public boat launch area at the south end of the narrows. Tributaries Whittier Brook and Beaver Brook drain Whittier Pond, Beaver Pond, Watson Pond, Round Pond, Kidder Pond, and McIntire Pond into the northern basin of Long Pond. Stony Brook and Ingham Stream drain Moose Pond and Ingham Pond into the southern basin. Smaller tributaries like Graveyard Brook and Sandy Cove Stream drain the eastern shores of the southern basin. The south end of Long Pond overflows through Belgrade Stream and Wings Mills Dam, reaching the south end of Messalonskee Lake after flowing 9 miles (14 km) eastward.

== Messalonskee Lake ==
Messalonskee Lake is the deepest at 113 feet (34 m), and second largest of the Belgrade Lakes with similar cold water habitat to the south basin of Long Pond. The north end of Messalonskee Lake overflows through Messalonskee Stream 10 miles (16 km) to the Kennebec River.

== Smaller ponds ==
The 486-acre (197 ha) McGrath Pond and 562-acre (227 ha) Salmon Lake overflow into the east side of Great Pond. They have extensive shoreline development and are sometimes called the sixth and seventh Belgrade Lakes.

== Ecology ==
The lakes provide suitable habitat for chain pickerel, white perch, smallmouth bass and largemouth bass. Early angling focused on brook trout from the tributary brooks and Atlantic salmon in the deeper lakes; but tributaries lack sufficient spawning and nursery habitat to replace angling success. Attempts to sustain the salmon population by stocking hatchery fish caused dramatic decline in the late 1970s of the population of rainbow smelt which had been the primary prey of native salmon. Stocking then introduced brown trout with greater tolerance for warm water lake conditions. Local interests seeking alternative angling opportunities illegally introduced northern pike and black crappie. Eutrofication from residential development of the shoreline has reduced Secchi disk depth to 4 meters, and dead algae has reduced oxygen levels in deep water.
