= Bearnstow =

- Spruce Point Camps
- U.S. National Register of Historic Places
- U.S. Historic district
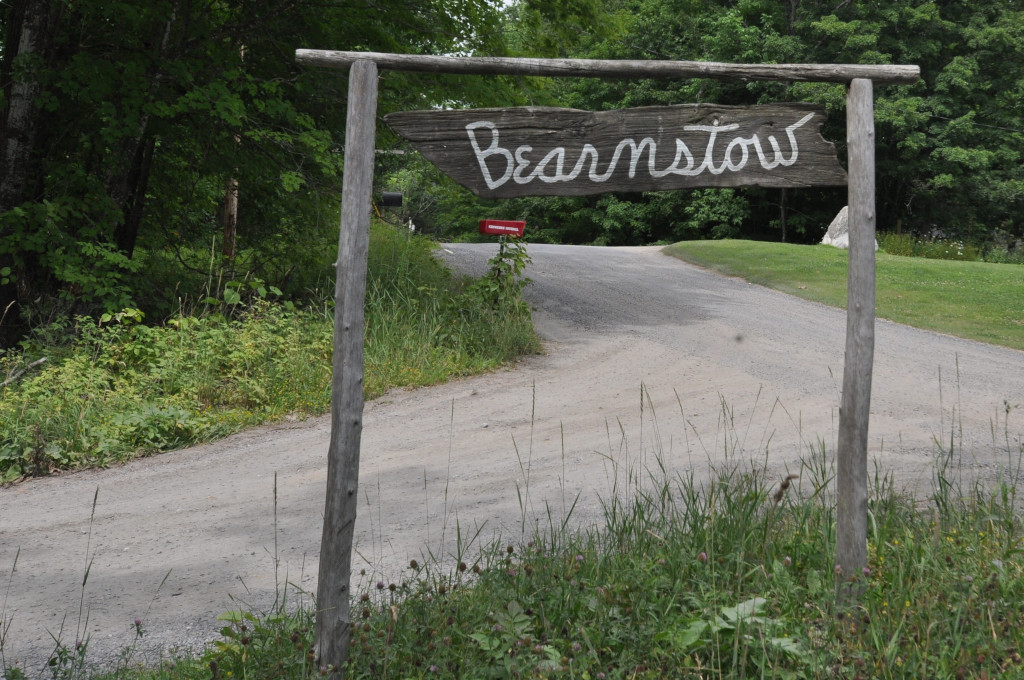

- Location within Maine Location within the United States
- Location: 84 Bearnstow Rd., Mount Vernon, Maine
- Coordinates: 44°29′56″N 70°0′51″W
- Area: 14.8 acres (6.0 ha)
- Built: 1915
- Built by: Stevens, Charles E.
- NRHP reference No.: 07000011
- Added to NRHP: February 7, 2007

Bearnstow is a summer camp on Parker Pond in Mount Vernon, Maine. The camp offers weeklong and day programs for adults and children, with an emphasis on appreciation of nature through the arts and sciences. Founded in 1946, the camp occupies 65 acres (26 ha) on the east side of the pond, and is centered on the former Spruce Point Camps, whose facilities, built in the 1920s and 1930s, are listed on the National Register of Historic Places.

== Setting ==
Bearnstow occupies 65 acres of mostly wooded landscape between Ithiel Gordon Road and the eastern shore of Parker Pond in westernmost Mount Vernon. The centerpiece of the camp is a 12-acre (4.9 ha), where most of its infrastructure is located. Its facilities include a main lodge and dining hall near one another and the lakeshore, with camp cabins sprinkled through the woods along the shore to the north and south. Near the central facilities are rock ledges facing the water, and there is a beach further south. A small outdoor performance space is located inland near the main parking area.

== History ==
The core property was first developed as a private summer retreat around the turn of the 20th century, with the building that is now the main lodge already standing when the property was sold in 1906. It was developed as a summer sporting camp in the mid-1910s, with the construction of four cabins just south of the lodge. By 1922 additional cabins had been built, and the dining hall was also added about 1922. Later facilities include an employee cabin, wood shed, and toolhouse (by 1938) and the stable (1956). The outdoor performance space is an adaptive reuse of a level area that previously served as a tennis court.

The camp was opened in 1915 as a fishing camp by Charles Stevens, a carpenter from Fayette. He sold the property in 1922 to Webster Chester, a professor at Colby College, who operated the camp until 1938. It closed in 1940 for the duration of World War II, and was reopened under new ownership as Bearnstow in 1945.

== See also ==
- National Register of Historic Places listings in Kennebec County, Maine
