= Wiscasset (disambiguation) =

Wiscasset, Maine is a town in the United States.

Wiscasset may also refer to:

- Wiscasset (CDP), Maine, a census-designated place; the town center
- Wiscasset, Waterville and Farmington Railway
