= Joseph Allen (Maine politician) =

American politician

Joseph W. Allen (1862 - March 16, 1930) was an American businessperson and politician from Maine. He co-owned Allen Brothers, a general store in Mount Vernon.

A Republican, Allen served six years in the Maine Legislature between 1907 and 1916. Allen served one term in the Maine House of Representatives (1907–1908) and two terms in the Maine Senate (1913–1916). In the Senate, he was elected from the seventh senatorial district, which included Kennebec County, Maine.

Born in New Sharon, Maine, Allen spent most of his life in Mount Vernon. He was a longtime member of the Shriners, a Masonic society as well as the Independent Order of Odd Fellows. He belonged to the Kora Temple in Lewiston.
