= Maine State Route 132 =

North-south state highway in Maine, US

State Route 132

Route information
- Maintained by MaineDOT
- Length: 10.88 mi (17.51 km)
- Existed: 1937–present

Major junctions
- South end: SR 9 / SR 126 in Sabattus
- SR 135 in Monmouth
- North end: US 202 / SR 11 / SR 100 in Monmouth

Location
- Country: United States
- State: Maine
- Counties: Androscoggin, Kennebec

Highway system
- Maine State Highway System; Interstate; US; State; Auto trails; Lettered highways
← SR 131	→ SR 133

State Route 132 (SR 132) is part of Maine's system of numbered state highways, located in Androscoggin and Kennebec counties. The route runs from SR 9 and SR 126 in Sabattus to US 202, SR 11, and SR 100 in northern Monmouth.

== Route description ==
SR 132 begins at the intersection with SR 9 and SR 126 in Sabattus. The route heads north towards Wales. After passing Wales, the road continues heading north towards the southern terminus of SR 135 at Monmouth. SR 132 continues heading north towards its northern terminus at US 202, SR 11, and SR 100 in northern Monmouth.

== Junction list ==
County	Location	mi	km	Destinations	Notes
Androscoggin	Sabattus	0.00	0.00	SR 9 / SR 126 – Litchfield, Lewiston	
Kennebec	Monmouth	8.76	14.10	SR 135 north – E. Monmouth	Southern terminus of SR 135
Kennebec	Monmouth	10.88	17.51	US 202 / SR 11 / SR 100 – Lewiston, Winthrop, North Monmouth	
1.000 mi = 1.609 km; 1.000 km = 0.621 mi
