= Pearl Harbor Memorial Bridge =

The Pearl Harbor Memorial Bridge is the name of several bridges in the United States:

- Pearl Harbor Memorial Bridge (Connecticut), over the Quinnipiac River
- Pearl Harbor Remembrance Bridge (Maine), over the Kennebec River, sometimes referred to as the Memorial Bridge
- Pearl Harbor Memorial Bridge (Maryland), over the Severn River
- Pearl Harbor Memorial Bridge (Pennsylvania), over the Schuylkill River

== See also ==
- Pearl Harbor Memorial Highway, several roads
- Delaware Memorial Bridge
