= Maine School Administrative District 11 =

School district in Kennebec County, Maine, United States

Address
- 150 Highland Avenue Gardiner, Maine, 04345; United States
- Coordinates: 44.2326°N 69.7821°W

District information
- Grades: PreK–12
- NCES District ID: 2310590

Students and staff
- Students: 1,946
- Teachers: 159.69
- Staff: 260.2
- Student–teacher ratio: 12.19

Other information
- Website: www.msad11.org

Maine School Administrative District 11 (MSAD 11) serves the communities of Gardiner, Pittston, Randolph and West Gardiner, in the U.S. state of Maine.

== Schools ==
- Gardiner Area High School
- Gardiner Regional Middle School
- Helen Thompson School
- Laura E. Richards School
- Pittston-Randolph Consolidated School
- River View Community School
