= Belgrade, Maine =

Town in Maine, United States

- Town
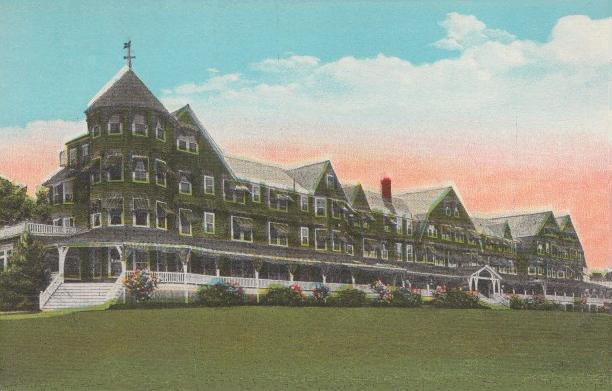
- The Belgrade Hotel, c. 1920

- Seal
- Motto: "A Bedroom Community"
- Location in Kennebec County and the state of Maine
- Coordinates: 44°29′35″N 69°51′15″W
- Country: United States
- State: Maine
- County: Kennebec
- Incorporated: 1796
- Villages: Belgrade; Belgrade Lakes; North Belgrade

Area
  - Total: 57.93 sq mi (150.04 km^{2})
  - Land: 43.24 sq mi (111.99 km^{2})
  - Water: 14.69 sq mi (38.05 km^{2})
- Elevation: 246 ft (75 m)

Population (2020)
  - Total: 3,250
  - Density: 29/sq mi (11/km^{2})
- Time zone: UTC-5 (Eastern (EST))
  - Summer (DST): UTC-4 (EDT)
- ZIP Codes: 04917 (Belgrade); 04918 (Belgrade Lakes)
- Area code: 207
- FIPS code: 23-04020
- GNIS feature ID: 582348
- Website: www.belgrademaine.gov

Belgrade is a town in Kennebec County, Maine, United States. Its population was 3,250 at the 2020 census. However, its population approximately doubles during the summer months as part-year residents return to seasonal camps on the shores of Great Pond, Long Pond and Messalonskee Lake. Belgrade includes the villages of North Belgrade, Belgrade Depot and Belgrade Lakes (or The Village). It is included in the Augusta, Maine micropolitan New England City and Town Area.

== History ==
The land was originally owned by the Plymouth Company, from which inhabitants obtained their titles. Called Washington Plantation, it was first settled in 1774 by Philip Snow from New Hampshire. On February 3, 1796, it was incorporated as Belgrade, named after Belgrade, Serbia. The surface of the town is uneven, much of it covered by water in the form of a connected chain of lakes. The largest lake is Great Pond, which dominates the town. Agriculture became the chief occupation of the inhabitants, with potatoes the principal crop.

Outlets of the ponds provided water power for mills. In 1859, there was a shovel factory and spool factory, as well as several sawmills and gristmills. By 1886, there were also factories that made rakes, shingles, excelsior, scythes and boxes. With the arrival of the railroad, Belgrade developed into a tourist resort of fishing, boating and lakeside cottages. The Belgrade Hotel, designed by noted Portland architect John Calvin Stevens, was built at Belgrade Lakes. The town was an annual summertime destination for the writers E.B. White and Ernest Thompson. The latter's sojourns at Great Pond inspired his 1979 play On Golden Pond, which was made into the Academy Award-winning 1981 movie, On Golden Pond. Belgrade Lake is central to the short story Once More to the Lake by E.B.White. In 1998, a semi-private golf course named Belgrade Lakes Golf Club was opened, which was named to the Golf Digest top 100 list for greatest public courses.

== Geography ==
According to the United States Census Bureau, the town has a total area of 57.93 square miles (150.04 km^{2}), of which 43.24 square miles (111.99 km^{2}) is land and 14.69 square miles (38.05 km^{2}) is water. Belgrade is drained by the Belgrade Stream.

The town is crossed by 11, 27, 135 and 225. It borders the towns of Smithfield to the northeast, Oakland and Sidney to the east, Manchester and Readfield to the south, Mount Vernon to the southwest, and Rome to the northwest.

== Demographics ==
Historical population
Census	Pop.	Note	%±
1800	295		—
1810	996		237.6%
1820	1,121		12.6%
1830	1,375		22.7%
1840	1,748		27.1%
1850	1,722		−1.5%
1860	1,592		−7.5%
1870	1,485		−6.7%
1880	1,321		−11.0%
1890	1,090		−17.5%
1900	1,058		−2.9%
1910	1,037		−2.0%
1920	957		−7.7%
1930	978		2.2%
1940	1,046		7.0%
1950	1,099		5.1%
1960	1,102		0.3%
1970	1,302		18.1%
1980	2,043		56.9%
1990	2,375		16.3%
2000	2,978		25.4%
2010	3,189		7.1%
2020	3,250		1.9%
U.S. Decennial Census

=== 2010 census ===
As of the census of 2010, there were 3,189 people, 1,265 households, and 935 families living in the town. The population density was 73.8 inhabitants per square mile (28.5/km^{2}). There were 2,198 housing units at an average density of 50.8 per square mile (19.6/km^{2}). 933 of the housing units, or 42.4%, were vacant as of Census Day (April 1), 818 of which were used for seasonal or vacation purposes. The racial makeup of the town was 98.3% White, 0.2% African American, 0.1% Native American, 0.1% Asian, and 1.3% from two or more races. Hispanic or Latino of any race were 0.5% of the population.

There were 1,265 households, of which 33.4% had children under the age of 18 living with them, 60.8% were married couples living together, 9.0% had a female householder with no husband present, 4.1% had a male householder with no wife present, and 26.1% were non-families. 19.6% of all households were made up of individuals, and 9.1% had someone living alone who was 65 years of age or older. The average household size was 2.51 and the average family size was 2.85.

The median age in the town was 43.8 years. 22.7% of residents were under the age of 18; 6% were between the ages of 18 and 24; 23.2% were from 25 to 44; 33.5% were from 45 to 64; and 14.6% were 65 years of age or older. The gender makeup of the town was 49.5% male and 50.5% female.

=== 2000 census ===
As of the census of 2000, there were 2,978 people, 1,178 households, and 876 families living in the town. The population density was 68.9 inhabitants per square mile (26.6/km^{2}). There were 2,007 housing units at an average density of 46.4 per square mile (17.9/km^{2}). The racial makeup of the town was 98.69% White, 0.10% African American, 0.10% Native American, 0.20% Asian, 0.13% Pacific Islander, 0.03% from other races, and 0.74% from two or more races. Hispanic or Latino of any race were 0.47% of the population.

There were 1,178 households, out of which 34.8% had children under the age of 18 living with them, 62.7% were married couples living together, 8.2% had a female householder with no husband present, and 25.6% were non-families. 18.9% of all households were made up of individuals, and 6.5% had someone living alone who was 65 years of age or older. The average household size was 2.52 and the average family size was 2.89.

In the town, the population was spread out, with 25.3% under the age of 18, 5.7% from 18 to 24, 30.0% from 25 to 44, 27.5% from 45 to 64, and 11.5% who were 65 years of age or older. The median age was 40 years. For every 100 females, there were 93.0 males. For every 100 females age 18 and over, there were 91.6 males.

The median income for a household in the town was $39,053, and the median income for a family was $42,321. Males had a median income of $32,226 versus $24,962 for females. The per capita income for the town was $20,407. About 8.4% of families and 9.6% of the population were below the poverty line, including 11.3% of those under age 18 and 9.8% of those age 65 or over.

== Economy ==
Belgrade is largely a commuter town and relies on tourism in the summer.

== Notable people ==
- Harold Alfond, shoe manufacturer and philanthropist, had a summer cabin in Belgrade
- Joseph Force Crater, New York judge who disappeared under suspicious circumstances; had a summer cabin in Belgrade
- Nick Mayo, professional basketball player, grew up in Belgrade
- Anson P. Morrill, congressman, 24th governor of Maine
- Lot M. Morrill, U.S. Secretary of the Treasury, U.S. senator, 28th governor of Maine
- Daniel J. Newman, state legislator
- Wyatt Omsberg, soccer player
- Olin Sewall Pettingill Jr, naturalist, author and filmmaker
- John Franklin Spalding, Episcopal Bishop of Colorado
- Greenlief T. Stevens, military officer
