= Pearl Harbor Memorial Highway =

Pearl Harbor Memorial Highway may refer to:

- Pearl Harbor Memorial Highway, designated along Interstate 10 in the rural areas of California, Arizona, New Mexico and Florida
- Pearl Harbor Memorial Expressway, designated along US Highway 169 through Tulsa, Oklahoma
- Pearl Harbor/USS Oklahoma Memorial Highway, designated along State Highway 77H in Norman, Moore, and Oklahoma City, Oklahoma
- Pearl Harbor Memorial Highway, part of Interstate 69 running through Shiawassee County, Michigan
- Pearl Harbor Memorial Highway, Interstate 65 through Johnson County, Indiana

== See also ==
- Pearl Harbor Memorial Turnpike Extension in New Jersey
- the West Shore Expressway in New York, ceremonially designated the Pearl Harbor Memorial Expressway by Gov. George Pataki.
- Pearl Harbor Memorial Bridge (disambiguation)
