= Maine State Route 96 =

State highway in Lincoln County, Maine, US

State Route 96

Route information
- Maintained by MaineDOT
- Length: 5.73 mi (9.22 km)
- Existed: 1948–present

Major junctions
- West end: SR 27 in Boothbay Harbor
- East end: Middle Road in Boothbay

Location
- Country: United States
- State: Maine
- Counties: Lincoln

Highway system
- Maine State Highway System; Interstate; US; State; Auto trails; Lettered highways
| ← SR 95 | → SR 97 |

State Route 96 (SR 96) is a short state highway on the eastern coast of Maine. It runs for 5.73 miles (9.22 km), serving Ocean Point in the village of East Boothbay, located on the Linekin peninsula. It connects to SR 27 in Boothbay on the mainland. It is one of several coastal routes which "dead-end" at or near the Atlantic coastline.

SR 96 has the shape of an inverted uppercase "L" and is signed east–west. However, the majority of the highway's length in Linekin runs nearly due north and south.

== Route description ==
SR 96 begins in the west at SR 27 just north of the town center of Boothbay Harbor. SR 27 is the only major road connecting from this area to the rest of the state and is additionally signed as "TO U.S. ROUTE 1," despite that US 1 connects to SR 27 over ten miles (16 km) to the north.

The first mile (1.6 km) of SR 96 runs directly on the town line between Boothbay and Boothbay Harbor, before completely passing into Boothbay. SR 96 turns due south (signed east) onto the Linekin peninsula and passes through the village of East Boothbay, along Linekin Bay. The SR 96 designation continues as far south as Middle Road, where the main highway splits into local roads servicing Ocean Point directly.

SR 96 is named Ocean Point Road for its entire length, although the road does continue south into Ocean Point as an unnumbered local road.

== Junction list ==
The entire route is in Lincoln County.

| Location | mi | km | Destinations | Notes |
|---|---|---|---|---|
| Boothbay Harbor | 0.00 | 0.00 | SR 27 (Townsend Avenue) – Southport, Wiscasset | |
| Boothbay | 5.73 | 9.22 | Middle Road | |
1.000 mi = 1.609 km; 1.000 km = 0.621 mi
