= FirstPark =

Business park in Oakland, Maine, United States

Coordinates: 44.548°N 69.684°W

FirstPark is a 285 acres (115 ha; 1 km^{2}; 0 sq mi) business park in Oakland, Maine. Operated by the Kennebec Regional Development Authority, the commerce and technology center is located along the I-95 corridor. FirstPark's executive director is Kristine Logan.

== History ==
The Maine Legislature established FirstPark as a project of the Kennebec Regional Development Authority in 1997, and FirstPark opened in 1998. Twenty-four towns comprise the Kennebec Regional Development Authority, with the towns helping to fund business operations at the business park in return for a share of the park's generated tax revenue. FirstPark paid off its bond debt in 2020 and became debt-free.

In 2020, FirstPark made four commercial real estate sales, the most since 1999. FirstPark tenants include Maine Eye Doctors, Maine Medical Partners, One River CPAs, Waterville Community Dental Center, and a T-Mobile call center which employs hundreds of workers.

Logan says FirstPark is a "regional asset that brings multiple communities together around a shared economic goal." The park is in a foreign-trade zone, where companies can engage in commerce without formally entering it into U.S. Customs territory.

== Leadership ==
In January 2026, Logan became executive director of FirstPark, replacing Jim Dinkle. She was previously executive director of the Midcoast Regional Redevelopment Authority, overseeing the transformation of the former Naval Air Station Brunswick.

Dinkle first joined FirstPark in 2017, and is credited for guiding the park through a period of steady growth. Seven lots in the park were sold under his leadership.
