= Great Pond (Massachusetts) =

Natural kettle pond in Truro, Barnstable County

Great Pond, Truro
- Location within Massachusetts Location within the United States
- Location: Truro, Barnstable County, Massachusetts
- Coordinates: 41.9746°N 70.0299°W
- Type: kettle pond
- Average depth: 14 feet (4.3 m)
- Max. depth: 35 feet (11 m)

Great Pond (Truro) is one of three ponds in Barnstable County that share the name. The others are located in Eastham and Provincetown. Great Pond in Truro is 17-acre natural kettle pond with an average depth of 14 feet (4.3 m) and a maximum depth of 35 feet (11 m). Transparency is very good, extending to 14 feet (4.3 m), and aquatic vegetation is scarce. The bottom is composed primarily of sand. The shoreline is lightly developed with residential homes.

Great Pond is located just east of Route 6 within the Cape Cod National Seashore. Access is through an unmarked dirt road off Route 6, 0.7 miles (1.1 km) north of the Truro/Wellfleet line just beyond Savage Rd. Anglers must park along the shoulder of Route 6 and walk in. A steep dirt path leads to a shallow cove at the eastern end of the pond. Access is suitable only for wading anglers, canoes and lightweight cartop boats.

Great Pond is generally quite acidic. It has been limed in the past. The state used to stock the pond with smallmouth bass and trout, but was not stocking it in 2018.
