= Readfield, Maine =

Town in Maine, United States

- Town
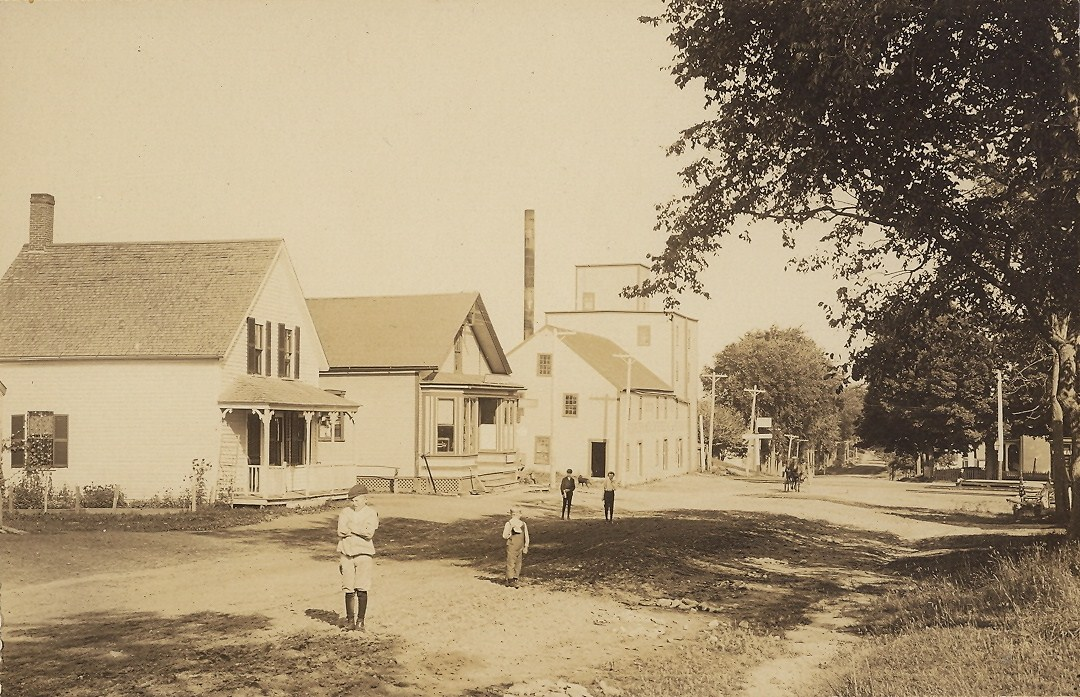
- Readfield Depot c. 1909

- Seal

- Location in Kennebec County and the state of Maine
- Coordinates: 44°22′41″N 69°57′03″W
- Country: United States
- State: Maine
- County: Kennebec
- Incorporated: 1791
- Villages: Readfield; Kents Hill; Readfield Depot

Area
  - Total: 30.95 sq mi (80.16 km^{2})
  - Land: 29.16 sq mi (75.52 km^{2})
  - Water: 1.79 sq mi (4.64 km^{2})
- Elevation: 256 ft (78 m)

Population (2020)
  - Total: 2,597
  - Density: 89/sq mi (34.4/km^{2})
- Time zone: UTC-5 (Eastern (EST))
  - Summer (DST): UTC-4 (EDT)
- ZIP code: 04355
- Area code: 207
- FIPS code: 23-62190
- GNIS feature ID: 582693
- Website: Town website

Readfield (/ˈriːdfiːld/ REED-field) is a town in Kennebec County, Maine, United States. The population was 2,597 at the 2020 census. Readfield is home to the Kents Hill School, a preparatory school, Maranacook Community Schools, public schools for the district, a few summer camps, and the annual Readfield Heritage Days. A popular recreation spot in central Maine, the town contains nine lakes and ponds, including Maranacook Lake, and is part of the Winthrop Lakes Region. The town of Readfield was previously named Pond Town. Readfield is included in the Augusta, Maine micropolitan and included in the Lewiston-Auburn, Maine metropolitan New England City and Town Area.

== Geography ==
According to the United States Census Bureau, the town has a total area of 30.95 square miles (80.16 km^{2}), of which 29.16 square miles (75.52 km^{2}) is land and 1.79 square miles (4.64 km^{2}) is water. Drained by Beaver Brook and Tingley Brook, Readfield includes the northern half of Maranacook Lake, the southern half of Torsey Pond, the southeast corner of Echo Lake, and the northeast shore of Lovejoy Pond.

The town is crossed by state routes 17, 41 and 135. It borders the towns of Manchester to the east, Winthrop to the south, Wayne to the southwest, Fayette to the west, and Mount Vernon and Belgrade to the north.

== Government ==
Readfield's municipal government's Town Manager is Eric Dyer. The type of government is a town meeting and five selectmen. The municipal facilities include a volunteer fire department, a small water system in the village, and private sewer.

== Demographics ==
Historical population
Census	Pop.	Note	%±
1800	938		—
1810	1,396		48.8%
1820	1,511		8.2%
1830	1,884		24.7%
1840	2,037		8.1%
1850	1,985		−2.6%
1860	1,510		−23.9%
1870	1,456		−3.6%
1880	1,243		−14.6%
1890	1,176		−5.4%
1900	994		−15.5%
1910	996		0.2%
1920	911		−8.5%
1930	881		−3.3%
1940	986		11.9%
1950	1,022		3.7%
1960	1,029		0.7%
1970	1,258		22.3%
1980	1,943		54.5%
1990	2,033		4.6%
2000	2,360		16.1%
2010	2,598		10.1%
2020	2,597		0.0%
U.S. Decennial Census

The occupational profile for 2000 was 585 jobs in Executive, Managerial and Professional; 218 jobs in Sales, Administration and Support; 155 jobs in service, seven jobs in Farm and Forestry, and 232 jobs in Skilled Labor.

By a population profile estimate, in 1960 there were 1,029 residents of the town. By 1970, it had grown by 22.3% to 1,258; by 1980 it had grown 54.5% to a population of 1,943. By 1990, it had grown 4.6% to a total of 2,033, and by 2000 it grew by 16.1% for a total of 2,360. A 2007 census estimated the current population at 2,530. The best estimate for 2020 is a population of 2,850.

=== 2010 census ===
At the 2010 census there were 2,598 people, 998 households, and 738 families living in the town. The population density was 89.1 inhabitants per square mile (34.4/km^{2}). There were 1,293 housing units at an average density of 44.3 per square mile (17.1/km^{2}). The racial makup of the town was 97.2% White, 0.3% African American, 0.3% Native American, 0.6% Asian, 0.2% Pacific Islander, 0.2% from other races, and 1.2% from two or more races. Hispanic or Latino of any race were 0.7%.

Of the 998 households 32.0% had children under the age of 18 living with them, 61.9% were married couples living together, 7.4% had a female householder with no husband present, 4.6% had a male householder with no wife present, and 26.1% were non-families. 19.6% of households were one person and 6.7% were one person aged 65 or older. The average household size was 2.56 and the average family size was 2.92.

The median age in the town was 43.4 years. 23.6% of residents were under the age of 18; 5.4% were between the ages of 18 and 24; 23.8% were from 25 to 44; 34.8% were from 45 to 64; and 12.4% were 65 or older. The gender makeup of the town was 49.7% male and 50.3% female.

=== 2000 census ===
At the 2000 census there were 2,360 people, 867 households, and 673 families living in the town. The population density was 80.8 inhabitants per square mile (31.2/km^{2}). There were 1,148 housing units at an average density of 39.3 per square mile (15.2/km^{2}). The racial makup of the town was 97.71% White, 0.08% African American, 0.25% Native American, 0.42% Asian, 0.08% Pacific Islander, 0.08% from other races, and 1.36% from two or more races. Hispanic or Latino of any race were 1.06%.

25% of Readfield residents report English ancestry, 12% French, 12% Irish, 8% German, 4% French Canadian, 4% Italian, 3% Scottish, 3% Swedish, 2% Scotch-Irish, 2% American Indian, 2% Norwegian, 1% Polish, 1% Arab, 1% Danish, 1% Swiss, 1% Lebanese, 1% Welsh and 1% Canadian.

Of the 867 households 39.8% had children under the age of 18 living with them, 66.4% were married couples living together, 8.0% had a female householder with no husband present, and 22.3% were non-families. 18.2% of households were one person and 5.7% were one person aged 65 or older. The average household size was 2.72 and the average family size was 3.10.

The age distribution was 28.7% under the age of 18, 5.7% from 18 to 24, 26.9% from 25 to 44, 27.9% from 45 to 64, and 10.8% 65 or older. The median age was 38 years. For every 100 females, there were 102.9 males. For every 100 females age 18 and over, there were 98.7 males.

The median household income was $48,893 and the median family income was $51,890. Males had a median income of $37,981 versus $27,971 for females. The per capita income for the town was $20,707. About 4.6% of families and 5.2% of the population were below the poverty line, including 3.5% of those under age 18 and 6.7% of those age 65 or over.

== Education ==
Public schools

- Maranacook Area Schools
  - Maranacook Community Middle School
  - Maranacook Community High School
  - Readfield Elementary

Private school

- Kents Hill School

== Site of interest ==
- Readfield Historical Society & Museum, which contains historical artifacts, documents and pictures related to the history of the Town of Readfield.

== Notable people ==
- Christian Duguay, comic actor
- Doug Friedman, professional ice hockey player
- John Hubbard, physician, 22nd governor of Maine
- Jonathan G. Hunton, 9th governor of Maine
- Anson P. Morrill, US congressman, 24th governor of Maine
- Mildred Brown Schrumpf, Maine food educator and columnist
- Timothy Simons, comic actor
