= West Gardiner, Maine =

Town in Maine, United States

- Town
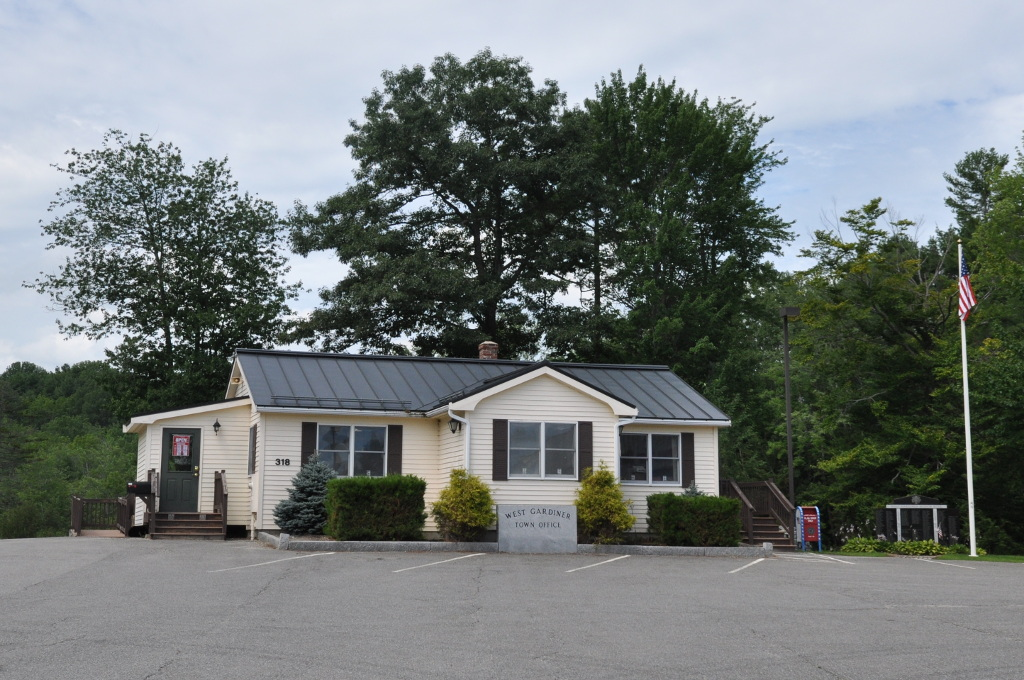
- West Gardiner Town Office

- Logo

- Location in Kennebec County and the state of Maine.
- Coordinates: 44°14′38″N 69°53′15″W
- Country: United States
- State: Maine
- County: Kennebec
- Villages: Browns Corner; Frenchs Corner; Spears Corner

Area
  - Total: 27.07 sq mi (70.11 km^{2})
  - Land: 24.63 sq mi (63.79 km^{2})
  - Water: 2.44 sq mi (6.32 km^{2})
- Elevation: 161 ft (49 m)

Population (2020)
  - Total: 3,671
  - Density: 149/sq mi (57.5/km^{2})
- Time zone: UTC-5 (Eastern (EST))
  - Summer (DST): UTC-4 (EDT)
- ZIP code: 04345
- Area code: 207
- FIPS code: 23-82945
- GNIS feature ID: 582806
- Website: www.westgardinermaine.org

West Gardiner is a town in Kennebec County, Maine, United States. The population was 3,671 at the 2020 census. West Gardiner is included in the Augusta, Maine micropolitan New England City and Town Area.

== Geography ==
According to the United States Census Bureau, the town has a total area of 27.07 square miles (70.11 km^{2}), of which, 24.63 square miles (63.79 km^{2}) of it is land and 2.44 square miles (6.32 km^{2}) is water. The town includes shoreline on Pleasant Pond (Cobbossecontee Stream).

== Demographics ==
Historical population
Census	Pop.	Note	%±
1860	1,294		—
1870	1,044		−19.3%
1880	977		−6.4%
1890	853		−12.7%
1900	693		−18.8%
1910	629		−9.2%
1920	553		−12.1%
1930	627		13.4%
1940	867		38.3%
1950	946		9.1%
1960	1,144		20.9%
1970	1,435		25.4%
1980	2,113		47.2%
1990	2,513		18.9%
2000	2,902		15.5%
2010	3,474		19.7%
2020	3,671		5.7%
U.S. Decennial Census

=== 2010 census ===
As of the census of 2010, there were 3,474 people, 1,368 households, and 983 families living in the town. The population density was 141.0 inhabitants per square mile (54.4/km^{2}). There were 1,556 housing units at an average density of 63.2 per square mile (24.4/km^{2}). The racial makeup of the town was 97.4% White, 0.4% African American, 0.4% Native American, 0.2% Asian, 0.2% from other races, and 1.3% from two or more races. Hispanic or Latino of any race were 0.8% of the population.

There were 1,368 households, of which 31.6% had children under the age of 18 living with them, 59.6% were married couples living together, 8.1% had a female householder with no husband present, 4.1% had a male householder with no wife present, and 28.1% were non-families. 20.5% of all households were made up of individuals, and 6.9% had someone living alone who was 65 years of age or older. The average household size was 2.53 and the average family size was 2.92.

The median age in the town was 42.1 years. 22.7% of residents were under the age of 18; 6.6% were between the ages of 18 and 24; 26.4% were from 25 to 44; 32.3% were from 45 to 64; and 11.9% were 65 years of age or older. The gender makeup of the town was 49.5% male and 50.5% female.

=== 2000 census ===
As of the census of 2000, there were 2,902 people, 1,115 households, and 831 families living in the town. The population density was 117.8 inhabitants per square mile (45.5/km^{2}). There were 1,308 housing units at an average density of 53.1 per square mile (20.5/km^{2}). The racial makeup of the town was 97.76% White, 0.52% African American, 0.28% Native American, 0.28% Asian, 0.34% from other races, and 0.83% from two or more races. Hispanic or Latino of any race were 0.45% of the population.

There were 1,115 households, out of which 35.4% had children under the age of 18 living with them, 61.7% were married couples living together, 9.1% had a female householder with no husband present, and 25.4% were non-families. 17.7% of all households were made up of individuals, and 5.3% had someone living alone who was 65 years of age or older. The average household size was 2.60 and the average family size was 2.93.

In the town, the population was spread out, with 25.0% under the age of 18, 6.7% from 18 to 24, 32.9% from 25 to 44, 26.1% from 45 to 64, and 9.4% who were 65 years of age or older. The median age was 37 years. For every 100 females, there were 97.3 males. For every 100 females age 18 and over, there were 95.1 males.

The median income for a household in the town was $45,434, and the median income for a family was $48,056. Males had a median income of $30,806 versus $26,357 for females. The per capita income for the town was $19,832. About 3.4% of families and 5.3% of the population were below the poverty line, including 2.7% of those under age 18 and 3.0% of those age 65 or over.

== Parks and recreation ==
Wakefield Wildlife Sanctuary is a 113-acre nature preserve in West Gardiner with more than 4,000 feet of shoreline on Cobbosseeconte Stream with public trails for hiking and cross-country skiing. There are two historic cabins in Wakefield Sanctuary that are powered by solar panels and that are rented to help fund the maintenance of the sanctuary.

== Notable people ==
- Earle McCormick, state senator; lived in West Gardiner
- John Frank Stevens, chief engineer on the Panama Canal (1905–1907); born in West Gardiner
- William H. Stevens, architect; born in West Gardiner
