= Great Pond =

- Location within Maine Location within the United States
- Location: Belgrade / Rome, Kennebec County, Maine, US
- Coordinates: 44°32′N 69°50′W
- Type: Mesotrophic, Glacial, Reservoir
- Primary outflows: Belgrade Stream, Long Pond
- Catchment area: 82.9 square miles (215 km^{2})
- Basin countries: United States
- Max. length: 7 miles (11 km)
- Max. width: 4 miles (6.4 km)
- Surface area: 8,533 acres (3,453 ha)
- Average depth: 21 feet (6.4 m)
- Max. depth: 69 feet (21 m)
- Water volume: 195,099 acre⋅ft (240,651,000 m^{3})
- Residence time: 2.3 years
- Shore length^{1}: 46.1 miles (74.2 km)
- Surface elevation: 248 feet (76 m)
- Islands: Hoyt Island, Chute Island, Joyce Island, Oak Island, Pine Island
- Settlements: Rome, Maine and Belgrade, Maine
- ^{1} Shore length is not a well-defined measure.

The largest great pond in US named Great Pond is located in Kennebec County and is part of the Kennebec River watershed. There are several other, smaller ponds named Great Pond in Maine and New England.

Great Pond receives water from several sources. Salmon Lake flows into the east side of Great Pond via a short channel near the village of North Belgrade. Great Meadow Stream flows into the north side of Great Pond, bringing the waters of North Pond and East Pond. Other tributaries of Great Pond include Robbins Mill Stream, Rome Trout Brook, and Austin Bog.

Great Pond's waters flow out to the west through the Great Pond Storage Dam and a short section of Belgrade Stream, into Long Pond, near the village of Belgrade Lakes.

The town of Rome is located at the north end of Great Pond. Most of Great Pond is located in the town of Belgrade.

There are several islands in Great Pond, including Hoyt Island, Chute Island, Joyce Island, Oak Island, Otter Island, and Pine Island.

North of the village of Belgrade Lakes, Long Pond is separated from Great Pond by a mountain called simply "The Mountain".

Great Pond was formed into its present shape by the construction of the Great Pond Storage Dam on Belgrade Stream in 1886. The dam was built for power generation and is 14 feet (4.3 m) high.

== See also ==
- Great pond (law)
