= Pearl Harbor Remembrance Bridge (Maine) =

Coordinates: 44.2333°N 69.7700°W

The Pearl Harbor Remembrance Bridge (formerly the Gardiner-Randolph Bridge), is a steel girder and concrete bridge that crosses the Kennebec River between Gardiner and Randolph, Maine. It carries Maine State Routes 9, 126, and 27. It was built in 1980 to replace an older truss bridge several hundred yards downstream. The bridge was given its current name in 2001 to honor the 60th anniversary of the attack on Pearl Harbor.
