= Winthrop (CDP), Maine =

Winthrop, Maine
- Census-designated place
- Location in Kennebec County and the state of Maine
- Coordinates: 44°18′47″N 69°57′54″W
- Country: United States
- State: Maine
- County: Kennebec
- Town: Winthrop

Area
  - Total: 7.20 sq mi (18.64 km^{2})
  - Land: 5.53 sq mi (14.32 km^{2})
  - Water: 1.67 sq mi (4.32 km^{2})
- Elevation: 269 ft (82 m)

Population (2020)
  - Total: 2,666
  - Density: 482.2/sq mi (186.17/km^{2})
- Time zone: UTC-5 (Eastern (EST))
  - Summer (DST): UTC-4 (EDT)
- ZIP code: 04364
- Area code: 207
- FIPS code: 23-86935
- GNIS feature ID: 2377970

Winthrop is a census-designated place (CDP) comprising the primary settlement in the town of Winthrop in Kennebec County, Maine, United States. The population was 2,650 at the 2010 census, out of 6,092 in the town of Winthrop as a whole.

== Geography ==
Winthrop is located in southwestern Kennebec County in the center of the town of Winthrop. The village is in the Winthrop Lakes Region and sits between the outlet of Maranacook Lake and the inlet of Annabessacook Lake along their connecting stream, which falls 40 feet (12 m) in 0.6 miles (0.97 km). The CDP includes rural land surrounding the village, extending east to the shore of Upper Narrows Pond, south down Annabessacook Lake to the inlet of Hoyt Brook, north up Maranacook Lake to the Readfield town line, and west along Hoyt Brook and Maine State Route 41.

U.S. Route 202, with Maine State Routes 11 and 100, passes through the central part of the CDP, passing just south of the village center. US 202 leads east 10 miles (16 km) to Augusta, the state capital, and southwest 19 miles (31 km) to Lewiston. Routes 41 and 133 pass through the village center. Route 41 leads north 6 miles (10 km) to the center of Readfield, while Route 133 leads northwest 17 miles (27 km) to Livermore Falls.

According to the United States Census Bureau, the Winthrop CDP has a total area of 7.2 square miles (18.7 km^{2}), of which 5.6 square miles (14.4 km^{2}) are land and 1.6 square miles (4.2 km^{2}), or 22.58%, are water. The Winthrop Lakes network drains via Cobbosseecontee Lake and Stream southeast to the Kennebec River at Gardiner.

== Demographics ==
Historical population
Census	Pop.	Note	%±
2020	2,666		—
U.S. Decennial Census

As of the census of 2000, there were 2,893 people, 1,188 households, and 780 families residing in the CDP. The population density was 520.7 inhabitants per square mile (201.0/km^{2}). There were 1,344 housing units at an average density of 241.9 per square mile (93.4/km^{2}). The racial makeup of the CDP was 98.00% White, 0.52% Black or African American, 0.35% Native American, 0.38% Asian, 0.07% from other races, and 0.69% from two or more races. Hispanic or Latino of any race were 0.41% of the population.

There were 1,188 households, out of which 29.4% had children under the age of 18 living with them, 51.2% were married couples living together, 11.9% had a female householder with no husband present, and 34.3% were non-families. 28.0% of all households were made up of individuals, and 10.2% had someone living alone who was 65 years of age or older. The average household size was 2.30 and the average family size was 2.81.

In the CDP the population was spread out, with 21.7% under the age of 18, 6.5% from 18 to 24, 25.5% from 25 to 44, 25.3% from 45 to 64, and 21.0% who were 65 years of age or older. The median age was 43 years. For every 100 females there were 95.6 males. For every 100 females age 18 and over, there were 91.5 males.

The median income for a household in the CDP was $38,403, and the median income for a family was $47,875. Males had a median income of $33,826 versus $26,732 for females. The per capita income for the CDP was $19,075. About 7.2% of families and 9.6% of the population were below the poverty line, including 12.4% of those under age 18 and 10.8% of those age 65 or over.
