= Vienna, Maine =

Town in Maine, United States

- Town
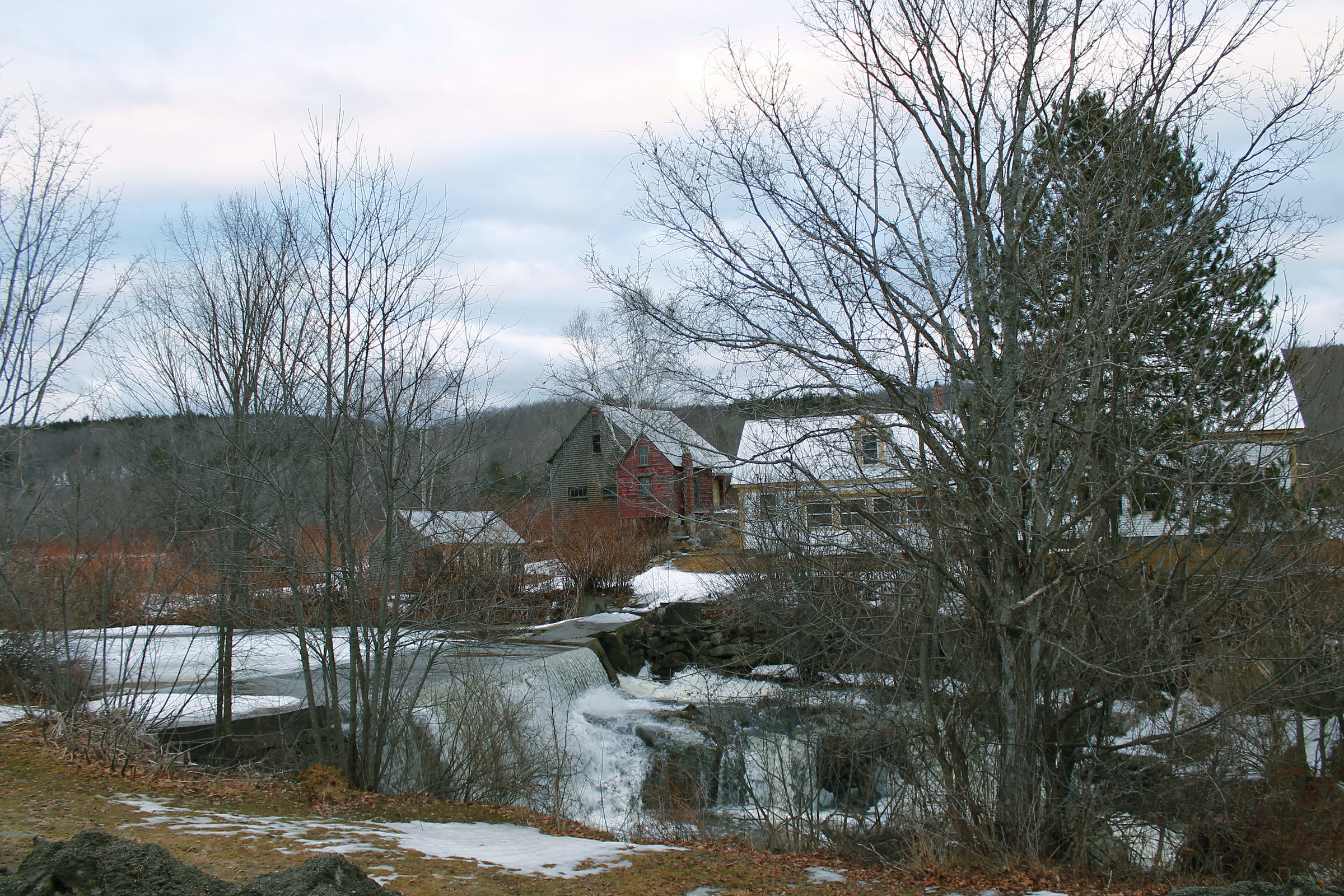
- A farm and mill in Vienna.

- Seal

- Location in Kennebec County and the state of Maine.
- Coordinates: 44°32′58″N 69°59′20″W
- Country: United States
- State: Maine
- County: Kennebec

Area
  - Total: 25.51 sq mi (66.07 km^{2})
  - Land: 24.30 sq mi (62.94 km^{2})
  - Water: 1.21 sq mi (3.13 km^{2})
- Elevation: 709 ft (216 m)

Population (2020)
  - Total: 578
  - Density: 24/sq mi (9.2/km^{2})
- Time zone: UTC-5 (Eastern (EST))
  - Summer (DST): UTC-4 (EDT)
- ZIP code: 04360
- Area code: 207
- FIPS code: 23-79025
- GNIS feature ID: 582781
- Website: Vienna, Maine

Vienna is a town in Kennebec County, Maine, United States. The population was 578 at the 2020 census.

== Geography ==
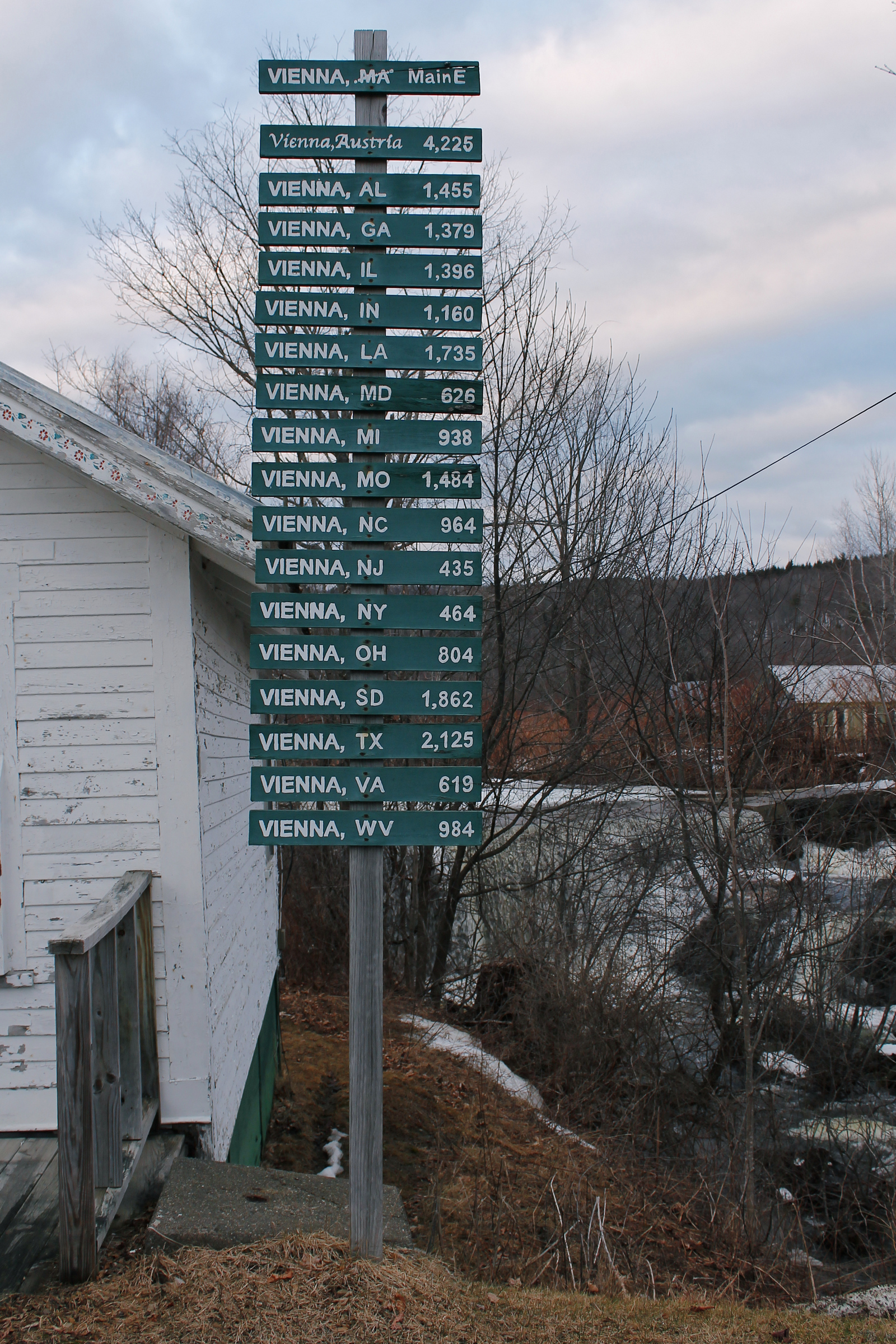
A series of signs in Vienna designating the distances to other United States cities named Vienna.

According to the United States Census Bureau, the town has a total area of 25.51 square miles (66.07 km^{2}), of which 24.30 square miles (62.94 km^{2}) is land and 1.21 square miles (3.13 km^{2}) is water.

== Demographics ==
Historical population
Census	Pop.	Note	%±
1800	270		—
1810	417		54.4%
1820	665		59.5%
1830	722		8.6%
1840	891		23.4%
1850	851		−4.5%
1860	878		3.2%
1870	740		−15.7%
1880	644		−13.0%
1890	495		−23.1%
1900	406		−18.0%
1910	403		−0.7%
1920	366		−9.2%
1930	318		−13.1%
1940	301		−5.3%
1950	231		−23.3%
1960	160		−30.7%
1970	205		28.1%
1980	454		121.5%
1990	417		−8.1%
2000	527		26.4%
2010	570		8.2%
2020	578		1.4%
U.S. Decennial Census

=== 2010 census ===
At the 2010 census there were 570 people, 251 households, and 179 families living in the town. The population density was 23.5 inhabitants per square mile (9.1/km^{2}). There were 418 housing units at an average density of 17.2 per square mile (6.6/km^{2}). The racial makeup of the town was 97.9% White, 0.4% Native American, 0.2% from other races, and 1.6% from two or more races. Hispanic or Latino of any race were 1.2%.

Of the 251 households 21.1% had children under the age of 18 living with them, 62.9% were married couples living together, 5.6% had a female householder with no husband present, 2.8% had a male householder with no wife present, and 28.7% were non-families. 23.5% of households were one person and 9.2% were one person aged 65 or older. The average household size was 2.27 and the average family size was 2.66.

The median age in the town was 49.6 years. 16.5% of residents were under the age of 18; 7% were between the ages of 18 and 24; 18.6% were from 25 to 44; 39% were from 45 to 64; and 18.8% were 65 or older. The gender makeup of the town was 50.0% male and 50.0% female.

=== 2000 census ===
At the 2000 census there were 527 people, 214 households, and 154 families living in the town. The population density was 21.8 people per square mile (8.4/km^{2}). There were 367 housing units at an average density of 15.2 per square mile (5.9/km^{2}). The racial makeup of the town was 98.67% White, 0.38% African American, 0.19% Native American, and 0.76% from two or more races. Hispanic or Latino of any race were 0.76%.

Of the 214 households 30.4% had children under the age of 18 living with them, 63.1% were married couples living together, 5.6% had a female householder with no husband present, and 28.0% were non-families. 22.4% of households were one person and 7.0% were one person aged 65 or older. The average household size was 2.46 and the average family size was 2.92.

The age distribution was 23.1% under the age of 18, 6.8% from 18 to 24, 25.0% from 25 to 44, 35.9% from 45 to 64, and 9.1% 65 or older. The median age was 43 years. For every 100 females, there were 104.3 males. For every 100 females age 18 and over, there were 99.5 males.

The median household income was $36,985 and the median family income was $41,146. Males had a median income of $30,469 versus $21,818 for females. The per capita income for the town was $15,987. About 5.7% of families and 9.3% of the population were below the poverty line, including 4.6% of those under age 18 and 22.8% of those age 65 or over.

== Notable people ==
- Milton Bradley, inventor of board game The Game of Life, founder of Milton Bradley Company
- Samuel P. Morrill (1816–1892), US congressman; minister
- Benjamin White, US congressman
