= Kennebec County, Maine =

County in Maine, United States

- County
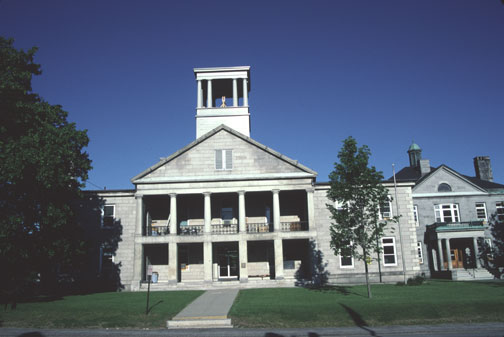
- Kennebec County Courthouse

- Seal

- Location within the U.S. state of Maine
- Coordinates: 44°24′00″N 69°47′04″W
- Country: United States
- State: Maine
- Founded: 1799
- Named for: Kennebec River
- Seat: Augusta
- Largest city: Augusta

Area
  - Total: 951 sq mi (2,460 km^{2})
  - Land: 868 sq mi (2,250 km^{2})
  - Water: 84 sq mi (220 km^{2}) 8.8%

Population (2020)
  - Total: 123,642
  - Estimate (2025): 129,067 ▲
  - Density: 142/sq mi (55.0/km^{2})
- Time zone: UTC−5 (Eastern)
  - Summer (DST): UTC−4 (EDT)
- Congressional districts: 1st, 2nd
- Website: kennebec.gov

Kennebec County is a county located in the South-central portion of the U.S. state of Maine. At the 2020 census, the population was 123,642. Its county seat is Augusta, the state's capital. The county was established on February 20, 1799, from portions of Cumberland and Lincoln Counties. The name "Kennebec" comes from the Eastern Abenaki /kínipekʷ/, meaning "large body of still water, large bay".

Kennebec County comprises the Augusta–Waterville, ME Micropolitan Statistical Area.

In 2010, the center of population of Maine was in Kennebec County, in the city of Augusta.

== Geography ==
According to the U.S. Census Bureau, the county has a total area of 951 square miles (2,460 km^{2}), of which 868 square miles (2,250 km^{2}) is land and 84 square miles (220 km^{2}) (8.8%) is water.

The county is nearly bisected by the Kennebec River, which also forms parts of the county line in the north and south of the county. The county is also dotted by many lakes and ponds, as well as the Kennebec Highlands in the northwest part of the county.

=== Adjacent counties ===
- Somerset County – north
- Waldo County – east
- Sagadahoc County – south
- Lincoln County – south
- Androscoggin County – southwest
- Franklin County – northwest

=== Major highways ===
- I-95
- I-295
- US 201
- US 202
- SR 8
- SR 9
- SR 11
- SR 17
- SR 23
- SR 27
- SR 32
- SR 41
- SR 100
- SR 104
- SR 105
- SR 126
- SR 132
- SR 133
- SR 135
- SR 139
- SR 194
- SR 197
- SR 226

== Demographics ==
Historical population
Census	Pop.	Note	%±
1800	24,571		—
1810	32,564		32.5%
1820	42,623		30.9%
1830	52,485		23.1%
1840	55,823		6.4%
1850	62,521		12.0%
1860	55,655		−11.0%
1870	53,203		−4.4%
1880	53,058		−0.3%
1890	57,012		7.5%
1900	59,117		3.7%
1910	62,863		6.3%
1920	63,844		1.6%
1930	70,691		10.7%
1940	77,231		9.3%
1950	83,881		8.6%
1960	89,150		6.3%
1970	95,247		6.8%
1980	109,889		15.4%
1990	115,904		5.5%
2000	117,114		1.0%
2010	122,151		4.3%
2020	123,642		1.2%
2025 (est.)	129,067	▲	4.4%
U.S. Decennial Census; 1790–1960 1900–1990; 1990–2000 2010–2019

=== 2020 census ===
As of the 2020 census, the county had a population of 123,642. Of the residents, 18.8% were under the age of 18 and 21.1% were 65 years of age or older; the median age was 44.9 years. For every 100 females there were 95.7 males, and for every 100 females age 18 and over there were 93.9 males. 37.8% of residents lived in urban areas and 62.2% lived in rural areas.

The racial makeup of the county was 91.9% White, 0.7% Black or African American, 0.4% American Indian and Alaska Native, 1.0% Asian, 0.0% Native Hawaiian and Pacific Islander, 0.7% from some other race, and 5.2% from two or more races. Hispanic or Latino residents of any race comprised 2.1% of the population.

There were 53,223 households in the county, of which 24.6% had children under the age of 18 living with them and 26.2% had a female householder with no spouse or partner present. About 30.9% of all households were made up of individuals and 13.7% had someone living alone who was 65 years of age or older.

There were 62,607 housing units, of which 15.0% were vacant. Among occupied housing units, 70.6% were owner-occupied and 29.4% were renter-occupied. The homeowner vacancy rate was 1.4% and the rental vacancy rate was 6.0%.

Kennebec County, Maine – Racial and ethnic composition Note: the US Census treats Hispanic/Latino as an ethnic category. This table excludes Latinos from the racial categories and assigns them to a separate category. Hispanics/Latinos may be of any race.
Race / Ethnicity (NH = Non-Hispanic)	Pop 2000	Pop 2010	Pop 2020	% 2000	% 2010	% 2020
White alone (NH)	113,566	116,549	112,682	96.97%	95.41%	91.13%
Black or African American alone (NH)	384	642	850	0.32%	0.52%	0.68%
Native American or Alaska Native alone (NH)	450	559	460	0.38%	0.45%	0.37%
Asian alone (NH)	685	886	1,215	0.58%	0.72%	0.98%
Pacific Islander alone (NH)	23	44	29	0.01%	0.03%	0.02%
Other race alone (NH)	54	93	385	0.04%	0.07%	0.31%
Mixed race or Multiracial (NH)	1,100	1,874	5,469	0.93%	1.53%	4.42%
Hispanic or Latino (any race)	852	1,504	2,552	0.72%	1.23%	2.06%
Total	117,114	122,151	123,642	100.00%	100.00%	100.00%

=== 2010 census ===
As of the 2010 United States census, there were 122,151 people, 51,128 households, and 32,368 families living in the county. The population density was 140.8 inhabitants per square mile (54.4/km^{2}). There were 60,972 housing units at an average density of 70.3 units per square mile (27.1 units/km^{2}). The racial makeup of the county was % from other races, and % from two or more races. Those of Hispanic or Latino origin made up % of the population. In terms of ancestry, 24.2% were English, 17.0% were Irish, 8.3% were German, 7.7% were French Canadian, 5.7% were American, and 5.4% were Scottish.

The median income for a household in the county was $45,973 and the median income for a family was $56,853. Males had a median income of $42,176 versus $32,471 for females. The per capita income for the county was $24,656. About 7.8% of families and 12.5% of the population were below the poverty line, including 16.9% of those under age 18 and 9.6% of those age 65 or over.

=== 2000 census ===
As of the census of 2000, there were 117,114 people, 47,683 households, and 31,327 families living in the county. The population density was 135 people per square mile (52 people/km^{2}). There were 56,364 housing units at an average density of 65 per square mile (25/km^{2}). The racial makeup of the county was 97.45% White, 0.34% Black or African American, 0.40% Native American, 0.59% Asian, 0.02% Pacific Islander, 0.18% from other races, and 1.02% from two or more races. 0.73% of the population were Hispanic or Latino of any race. 20.6% were of English, 17.4% French, 13.4% French Canadian, 10.9% United States or American and 9.9% Irish ancestry. 92.5% spoke only English at home, while 5.48% spoke French.

There were 47,683 households, out of which 31.20% had children under the age of 18 living with them, 51.60% were married couples living together, 10.00% had a female householder with no husband present, and 34.30% were non-families. 27.60% of all households were made up of individuals, and 10.60% had someone living alone who was 65 years of age or older. The average household size was 2.38 and the average family size was 2.89.

In the county, the population was spread out, with 23.80% under the age of 18, 8.50% from 18 to 24, 28.60% from 25 to 44, 24.90% from 45 to 64, and 14.20% who were 65 years of age or older. The median age was 39 years. For every 100 females there were 94.00 males. For every 100 females age 18 and over, there were 90.80 males.

The median income for a household in the county was $36,498, and the median income for a family was $43,814. Males had a median income of $32,279 versus $24,032 for females. The per capita income for the county was $18,520. About 8.50% of families and 11.10% of the population were below the poverty line, including 13.20% of those under age 18 and 10.20% of those age 65 or over.

== Micropolitan statistical area ==
Kennebec County has been designated as the Augusta–Waterville, ME Micropolitan Statistical Area (μSA) by the United States Office of Management and Budget. As of the 2010 U.S. census the micropolitan area ranked the most populous in the State of Maine and also the only micropolitan area within the state. The area also ranks 14th most populous in the United States with a population of 125,540 as of July 2022.

== Economy ==
Kennebec County's economy has traditionally been industrial. A large amount of paper and textiles were produced, and mills sprung up along the Kennebec river. The median household income in the country is about $70,000, while per-capita income is about $38,000 (2024 data).

As of 2026, the unemployment rate is three percent. The poverty rate is about 11 percent.

Notable employers in Kennebec County include Central Maine Power, MaineHealth, Thomas College, T-Mobile, and Walmart. FirstPark is a notable business park in the county, located in Oakland.

== Education ==
There are three colleges: Colby College and Thomas College (both in Waterville), and the University of Maine at Augusta. There are 19 school districts (however, 4 are consolidated ones). In China, there is no public high school, but a private school (Erskine Academy) exists, and the town pays for students' tuition if they choose to attend. Students from Vassalboro can pick from one of four school districts (Cony in Augusta, Erskine, Winslow, or Waterville). However, many towns have local public high schools.

K-12 school districts include:

- Augusta School District
- Fayette School District
- Vassalboro School District
- Waterville School District
- Winslow School District
- Winthrop School District
- Regional School Unit 02
- Regional School Unit 04
- Regional School Unit 18
- Regional School Unit 12
- Regional School Unit 38
- School Administrative District 09
- School Administrative District 11
- School Administrative District 49

There is also the Kennebec Unorganized Territory. Unorganized territory is not in any municipality. The Maine Department of Education takes responsibility for coordinating school assignments in the unorganized territory. The state assigns the "Unity Township" area in Kennebec County to Unity School, Mount View Middle School, and Mount View High School of Regional School Unit 3 of Unity, Waldo County.

== Politics ==
Kennebec County is the only county in Maine that is split between Maine's two congressional districts. The larger, southern portion of the county is in the 1st Congressional District, while the northern, smaller portion is in the 2nd Congressional District. While the more rural areas support the Republican Party, the urban areas are strongly Democratic.

Historically, the county was more Democratic-leaning than the rest of the state in presidential elections. Kennebec County had consistently voted for Democrats in recent elections, until 2016 when it voted for Republican Donald Trump, the first time it had voted Republican since 1988. The county voted for Democrat Franklin D. Roosevelt in 1940 even as Republican Wendell Willkie narrowly carried Maine, and it voted for Democrat Jimmy Carter in 1976 as Republican Gerald Ford also narrowly won the state. In more recent elections, the county voted in-line with the state, voting for the statewide winner in every election from 1980 to 2012. In 2020, it was the closest county in the state, with Democrat Joe Biden defeating Trump by just 181 votes. Kennebec swung back into the Republican column in 2024, with Trump carrying the county this time with a full majority.

=== Voter registration ===
Voter registration and party enrollment as of March 2024
Republican	27,635	32.92%
Democratic	27,487	32.74%
Unenrolled	24,455	29.13%
Green Independent	3,698	4.41%
Libertarian	403	0.48%
No Labels	271	0.32%
Total	83,949	100%

United States presidential election results for Kennebec County, Maine
Year	Republican / Whig		Democratic		Third party(ies)	
Year	No.	%	No.	%	No.	%
1836	1,867	51.04%	1,791	48.96%	0	0.00%
1840	6,905	65.96%	3,521	33.63%	43	0.41%
1844	5,393	56.83%	3,535	37.25%	561	5.91%
1848	5,056	54.10%	2,634	28.18%	1,656	17.72%
1852	4,489	55.11%	2,703	33.18%	954	11.71%
1856	7,320	72.14%	2,487	24.51%	340	3.35%
1860	6,599	70.90%	2,353	25.28%	356	3.82%
1864	6,803	67.02%	3,347	32.98%	0	0.00%
1868	7,283	70.40%	3,062	29.60%	0	0.00%
1872	6,232	73.67%	2,227	26.33%	0	0.00%
1876	6,751	62.26%	4,093	37.74%	0	0.00%
1880	7,771	59.00%	5,001	37.97%	400	3.04%
1884	7,572	61.30%	3,906	31.62%	874	7.08%
1888	7,453	62.46%	4,139	34.69%	340	2.85%
1892	6,165	57.27%	4,094	38.03%	506	4.70%
1896	7,889	71.70%	2,817	25.60%	297	2.70%
1900	6,228	62.60%	3,410	34.27%	311	3.13%
1904	5,765	68.68%	2,333	27.79%	296	3.53%
1908	6,133	65.99%	2,871	30.89%	290	3.12%
1912	1,782	15.20%	4,397	37.50%	5,547	47.31%
1916	6,731	53.71%	5,527	44.11%	273	2.18%
1920	12,333	68.62%	5,466	30.41%	174	0.97%
1924	13,122	72.26%	4,184	23.04%	853	4.70%
1928	15,541	65.14%	8,226	34.48%	92	0.39%
1932	14,451	53.93%	12,110	45.19%	236	0.88%
1936	14,987	55.34%	11,268	41.61%	826	3.05%
1940	14,877	48.36%	15,861	51.56%	27	0.09%
1944	14,335	50.42%	14,070	49.49%	25	0.09%
1948	13,923	55.12%	11,163	44.19%	174	0.69%
1952	21,207	63.59%	12,113	36.32%	31	0.09%
1956	23,028	66.73%	11,483	33.27%	0	0.00%
1960	21,699	54.31%	18,252	45.69%	0	0.00%
1964	11,307	31.28%	24,813	68.65%	23	0.06%
1968	16,009	41.81%	21,752	56.81%	531	1.39%
1972	24,617	59.99%	16,379	39.91%	39	0.10%
1976	22,534	47.53%	23,473	49.51%	1,400	2.95%
1980	21,517	43.84%	20,943	42.67%	6,617	13.48%
1984	31,753	59.70%	21,183	39.82%	255	0.48%
1988	27,734	53.60%	23,578	45.57%	433	0.84%
1992	17,135	26.81%	25,125	39.31%	21,661	33.89%
1996	15,403	27.68%	30,257	54.37%	9,994	17.96%
2000	23,967	40.69%	31,198	52.96%	3,742	6.35%
2004	29,761	44.57%	35,616	53.34%	1,395	2.09%
2008	27,482	41.65%	37,238	56.43%	1,266	1.92%
2012	26,519	41.76%	35,068	55.23%	1,910	3.01%
2016	31,675	47.84%	29,302	44.26%	5,231	7.90%
2020	34,721	48.32%	34,902	48.57%	2,235	3.11%
2024	36,589	50.20%	34,585	47.45%	1,712	2.35%

== Communities ==
=== Cities ===
- Augusta (county seat)
- Gardiner
- Hallowell
- Waterville

=== Towns ===
- Albion
- Belgrade
- Benton
- Chelsea
- China
- Clinton
- Farmingdale
- Fayette
- Litchfield
- Manchester
- Monmouth
- Mount Vernon
- Oakland
- Pittston
- Randolph
- Readfield
- Rome
- Sidney
- Vassalboro
- Vienna
- Wayne
- West Gardiner
- Windsor
- Winslow
- Winthrop

=== Unorganized territory ===
- Unity

=== Census-designated places ===
- Clinton
- Farmingdale
- Oakland
- Winthrop

=== Other unincorporated villages ===
- China Village
- East Vassalboro
- East Winthrop
- Libby Hill
- North Monmouth
- North Vassalboro
- South China

== See also ==
- National Register of Historic Places listings in Kennebec County, Maine
