= Great pond (law) =

Legal term defining public waters in the United States

A great pond in the United States is a pond or lake that is held in trust by the state for public use. Generally, any natural body of water that is larger than 10 acres (40,000 m^{2}) in size is considered public water. In certain New England states, this legal definition exists at both common law and statutory law.

== History ==
As is often the case in the United States, the "law of great ponds" descended from early English common law. In 1890, Charles Doe, Chief Justice of the New Hampshire Supreme Court, described the development of the law of great ponds in Concord Mfg. Co. v. Robertson, a case concerning the rights of individuals to cut and remove ice from a pond adjacent to land they had leased, subsequently reducing the flow of water at a downstream mill. The rights of the ice harvesters and mill owners turned on the question of who owned the water in the pond. In the opinion, Chief Justice Doe stated that "[t]ide waters and large ponds are public waters. Whatever exceptions, if any, may be found, this is the rule."

The English rule used to distinguish between public and private waters was based on the limit of the tide, for those waters that were navigable were subject to admiralty jurisdiction. In the U.S., this rule had been extended to include navigable fresh water "reasonably capable of valuable use as a public way." However, it was not always clear that a pond – isolated from the ocean or a navigable river, but otherwise in the public domain – was reserved for public use. Furthermore, the ability to hunt and fish on public lands had been denied to citizens during feudal times, and that "system of legal inequality in the enjoyment of public property" was precisely what the colonists sought to avoid. Thus, a new rule defining public waters needed to be established that was not based on the navigability of the waters.

From the Concord Mfg. Co. decision:

By the English rule thus modified, the legal title of New Hampshire land was in the king, who held it as trustee in his official and representative capacity, with no private interest. The dry land, and the soil under fresh rivers, brooks, and small ponds, was convertible, by his grant, into private property, for settlement, and for the advancement of the common welfare. The seashore, arms of the sea, and large ponds, by reason of their special adaptation to public uses, were set apart and reserved as public waters. They could not be converted into private estate or subjected to a private easement, by the trustee's grant, or by any act of the executive branch of the government. The distinction is between what the trustee held for public use and what he held for the purpose of sale or other appropriation to private use for the public benefit. In 1647 the want of a definition of "great ponds" was supplied ... that no town shall appropriate to any particular person or persons any great pond containing more than ten acres of land, and that no man shall come upon another's propriety [sic] without their leave.

== Maine ==
A great pond is defined in Maine state statute as "any inland body of water which in a natural state has a surface area in excess of 10 acres (40,000 m^{2}) and any inland body of water artificially formed or increased which has a surface area in excess of 30 acres (120,000 m^{2}) except for the purposes of this article, where the artificially formed or increased inland body of water is completely surrounded by land held by a single owner."

The term "great pond" originally derives from colonial statutes pre-dating Maine's separation from Massachusetts. Special statutory regulations apply to land adjacent to great ponds for the purposes of shoreland protection and timber harvesting. Maine state law provides for public access to "great ponds."

== Massachusetts ==
A great pond is defined in Massachusetts statutes as a pond or lake that is in its natural state at least 10 acres (40,000 m^{2}) in size. This includes ponds that met the criterion at one time but are now smaller.

Massachusetts General Law states that all great ponds must be open for fishing and boating, including providing reasonable access to the pond, except for reservoirs.

== New Hampshire ==
In New Hampshire, public waters are defined by common law to include all natural ponds of more than 10 acres (40,000 m^{2}). In addition to the common law definition of great ponds, similar definitions can be found in the New Hampshire Revised Statutes Annotated, for example, in the Wetlands Act, RSA 482-A:21.
