= Randolph, Maine =

Town in Maine, United States

- Town
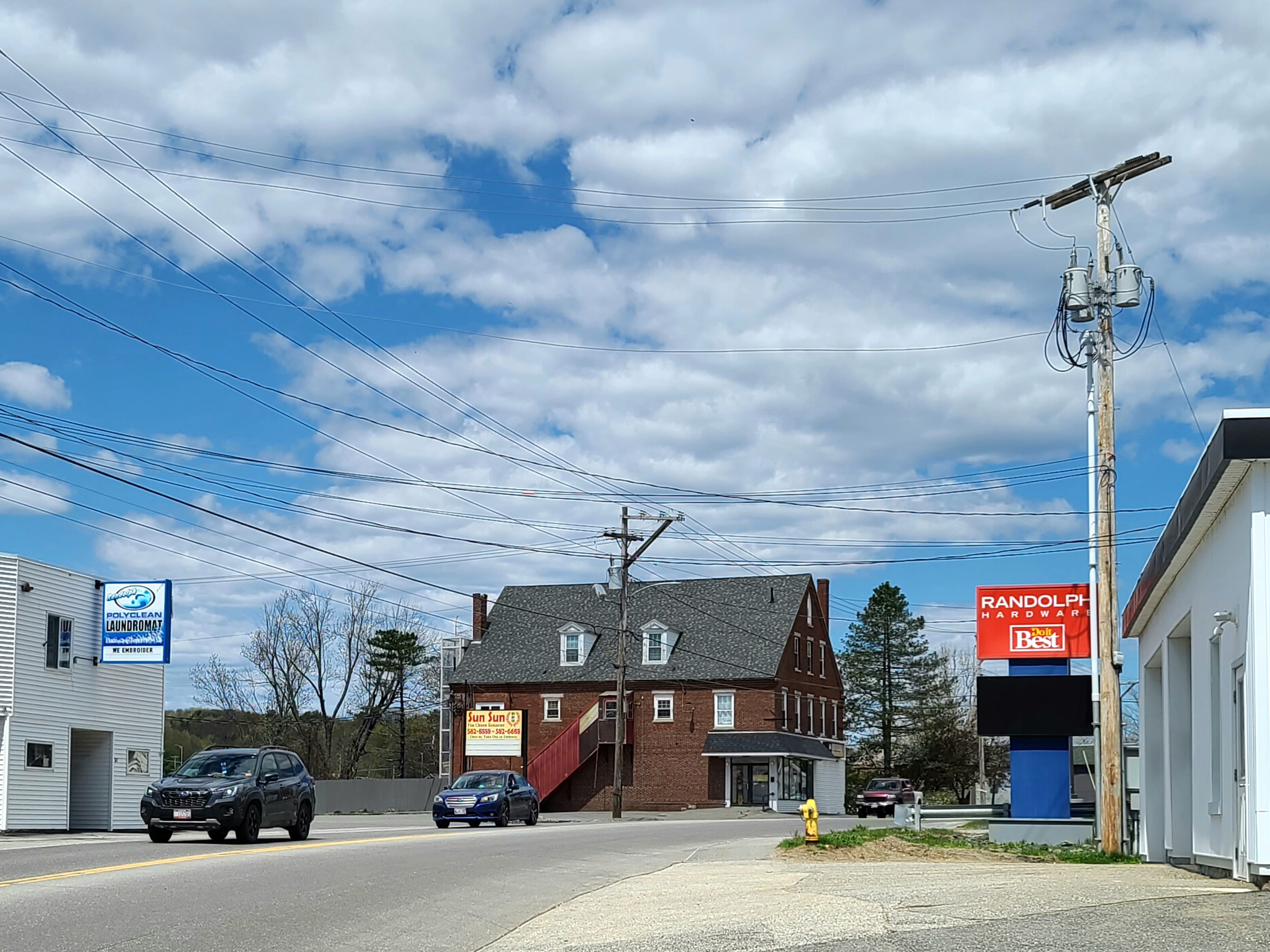
- Water Street
- Motto: "the smallest town in Maine....... by area !"
- Location in Kennebec County and the state of Maine.
- Coordinates: 44°14′03″N 69°45′46″W
- Country: United States
- State: Maine
- County: Kennebec

Area
  - Total: 2.23 sq mi (5.78 km^{2})
  - Land: 2.13 sq mi (5.52 km^{2})
  - Water: 0.10 sq mi (0.26 km^{2})
- Elevation: 141 ft (43 m)

Population (2020)
  - Total: 1,743
  - Density: 818/sq mi (315.8/km^{2})
- Time zone: UTC-5 (Eastern (EST))
  - Summer (DST): UTC-4 (EDT)
- ZIP code: 04346
- Area code: 207
- FIPS code: 23-61700
- GNIS feature ID: 582689
- Website: www.randolphmaine.org

Randolph is a town and a census-designated place (CDP) in Kennebec County, Maine, United States. The population was 1,743 at the 2020 census. The town was named for Randolph, Massachusetts. Randolph is included in the Augusta, Maine micropolitan New England City and Town Area. Randolph is the smallest municipality by area in Maine that is not an island.

== Geography ==
Randolph is located south of Augusta on the east side of the Kennebec River at the confluence of the Cobbesseeconte Stream. Gardiner lies just across the river.

According to the United States Census Bureau, the town has a total area of 2.23 square miles (5.78 km^{2}), of which 2.13 square miles (5.52 km^{2}) is land and 0.10 square miles (0.26 km^{2}) is water.

== Schools ==
Randolph is part of the Maine School Administrative District #11. The Teresa C. Hamlin School, which had served elementary school students, was closed in 2018 due to declining enrollment and students are now bused to what is now called the Pittston-Randolph Consolidated School a mile away.

== Demographics ==
Historical population
Census	Pop.	Note	%±
1890	1,281		—
1900	1,077		−15.9%
1910	1,017		−5.6%
1920	1,145		12.6%
1930	1,377		20.3%
1940	1,612		17.1%
1950	1,733		7.5%
1960	1,724		−0.5%
1970	1,741		1.0%
1980	1,834		5.3%
1990	1,949		6.3%
2000	1,911		−1.9%
2010	1,772		−7.3%
2020	1,743		−1.6%
U.S. Decennial Census

=== 2010 census ===
As of the census of 2010, there were 1,772 people, 813 households, and 489 families living in the town. The population density was 831.9 inhabitants per square mile (321.2/km^{2}). There were 900 housing units at an average density of 422.5 per square mile (163.1/km^{2}). The racial makeup of the town was 97.3% White, 0.4% African American, 0.5% Native American, 0.3% Asian, 0.3% from other races, and 1.2% from two or more races. Hispanic or Latino of any race were 1.4% of the population.

There were 813 households, of which 25.8% had children under the age of 18 living with them, 43.2% were married couples living together, 11.7% had a female householder with no husband present, 5.3% had a male householder with no wife present, and 39.9% were non-families. 33.5% of all households were made up of individuals, and 15.7% had someone living alone who was 65 years of age or older. The average household size was 2.18 and the average family size was 2.73.

The median age in the town was 44.7 years. 19.7% of residents were under the age of 18; 7.4% were between the ages of 18 and 24; 23.1% were from 25 to 44; 29.6% were from 45 to 64; and 20% were 65 years of age or older. The gender makeup of the town was 46.6% male and 53.4% female.

=== 2000 census ===
As of the census of 2000, there were 1,911 people, 829 households, and 536 families living in the town. The population density was 897.6 inhabitants per square mile (346.6/km^{2}). There were 884 housing units at an average density of 415.2 per square mile (160.3/km^{2}). The racial makeup of the town was 97.23% White, 0.47% Black or African American, 0.52% Native American, 0.26% Asian, 0.26% from other races, and 1.26% from two or more races. Hispanic or Latino of any race were 0.84% of the population.

There were 829 households, out of which 30.9% had children under the age of 18 living with them, 47.4% were married couples living together, 12.8% had a female householder with no husband present, and 35.3% were non-families. 30.0% of all households were made up of individuals, and 12.7% had someone living alone who was 65 years of age or older. The average household size was 2.30 and the average family size was 2.82.

In the town, the population was spread out, with 24.9% under the age of 18, 7.1% from 18 to 24, 28.0% from 25 to 44, 23.0% from 45 to 64, and 17.0% who were 65 years of age or older. The median age was 39 years. For every 100 females, there were 93.0 males. For every 100 females age 18 and over, there were 82.6 males.

The median income for a household in the town was $31,046, and the median income for a family was $38,920. Males had a median income of $31,196 versus $20,313 for females. The per capita income for the town was $15,742. About 9.1% of families and 10.4% of the population were below the poverty line, including 13.2% of those under age 18 and 12.2% of those age 65 or over.

== Transportation ==
Randolph is situated at the eastern bank of the Kennebec River at the opposite side of Gardiner, linked with that city via a road bridge. The river was navigable up to Augusta where the Edwards Dam was built. From 1890 to 1929 the Kennebec Central Railroad ran from Randolph to the National Soldiers' Home in Togus.
