= Wiscasset (CDP), Maine =

Wiscasset, Maine
- Census-designated place
- Location in Lincoln County and the state of Maine
- Coordinates: 44°00′20″N 69°40′40″W
- Country: United States
- State: Maine
- County: Lincoln
- Town: Wiscasset

Area
  - Total: 3.93 sq mi (10.19 km^{2})
  - Land: 3.90 sq mi (10.10 km^{2})
  - Water: 0.035 sq mi (0.09 km^{2})
- Elevation: 89 ft (27 m)

Population (2020)
  - Total: 1,232
  - Density: 320/sq mi (122/km^{2})
- Time zone: UTC-5 (Eastern (EST))
  - Summer (DST): UTC-4 (EDT)
- ZIP code: 04578
- Area code: 207
- FIPS code: 23-87040
- GNIS feature ID: 2377971

Wiscasset is a census-designated place (CDP) comprising the primary settlement in the town of Wiscasset in Lincoln County, Maine, United States. The population was 1,232 at the 2020 census, out of 3,732 people in the entire town. Wiscasset is the county seat of Lincoln County.

== Geography ==
The Wiscasset CDP is located in the east-central part of the town of Wiscasset in western Lincoln County. The village sits on the west side of the tidal Sheepscot River, which forms the boundary with the town of Edgecomb to the east. The CDP extends along the Sheepscot south to Birch Point and north to an unnamed cove downstream from Clark Point. The CDP extends west as far as Ward Brook and north to a powerline near Foye Road.

U.S. Route 1 passes through the center of the village as Main Street, heading east across the Sheepscot River on the Donald E. Davey Bridge into the northern part of Edgecomb. US 1 leads northeast 8 miles (13 km) to Damariscotta and southwest 10 miles (16 km) to Bath. Portland is 44 miles (71 km) to the southwest. Maine State Route 27 enters Wiscasset from the east with US 1, but turns and leads north 17 miles (27 km) to Gardiner and 23 miles (37 km) to Augusta, the state capital. ME 27 splits off US 1 in Edgecomb and leads south to Boothbay Harbor, 13 miles (21 km) from Wiscasset. Maine State Route 218 (Federal Street) leads northeast out of Wiscasset 13 miles (21 km) to Whitefield.

According to the United States Census Bureau, the Wiscasset CDP has a total area of 3.9 square miles (10.2 km^{2}), of which 3.9 square miles (10.1 km^{2}) are land and 0.04 square miles (0.1 km^{2}), or 0.89%, are water. It is home to Wiscasset High School.

== Demographics ==
Historical population
Census	Pop.	Note	%±
2020	1,232		—
U.S. Decennial Census

As of the census of 2000, there were 1,203 people, 532 households, and 319 families residing in the CDP. The population density was 309.8 inhabitants per square mile (119.6/km^{2}). There were 603 housing units at an average density of 155.3 per square mile (60.0/km^{2}). The racial makeup of the CDP was 99.09% White, 0.42% Black or African American, 0.17% Asian, and 0.33% from two or more races. Hispanic or Latino of any race were 0.25% of the population.

There were 532 households, out of which 25.2% had children under the age of 18 living with them, 47.9% were married couples living together, 8.8% had a female householder with no husband present, and 40.0% were non-families. 34.8% of all households were made up of individuals, and 15.2% had someone living alone who was 65 years of age or older. The average household size was 2.24 and the average family size was 2.89.

In the CDP, the population was spread out, with 22.3% under the age of 18, 6.6% from 18 to 24, 23.1% from 25 to 44, 28.8% from 45 to 64, and 19.3% who were 65 years of age or older. The median age was 44 years. For every 100 females, there were 93.7 males. For every 100 females age 18 and over, there were 90.0 males.

The median income for a household in the CDP was $30,341, and the median income for a family was $46,250. Males had a median income of $26,827 versus $25,081 for females. The per capita income for the CDP was $20,043. About 11.7% of families and 15.5% of the population were below the poverty line, including 24.9% of those under age 18 and 16.1% of those age 65 or over.
