= Smithfield, Maine =

Town in Maine, United States

- Town
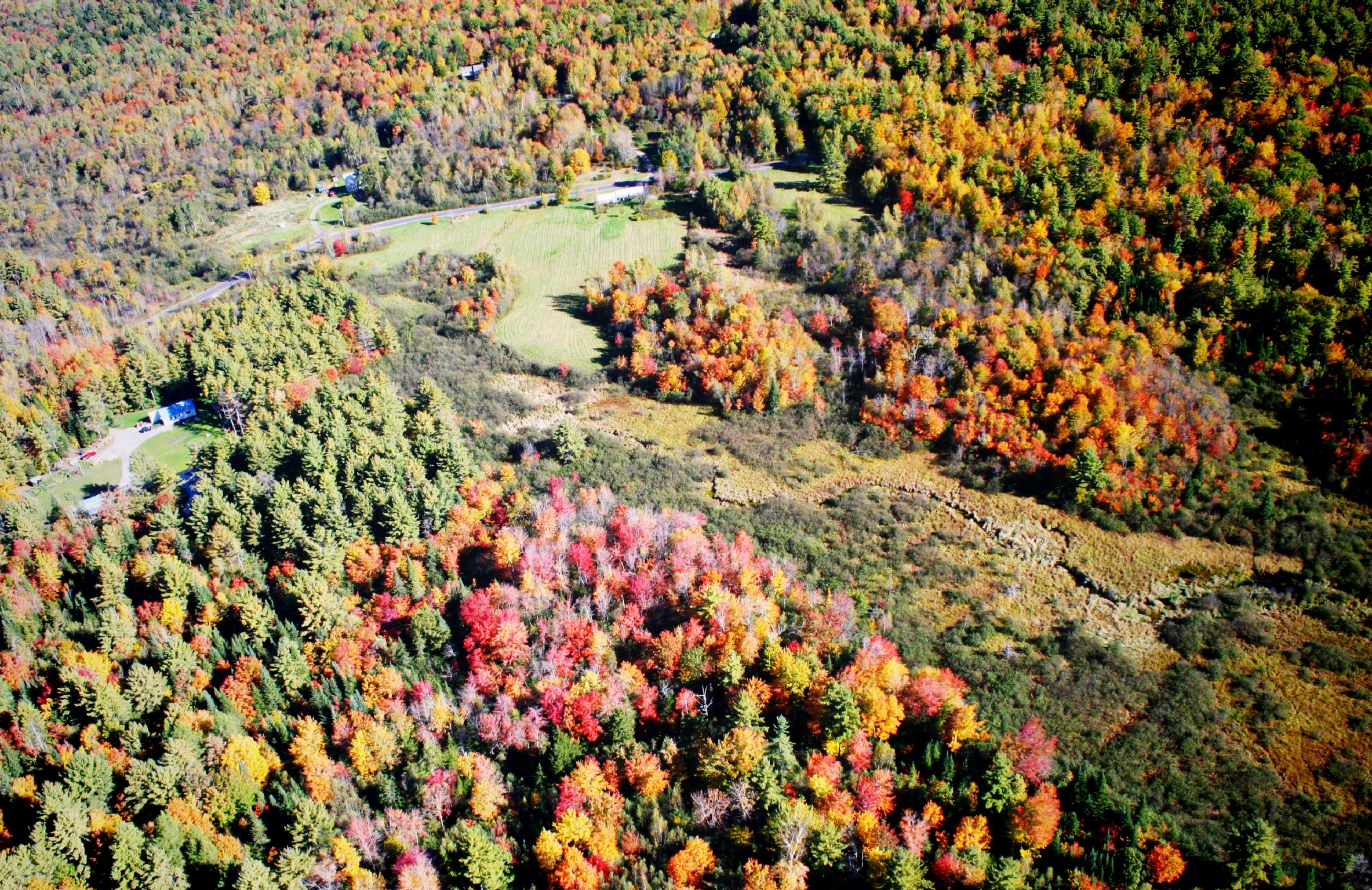
- Smithfield, Maine Aerial View

- Logo

- Location within Maine Location within the United States
- Coordinates: 44°36′59″N 69°47′40″W
- Country: United States
- State: Maine
- County: Somerset

Area
  - Total: 24.76 sq mi (64.13 km^{2})
  - Land: 19.90 sq mi (51.54 km^{2})
  - Water: 4.86 sq mi (12.59 km^{2})
- Elevation: 266 ft (81 m)

Population (2020)
  - Total: 925
  - Density: 46/sq mi (17.9/km^{2})
- Time zone: UTC-5 (Eastern (EST))
  - Summer (DST): UTC-4 (EDT)
- ZIP code: 04978
- Area code: 207
- FIPS code: 23-69155
- GNIS feature ID: 582726
- Website: smithfieldmaine.us

Smithfield is a town in Somerset County, Maine, United States. The population was 925 at the 2020 census. The town was incorporated on February 29, 1840, making it the only town in Maine incorporated on Leap Day. The town was named after the Rev. Henry Smith, an early settler.

== Geography ==
According to the United States Census Bureau, the town has a total area of 24.76 square miles (64.13 km^{2}), of which 19.90 square miles (51.54 km^{2}) is land and 4.86 square miles (12.59 km^{2}) is water.

== Demographics ==
Historical population
Census	Pop.	Note	%±
1840	789		—
1850	873		10.6%
1860	793		−9.2%
1870	704		−11.2%
1880	564		−19.9%
1890	479		−15.1%
1900	449		−6.3%
1910	427		−4.9%
1920	390		−8.7%
1930	374		−4.1%
1940	353		−5.6%
1950	354		0.3%
1960	382		7.9%
1970	527		38.0%
1980	748		41.9%
1990	865		15.6%
2000	930		7.5%
2010	1,033		11.1%
2020	925		−10.5%
U.S. Decennial Census

=== 2010 census ===
As of the census of 2010, there were 1,033 people, 451 households, and 314 families living in the town. The population density was 51.9 inhabitants per square mile (20.0/km^{2}). There were 727 housing units at an average density of 36.5 per square mile (14.1/km^{2}). The racial makeup of the town was 97.6% White, 0.1% African American, 0.2% Native American, 0.5% Asian, 0.1% from other races, and 1.5% from two or more races. Hispanic or Latino of any race were 1.0% of the population.

There were 451 households, of which 23.9% had children under the age of 18 living with them, 57.0% were married couples living together, 6.7% had a female householder with no husband present, 6.0% had a male householder with no wife present, and 30.4% were non-families. 23.1% of all households were made up of individuals, and 7.7% had someone living alone who was 65 years of age or older. The average household size was 2.29 and the average family size was 2.62.

The median age in the town was 49.2 years. 18% of residents were under the age of 18; 3.7% were between the ages of 18 and 24; 22% were from 25 to 44; 39.3% were from 45 to 64; and 16.9% were 65 years of age or older. The gender makeup of the town was 49.2% male and 50.8% female.

=== 2000 census ===
As of the census of 2000, there were 930 people, 372 households, and 284 families living in the town. The population density was 46.8 inhabitants per square mile (18.1/km^{2}). There were 608 housing units at an average density of 30.6 per square mile (11.8/km^{2}). The racial makeup of the town was 98.39% White, 0.11% African American, 0.22% Native American, 0.43% Asian, 0.43% from other races, and 0.43% from two or more races. Hispanic or Latino of any race were 0.97% of the population.

There were 372 households, out of which 31.7% had children under the age of 18 living with them, 65.9% were married couples living together, 7.0% had a female householder with no husband present, and 23.4% were non-families. 17.7% of all households were made up of individuals, and 6.7% had someone living alone who was 65 years of age or older. The average household size was 2.50 and the average family size was 2.84.

In the town, the population was spread out, with 24.3% under the age of 18, 4.1% from 18 to 24, 29.6% from 25 to 44, 28.6% from 45 to 64, and 13.4% who were 65 years of age or older. The median age was 40 years. For every 100 females, there were 100.0 males. For every 100 females age 18 and over, there were 100.0 males.

The median income for a household in the town was $37,045, and the median income for a family was $41,339. Males had a median income of $31,417 versus $22,596 for females. The per capita income for the town was $21,492. About 5.2% of families and 7.8% of the population were below the poverty line, including 14.9% of those under age 18 and 5.3% of those age 65 or over.

== Notable people ==
- C. J. Stevens, author of over thirty books on numerous subjects

== See also ==
- List of towns in Maine
