= Mount Vernon, Maine =

Town in Maine, United States

- Town
- Motto: "Life in a small town USA"
- Location in Kennebec County and the state of Maine
- Coordinates: 44°29′12″N 70°00′56″W
- Country: United States
- State: Maine
- County: Kennebec
- Villages: Mount Vernon; Dunns Corner; West Mount Vernon

Area
  - Total: 43.42 sq mi (112.46 km^{2})
  - Land: 37.90 sq mi (98.16 km^{2})
  - Water: 5.52 sq mi (14.30 km^{2})
- Elevation: 558 ft (170 m)

Population (2020)
  - Total: 1,721
  - Density: 45/sq mi (17.5/km^{2})
- Time zone: UTC-5 (Eastern (EST))
  - Summer (DST): UTC-4 (EDT)
- ZIP code: 04352
- Area code: 207
- FIPS code: 23-47770
- GNIS feature ID: 582612
- Website: Town of Mount Vernon, Maine

Mount Vernon is a town in Kennebec County, Maine, United States. The population was 1,721 at the 2020 census. Mount Vernon is included in the Augusta, Maine micropolitan New England City and Town Area. A popular recreation spot in central Maine, the northern area of Mount Vernon is part of the Belgrade Lakes Region, while the southern area is part of the Winthrop Lakes Region.

== History ==
Mount Vernon was incorporated on June 28, 1792, and was named for George Washington's Virginia estate.

== Geography ==
According to the United States Census Bureau, the town has a total area of 43.42 square miles (112.46 km^{2}), of which 37.90 square miles (98.16 km^{2}) is land and 5.52 square miles (14.30 km^{2}) is water.

== Demographics ==
Historical population
Census	Pop.	Note	%±
1800	740		—
1810	1,098		48.4%
1820	1,293		17.8%
1830	1,439		11.3%
1840	1,475		2.5%
1850	1,479		0.3%
1860	1,464		−1.0%
1870	1,252		−14.5%
1880	1,170		−6.5%
1890	940		−19.7%
1900	906		−3.6%
1910	898		−0.9%
1920	745		−17.0%
1930	755		1.3%
1940	653		−13.5%
1950	653		0.0%
1960	596		−8.7%
1970	680		14.1%
1980	1,021		50.1%
1990	1,362		33.4%
2000	1,524		11.9%
2010	1,640		7.6%
2020	1,721		4.9%
U.S. Decennial Census

=== 2010 census ===
As of the census of 2010, there were 1,640 people, 693 households, and 487 families living in the town. The population density was 43.3 inhabitants per square mile (16.7/km^{2}). There were 1,107 housing units at an average density of 29.2 per square mile (11.3/km^{2}). The racial makeup of the town was 98.2% White, 0.1% African American, 0.4% Native American, 0.1% Asian, 0.1% from other races, and 1.1% from two or more races. Hispanic or Latino of any race were 0.7% of the population.

There were 693 households, of which 27.4% had children under the age of 18 living with them, 56.4% were married couples living together, 8.4% had a female householder with no husband present, 5.5% had a male householder with no wife present, and 29.7% were non-families. 21.9% of all households were made up of individuals, and 8.2% had someone living alone who was 65 years of age or older. The average household size was 2.37 and the average family size was 2.72.

The median age in the town was 45.7 years. 20.1% of residents were under the age of 18; 6.1% were between the ages of 18 and 24; 22.6% were from 25 to 44; 35.9% were from 45 to 64; and 15.4% were 65 years of age or older. The gender makeup of the town was 49.3% male and 50.7% female.

=== 2000 census ===
As of the census of 2000, there were 1,524 people, 603 households, and 449 families living in the town. The population density was 40.2 inhabitants per square mile (15.5/km^{2}). There were 956 housing units at an average density of 25.2 per square mile (9.7/km^{2}). The racial makeup of the town was 97.64% White, 0.26% African American, 0.52% Native American, 0.20% Asian, 0.13% Pacific Islander, 0.26% from other races, and 0.98% from two or more races. Hispanic or Latino of any race were 0.39% of the population.

There were 603 households, out of which 34.7% had children under the age of 18 living with them, 61.2% were married couples living together, 8.6% had a female householder with no husband present, and 25.5% were non-families. 19.7% of all households were made up of individuals, and 6.0% had someone living alone who was 65 years of age or older. The average household size was 2.52 and the average family size was 2.88.

In the town, the population was spread out, with 25.6% under the age of 18, 5.9% from 18 to 24, 28.1% from 25 to 44, 30.5% from 45 to 64, and 9.9% who were 65 years of age or older. The median age was 40 years. For every 100 females, there were 101.1 males. For every 100 females age 18 and over, there were 98.9 males.

The median income for a household in the town was $39,779, and the median income for a family was $44,605. Males had a median income of $31,250 versus $25,795 for females. The per capita income for the town was $19,668. About 4.1% of families and 7.1% of the population were below the poverty line, including 6.7% of those under age 18 and 5.5% of those age 65 or over.

== Education ==
Mount Vernon is part of the Maranacook Area School District in Regional School Unit 38. Dr. Karen Smith is the Superintendent of Schools.

The Maranacook Community School system includes Manchester Elementary School, Mount Vernon Elementary School, Readfield Elementary School, Wayne Elementary School, Maranacook Community Middle School and Maranacook Community High School.

== Notable people ==
- Joseph W. Allen, state legislator
- Joseph Payne, musician
- John H. Rice, U.S. congressman
- Moses Sherburne, politician and Minnesota Supreme Court Justice
- John L. Stevens, U.S. diplomat and Republican Party founder
