= Moses Bailey House =

Historic house in Maine, United States

- U.S. National Register of Historic Places
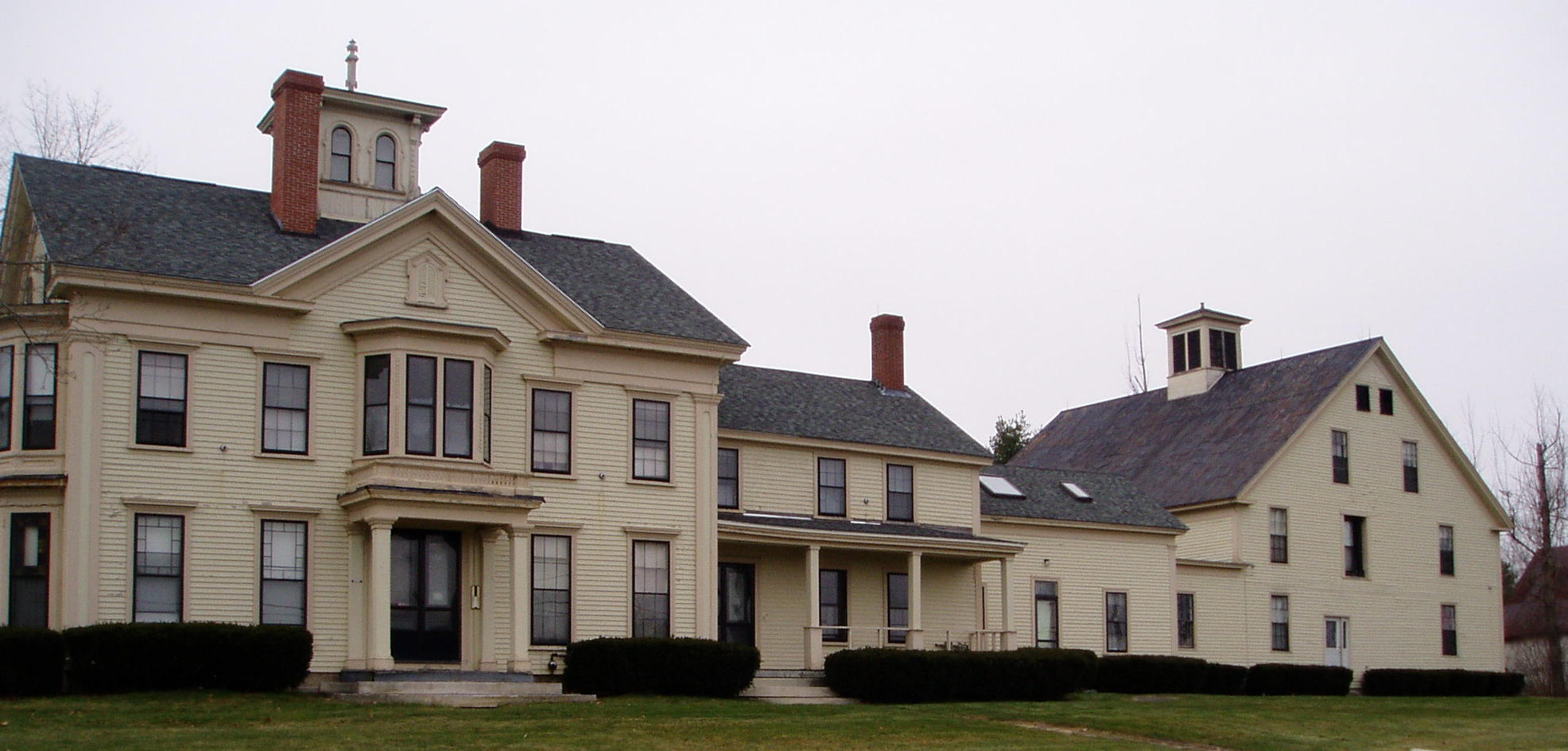

- Location within Maine Location within the United States
- Location: 209 Winthrop Center Rd., Winthrop, Maine
- Coordinates: 44°18′20″N 69°55′24″W
- Area: 0.5 acres (0.20 ha)
- Built: 1853
- Architectural style: Greek Revival, Italianate
- NRHP reference No.: 84000325
- Added to NRHP: November 8, 1984

The Moses Bailey House is a historic residence located at 209 Winthrop Center Road in the Winthrop Center village of East Winthrop, Maine. Built about 1853, with additional Italianate styling added in 1870, it is one of Winthrop's finest surviving mid 19th-century farm houses. It was listed on the National Register of Historic Places in 1984. It has been divided into apartments and is known as Bailey Manor.

== Description and history ==
The Moses Bailey House stands on the west side of Winthrop Center Road (Maine State Route 135), just north of the former Winthrop Center Friends Church. It is a typical New England connected farmstead, with a main house connected to a barn via two ells, all stretched along the road. The main facade of the house faces east, toward the road. The main block is 2 1/2 stories in height, with a side gable roof topped by a square Italianate cupola with rounded-arch windows. The main facade is five bays wide, with corner pilasters and a center entrance sheltered by a porch with square columns, and a polygonal bay window above. A cross-gable rises above that bay, with a small round-arch window at its center. The southern facade has a two-story polygonal bay window on the right side. The first ell is two stories in height, with a single-story shed-roof porch across its front, and the second ell is 1 1/2 stories in height. The attached barn has been converted to residential used.

The house was built about 1853 by Moses Bailey, a prominent local businessman who was an early manufacturer of oil cloth floor coverings. Originally Greek Revival in style, in 1870 Bailey made the alterations the give the house its Italianate character. The house has been divided into apartments.

== See also ==
- National Register of Historic Places listings in Kennebec County, Maine
