= Timothy Foster (settler) =

First settler of Winthrop, Maine

- Born: May 14, 1720; Attleborough, Massachusetts Bay
- Died: April 3, 1785 (aged 64); Winthrop, District of Maine, Massachusetts
- Resting place: Metcalf Cemetery; 44.3230°N 69.9400°W
- Known for: First settler of Winthrop, Maine
- Spouse: Sibboleth Freeman
- Children: 11
- Parents: John Foster (father); Margaret Ware (mother)
- Military service
- Force: Massachusetts Militia
- Rank: Captain
- Units: 7th Company in Joseph North's 2nd Lincoln County Regiment (1776-), William Lithgow's detachment (1778-)
- Conflict: Revolutionary War

Signature
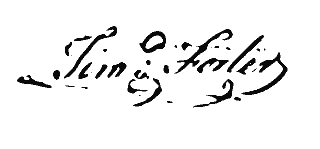

Timothy Foster (May 14, 1720 – April 3, 1785) and his family were the first colonial settlers of Winthrop, Maine, which was then Pondtown Plantation in Massachusetts Bay Colony. He was a captain in the Massachusetts militia during the American Revolutionary War.

== Early life ==
Timothy Foster was born on May 14, 1720, at Attleborough in Massachusetts Bay Colony—the ninth of thirteen children. His mother Margaret Ware (1685–1761) and his father John Foster (1680–1759) were born, respectively, in the Massachusetts Bay towns of Wrentham and Salem. John Foster was a blacksmith and an elected deputy to the Massachusetts General Court.

== First settler of Winthrop, Maine ==
1790 plot map of Pondtown plantation, now Winthrop, Maine.

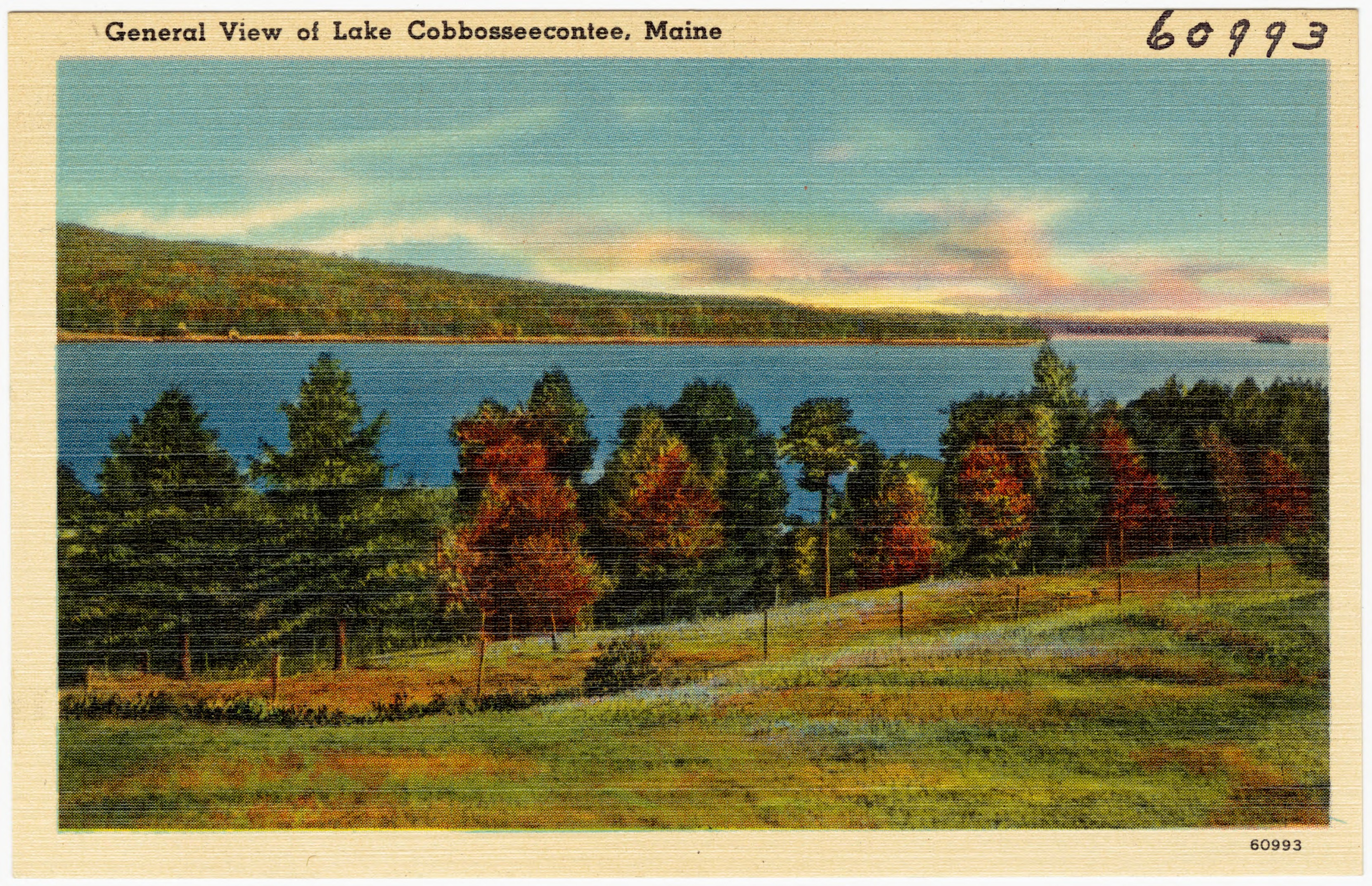
Lake Cobbosseecontee, Maine

Timothy Foster acquired a large tract of forest and meadow in Pondtown Plantation (now Winthrop, Maine) in 1764. The land, which he purchased for £26 (equivalent to about US$6,214 in 2025) from a traveling land speculator, was located on the western shore of Cobbosseecontee Lake.

The name Cobbosseecontee comes from the Abenaki language, meaning "plenty of sturgeon." By the mid-18th century, ongoing conflicts between French and English colonists had severely disrupted Abenaki communities, with many being driven from their traditional lands in southern Maine.

In 1765, Foster and his wife Sibboleth and their ten children relocated from Attleborough to Pondtown, becoming the first European pioneers to settle in the area. In 1766, Foster's 200-acre lot, designated as lot eight, was officially recorded in a colonial deed that required him to construct a house, cultivate and till at least five acres of land, and reside on the premises. The first frame house in Pondtown was constructed by the Fosters in 1769. The town of Winthrop was incorporated in 1771, with Timothy Foster being elected to its inaugural board of selectmen.

== Military service ==
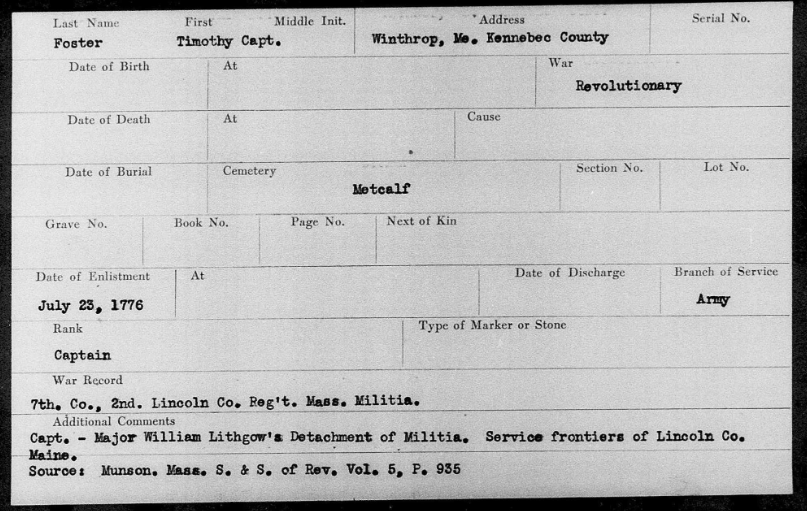
Maine Veteran Cemetery/Service Record index card for Captain Timothy Foster.

The town of Winthrop petitioned the Massachusetts General Court in January of 1773 with grievances against the Parliament of the United Kingdom. Two years later Timothy Foster was commissioned an ensign in the local militia. On July 23, 1776, Foster was made a captain of the 7th Company in Colonel Joseph North's 2nd Lincoln County Regiment of the Massachusetts Militia and, in the same year, Foster's company was at Fort Ticonderoga in New York. From 1778 Foster was a captain in Major William Lithgow's detachment, which in 1779 defended Lincoln County from British attack after the defeat of American naval forces in the Penobscot Expedition at Penobscot Bay.

== Family ==
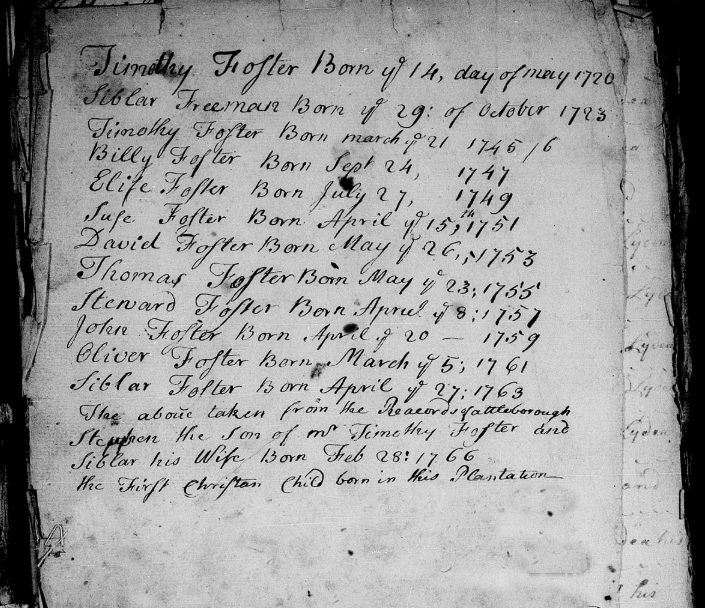
Page from the Winthrop, Maine Vital Records (1720–1821), showing the family record of Timothy Foster

Timothy Foster married Sibboleth (Note: Her name was sometimes shortened to Sible, Sibler, Sybilla, Sebella, and Sibyl.) Freeman (1723–1813) on June 23, 1743, in Attleborough. Their children were Timothy Foster Jr., b. 1745; Bela (Billy) Foster, b. 1747; Eliphalet Foster b. 1749; Susan Foster, b. 1751; David Foster, b. 1753; Thomas Foster, b. 1755; Stuart Foster, b. 1757; John Foster, b. 1759; Oliver Foster, b. 1761; Sibler Foster, b. 1763; and Stephen Foster, b. 1766. All of their children were born in Attleborough except their last child, Stephen, who was the first child born to settlers in Winthrop. Eight of their sons served in the American Revolutionary War.

== Death and legacy ==
Timothy Foster suffered a skull fracture and lost consciousness on April 1, 1785, after being hit by a tree limb. His son Stuart Foster and two neighbors walked to Falmouth, Maine, for a surgeon. The surgeon could not return with them, but he gave them a trephine—a saw to bore a hole in Foster's skull. Unfortunately, the men were unable to return in time to save him, and he died on April 3, 1785. According to one account they were able to briefly revive him:

On the return of the son the indented part of the skull was raised, and Capt. Foster roused up and spoke rationally. But so long a time had elapsed, the inflammation had proceeded so far that he died. His remains were interred near where Dea. Metcalf lived.

According to the Veteran's Cemetery Records from the Maine State Archives, Foster is buried at Metcalf Cemetery (44.3230°N 69.9400°W) near today's Metcalf Road and Bearce Road in Winthrop.

On the site of Foster's original home lot his sons constructed a new house for their widowed mother, and it remains standing to this day. Near the site, in 1917, the Mary Kelton Dummer/Patience Stanley Chapter of the Daughters of the American Revolution placed a bronze memorial plaque on a boulder on South Road near Birchwood Lane (44.304549°N 69.914940°W) that marks the site. The inscription is:

NEAR THIS SITE
STOOD IN 1765
THE FIRST HOUSE IN WINTHROP
THEN CALLED POND TOWN
BUILT BY TIMOTHY FOSTER
