= Fillebrown =

Fillebrown is a surname. Notable people with the surname include:

- Charlotte Ann Fillebrown Jerauld (1820–1845), American poet and story writer
- Thomas Fillebrown (1836–1908), American dentist
