= Maranacook Lake =

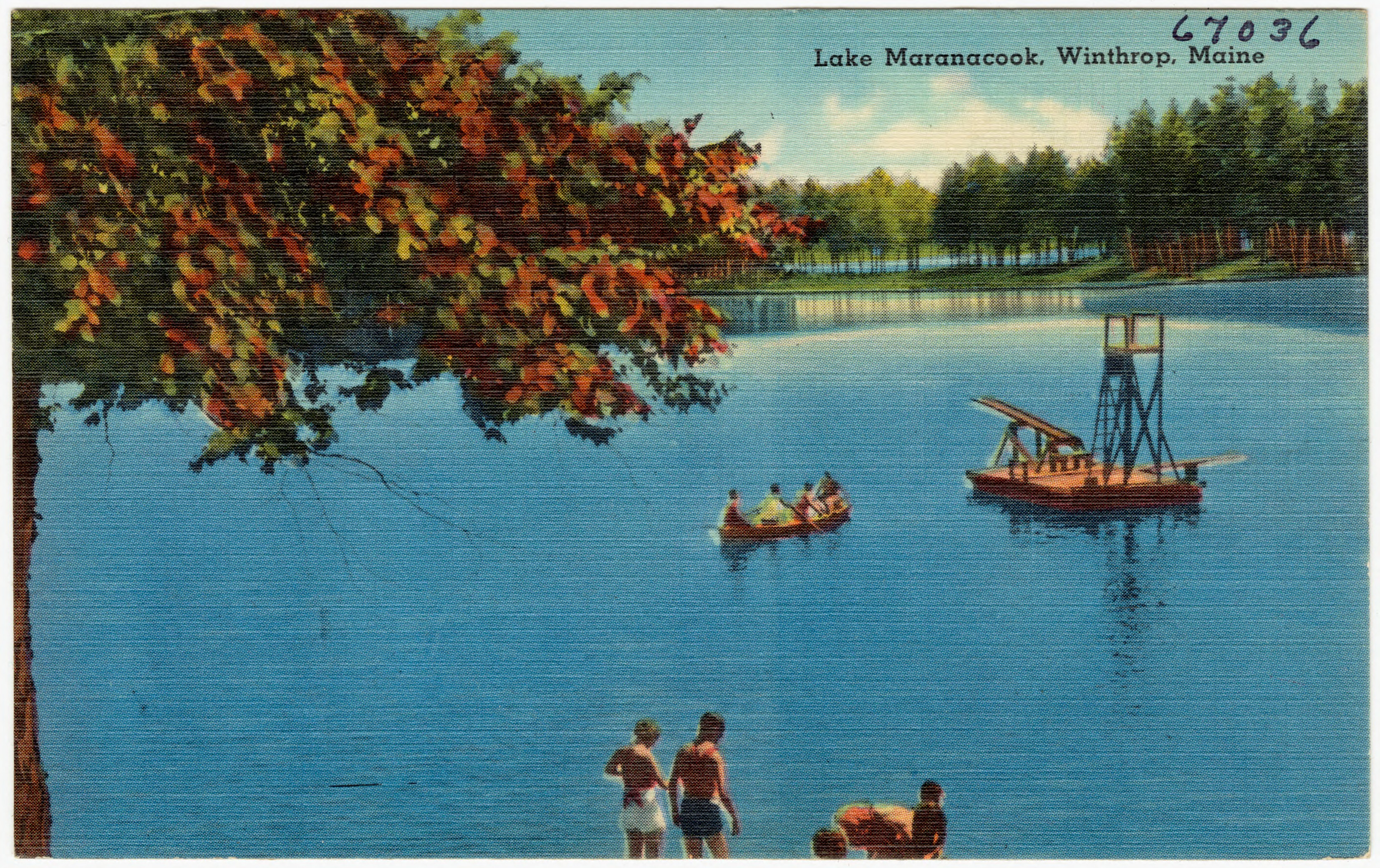

- Location within Maine Location within the United States
- Location: Kennebec County, Maine
- Coordinates: 44°20′44″N 69°57′23″W
- Lake type: Mesotrophicic, reservoir
- Primary inflows: Tingley Brook, Beaver Brook, Roseanne Brook, Dead Stream
- Primary outflows: Annabessacook Lake, Cobbosseecontee Lake, Cobbosseecontee Stream, Kennebec River
- Basin countries: United States
- Surface area: 1,673 acres (677 ha)
- Average depth: 30 ft (9.1 m)
- Max. depth: 118 ft (36 m)
- Water volume: 48,020 acre⋅ft (59,230,000 m^{3})
- Surface elevation: 374 ft (114 m)
- Settlements: Readfield and Winthrop

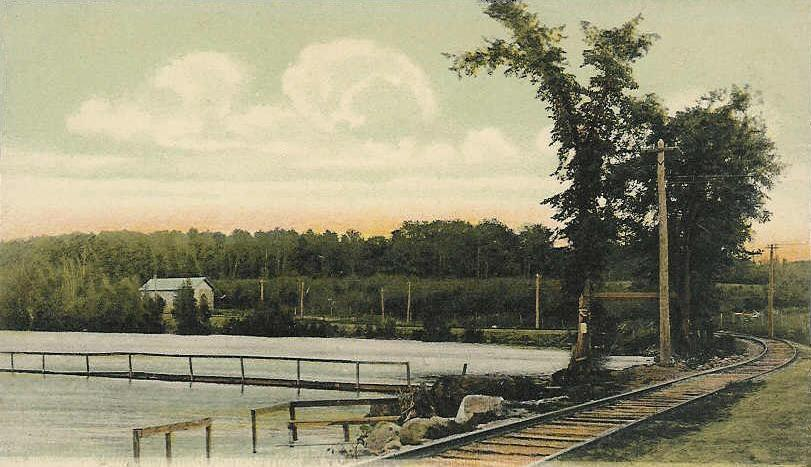
Maranacook Lake from Green Street, Winthrop c. 1905

Maranacook Lake is a lake in Kennebec County, Maine located in the towns of Readfield and Winthrop. The lake covers 1,673 acres (677 ha) with a maximum depth of 118 feet (36 m) and a mean depth of 30 feet (9.1 m). It is one of the major bodies of water in the Winthrop Lakes Region.

== Water supply ==
Maranacook Lake serves as the secondary drinking water supply for Winthrop, Maine. The area around Maranacook Lake that is not developed is mainly forest and fairly level ground used for agriculture. Maranacook Lake is fed primarily by four perennial streams: Tingley Brook from the northeast, Beaver Brook from the east, Roseanne Brook from the west, and Dead Stream from the northwest. Dead Stream is the main outlet from Torsey Pond to Maranacook Lake's west. Annabessacook Lake is the main outlet, but the lake also feeds Cobbosseecontee Lake and Cobbosseecontee Stream, as well as the Kennebec River.

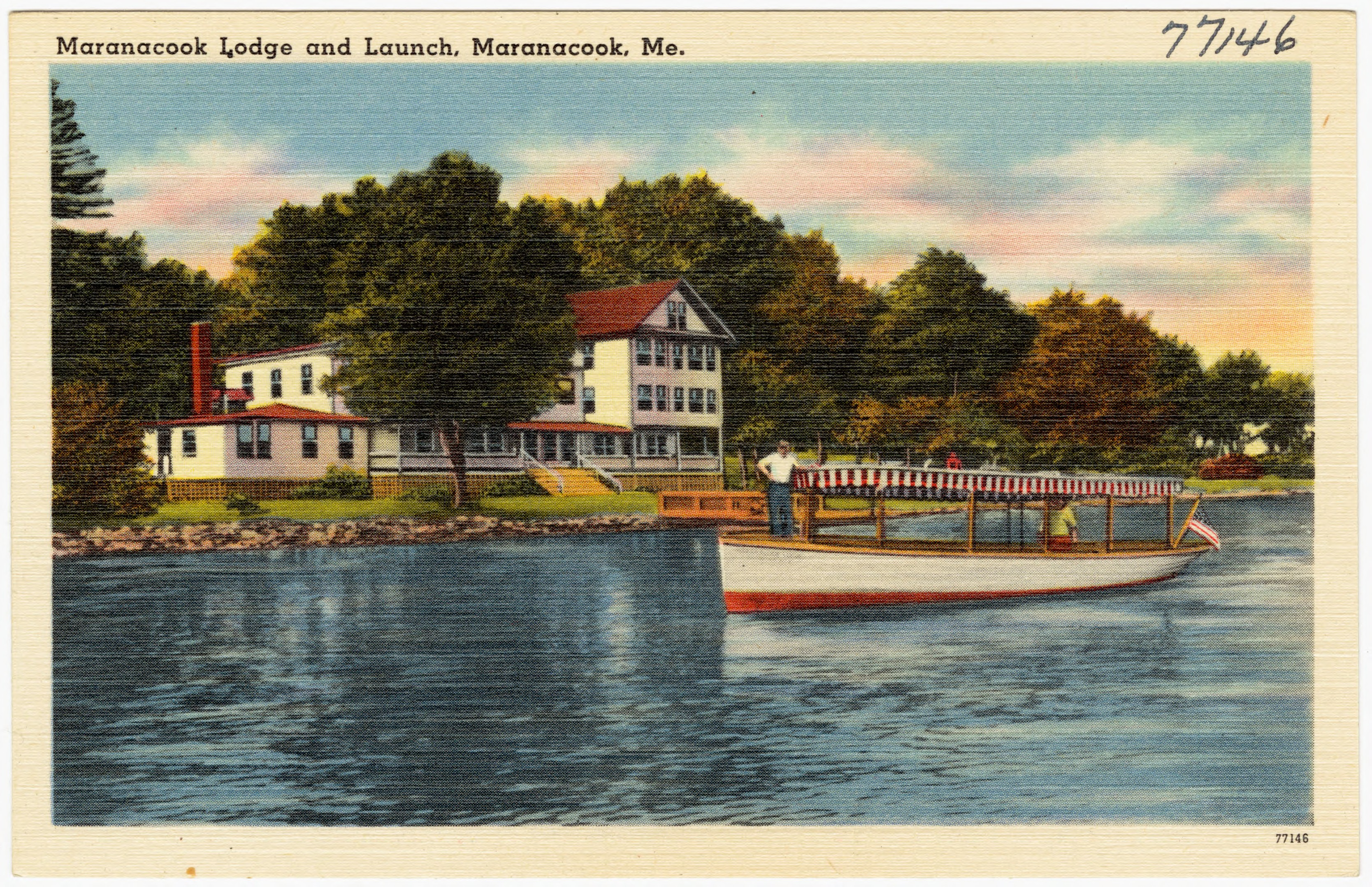
Maranacook Lodge and launch

== Recreation ==
A popular and historic recreation area and tourist attraction, Maranacook is heavily developed with many summer homes, rental cabins, and year-round residences. Known as one of the cleanest bodies of water in Maine, the lake belongs to the Cobbossee Watershed, and is monitored by the Maranacook Lake Association. The North Basin in Readfield is roughly 700 acres (280 ha) and shallow, with a homothermous quality. The roughly 1,000 acres (400 ha) South Basin in Winthrop is deeper and colder. Maranacook Lake Upper Dam is a recent addition to the area. Constructed in 1995, the concrete dam is found at the southeastern tail of the lake in Winthrop. The dam's creation has helped regulate water levels as well as in associated local bodies of water, and it has slowed erosion on the shores of the lake.

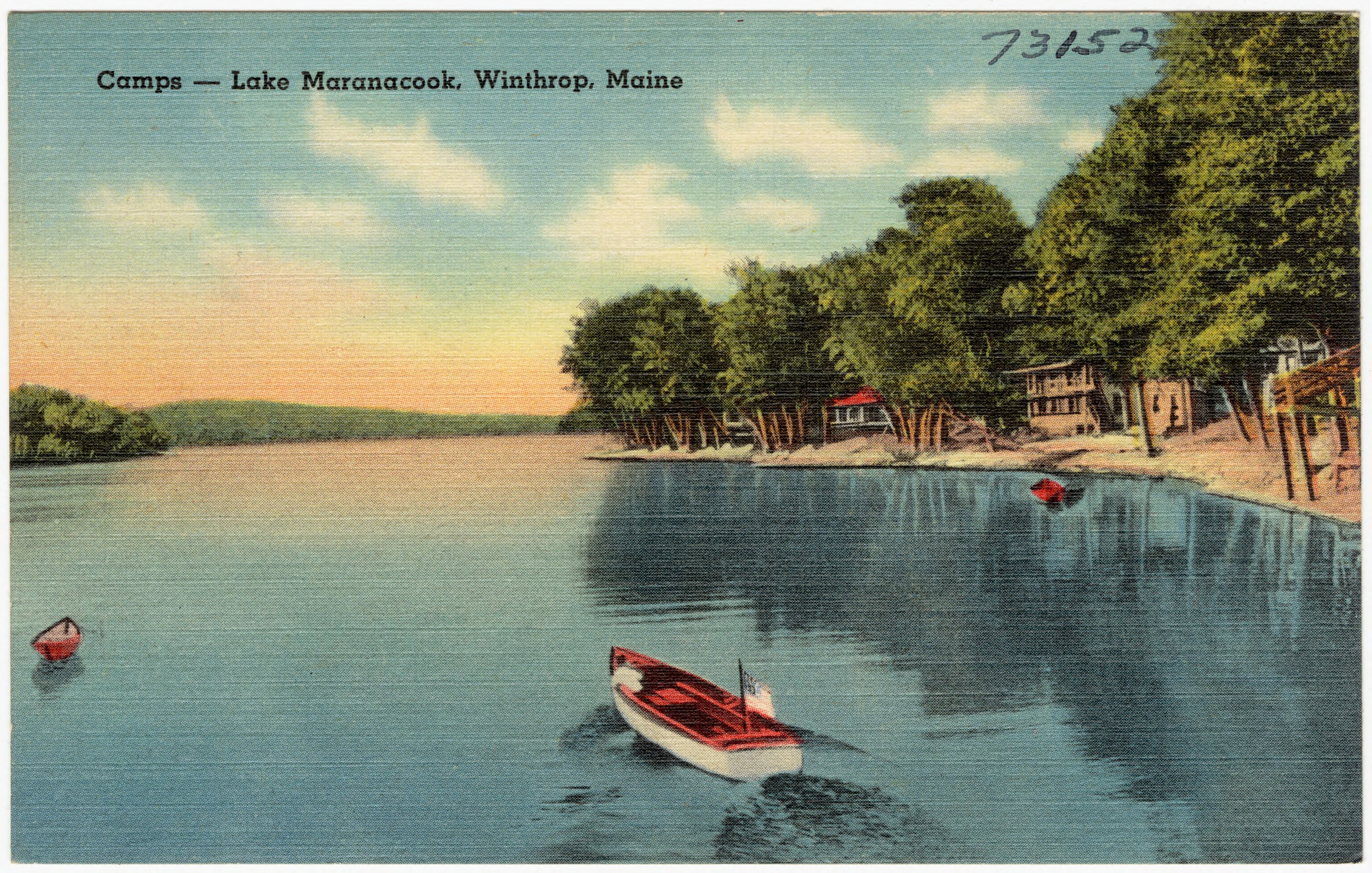
Camps on the lake

=== Fishing ===
The lake is known for its populations of smallmouth, largemouth bass, and smelt.

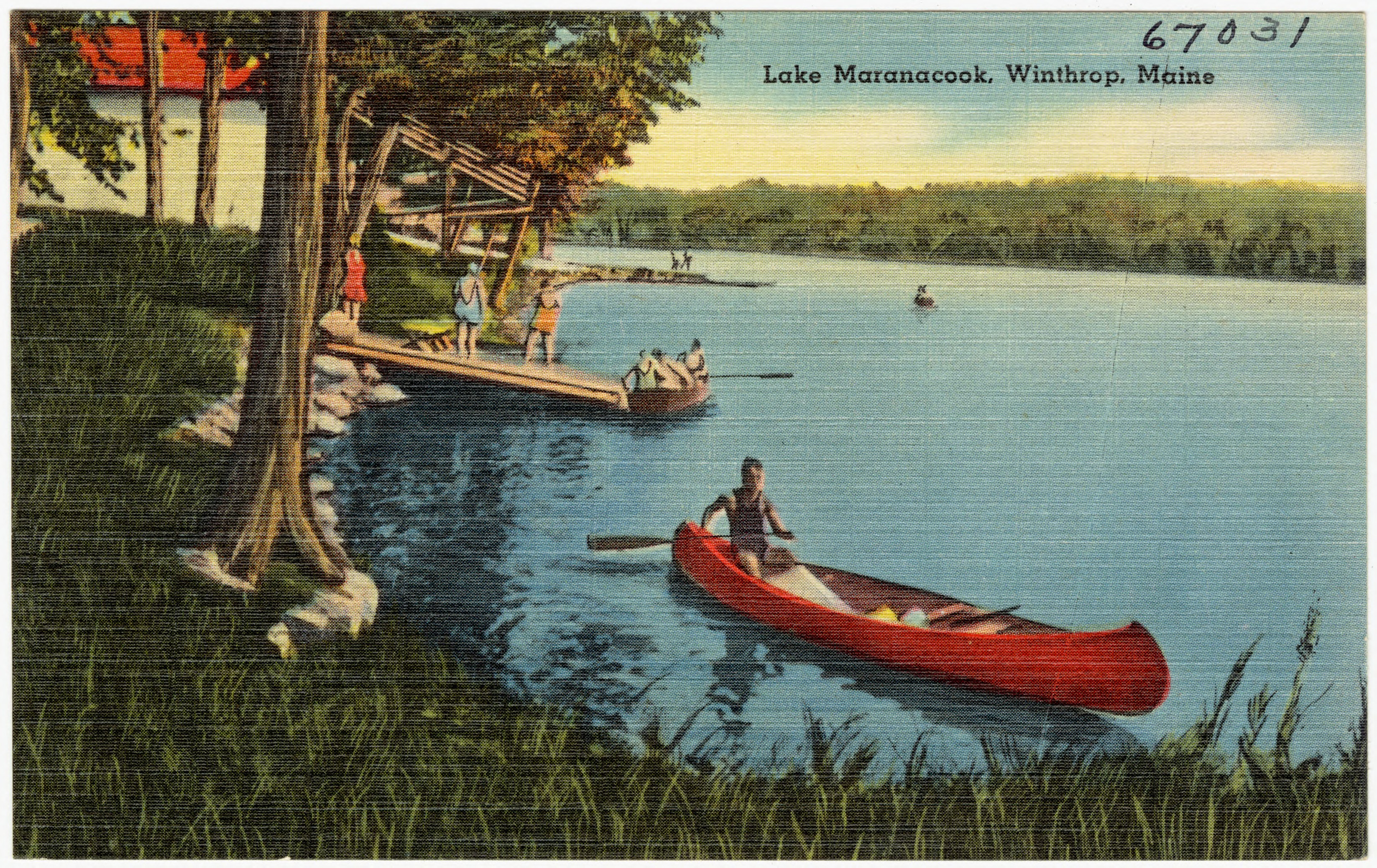
Paddlers on the lake

== Camp ==
The lake is home to the popular day camp in Readfield, Camp KV.
