= Narrows Pond =

Lakes in Kennebec County, Maine, United States

- Location within Maine Location within the United States
- Location: Kennebec County, Maine
- Coordinates: 44°17′50″N 69°57′0″W
- Catchment area: 8.5 square miles (22 km^{2})
- Basin countries: United States
- Max. depth: 106 feet (32 m) (Lower)
- Water volume: 10,793 acre⋅ft (13,313,000 m^{3}) (combined)
- Surface elevation: 172 feet (52 m) (both)

Narrows Pond is actually two small twin lakes in Winthrop, Maine. They are Upper and Lower Narrows Pond, and are divided by a very narrow isthmus, hence the name. The isthmus is traversed by Narrows Pond Road, and a culvert connects the two lakes. People in canoes or kayaks can travel between the two lakes, though only by carrying watercraft over the causeway and road.

Upper Narrows Pond covers 222 acres (90 ha) with a mean depth of 25 feet (7.6 m) and a maximum depth of 59 feet (18 m). The volume of Upper Narrows is 4,953 acre-feet (6,109,000 m^{3}).

Both lakes' shores are lined with cottages, most of them summer residences. Seaplanes are allowed to land and take off from the Upper Pond. A United Methodist summer camp, Camp Mechuwana, is located on the Lower Pond.
