= Winthrop Mills Company =

- U.S. National Register of Historic Places
- U.S. Historic district
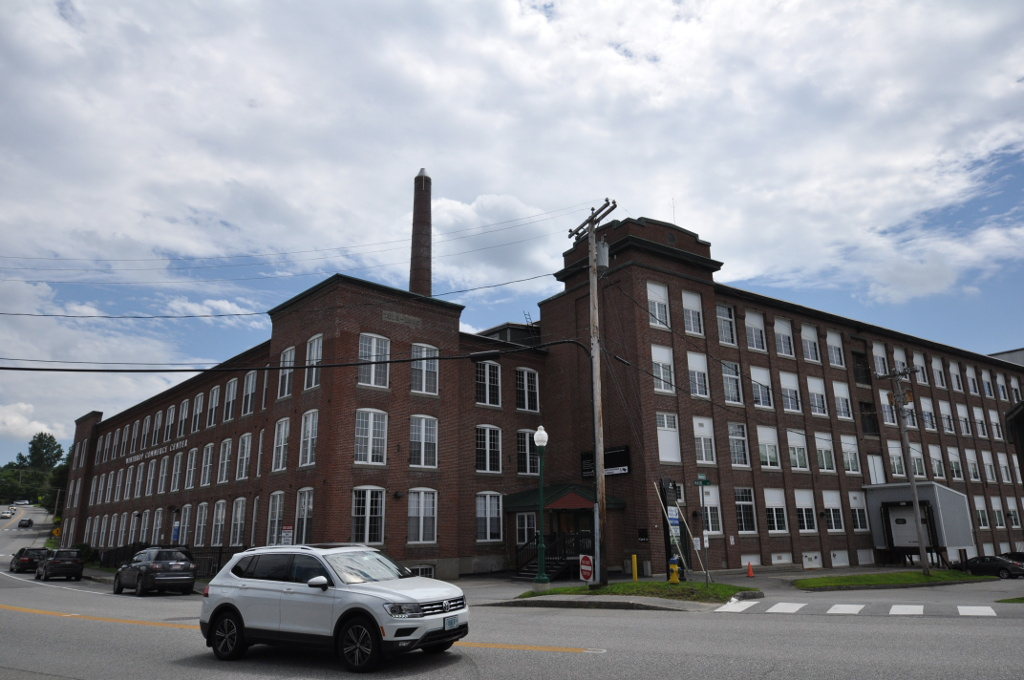

- Location within Maine Location within the United States
- Location: 149-151 Main St., Winthrop, Maine
- Coordinates: 44°18′26″N 69°58′17″W
- Area: 4.5 acres (1.8 ha)
- Built: 1882
- NRHP reference No.: 14000835
- Added to NRHP: October 8, 2014

The Winthrop Mills Company is a historic textile mill complex at 149-151 Main Street in Winthrop, Maine. Developed mainly between the late 19th and mid-20th centuries, it was the nation's largest manufacturer of woolen blankets for many years, and a major local employer for about 150 years. It was listed on the National Register of Historic Places in 2014.

== Description and History ==
The former Winthrop Mills Company complex is located in the town center of Winthrop, on the banks of Maranacook Stream, between the Maranacook and Anabessacook Lakes. The complex includes five buildings, as well as a power canal and dam that first went into operation in 1866. Four of the five buildings are of brick construction, between three and five stories in height, with later additions of various sizes and materials. These buildings were built using slow-burning construction methods typically used for mill construction of the late 19th and early 20th centuries. The mill office building is a single-story brick structure located near Main Street.

Textile production began in Winthrop in the early 19th century, with the construction of a woolen and cotton mill in 1814. The Winthrop Mills Company was founded in 1866 by investors from Boston, Massachusetts, and operated on this site until 1938, when the business was purchased by the Wilton Woolen Company. It continued to operate under the Winthrop Mills name, producing both cotton and wool products until 1954. It was then sold, and operated as the Carleton Woolen Company, producing exclusively woolens until 2002, when it closed. It was one of the last woolen mills to operate in the state.

== See also ==
- National Register of Historic Places listings in Kennebec County, Maine

== Archives and records ==
- Winthrop Mills Records at Baker Library Special Collections, Harvard Business School.
