= Winthrop, Maine =

- Town
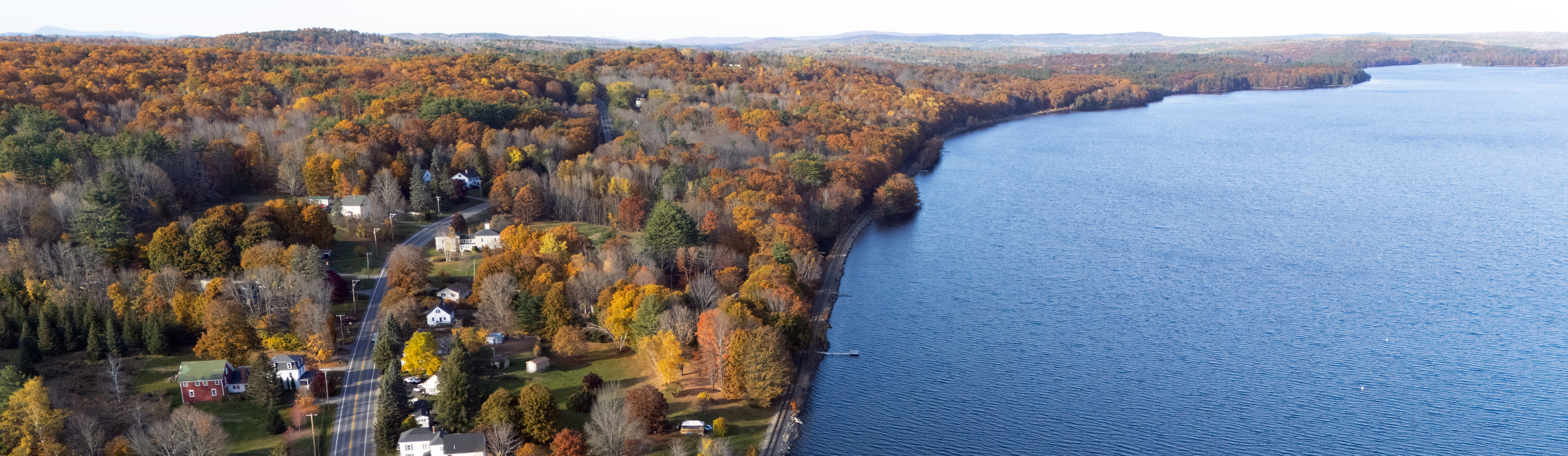
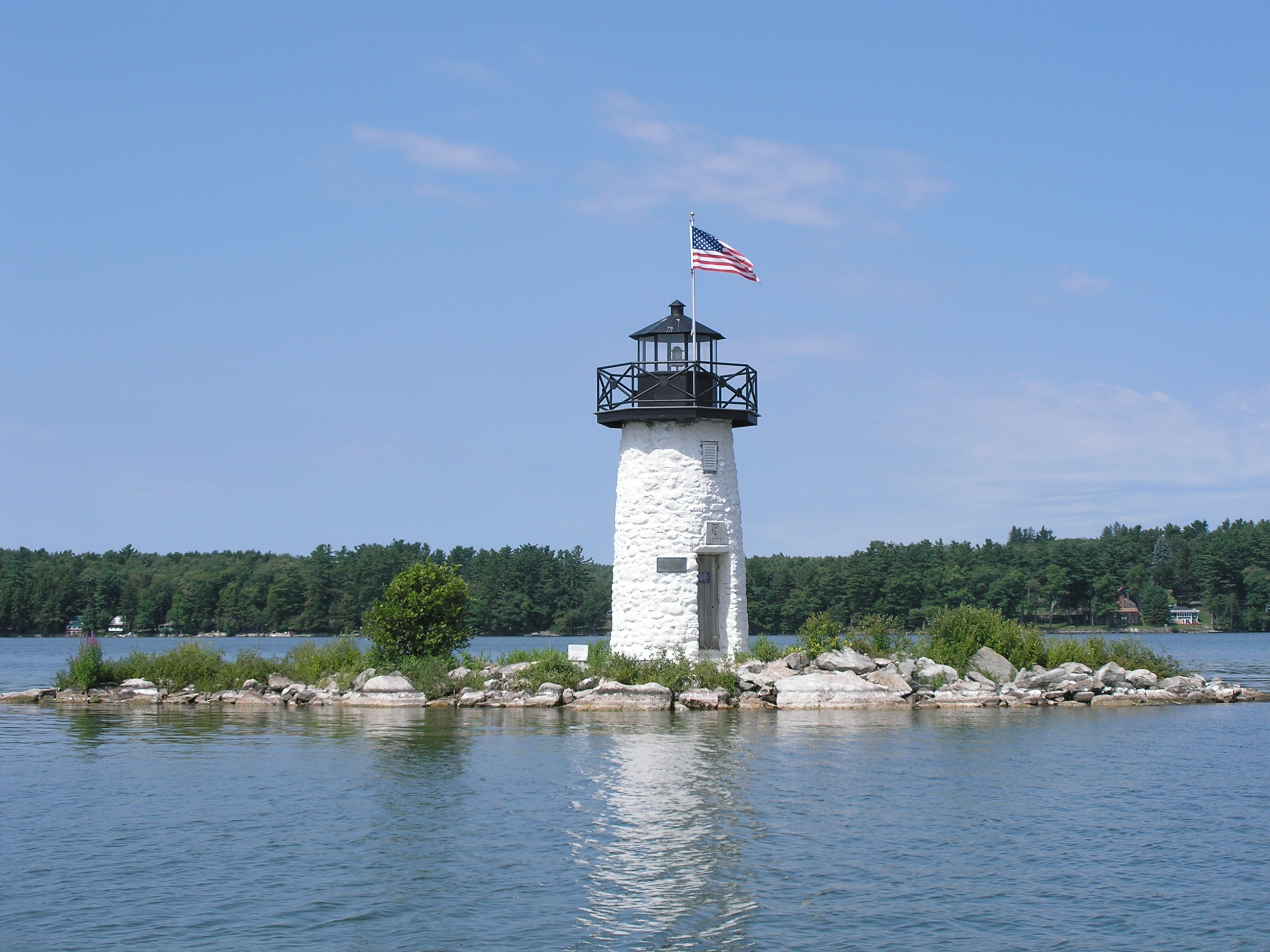
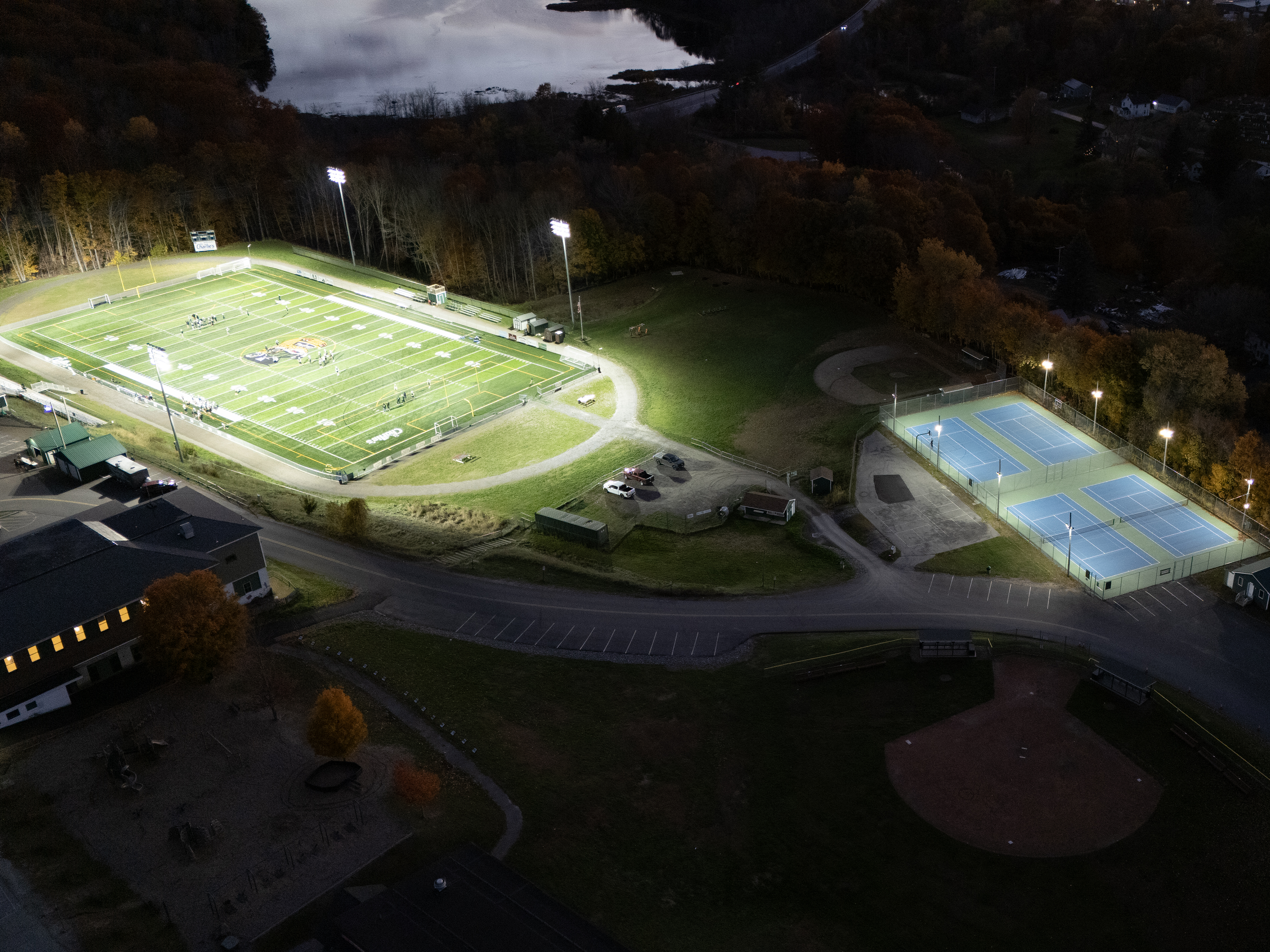
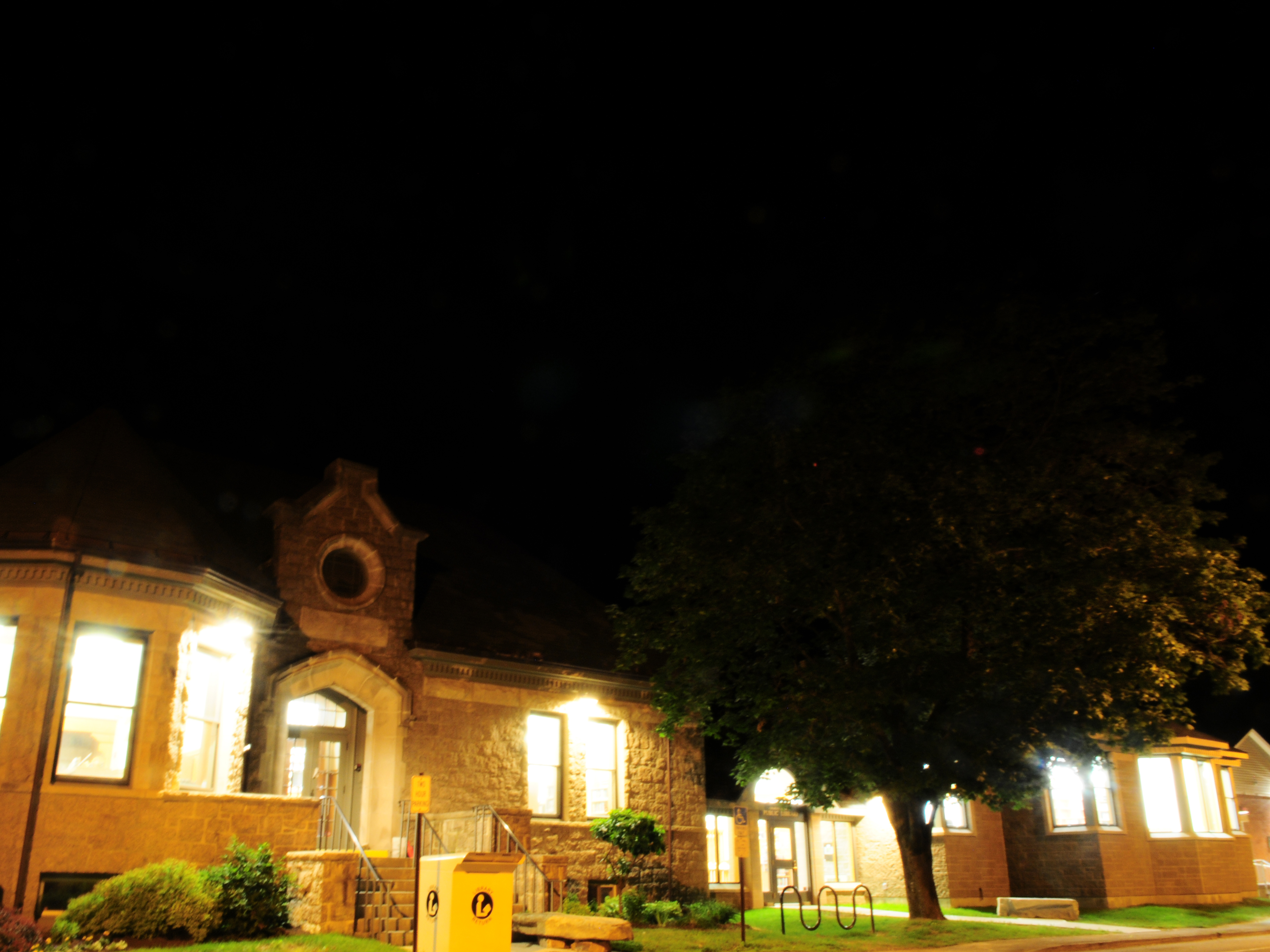
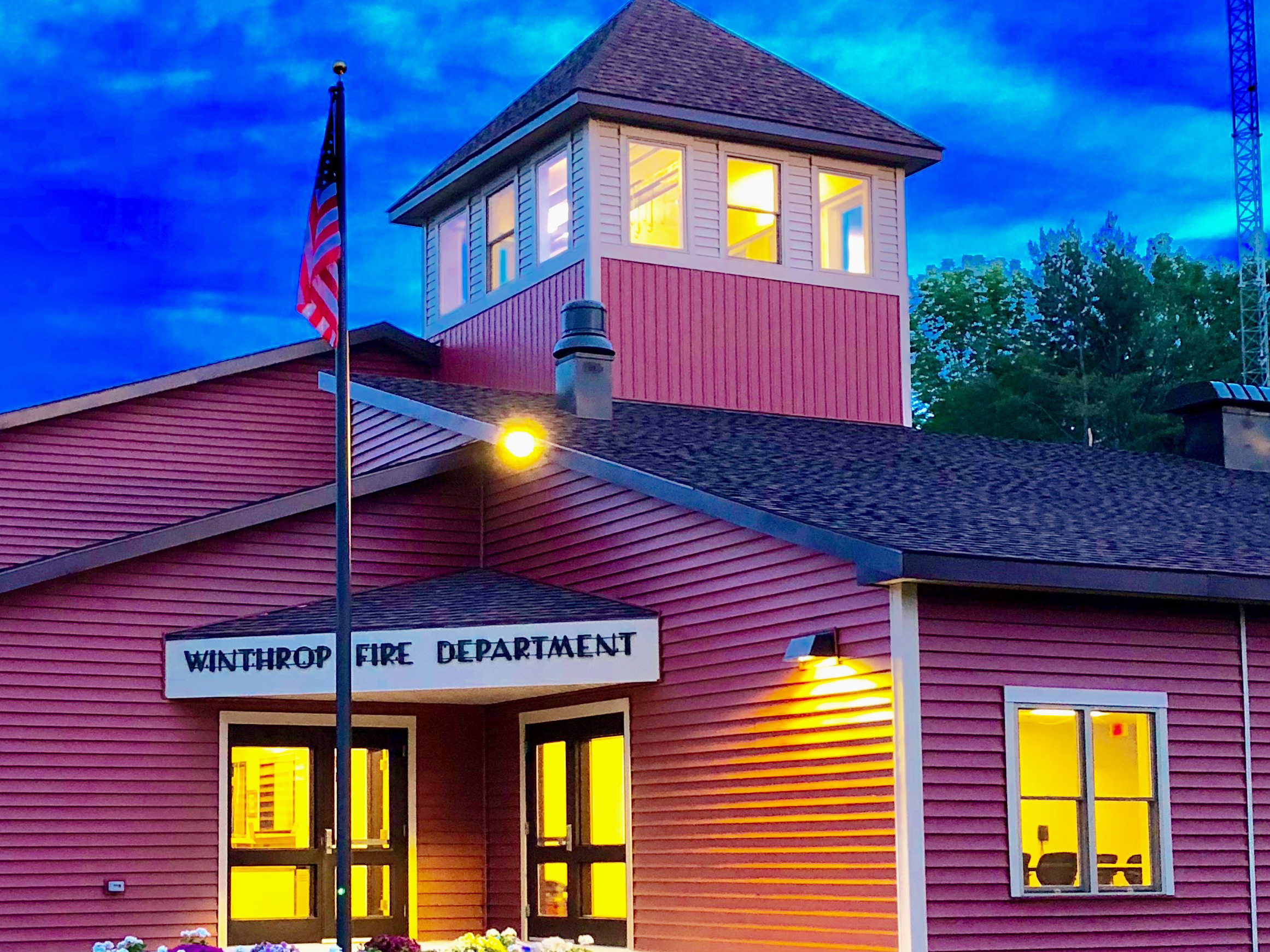
- Shoreline of Maranacook Lake in autumn Lighthouse on Cobbossee Lake Winthrop Athletic Complex C.M. Bailey Public Library Winthrop Fire Department

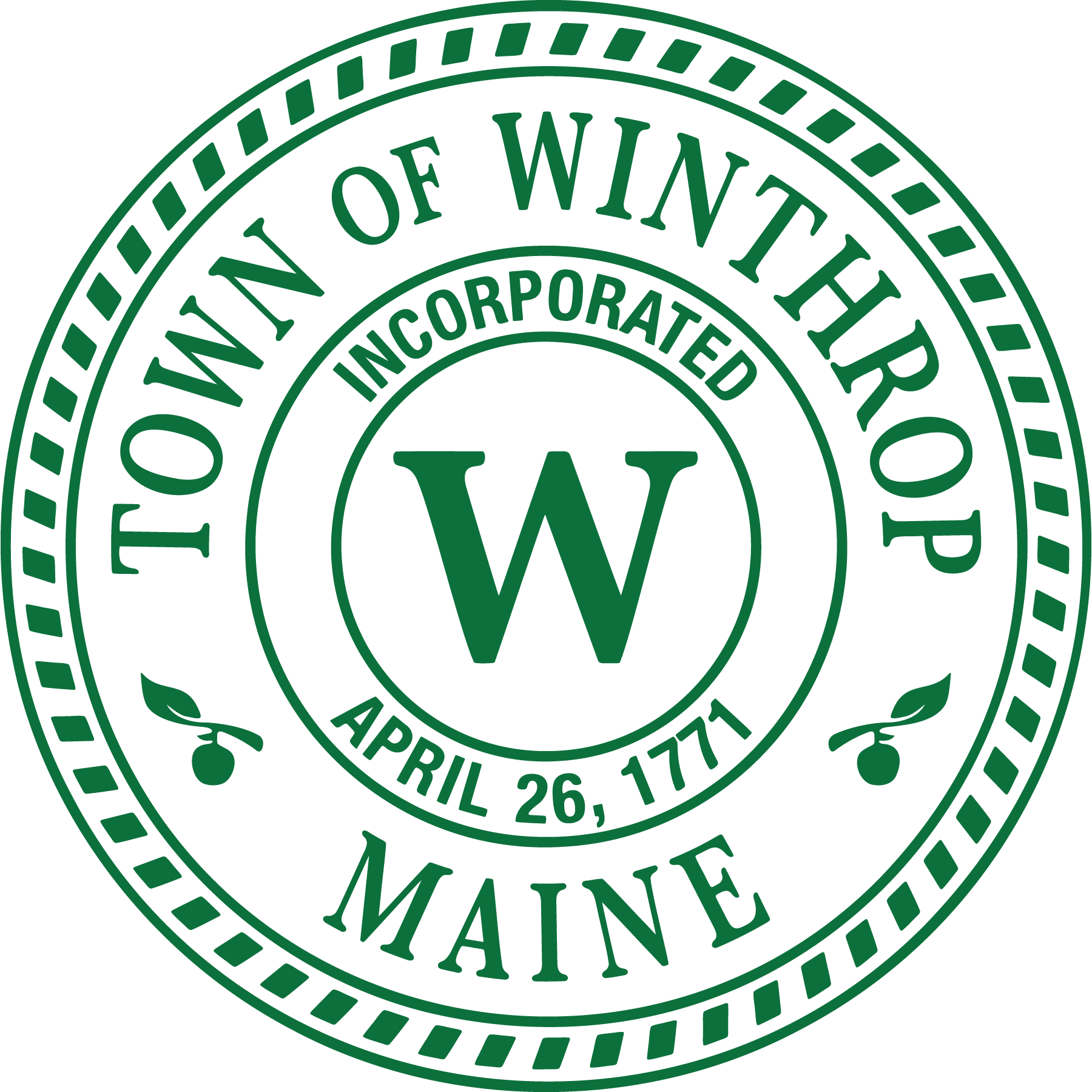
- Seal Logo
- Nicknames: Pond Town, Apple Valley
- Location in Kennebec County and the state of Maine.
- Coordinates: 44°18′42″N 69°59′24″W
- Country: United States
- State: Maine
- County: Kennebec
- Settled: 1765
- Incorporated: 1771
- Villages: Winthrop; East Winthrop; Sturtevant Hill; Winthrop Center

Government
  - Type: Council-Manager

Area
  - Total: 37.90 sq mi (98.16 km^{2})
  - Land: 31.22 sq mi (80.86 km^{2})
  - Water: 6.68 sq mi (17.30 km^{2})
- Elevation: 308 ft (94 m)

Population (2020)
  - Total: 6,121
  - Density: 196/sq mi (75.7/km^{2})
- Time zone: UTC-5 (Eastern (EST))
  - Summer (DST): UTC-4 (EDT)
- ZIP code(s): 04364
- Area code: 207
- GNIS feature ID: 582824
- Website: www.winthropmaine.gov

Winthrop is a town in Kennebec County, Maine, United States. Winthrop is included in the Lewiston-Auburn, Maine metropolitan New England City and Town Area. The population was 6,121 at the 2020 census. Winthrop's population, however, approximately doubles during the summer months as part-year residents return to seasonal camps located on the shores of Winthrop's Lakes and Ponds. A recreational area located among lakes, the town includes the villages of Winthrop and East Winthrop, and is the center of the Winthrop Lakes Region. Winthrop is also included in the Augusta, Maine Micropolitan New England City and Town Area.

The town is defined by several significant bodies of water, including Maranacook Lake, Annabessacook Lake, Cobbossee Lake, and the Narrows (Upper and Lower Ponds). These lakes and ponds are central to the town's identity and offer numerous recreational opportunities such as boating, fishing, and swimming, with the Ladies Delight Lighthouse on Cobbossee Lake being a unique landmark.

First called Pondtown for its lakes and ponds, it was settled by Timothy Foster in 1765. On April 26, 1771, Pondtown Plantation was incorporated by the Massachusetts General Court as Winthrop, named for the first colonial governor of Massachusetts, John Winthrop. Readfield was set off and incorporated in 1791. The surface of the town is uneven, but with good land that yielded hay, grain and apples. Winthrop became noted for its orchards and cattle.

At the outlet of Maranacook Lake into Annabessacook Lake, John Chandler built a sawmill in 1768, and then added a gristmill. Other industries followed, including a fulling mill, tannery and blacksmith shop. The Winthrop Woolen & Cotton Manufactory was incorporated in 1809, and in 1814 went into operation. By 1886, the town had a sawmill which manufactured about 200,000 feet of lumber every year, two oil cloth factories, a sash and blind factory, and a foundry and machine shop. The Maine Central Railroad opened to the village, carrying freight and tourists. Winthrop and its lakes developed into a summer resort, which it remains today.

== Villages and neighborhoods ==
Winthrop has historically referred to its regions by directional names. Other than Winthrop Village and East Winthrop, their boundaries are not firmly established and tend to vary from person to person. Winthrop has several villages and areas that can be classified as neighborhoods. Some of them are:

- Winthrop is the main, central area, often called The Village. It encompasses roughly the area around northern Annabessacook Lake to southern Marancook Lake. This is the central, downtown of Winthrop, featuring shops, eateries, businesses, a public beach and library. Just over 43% of Winthrop's population live in Winthrop Village.
- North Area (Maranacook) loops around Maranacook Lake, and includes the popular Memorial Drive, often referred to as The Drive. The area features excellent public landings, and is heavily developed with many summer homes, year-round residences, and rental cabins.
- East Winthrop is located just west of Manchester and south of Readfield, borders most of Cobbosseecontee Lake, and all of Little Cobbosseecontee, Upper & Lower Narrows. It has a separate post office and ZIP code (04343) from the rest of Winthrop (04364), although this serves only mail delivered to post office boxes in the East Winthrop Post Office. The area has magnificent views of the Cobbosseecontee bodies of water.
- South Area (Annabessacook) borders Monmouth and loops around Annabessacook Lake. The area includes popular lakeside tourist attractions, including the 65 acre Augusta West Resort, and the 25 acre historic Annabessacook Farm Bed & Breakfast.
- West Area (Mt. Pisgah area) encompasses roughly the area from Wilson Pond up to Berry Pond. The southern part of this area is home to Mount Pisgah. This is a popular fishing area, as Wilson Pond abounds with natural populations of warm-water species, especially bass and perch.
- Winthrop Center is a small village within East Winthrop located along ME 135, west of Cobbossee Lake near Robbins Point. The village includes the Moses Bailey House and the YMCA Camp of Maine.
- Sturtevant Hill is a popular residential neighborhood just west of ME 41 and north of ME 133.

== Geography ==
Winthrop is a commuter town and suburb of both Lewiston–Auburn and Augusta. It is located just 3 miles west of Maine's capital city, Augusta, and 15 miles east of Lewiston. Nearly 10% of Winthrop's housing is seasonal. The downtown is situated between Maranacook and Annabessacook Lake.

According to the United States Census Bureau, the town has a total area of 37.90 square miles (98.16 km^{2}), of which 31.22 square miles (80.86 km^{2}) is land and 6.68 square miles (17.30 km^{2}) is water. Winthrop is drained by Hoyt Brook.

The town is crossed by U. S. Route 202 and state routes 11, 41, 100, 133 and 135. It is bordered by the towns of Manchester to the east, Monmouth to the south, Wayne to the west, and Readfield to the north.

Winthrop is also home to Mt. Pisgah (pronounced pis-guh, from the Hebrew word for summit or lookout), which is 807 ft above sea level and home to the Maine Fire Services watch tower that was in service from 1949 to 1992, when air patrols rendered it obsolete. The tower still stands to this day and is accessible by a hiking trail.

=== Adjacent municipalities ===
- Readfield (north)
- Manchester (east)
- West Gardiner (southeast)
- Monmouth (south)
- Wayne (west)

=== Climate ===
Winthrop's climate is classified as humid continental climate (Köppen Dfa), characterized by pronounced seasonal variation. The town endures extended winters with cold temperatures and frequent snowfall, contrasted by warm to hot summers that often bring higher humidity. The intervening spring and autumn seasons are comparatively brief and noted for cooler, brisk weather. Rainfall is distributed fairly evenly across the year, with winter precipitation commonly falling as snow.

== Demographics ==
Historical population
Census	Pop.	Note	%±
1790	1,226		—
1800	1,219		−0.6%
1810	1,444		18.5%
1820	1,619		12.1%
1830	1,888		16.6%
1840	1,915		1.4%
1850	2,154		12.5%
1860	2,338		8.5%
1870	2,229		−4.7%
1880	2,146		−3.7%
1890	2,111		−1.6%
1900	2,088		−1.1%
1910	2,114		1.2%
1920	1,902		−10.0%
1930	2,334		22.7%
1940	2,508		7.5%
1950	3,026		20.7%
1960	3,537		16.9%
1970	4,335		22.6%
1980	5,889		35.8%
1990	5,968		1.3%
2000	6,232		4.4%
2010	6,092		−2.2%
2020	6,121		0.5%
Source:US Census

As of 2020 the median income for a household in the town was $82,858, and the per capita income was $38,926. 13.9% of the population was below the poverty line. Out of the total population, 29% of those under the age of 18 and 4% of those 65 and older were living below the poverty line.

Winthrop has historically been known as a fast-growing suburban town, and saw its population triple during the 20th century. Its growth rate has slowed in recent years, and saw a decline in the 2010 census for the first time in almost a century, but increased slightly in the 2020 census. Winthrop has always been the largest in population municipality in Kennebec County that was classified as a town and not a city. Oakland surpassed Winthrop's population in the 2010 census.

=== 2020 census ===
As of the census of 2020, there were 6,121 people and 2,583 households residing in the town. The population density was 196 inhabitants per square mile (76/km^{2}). There were 3,342 housing units at an average density of 107 per square mile (41/km^{2}). The racial makeup of the town was 90.1% White, 5% Black or African American, 0.1% Native American, 0.2% Asian, and 4.3% from two or more races. 0% of the population were Hispanic or Latino of any race.

There were 2,583 households, of which 53% were married couples living together. The average household size was 2.4.

In the town, the population was spread out, with 5.7% under the age of 5, 23.5% under the age of 18, and 22.9% 65 or older. The median age was 43.3 years. The female population was 51.7% and male population 48.3%.

=== 2010 census ===
As of the census of 2010, there were 6,092 people, 2,598 households, and 1,740 families residing in the town. The population density was 195.3 inhabitants per square mile (75.4/km^{2}). There were 3,295 housing units at an average density of 105.6 per square mile (40.8/km^{2}). The racial makeup of the town was 97.6% White, 0.3% Black or African American, 0.2% Native American, 0.3% Asian, and 1.4% from two or more races. 1.0% of the population were Hispanic or Latino of any race.

There were 2,598 households, of which 28.2% had children under the age of 18 living with them, 52.3% were married couples living together, 10.1% had a female householder with no husband present, and 33% were non-families. 26.9% of all households were made up of individuals, and 9.5% had someone living alone who was 65 years of age or older. The average household size was 2.31 and the average family size was 2.76.

In the town, the population was spread out, with 22.3% under the age of 20, 9% from 20 to 29, 17.1% from 30 to 44, 34.2% from 45 to 64, and 17.1% who were 65 years of age or older. The median age was 46 years. The female population was 51.6% and male population 48.4%.

== Education ==
Winthrop Public Schools is an independent school district serving approximately 840 students in grades Pre-K–12. Winthrop's schools are governed by the Winthrop School Board. The five-member group consists of elected representatives from Winthrop. The members serve two-year terms and conduct monthly meetings that are open to the public. Winthrop operates three schools:

- Winthrop Grade School (Pre-K–5) 395 students
- Winthrop Middle School (6–8) 205 students
- Winthrop High School (9–12) 242 students

Winthrop is also home to the Monmouth/Winthrop Adult Education.

== Government ==
=== Local government ===
Winthrop uses the Council-Manager form of government, in which the Town Council is the primary governing authority. The Winthrop Town Council consists of seven elected members. The Town Council appoints and confirms both the Town Manager, and the Town Attorney. The Town Manager, in turn, appoints the Finance Director, and Clerk. In addition to these positions, Winthrop has several departments used to provide the services necessary to the town.

The framework for the town government is defined in the Municipal charter.

=== Political makeup ===
Winthrop is known as being politically moderate, and consistently votes for both liberals and conservatives for local, state, and national offices. In the 2020 presidential election, Joe Biden received 1,963 of the town's votes to Donald Trump's 1,649, and in the 2024 presidential election, Kamala Harris received 1,995 of the town's votes to Trump's 1,911. The Town voted in 2012 on a referendum to allow same-sex marriage 53% to 47%. Voter registration in the town reflects a balanced political landscape, with Democrats, Republicans, and unenrolled voters each comprising roughly one third of the electorate:

Voter Registration and Party Enrollment as of June 2024
Party	Total Voters	Percentage
Democratic	1476	32.9%
Republican	1429	31.8%
Independent	1350	30%
Green Independent	221	4.9%
Libertarian	13	0.3%
Total	4,489	100%

== Transportation ==
Three Maine state highways and one U.S. highway pass through the town of Winthrop, while two state highways originate in Winthrop Village and extend outward to neighboring communities:

- U.S. Route 202 enters Winthrop from Monmouth in the southwestern part of town, passes through the town center, and continues north into Manchester just north of Cobbossee Lake.
- ME 41 originates in Winthrop Village, follows closely along Maranacook Lake, and exits the town into Readfield in the northwestern part of Winthrop.
- ME 135 enters from East Monmouth in the southeastern part of town and follows close to Cobbossee Lake to Readfield before connecting with ME 17.
- ME 133 originates in Winthrop Village and travels west, exiting the town into Wayne just north of Berry Pond.
- ME 11 and ME 100 run concurrently with U.S. Route 202, with the roadway designated as Routes 11 and 100 under Maine's state highway system and as Route 202 under the U.S. Highway system.

The nearest full service commercial airports are Portland International Jetport, located approximately 55 miles away, and Bangor International Airport, about 85 miles from town. Limited commercial service is also available at Augusta State Airport, located roughly 6 miles away in Augusta, with flights to Boston. CSX Transportation, a Class I freight railroad operating in the eastern United States and the Canadian provinces of Ontario and Quebec, also passes through Winthrop regularly. Concord Coach Lines provides public transport bus service at the Augusta Transportation Center, located approximately 6 miles from town. Regional public transportation is also available in nearby Augusta through Kennebec Explorer, operated by KVCAP.

== Sites of interest ==
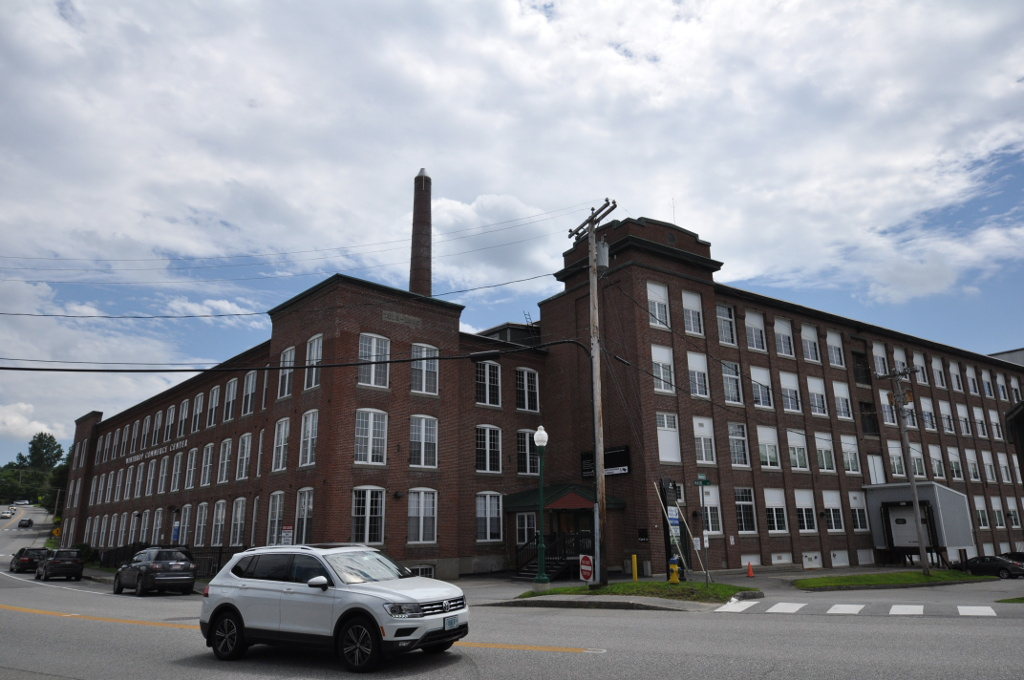
Winthrop Mills Company

Winthrop is home to Norcross Point, located in the center of the downtown Winthrop Village area. Along with the adjacent Maranacook Beach, it has provided public waterfront access and outdoor recreational opportunities since the 1970s. The site includes a public boat launch and docks, a designated swimming area, public restrooms, a gazebo, park amenities, veterans memorials, and pedestrian walkways. The village is also home to the Charles M. Bailey Public Library which serves the town of Winthrop and surrounding communities. Founded in 1916, the library is located on Bowdoin Street and hosts a range of cultural programming, including lectures, film screenings, and musical performances. The village also contains a historic textile mill complex at 149–151 Main Street known as the Winthrop Mills Company. Developed mainly between the late 19th and mid-20th centuries, it was the nation's largest manufacturer of woolen blankets for many years, and a major local employer for about 150 years. It was listed on the National Register of Historic Places in 2014.

Winthrop's East Side is home to Ladies Delight Light, a small lighthouse located on Cobbossee Lake. Constructed in 1908, it is believed to be the only active inland waters lighthouse in Maine. The tower stands 25 feet (7.6 m) tall and is equipped with a solar powered dual level LED marine beacon that operates nightly throughout the year. At the time of its construction, it was the only inland lake lighthouse east of the Mississippi River. The lighthouse was listed on the National Register of Historic Places in 1984. East Winthrop is also home to the Moses Bailey House, a historic residence located at 209 Winthrop Center Road. Built around 1853, with additional Italianate stylistic elements added in 1870, it is considered one of Winthrop's finest surviving mid 19th century farmhouses. The property was listed on the National Register of Historic Places in 1984. This area of Winthrop also includes the Horseshoe Island Preserve, a 24 acre conservation area located on Cobbossee Lake. The island is accessible by boat during the summer months and is used for cross-country skiing and snowshoeing in winter. The preserve features undeveloped shoreline and trails that pass through mature white pine and hemlock forest.

The western portion of the town is home to Mount Pisgah. The 60-foot Aermotor fire tower, owned and maintained by the Town of Winthrop and the Kennebec Land Trust, is open to the public. From the tower, visitors can access panoramic views extending east to the Camden Hills and west to Mount Washington in New Hampshire.

=== Winthrop Lakes Region ===
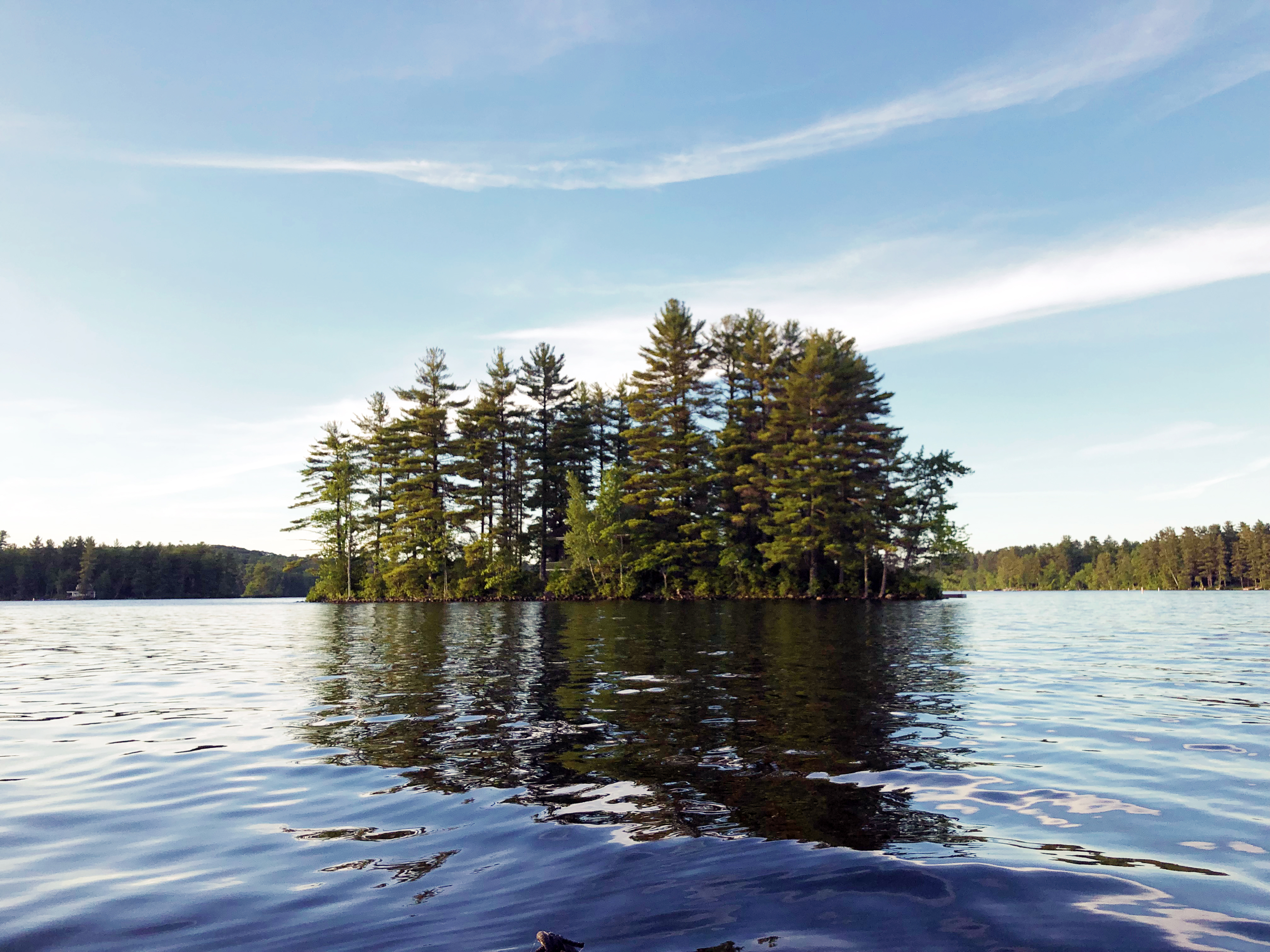
View of Islands, Maranacook Lake

Winthrop is at the center of the Winthrop Lakes Region, which is situated between Lewiston and Augusta, Maine, and centered around six major bodies of water: Androscoggin Lake, Annabessacook Lake, Cobbosseecontee Lake, Echo Lake, Maranacook Lake and Parker Pond, in addition to numerous smaller bodies of water. Besides Winthrop, the region includes the towns of Fayette, Readfield, and Mount Vernon to the north, Manchester to the east, Monmouth to the south, and Wayne to the west. The northern part of Mount Vernon is considered to be part of the Belgrade Lakes Region. The region is a popular recreation area in central Maine, with over three dozen Lakes and ponds offering a variety of boating, hiking, cycling, camping and fishing opportunities. The area is also home to numerous shoreline events, concerts and festivals.

The Winthrop Lakes Region includes the following bodies of water:

Name	Area (acres)	Volume (acre-feet)	Adjoining towns
Cobbosseecontee Lake*	5,543	127,371	Litchfield, Manchester, Monmouth, West Gardiner, Winthrop
Androscoggin Lake	4,020	56,736	Leeds, Wayne
Maranacook Lake	1,844	48,020	Readfield, Winthrop
Parker Pond	1,524	41,636	Fayette, Vienna
Annabessacook Lake	1,415	23,892	Monmouth, Winthrop
Echo Lake (Crotched Pond)	1,109	23,134	Fayette, Mount Vernon, Readfield
Torsey (Greeley) Lake	679	7,078	Mount Vernon, Readfield
Pocasset Lake	605	7,225	Wayne
Wilson Pond	588	9,510	Monmouth, Wayne, Winthrop
Woodbury (Purgatory) Pond (Tacoma Lakes)	513	7,296	Litchfield, Monmouth
Cochnewagon Pond	394	7,208	Monmouth
Lovejoy Pond	379	4,365	Fayette, Readfield, Wayne
David Pond	302	2,852	Chesterville, Fayette
Sand Pond (Tacoma Lakes)	279	6,798	Litchfield, Monmouth
Upper Narrows Pond	239	4,951	Winthrop
Lower Narrows Pond	223	5,842	Winthrop
Carlton Pond	223	5,270	Readfield, Winthrop
Berry Pond	175	1,493	Wayne, Winthrop
Pickerel Pond	128	1,459	Wayne
Tilton Pond	116	1,586	Fayette
Dexter Pond	113	995	Wayne, Winthrop
Apple Valley Lake	101	238	Winthrop
Little Cobbosseecontee	91	894	Winthrop
Hales Pond	76	929	Fayette
Taylor (Mill) Pond	75		Mount Vernon
Mosher (Lane's) Pond	70	945	Fayette
Shed Pond	51	219	Manchester, Readfield
Echo Lake Outlet Pond	51		Fayette
Silver Lake (Figure Eight Pond)	34	495	Manchester, Sidney
Basin Pond	33	1,355	Fayette
Bog Pond	26	246	Readfield
Tyler Pond	25	451	Manchester
Burgess Pond	24	226	Fayette
Desert Pond	22	363	Mount Vernon
Kezar Pond	20	250	Winthrop
Mud Pond	18	170	Monmouth
Mill Pond	18		Readfield
Cranberry Pond	17	170	Fayette
Fairbanks Pond	16	122	Manchester
Brainard Pond	15		Readfield
Muddy Pond	11		Wayne

*Cobbosseecontee Lake (known locally as Cobbossee) is nationally recognized as one of the top bass-fishing lakes in America due to its impressive largemouth population. Cobbossee also has the only active inland waters lighthouse in Maine, Ladies Delight Light.

== Historical postcards ==
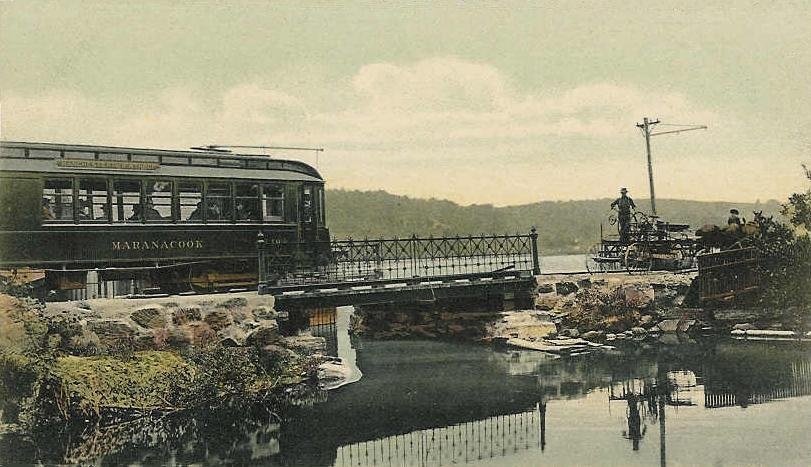
Upper Dam Bridge c. 1905

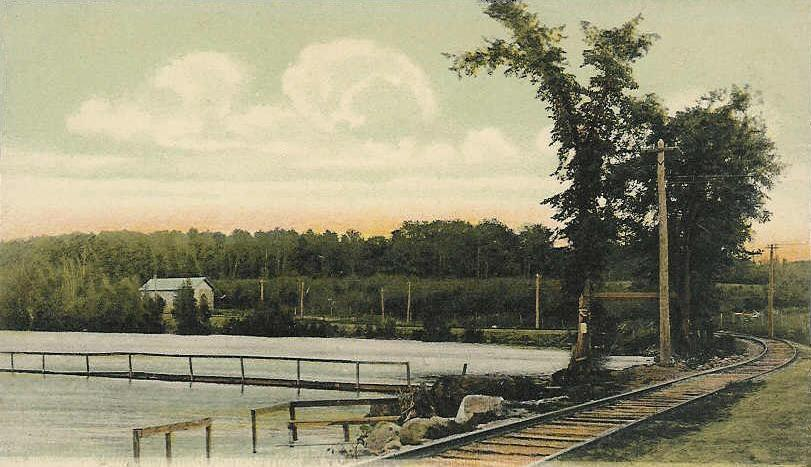
Maranacook Lake c. 1905

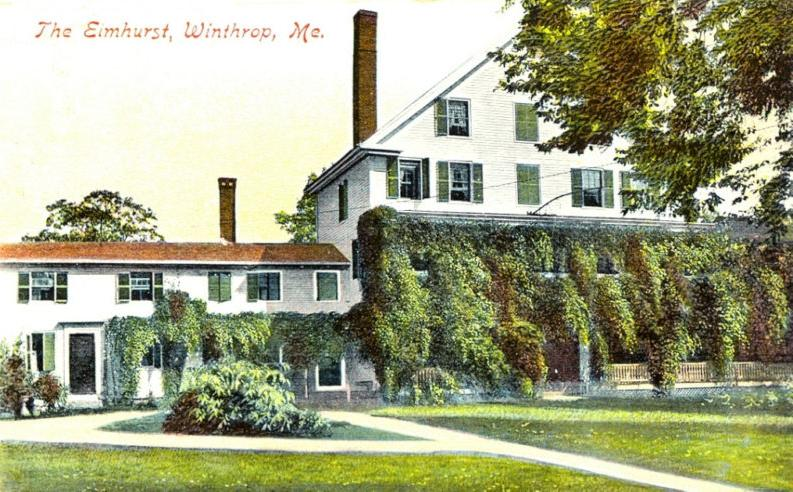
The Elmhurst in 1908

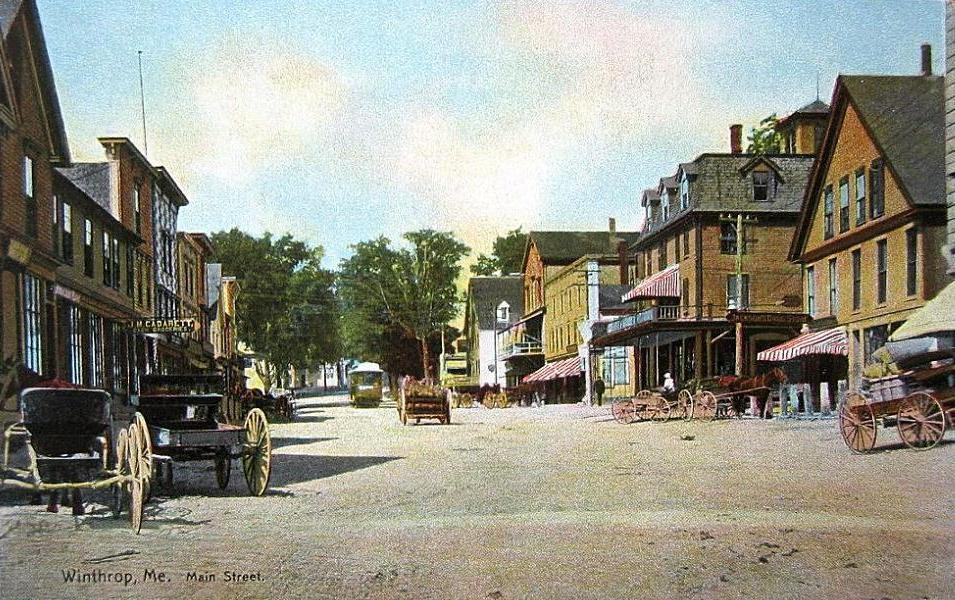
Main Street c. 1910

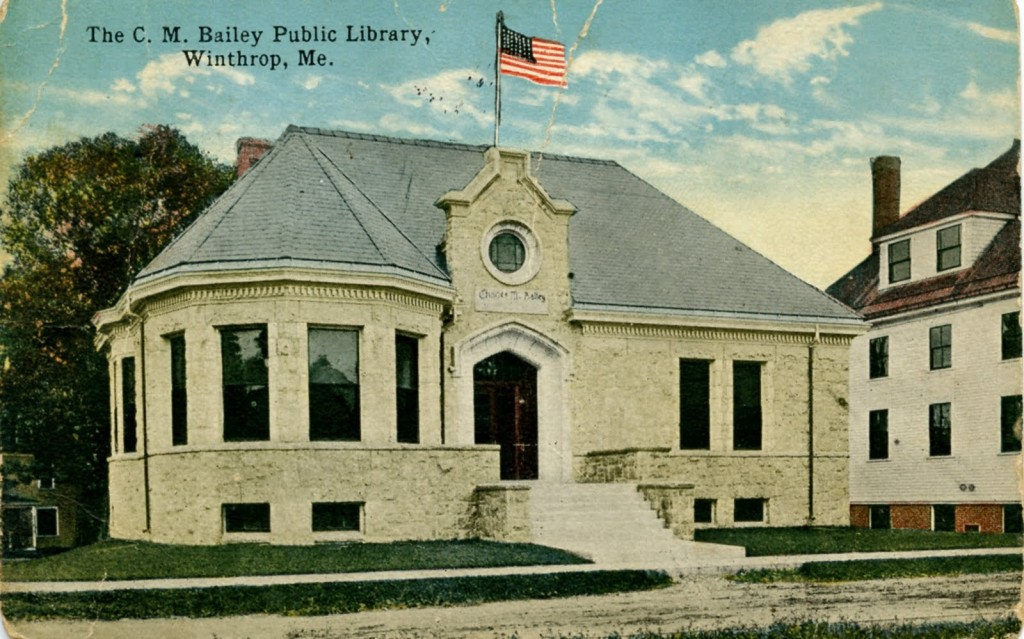
Public library in 1922

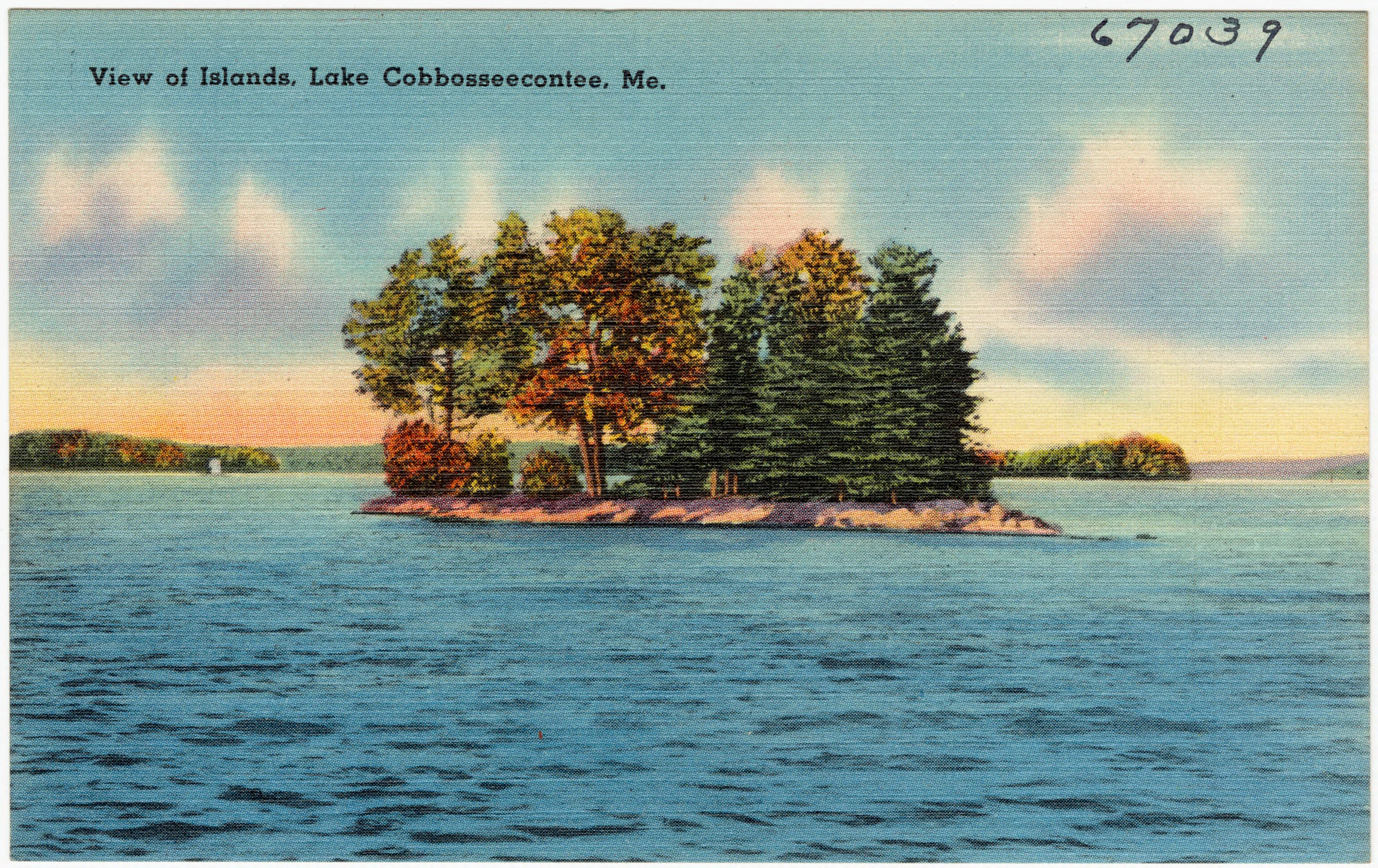
Islands, Lake Cobbossee c. 1930

== Notable people ==
- John T. Averill, US congressman
- Hannah Johnston Bailey, Quaker teacher, pacifist, activist, and advocate for peace and women's suffrage
- Samuel P. Benson, US congressman
- Del Bissonette, MLB first baseman and coach
- Adrian Blevins, poet
- Linda Smith Dyer, lawyer, lobbyist, and women's rights activist
- Thomas Fillebrown, head of the American Dental Association
- Patrick Flood, Maine state legislator
- Olga Fonda, film and television actress and model
- Timothy Foster, captain during the American Revolutionary War
- Henry H. Goddard, psychologist and eugenicist
- Tavis Hasenfus, attorney and politician
- Craig Hickman, writer, farmer and state legislator
- Daniel Hodgdon, author of science books for young people
- Ezekiel Holmes, agriculturalist and politician
- April Kingsley, art critic and curator
- Seth May, justice of the Maine Supreme Judicial Court
- Marilyn R. N. Mollicone, botanist
- Elizabeth Armstrong Reed, scholar/author
- Ben Roy, comedian and musician
- Jerrold Speers, politician and lawyer
- Lee St. Hilaire, college football quarterback
- Emily Fairbanks Talbot, philanthropist
- Barbara Walsh, Pulitzer Prize–winning journalist
- Benjamin White, US congressman
- George F. Wilson, MLB catcher
- Henry Clay Wood, U.S. Army officer who received the Medal of Honor during the American Civil War
