= Ladies Delight Light =

Lighthouse in Maine, US

- Ladies’ Delight Lighthouse, Lake Cobbosseecontee
- U.S. National Register of Historic Places
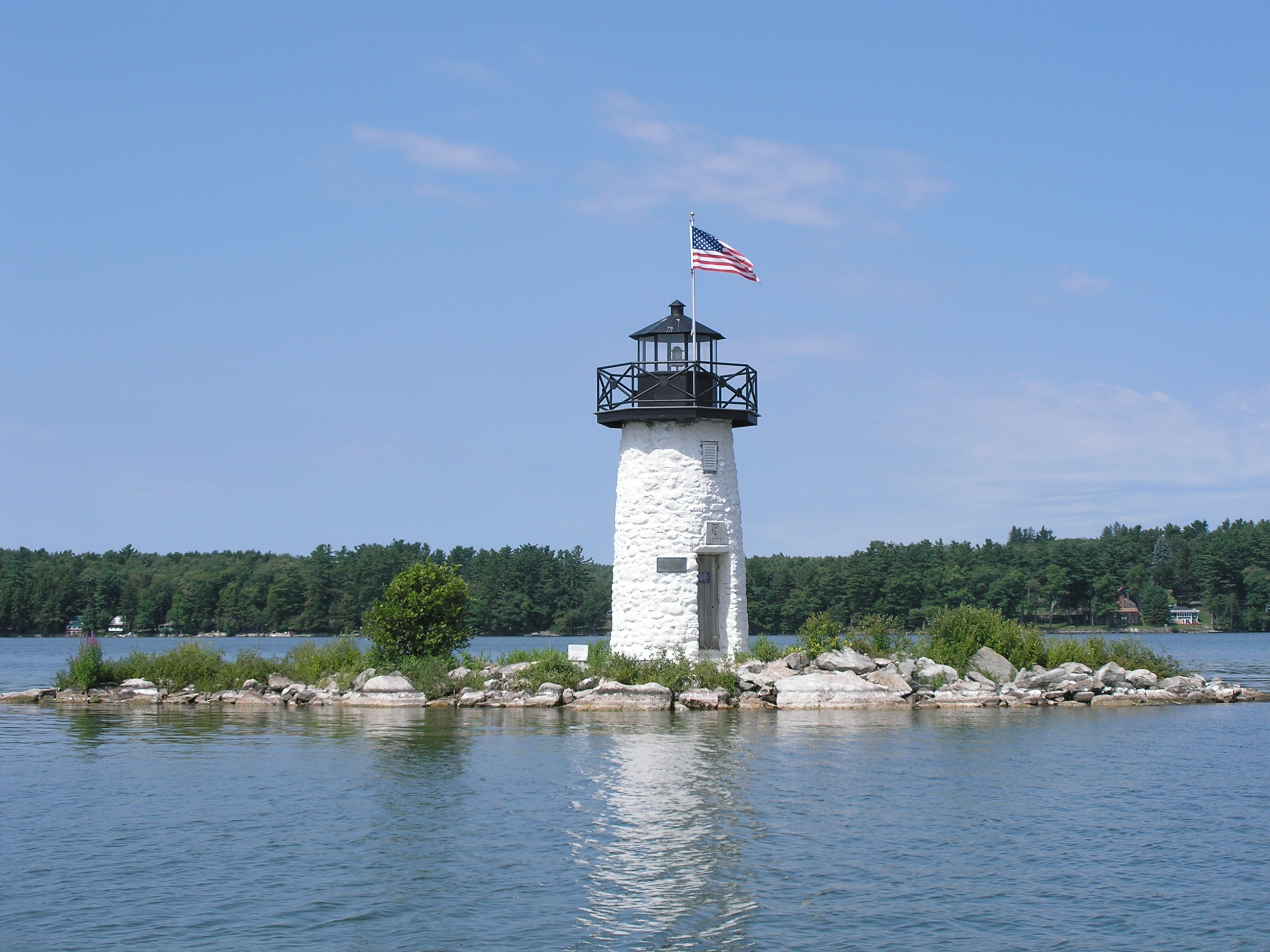

- Location within Maine Location within the United States
- Location: Ladies Delight Island, Winthrop, Maine
- Area: 0.1 acres (0.040 ha)
- Built: 1908
- NRHP reference No.: 84001369
- Added to NRHP: January 12, 1984

The Ladies Delight Light is a small lighthouse on Cobbosseecontee Lake, in Winthrop, Maine, United States. It was constructed in 1908 and is believed to be the only active inland waters lighthouse in Maine. The tower is 25 feet (7.6 m) tall, and is equipped with a solar powered dual-level LED marine beacon. It operates every night of the year. At the time of its construction, it was the only inland lake lighthouse east of the Mississippi River. It was listed on the National Register of Historic Places in 1984.

== History ==
The lighthouse was designed by Frank Morse, a Boston marine architect. It was financed by Daniel Robinson, the first commodore of the Cobbosseecontee Yacht Club. Total cost was $500. The small island on which it was constructed, Ladies Delight, is formed by the central part of a large reef; the lighthouse was built to keep a passenger launch at the south end of the lake from running aground in the area. The Cobbosseecontee Yacht Club erected the tower with the help of two oxen. Due to the size of their barge, they could only transport one at a time. They took the first one to the island, and then returned to shore for the second. In the interval the first ox grew lonely, and began swimming back to the mainland as the workers returned with its partner. Finally, both oxen were successfully transported, and the lighthouse was built over the course of the summer.

Members of the Cobbosseecontee Yacht Club have always maintained the lighthouse. Originally its light was provided by kerosene lanterns; a volunteer keeper went out each evening to trim the wicks, clean the globes, and light the beacon. A reflector in the light was rotated by a system of weights from a longcase clock. A wind-powered generator powered the light for a while in the 1930s. In later years, beginning in the 1970’s, power was provided by cable from a home on the shore in Manchester. In November 2017, a solar powered marine-grade LED beacon was installed. The top section of the lighthouse, originally constructed of metal, was replaced with wooden structures several times. During much of the time that wooden top structures existed there was an osprey nest on the top of the tower. In 2005 a new aluminum top was designed and constructed to replicate the original top.

Located in the North Bay of Lake Cobbosseecontee, the lighthouse was placed on the National Register of Historic Places in 1984. In 2001 it had a severe list corrected and in 2005 a new top constructed of marine grade aluminum was installed. The structure was formally dedicated on July 16, 2005 in a ceremony conducted by retiring CYC Commodore, Hugh Stephens.

On August 9, 2008 a 100th anniversary celebration was held at the lighthouse followed by an anniversary party at the nearby home of a former commodore (Charles McCarthy).

== See also ==
- National Register of Historic Places listings in Kennebec County, Maine
