= Charles M. Bailey Public Library =

Public library in Winthrop, Maine, US

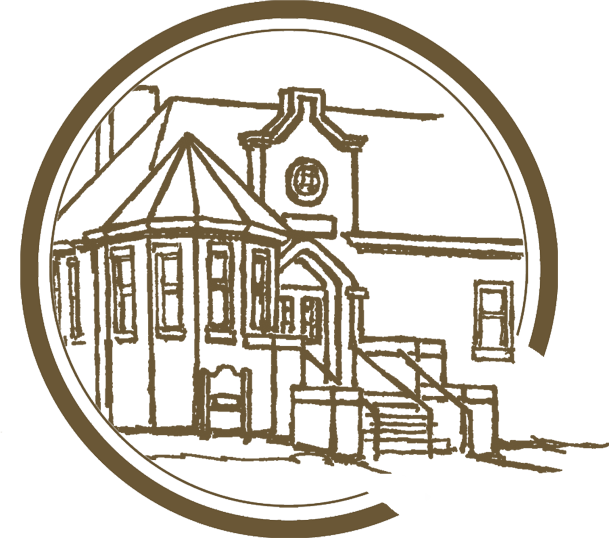
- Location: Winthrop, Maine, United States
- Type: Public
- Established: 1916; 110 years ago

Collection
- Size: 29,000

Access and use
- Circulation: 73,000
- Population served: 6,092

Other information
- Director: Richard Fortin
- Employees: 10
- Charles M. Bailey Library
- U.S. National Register of Historic Places
- Location within Maine Location within the United States
- Location: 39 Bowdoin St., Winthrop, Maine
- Coordinates: 44°18′29″N 69°58′24″W
- Area: 0.5 acres (0.2 ha)
- Built: 1916; 110 years ago
- Architect: Stevens, John Calvin; Stevens, John Howard
- NRHP reference No.: 85001264
- Added to NRHP: June 20, 1985; 41 years ago

The Charles M. Bailey Public Library is the public library serving Winthrop, Maine. It is known as the Bailey Public Library and is commonly referred to as the Bailey Library. It is located at 39 Bowdoin Street, near the town center. It was officially established by the town on November 4, 1916, and opened to the public on December 2, 1916. The library became a free library in 1970, and was added to the National Register of Historic Places in 1985. The original granite structure was designed by prominent Maine architect John Calvin Stevens, and his son John Howard Stevens. The 2015 addition was designed by Maine architect Philip M Locashio.

== Founding ==
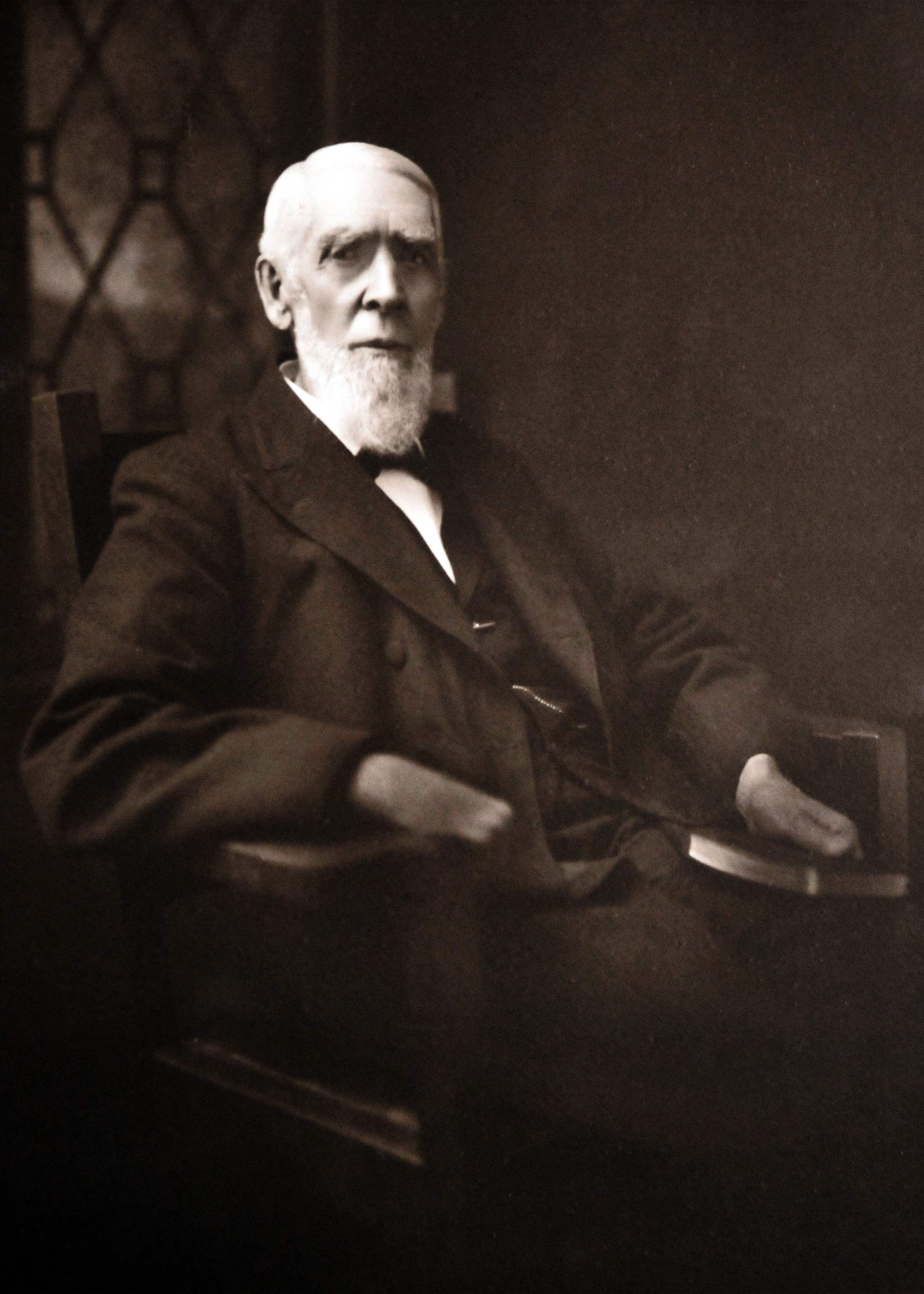
Portrait of Charles M. Bailey (1820–1917)

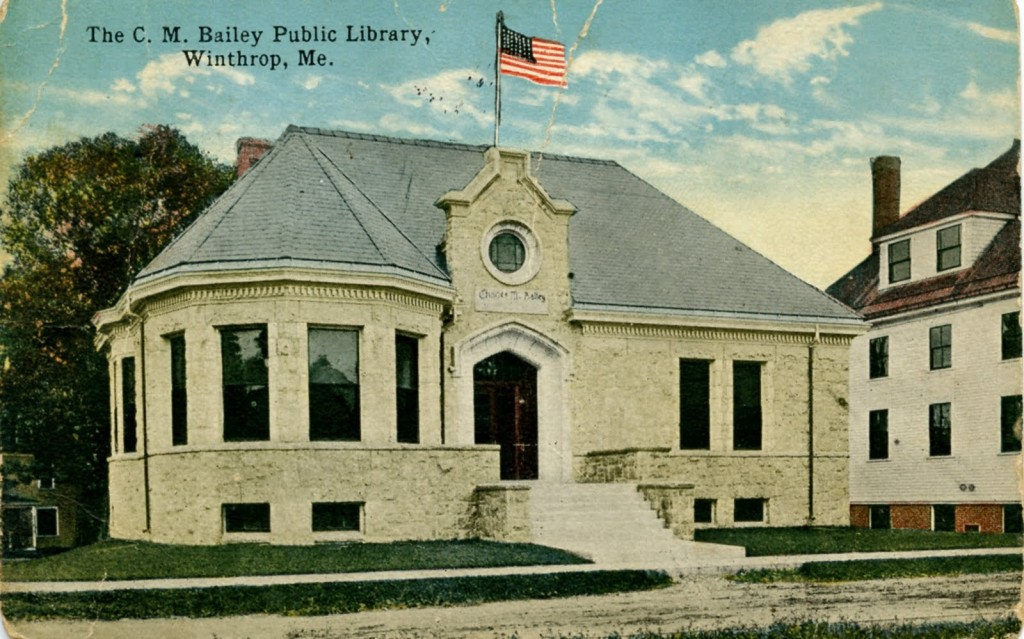
Bailey Library in 1922

The Winthrop Public Library was originally opened on July 8, 1889. The library location was referred to as "Packard Block" in early Town Reports. The original library contained 1,322 volumes at the time of opening and featured a reading room. The collection had grown to 2,700 volumes by 1904. The cost to use the original library was $1 per year, and the original library construction was funded through a combination of private fundraising and a Town grant.

In November 1916, Charles M. Bailey of Winthrop, Maine, entered into an agreement with the Town of Winthrop to give a new building to be used for library and reading room purposes. The new library was opened to the public on December 2, 1916, in a dedication ceremony that featured president of Colby College, Arthur J. Roberts, and Dennis' Orchestra of Augusta, Maine. Charles M. Bailey was the best known member of the Society of Friends in Winthrop, and was known for his "Bailey's Praying Band", who conducted evangelistic services. Bailey also owned one of the largest oilcloth manufacturers in America at the time, and employed two hundred individuals in Winthrop in the early 1900s. The 1916 structure of rock faced and chiseled granite is still in use today.

Charles Irving Bailey (the elder son of Charles M. Bailey) was the first person to serve as Chair of the newly formed Board of Trustees. Lula A. Clifford was the first head librarian to serve in the new Bailey building, and served to the time of her death in 1940. Clifford's starting salary was $1 for each afternoon and evening the library was open to the public, and in 1920 was set at $25 per month. Mr. John Stanley served as Town Librarian for twenty-five years (at the Packard Block location) before Charles M. Bailey donated the Bowdoin St. building. John Stanley continued serving on the Board of Trustees and Book Committee after Clifford was hired in 1916. Lula A. Clifford was noted as being Stanley's assistant librarian prior to 1916.

The first book replacement notice was sent out to C.S. Fowle on January 17, 1920.

== Expansion ==
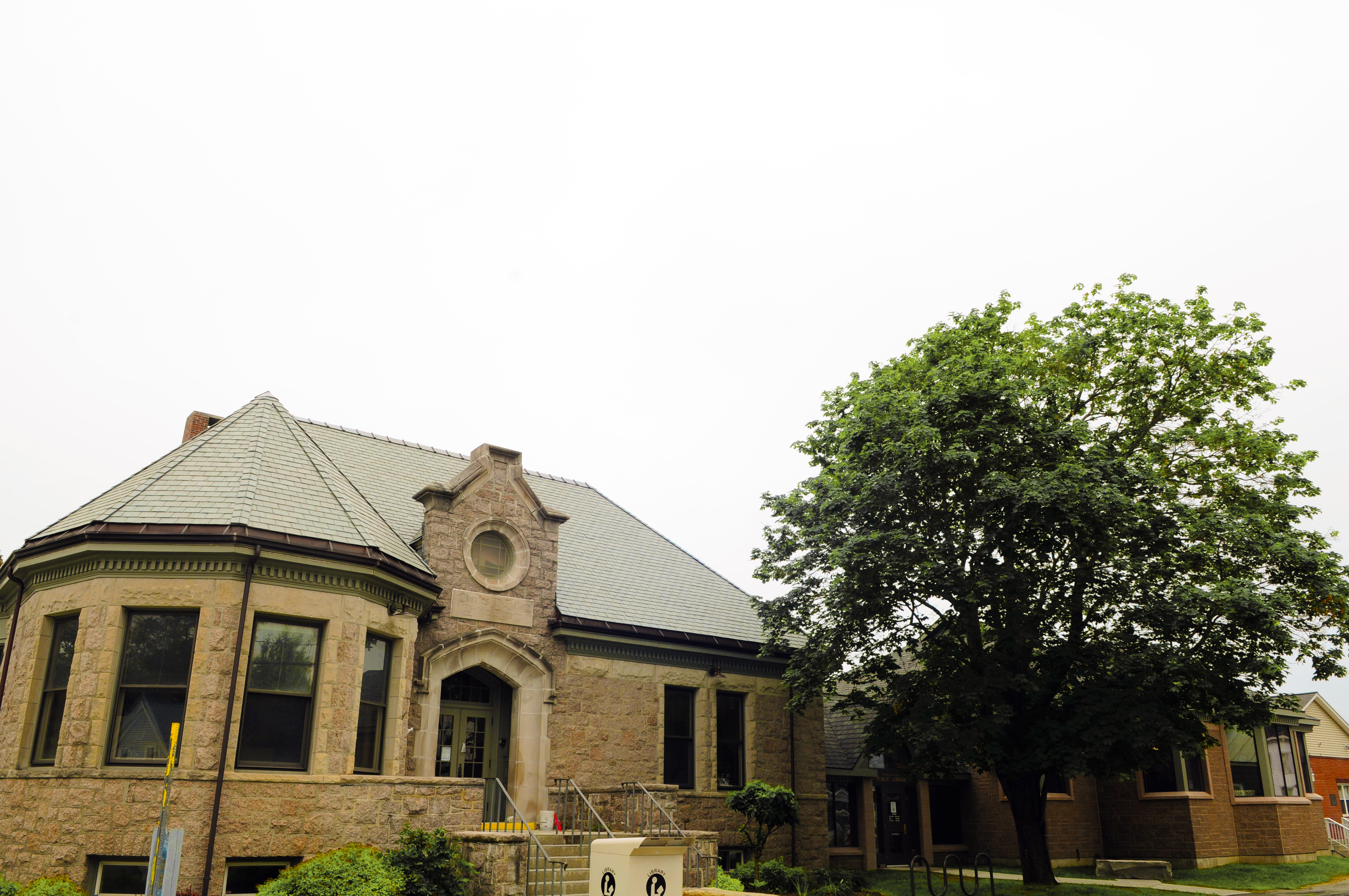
Expanded Bailey Library in 2015

The library Building Committee first encouraged the Board of Trustees to start thinking in terms of future expansion and acquisition of adjacent land in 1966, and in 1972 the Board of Trustees hired architect George Royal to establish a plan for library expansion. The Winthrop Masonic Hall (occupying the adjacent land necessary for expansion) was put on the market in 1973, and the library Building Committee requested right of first refusal of the property. Further, a 1973 Maine State Evaluation of the library reported that "additional space is much needed and...the library shows a definite need for expansion...". In 1974 the library began renovating the basement to be used as a Children's Room. In 2005, the Town of Winthrop purchased the adjacent land necessary for library expansion, and the Board of Trustees hired architect Phil Locashio and began planning. In 2012, the Library Trustees announced the capital fundraising campaign chairpersons, and in 2014 Library and Winthrop Town officials announced plans to begin construction on a one-story addition in September, 2014. The expanded library opened on June 1, 2015.

== 2009 Fire ==
The library closed on March 6, 2009 when a 16-year-old boy pushed a flaming roll of paper towels into the building's boiler room through a basement window, causing extensive damage. The library operated out of Town Hall on Highland Avenue until its reopening in August 2009.

== See also ==
- National Register of Historic Places listings in Kennebec County, Maine
