= Mount Pisgah (Kennebec County, Maine) =

Mountain in Maine, United States

- Location within Maine

Highest point
- Elevation: 815 ft (248 m)
- Coordinates: 44°18′24″N 70°01′05″W

Geography
- Location: Winthrop, Maine, U.S.
- Topo map: USGS Winthrop

Mount Pisgah is a mountain located in the town of Winthrop, Maine. Its summit is the fifth highest in Kennebec County.

A popular hiking loop, made up of the .7 mile Tower Trail and 1.3 mile Blueberry Trail, provides access to a fire tower at the top of Mount Pisgah. The tower offers a 360° view reaching from the Camden Hills in the East to New Hampshire's Mount Washington in the West.

== History ==
Ezekiel Holmes, an American agriculturalist and politician known as the "father of Maine agriculture" resided on Mt. Pisgah in the mid 1800s.

From 1949-1992 the Maine Forest Service operated a fire lookout on Mount Pisgah. The 60’ Aermotor fire tower is owned and maintained by the Town of Winthrop and the Kennebec Land Trust and open to the public

As of 2017, the Kennebec Land Trust was expanding the trail.
