= Annabessacook Lake =

Lake in Kennebec County, Maine, United States

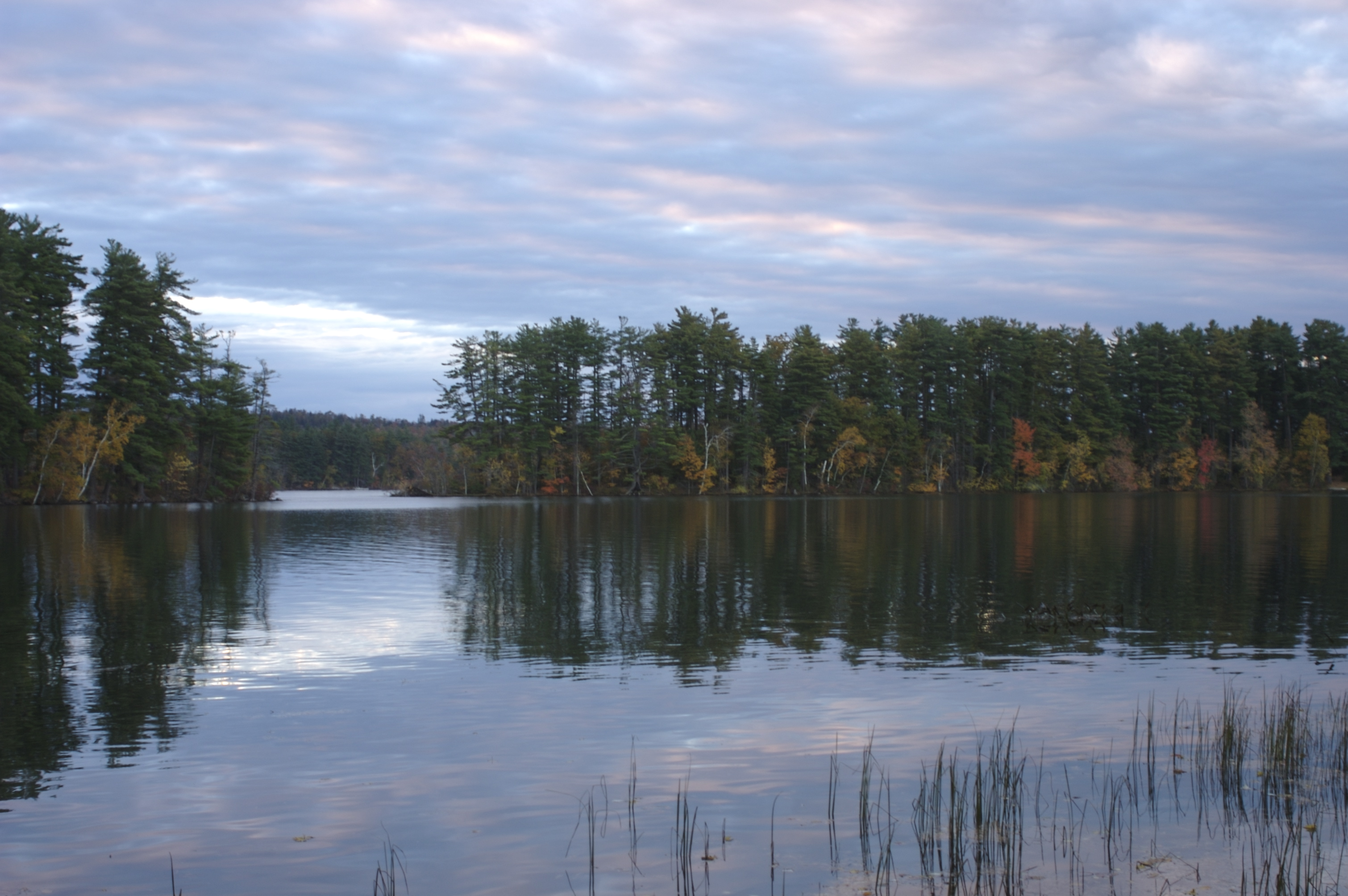

- Location within Maine
- Location: Kennebec County, Maine
- Coordinates: 44°16′06″N 69°58′52″W
- Primary inflows: Maranacook Lake Outlet
- Primary outflows: Jug Stream
- Basin countries: United States
- Surface area: 1,420 acres (570 ha)
- Average depth: 21 feet (6.4 m)
- Max. depth: 49 ft (15 m)
- Water volume: 23,892 acre⋅ft (29,470,000 m^{3})
- Shore length^{1}: 17.6 miles (28.3 km)
- Surface elevation: 164 ft (50 m)
- Islands: Big Island
- Settlements: Monmouth, Winthrop
- ^{1} Shore length is not a well-defined measure.

Annabessacook Lake is a lake located in the towns of Monmouth and Winthrop, Maine. It is 49 feet (15 m) deep, and covers about 2.2 square miles (6 km^{2}) in surface area. It is one of the major bodies of water in the Winthrop Lakes Region.
