= East Winthrop, Maine =

Coordinates: 44°19′18″N 69°53′47″W

East Winthrop is a village in the town of Winthrop in Kennebec County, Maine, United States. It is located just west of Manchester and south of Readfield, borders most of Cobbosseecontee Lake, and all of Little Cobbosseecontee, Upper and Lower Narrows. It has a separate post office and ZIP code (04343) from the rest of Winthrop, although this serves only mail delivered to post office boxes in the East Winthrop Post Office. The area has magnificent views of the Cobbosseecontee bodies of water.
