= Thomas Fillebrown =

American physician

Dr. Thomas Fillebrown
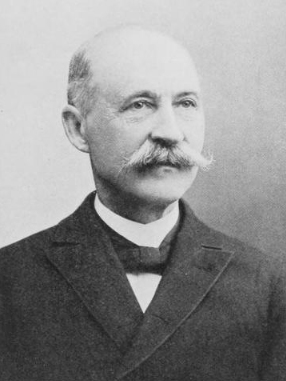
- c. 1899
- Born: January 13, 1836; Winthrop, Maine, United States
- Died: January 22, 1908 (aged 72); Boston, Massachusetts, United States
- Education: Towle Academy, Mount Weslyn Seminary, Harvard School of Dental Medicine, Bowdoin College
- Occupation: Physician
- Known for: head of American Dental Association, president American Academy of Dental Science
- Notable work: wrote Textbook on Operative Dentistry
- Spouse: Helen O. Dalton (m. 1861)
- Children: 1 son, 3 daughters
- Parents: Dr. James Bowdoin (father); Almira Fillerbrown (mother)

Dr. Thomas Fillebrown (January 13, 1836 – January 22, 1908) was an American dentist and the head of the American Dental Association from 1897 to 1898.

== Life ==
Dr. Fillebrown was born in Winthrop, Maine. He was son of Dr. James Bowdoin and Almira Fillerbrown. He attended Towle Academy and Mount Weslyn Seminary from which he graduated in 1859. He began his career as teacher in a Public School and then began helping his father J. B. Fillebrown, who was a dentist himself. Thomas Fillebrown was a dentist and a professor of dentistry at Harvard University from 1883 to 1904. He was a successful oral surgeon and performed operations to fix cleft palates. He held a degree in dentistry from Harvard School of Dental Medicine, obtained in 1869. He was part of the first graduating class of Harvard Dental School. He also obtained a medical degree from Bowdoin College in 1863.

He wrote a textbook called Textbook on Operative Dentistry. He was married to Helen O. Dalton in September 1861. They had children Edith, Harriet, Helen and Winthrop. Dr. Fillebrown wrote many articles on the subject of oral surgery, hare-lip, cleft-palate, hypnosis of dental obtundant and anesthesia. After the merging of the American Dental Association and Southern Dental Association, he became the first president of the National Dental Association in 1897.

Fillebrown died in Boston on January 22, 1908. At the time of his death he was serving as president of the American Academy of Dental Science.

== Awards and positions ==
- National Dental Association - President (1897)
- American Academy of Dental Science - President
- Maine State Dental Association - President (1907)
- Harvard Dental Alumni Association - President (1871-1874)
- Harvard School of Dental Medicine - Professor (1883-1904)

== Sources ==
- The Journal of The Allied Dental Societies, pp. 101–113
- Hyamson, Albert Montefiore. A Dictionary of Universal Biography of All ages and all people. p. 211.
