= Cobbosseecontee Lake =

Lake Cobbosseecontee
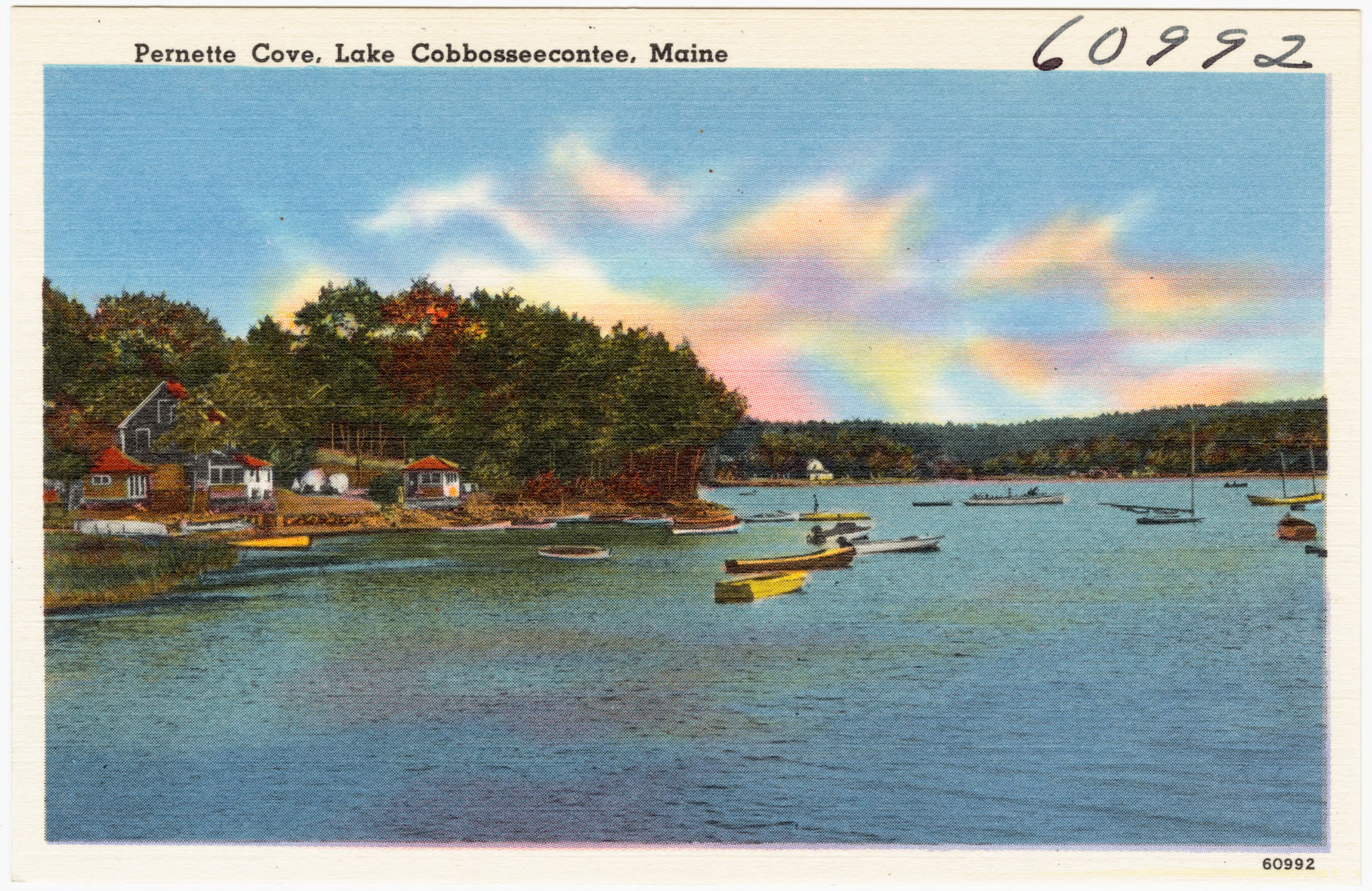
- A postcard of Pernette Cove

- Location within Maine Location within the United States
- Location: Kennebec County, Maine
- Coordinates: 44°15′N 69°56′W
- Type: Reservoir
- Basin countries: United States
- Max. length: 9 mi (14 km)
- Surface area: 5,543 acres (2,243 ha)
- Max. depth: 100 ft (30 m)
- Water volume: 127,371 acre⋅ft (157,110,000 m^{3})
- Shore length^{1}: 62 miles (100 km)
- Surface elevation: 167 ft (51 m)
- Islands: Belle Island, Black Island, Blue Bell Island, Cuba Island, Frog Island, Goodwin Island, Grape Island, Green Island, Hersey Island, Hodgdon Island, Horseshoe Island, Island Park, Ladies Delight Light, Leclair Island, Long Island, Lower Sister Island, Lovers Island, Maple Ridge Island, Merrill Island, Molazigan Island, Packards Ledge, Pine Island, Pinkham Island, Richards Island, Scott Island, Sheep Island, Upper Sister Island
- Settlements: Litchfield, Manchester, Monmouth, West Gardiner, Winthrop
- ^{1} Shore length is not a well-defined measure.

Lake Cobbosseecontee (/kəˈbɒsəkɒnti/, also known as Cobbossee Lake, is a lake located in the towns of Litchfield, Manchester, Monmouth, West Gardiner, and Winthrop in the U.S. state of Maine. It is the largest lake in the Winthrop Lakes Region at 100 feet (30 m) deep, covering about 8.7 square miles (23 km^{2}) in surface area, a length of 9 miles (14 km), and a shoreline of 62 miles (100 km). The word Cobbosseecontee translates to "plenty of sturgeon" in Wabanaki.

== Recreation and physical characteristics ==
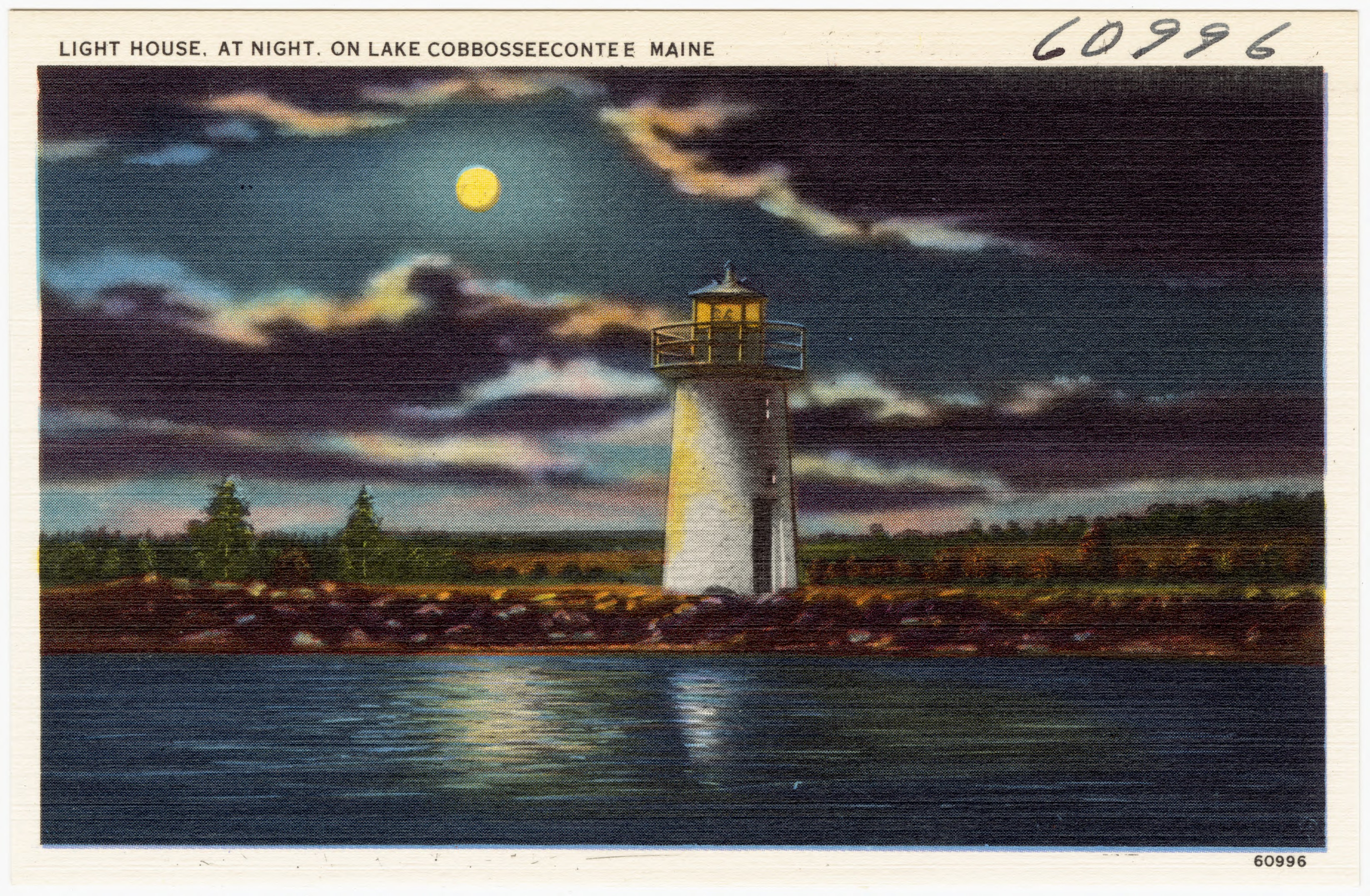
A postcard of Ladies Delight Light

Lake Cobbosseecontee is known for its beautifully irregular shape, which consists of numerous glacial coves, jetties, and islands. The lake is connected to Pleasant Pond (Cobbosseecontee Stream). It also has the only active inland waters lighthouse in Maine, Ladies' Delight Light. The 25-foot (7.6 m) high lighthouse, constructed in 1908, is under the ownership and care of the Cobbosseecontee Yacht Club. The lighthouse marks the northern edge of a jagged underwater reef that runs down the middle of the lake. The archipelago of islands and exposed ledges are the visible high points of that reef. A state-owned public launch is located on the southwest shore of the lake in East Monmouth. Low hills and ridges surround the lake, and Monks Hill and Allen Hill rise a few miles north of the lake, while a gray line of hills form a barrier near Sabattus.

There are many year-round homes and cottages along the shoreline, with some new developments and gentrification having occurred steadily since the 1990s. The lake is home to Camp Cobbossee, Camp Kippewa, Pilgrim Lodge, and the YMCA Camp of Maine and had been the site of Camp Yukon, which is now just called Yukon Cottages, but which had been founded by Chief Smith in the year 1914 and served several generations of kids as a sleep away summer camp for kids from 6 years of age to teenagers who served as junior counselors.

== Yacht Club and Lake Association ==
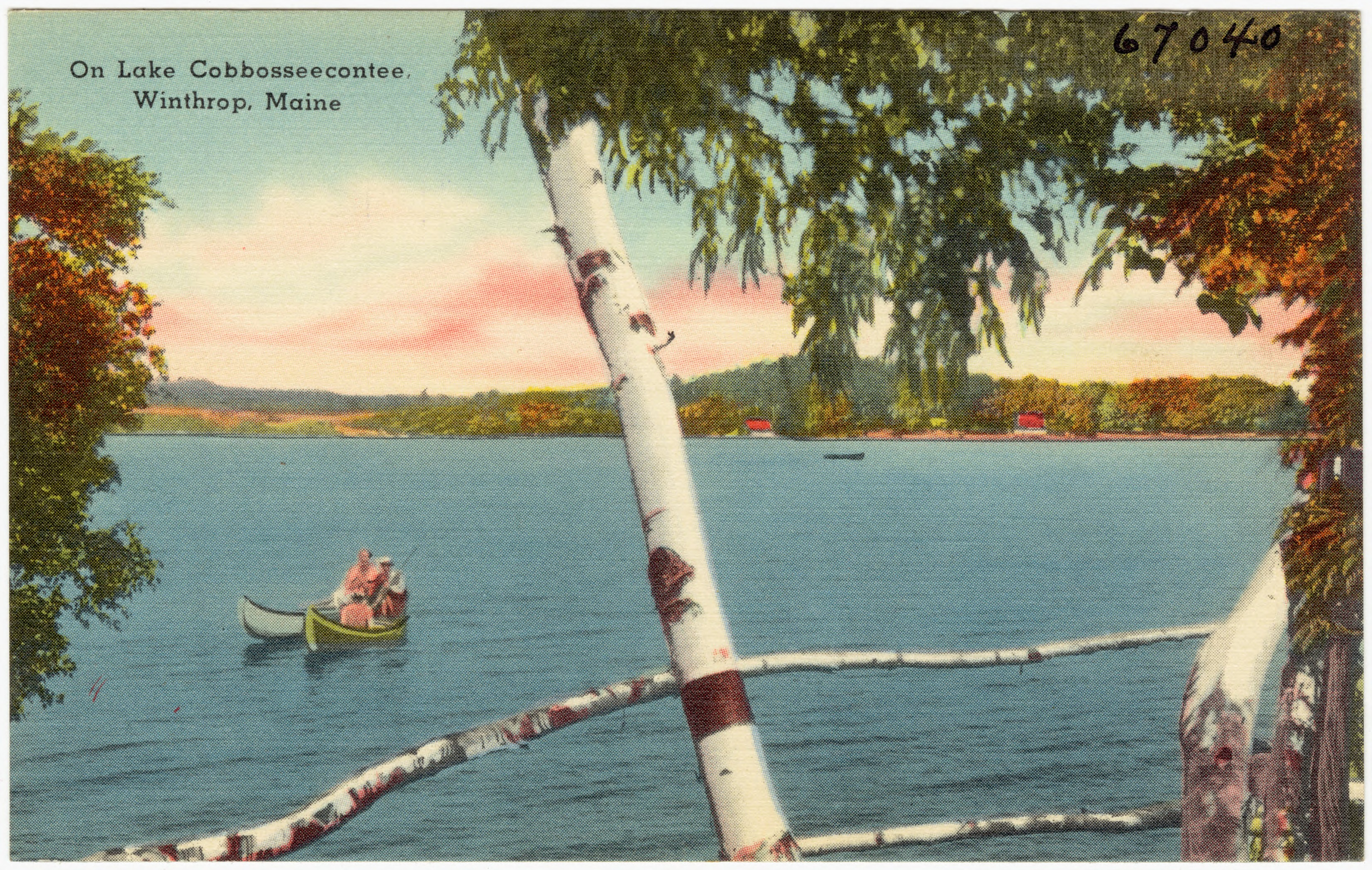
Boating on Lake Cobbosseecontee, Winthrop, Maine.

The Cobbosseecontee Lake Association represents property owners on the lake and promotes stewardship of the lake.

=== History ===
Founded in 1904, the Cobbosseecontee Yacht Club is one of the oldest continually operating inland yacht clubs in the United States. It was founded by Daniel C. Robinson, who served as its first commodore. Robinson was a member of the Boston Yacht Club. In 2019, the club's name was changed to the Cobbosseecontee Yacht Club Lake Association. In 2022, the name was shortened to Cobbosseecontee Lake Association. The club continues to maintain and preserve the lighthouse.

=== Historical ice out dates ===
The Cobbosseecontee Lake Association maintains a list of annual ice out dates. The annual date of ice out began being recorded in 1861, during the Civil War.

== Water quality ==
Between the 1960s and the early 2000s, Lake Cobbosseecontee's water quality was impaired by severe algae blooms and murky water clarity during the hot summer months, both of which impacted recreation and fish populations quite extensively. However, several cleanup efforts began to surface in the 1970s, likely inspired in part by the EPA's Clean Water Act. A few decades later, the actions had proven successful, and Cobbosseecontee's water quality rapidly improved throughout the 90's and 2000's as phosphorus runoff decreased and the natural springs that feed the lake began to "flush out" many of the remaining pollutants. As of May 2007, Cobboseecontee's water quality rivaled that of other clearwater lakes, with many boaters able to see over 8 feet (2.4 m) down, on occasion.

== Fishing ==
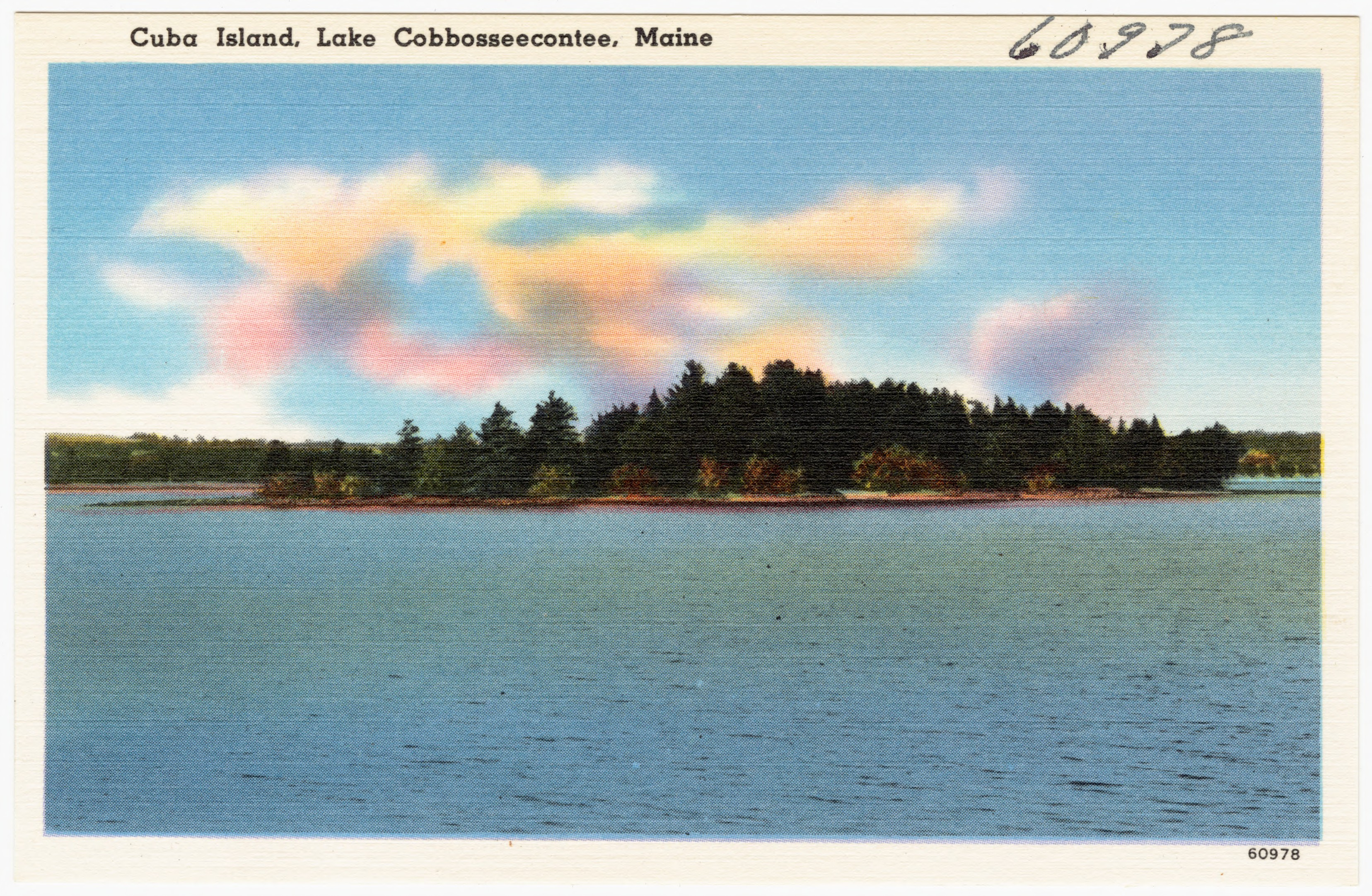
A postcard of Cuba Island, circa 1930–1945

The lake is nationally recognized as one of the best fishing lakes in America, mostly due to its impressive populations of Largemouth bass and Northern Pike. Despite both species being considered invasive in Maine, many anglers flock to Cobbosseecontee each season to hunt down these aggressive predators. There are also many other types of popular fish that can be found in the lake, including brook trout, brown trout, rainbow smelt, white perch, yellow perch, bullheads, sunfish and crappie. A popular bass fishing technique on Cobbosseecontee involves casting or slowly trolling around the lake's numerous islands, coves, and ledges during the summer months, while the pike are subsequently most active in these same areas during winter.
