= Winthrop Street Historic District =

Historic district in Maine, United States

- U.S. National Register of Historic Places
- U.S. Historic district
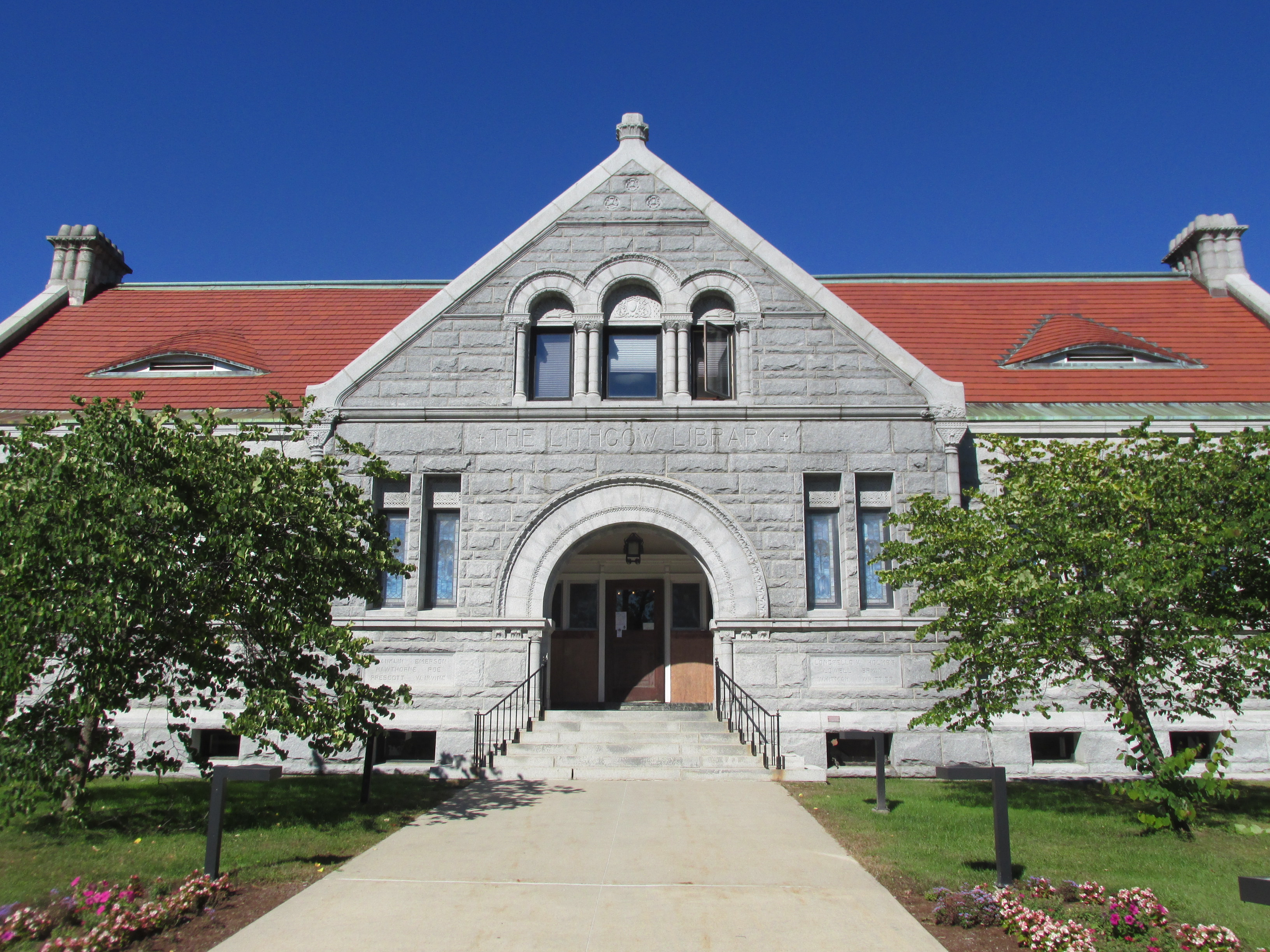
- The Lithgow Library

- Location within Maine Location within the United States
- Location: Roughly bounded by State, Bridge, North and South Chestnut, and Green Sts., Augusta, Maine
- Coordinates: 44°18′54″N 69°46′52″W
- Area: 100 acres (40 ha)
- Architect: Little, Thomas; Stevens, John Calvin
- Architectural style: Federal, Greek Revival, et.al.
- NRHP reference No.: 01000815 (original); 08001255 (increase)

Significant dates
- Added to NRHP: August 6, 2001
- Boundary increase: December 30, 2008

The Winthrop Street Historic District encompasses a predominantly residential area of Augusta, Maine encapsulating about 100 years of residential home development. The area features high-quality and well-preserved examples of homes from the early 19th to early 20th centuries, as well as two churches and the Lithgow Library. The district occupies a roughly triangular area west of downtown Augusta and north of the state capitol district. It was listed on the National Register of Historic Places in 2001, and enlarged slightly in 2008.

== Description and history ==
The Winthrop Street Historic District is located on Augusta's west side, with portions of Winthrop and State Streets as its major through streets. The district extends west and south from the junction of these two roads, also including properties on side streets extending to the north of Winthrop and the east of State. It is roughly bounded on the southwest by properties on Green, Chapel, Court, and Chestnut Streets. It is about 100 acres (40 ha) in size, and includes 193 historic buildings. Ten of these have been previously listed individually on the National Register: the Fuller-Weston House, the Tappan-Viles House, the Gov. John F. Hill Mansion, the All Souls Church, the Dr. J.W. Ellis House, the Kennebec County Courthouse, the library, the Lot Morrill House, and the South Parish Congregational Church and Parish House. Stylistically, the buildings in the district range from the Federal period to the Colonial Revival, with fine examples of late Victorian residential architecture included. The size and scale also vary, from the grand Hill Mansion to more modest Federal period houses. The district was enlarged in 2008 by the addition of a single house, the 1830s Federal style house of merchant George Morton at 20 Spring Street.

The Winthrop Street area saw its earliest significant residential development between about 1830 and 1850, when the city experienced a construction boom following the decision to locate the state capitol and other major state facilities there. During this period, the two main roads became lined with houses, and some of the side streets were developed. Over the following century, development expanded to fill the undeveloped areas to the south and west, and along residential streets joining to other roads to the north and east. This development was spurred by the city's growth as an industrial and publishing center. Major development ended about 1915, with modest infill and redevelopment occurring in limited places within the district.

== See also ==
- National Register of Historic Places listings in Kennebec County, Maine
