= Weston House (disambiguation) =

Weston House was a Category I heritage building in Christchurch, New Zealand.

Weston House may also refer to:

- Ephraim Weston House, historic house in Reading, Massachusetts
- Jabez Weston House, historic house in Reading, Massachusetts
- John Henry Weston House, historic building in Cincinnati, Ohio

== See also ==
- Fuller-Weston House
- Kings Weston House
- Weston Homestead
- Weston Park Museum
