= Melville Fuller =

Chief Justice of the United States from 1888 to 1910

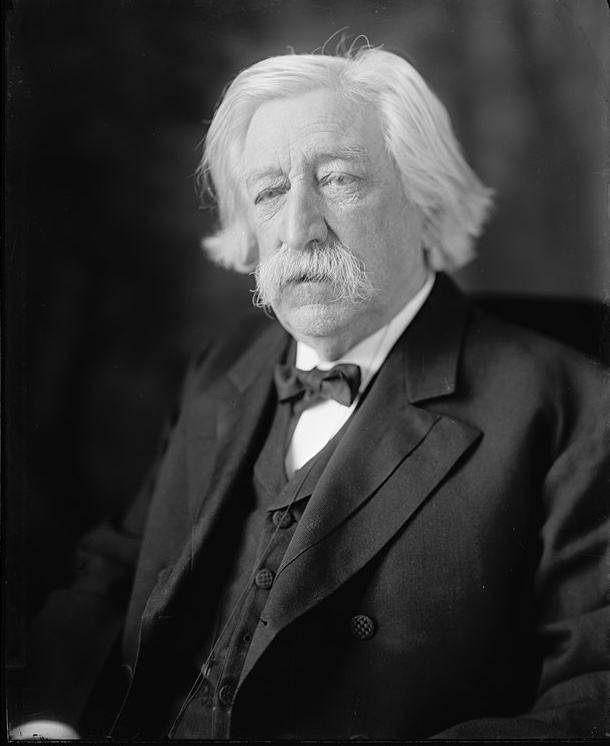
- Fuller, c. 1900–10

8th Chief Justice of the United States
- In office October 8, 1888 – July 4, 1910
- Nominated by: Grover Cleveland
- Preceded by: Morrison Waite
- Succeeded by: Edward Douglass White

Member of the Illinois House of Representatives
- In office 1863–1865

Personal details
- Born: Melville Weston Fuller; February 11, 1833 Augusta, Maine, U.S.
- Died: July 4, 1910 (aged 77) Sorrento, Maine, U.S.
- Resting place: Graceland Cemetery, Chicago, Illinois, U.S.
- Party: Democratic
- Spouses: Calista Reynolds (m. 1858; died 1864); Mary Coolbaugh (m. 1866; died 1904)
- Children: 10
- Education: Bowdoin College (AB); Harvard University

Melville Weston Fuller (February 11, 1833 – July 4, 1910) was an American politician, attorney, and jurist who served as the eighth chief justice of the United States from 1888 until his death in 1910. Staunch conservatism marked his tenure on the Supreme Court, exhibited by his tendency to support unfettered free enterprise and to oppose broad federal power. He wrote major opinions on the federal income tax, the Commerce Clause, and citizenship law, and he took part in important decisions about racial segregation and the liberty of contract. The rulings faced criticism during and after Fuller's tenure, and many were later overruled or abrogated. The legal academy has generally viewed Fuller negatively, although a revisionist minority has taken a more favorable view of his jurisprudence.

Born in Augusta, Maine, Fuller established a legal practice in Chicago after graduating from Bowdoin College. A Democrat, he became involved in politics and campaigned for Stephen A. Douglas in the 1860 presidential election. During the Civil War, he served a single term in the Illinois House of Representatives, where he opposed the policies of President Abraham Lincoln. Fuller became a prominent attorney in Chicago and was a delegate to several Democratic National Conventions. He declined three separate appointments offered by President Grover Cleveland before accepting Cleveland's nomination to succeed Morrison Waite as chief justice in 1888. Despite some voicing objections over his political past, Fuller was confirmed by the Senate. He served as chief justice until his death in 1910, gaining a reputation for collegiality and able administration.

Fuller's jurisprudence was conservative, focusing strongly on states' rights, limited federal power, and economic liberty. His majority opinion in Pollock v. Farmers' Loan & Trust Co. (1895) ruled a federal income tax to be unconstitutional; the Sixteenth Amendment later superseded the decision. Fuller's opinion in United States v. E. C. Knight Co. (1895) narrowly interpreted Congress's authority under the Commerce Clause, limiting the reach of the Sherman Act and making government prosecution of antitrust cases more difficult. In Lochner v. New York (1905), Fuller agreed with the majority that the Constitution forbade states from enforcing wage-and-hour restrictions on businesses, contending that the Due Process Clause prevents government infringement on one's liberty to control one's property and business affairs. Fuller joined the majority in Plessy v. Ferguson (1896), in which the Court articulated the doctrine of separate but equal and upheld Jim Crow laws. He argued in the Insular Cases that residents of the territories are entitled to constitutional rights, but he dissented when, in United States v. Wong Kim Ark (1898), the majority ruled in favor of birthright citizenship.

Many of Fuller's decisions did not stand the test of time. His views on economic liberty were squarely rejected by the Court during the New Deal era, and the Plessy opinion was unanimously reversed in Brown v. Board of Education (1954). Fuller's historical reputation has been generally unfavorable, with many scholars arguing that he was overly deferential to corporations and the wealthy. While a resurgence of conservative legal thought has brought Fuller new defenders, an increase in racial awareness has also led to new scrutiny of his vote in Plessy. In 2021, Kennebec County (Maine) commissioners voted unanimously to remove a statue of Fuller from public land with the aim of dissociating the county from racial segregation.

== Early life ==
Melville Weston Fuller was born on February 11, 1833, in Augusta, Maine, the second son of Frederick Augustus Fuller and his wife, Catherine Martin (née Weston). His maternal grandfather, Nathan Weston, served on the Supreme Court of Maine, and his paternal grandfather was a probate judge. His father practiced law in Augusta. Three months after Fuller was born, his mother sued successfully for divorce on grounds of adultery; she and her children moved into Judge Weston's home.

In 1849, the sixteen-year-old Fuller enrolled at Bowdoin College, from which he graduated Phi Beta Kappa in 1853. He studied law in an uncle's office before spending six months at Harvard Law School. While he did not receive a degree from Harvard, his attendance made him the first chief justice to have received formal academic legal training. Fuller was admitted to the Maine bar in 1855 and clerked for another uncle in Bangor. Later that year, he moved back to Augusta to become the editor of The Age, Maine's primary Democratic newspaper, in partnership with another uncle. Fuller was elected to Augusta's common council in March 1856, serving as the council's president and as the city solicitor.

== Early career ==
In 1856, Fuller left Maine for Chicago, Illinois. The city presented Fuller, a steadfast Democrat, with greater opportunities and a more favorable political climate. In addition, a broken engagement likely encouraged him to leave his hometown. Fuller accepted a position with a local law firm, and he also became involved in politics. Although Fuller opposed slavery, he considered it an issue for the states rather than the federal government. He supported the Kansas–Nebraska Act, which repealed the Missouri Compromise and allowed Kansas and Nebraska to determine the slavery issue themselves. Fuller opposed both abolitionists and secessionists, arguing instead for compromise. He campaigned for Stephen A. Douglas both in his successful 1858 Senate campaign against Abraham Lincoln and in his unsuccessful bid against Lincoln in the 1860 presidential election.

When the American Civil War broke out in 1861, Fuller supported military action against the Confederacy. However, he opposed the Lincoln Administration's handling of the war, and he decried many of Lincoln's actions as unconstitutional. Fuller was elected as a Democratic delegate to the failed 1862 Illinois state constitutional convention. He helped develop a gerrymandered system for congressional apportionment, and he joined his fellow Democrats in supporting provisions that prohibited African-Americans from voting or settling in the state. He also advocated for court reform and for banning banks from printing of paper money. Although the convention adopted many of his proposals, voters rejected the proposed constitution in June 1862.

In November 1862, Fuller was narrowly elected to a seat in the Illinois House of Representatives as a Democrat. He held his seat from 1863 until 1865. During this time, the majority-Democrat legislature clashed with Republican governor Richard Yates and opposed the wartime policies of President Lincoln. Fuller spoke in opposition to the Emancipation Proclamation, arguing that it violated state sovereignty. He supported the Corwin Amendment, which would have prevented the federal government from outlawing slavery. Fuller opposed Lincoln's decision to suspend the writ of habeas corpus, believing it violated civil liberties. Yates ultimately adjourned the legislature over the vehement objections of Fuller and the Democrats. The frustrated Fuller never sought legislative office again, although he continued taking part in Democratic party politics.

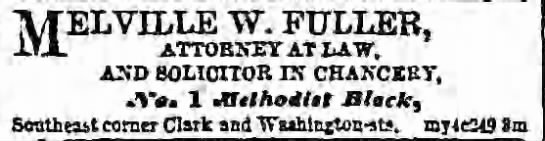
Advertisement for Fuller's law practice, printed in the Chicago Tribune, May 4, 1860

Fuller maintained a successful legal practice, arguing on behalf of many corporations and businessmen. He represented the city of Chicago in a land dispute with the Illinois Central Railroad. In 1869, he took on what became his most significant case: defending Chicago clergyman Charles E. Cheney, whom the Episcopal Church was attempting to remove because he disagreed with church teaching on baptismal regeneration. Believing the ecclesiastical court to be biased against Cheney, Fuller filed suit in the Cook County Superior Court, arguing that Cheney possessed a property right in his position. The Superior Court agreed and entered an injunction against the ecclesiastical court's proceedings. On appeal, the Supreme Court of Illinois reversed the injunction, holding that the civil courts could not review church disciplinary proceedings. The ecclesiastical court found Cheney guilty, but he refused to leave his pulpit. The matter returned to the courts, where Fuller argued that only the local congregation had the right to remove Cheney. The Supreme Court of Illinois ultimately agreed, holding that the congregation's property was not under the purview of Episcopal Church leadership. Fuller's defense of Cheney garnered him national prominence.

Beginning in 1871, Fuller also litigated before the Supreme Court of the United States, arguing numerous cases. His legal practice involved many areas of law, and he became one of Chicago's most highly paid lawyers. He remained involved in the politics of the Democratic Party, serving as a delegate to the party's national conventions in 1872, 1876, and 1880. Fuller supported a strict construction of the U.S. Constitution. He firmly opposed the printing of paper money, and he spoke out against the Supreme Court's 1884 decision in Juilliard v. Greenman upholding Congress's power to issue it. He was a supporter of states' rights and generally advocated for limited government. Fuller strongly supported President Grover Cleveland, a fellow Democrat, who agreed with many of his views. Cleveland successively attempted to appoint Fuller to chair the United States Civil Service Commission, to serve as Solicitor General, and to be a United States Pacific Railway Commissioner, but Fuller declined each nomination.

== Nomination to Supreme Court ==
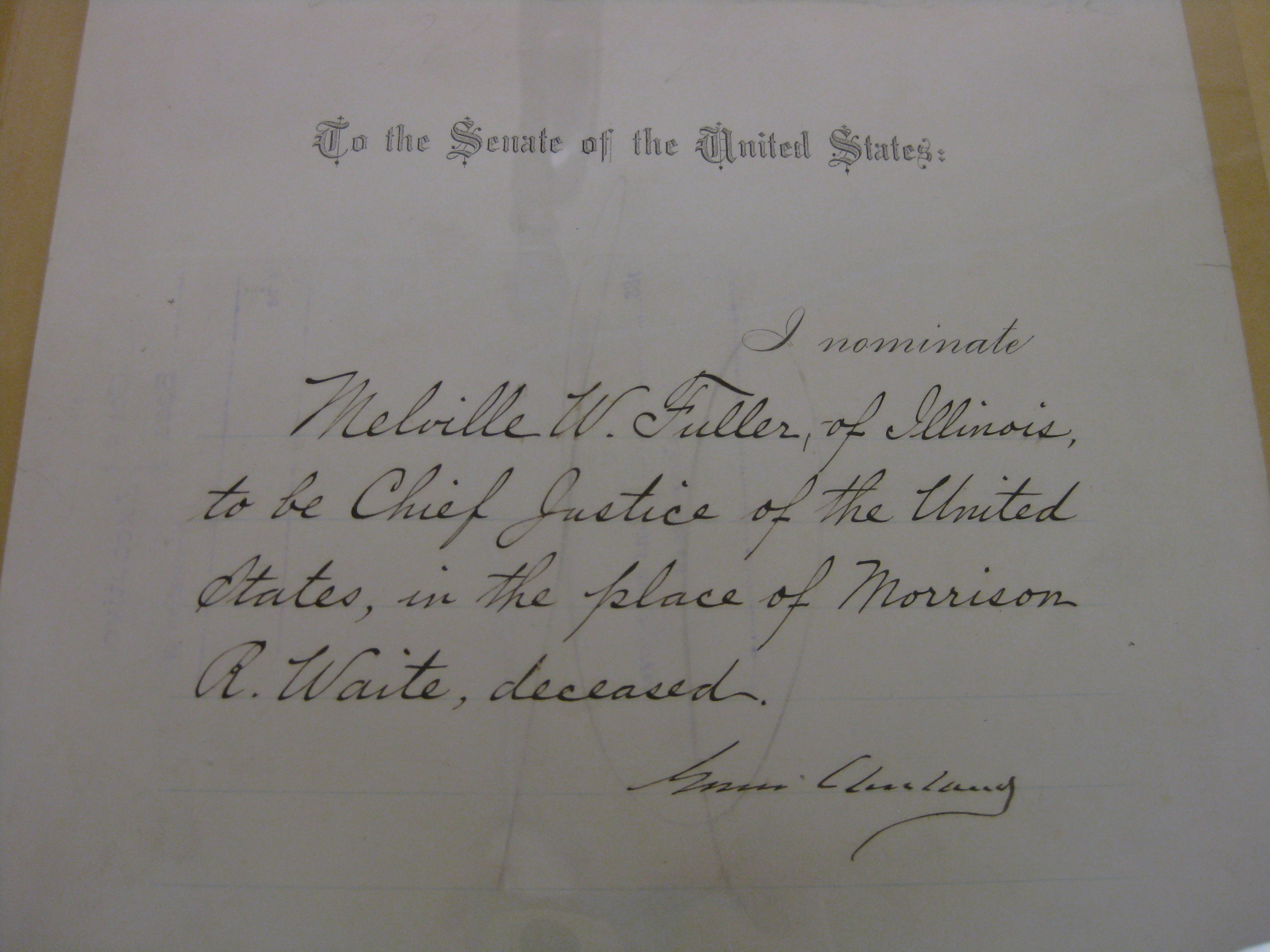
Fuller's chief justice nomination as signed by Grover Cleveland

On March 23, 1888, Chief Justice Morrison Waite died, creating a Supreme Court vacancy for President Cleveland to fill. The Senate was narrowly under Republican control, so it was necessary for Cleveland to nominate someone who could obtain bipartisan support. Cleveland also sought to appoint a candidate who was sixty years of age or younger, since an older nominee would likely be unable to serve for very long. He considered Vermont native Edward J. Phelps, the ambassador to the United Kingdom, but the politically influential Irish-American community, which viewed him as an Anglophile, opposed him. Furthermore, the sixty-six-year-old Phelps was thought to be too old for the job, and the Supreme Court already had one justice from New England. Senator George Gray was considered, but appointing him would create a vacancy in the closely divided Senate. Cleveland eventually decided that he wanted to appoint someone from Illinois, both for political reasons and because the court had no justices from the Seventh Circuit, which included Illinois. Fuller, who had become a confidant of Cleveland, encouraged the President to appoint John Scholfield, who served on the Illinois Supreme Court. Cleveland offered the position to Scholfield, but he declined, apparently because his wife was too rustic for urban life in Washington, D.C. Fuller was considered because of the efforts of his friends, many of whom had written letters to Cleveland in support of him. At fifty-five years old, Fuller was young enough for the position, and Cleveland approved of his reputation and political views. In addition, Illinois Republican senator Shelby Cullom expressed support, convincing Cleveland that Fuller would likely receive bipartisan support in the Senate. Cleveland thus offered Fuller the nomination, which he accepted reluctantly. Fuller was formally nominated on April 30.

Public reaction to Fuller's nomination was mixed: Some newspapers lauded his character and professional career, while others criticized his comparative obscurity and his lack of experience in the federal government. The nomination was referred to the Senate Judiciary Committee, chaired by Vermont Republican George F. Edmunds. Edmunds was displeased that his friend Phelps had not been appointed, so he delayed committee action and endeavored to sink Fuller's nomination. The Republicans seized upon Fuller's time in the Illinois Legislature, when he had opposed many of Lincoln's wartime policies. They portrayed him as a Copperhead – an anti-war Northern Democrat – and published a tract claiming that "[t]he records of the Illinois legislature of 1863 are black with Mr. Fuller's unworthy and unpatriotic conduct". Some Illinois Republicans, including Lincoln's son Robert, came to Fuller's defense, arguing that his actions were imprudent but not an indicator of disloyalty. Fuller's detractors claimed he would reverse the Supreme Court's ruling in the recent legal-tender case of Juilliard; his defenders replied he would be faithful to precedent. Vague allegations of professional improprieties were levied, but an investigation failed to substantiate them. The Judiciary Committee took no action on the nomination, and many believed that Edmunds was attempting to hold it off until after the 1888 presidential election. Cullom demanded an immediate vote, fearing that delay on Fuller's nomination could harm Republicans' prospects of winning Illinois. The committee reported the nomination without recommendation on July 2, 1888.

The full Senate took up Fuller's nomination on July 20. Several prominent Republican senators, including William M. Evarts of New York, William Morris Stewart of Nevada, and Edmunds, spoke against the nomination, arguing that Fuller was a disloyal Copperhead who would misinterpret the Reconstruction Amendments and roll back the progress made by the Civil War. Illinois's two Republican senators, Cullom and Charles B. Farwell defended Fuller's actions and character. Cullom read an anti-Lincoln speech that Phelps, Edmunds's choice for the position, had given. He accused Edmunds of hypocrisy and insincerity, saying he was simply resentful that Phelps had not been chosen. The Democratic senators did not participate in the debate, aiming to let the Republicans squabble among themselves. When the matter came to a vote, Fuller was confirmed 41 to 20, with 15 absences. Ten Republicans, including Republican National Committee chair Matthew Quay and two senators from Fuller's home state of Maine, joined the Democrats in supporting Fuller's nomination. Fuller took the judicial oath on October 8, 1888, formally becoming Chief Justice of the United States.

== Chief justice ==
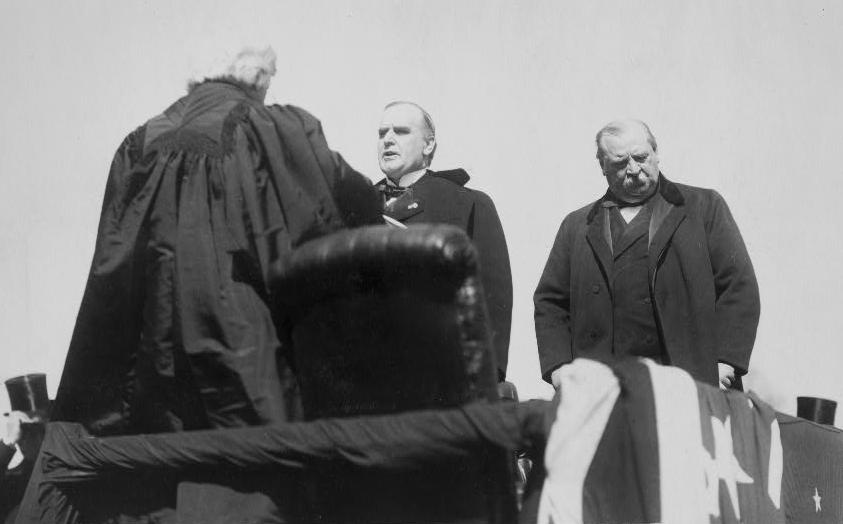
Chief Justice Fuller (left) administering the oath to William McKinley (center) as president on March 4, 1897. Outgoing president Grover Cleveland stands to the right.

Fuller served twenty-two years as chief justice, remaining in the center chair until his death in 1910. Although he lacked legal genius, his potent administrative skills made him a capable manager of the court's business. Hoping to increase the Court's collegiality, Fuller introduced the practice of the justices' shaking hands before their private conferences. He successfully maintained more-or-less cordial relationships among the justices, many of whom had large egos and difficult tempers. His collegiality notwithstanding, Fuller presided over a divided court: the justices split 5–4 sixty-four times during his tenure, more often than in subsequent years. Fuller himself, however, wrote few dissents, disagreeing with the majority in only 2.3 percent of cases. Fuller was the first chief justice to lobby Congress directly in support of legislation, successfully urging the adoption of the Circuit Courts of Appeals Act of 1891. The act established intermediate appellate courts, which reduced the Supreme Court's substantial backlog and allowed it to decide cases in a timely manner. As chief justice, Fuller was generally responsible for assigning the authorship of the court's majority opinions. He tended to use this power modestly, often assigning major cases to other justices while retaining duller ones for himself. According to legal historian Walter F. Pratt, Fuller's writing style was "nondescript"; his opinions were lengthy and contained numerous quotations. Justice Felix Frankfurter opined that Fuller was "not an opinion writer whom you read for literary enjoyment", while the scholar G. Edward White characterized his style as "diffident and not altogether successful".

In 1893, Cleveland offered to appoint Fuller to be secretary of state. He declined, saying he enjoyed his work as chief justice and contending that accepting a political appointment would harm the Supreme Court's reputation for impartiality. Remaining on the Court, he accepted a seat on an 1897 commission to arbitrate the Venezuelan boundary dispute, and he served ten years on the Permanent Court of Arbitration. Fuller's health declined after 1900, and scholar David Garrow suggests that his "growing enfeeblement" inhibited his work. In what biographer Willard King calls "[p]erhaps the worst year in the history of the Court" – the term from October 1909 to May 1910 – two justices died and one became fully incapacitated; Fuller's weakened state compounded the problem. Fuller died that July. President William Howard Taft nominated Associate Justice Edward Douglass White to replace him.

== Jurisprudence ==
Fuller's jurisprudence is generally identified as conservative. He favored states' rights over federal power, attempting to prevent the national government from asserting broad control over economic matters. Yet he was also skeptical of the states' powers: he agreed with the concept of substantive due process and used it to strike down state laws that, in his view, unduly encroached upon the free market. Fuller took no interest in preventing racial inequality, although his views on other civil rights issues were less definitive. Much of Fuller's jurisprudence has not stood the test of time: many of his decisions have been reversed by Congress or overruled by later Supreme Court majorities. Summarizing Fuller's views of the law, scholar Irving Schiffman wrote in 1969 that "he was a conservative, laissez-faire Justice, less reactionary than some of his brethren, more compassionate than others, but a spokesman for what now seems a far-off and bygone judicial age".

=== Federal power ===
==== Income tax ====
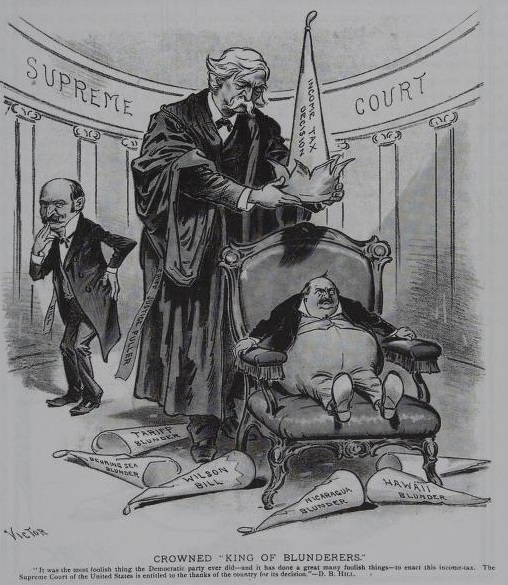
In this 1895 political cartoon, Fuller is depicted placing a dunce cap with the words "INCOME TAX DECISION" on President Cleveland, who had signed the tax into law. The cartoon appeared in the Judge magazine; it was accompanied by a quotation from Senator David B. Hill praising the Court's decision.

According to legal scholar Bernard Schwartz, Fuller's most noteworthy decision was his 1895 opinion in Pollock v. Farmers' Loan & Trust Co. In 1894, Congress passed the Wilson–Gorman Tariff Act, which contained a rider that levied a two-percent tax on incomes exceeding $4,000 a year. Since it imposed the nation's first peacetime income tax, this provision was deeply controversial, provoking acrimonious debate along geographic, societal, and political lines. Its challengers took the tax to court, where they argued that it was a direct tax that had not been apportioned evenly among the states, in violation of a provision of the Constitution. (In practice, apportioning income tax by state would be impossible, so a ruling on this basis would doom federal income taxes.) When the matter reached the Supreme Court, it unexpectedly agreed with the challengers and, by a 5–4 vote, struck down the income tax. The majority opinion, written by Fuller, held that the Framers intended the term "direct tax" to include property and that income was itself a form of property. Fuller thus ruled the entire act to be unconstitutional. The decision provoked withering criticism from each of the four dissenters, including a paroxysm of ire by Justice John Marshall Harlan that one scholar characterized as "one of the most spectacular displays ever staged by a member of the Court". Harlan wrote that the decision "strikes at the very foundation of national authority", while Justice Henry Billings Brown opined it "approaches the proportion of a national calamity". Each dissenter decried the majority's perceived infidelity to precedent.

The Pollock decision was distinctly unpopular. Much of the public questioned whether Fuller's constitutional analysis was truly in good faith: many felt that the Court was more committed to protecting the wealthy than to following any particular legal philosophy. Former Oregon governor Sylvester Pennoyer even called for the impeachment of the justices in the majority. While the public outcry soon waned, support for a federal income tax grew substantially in subsequent years. The Sixteenth Amendment to the U.S. Constitution, ratified in 1913, abrogated Pollock by allowing Congress to levy income taxes without apportionment; it marked only the third time in American history that a Supreme Court decision was reversed via constitutional amendment. However, the Supreme Court has never formally overruled Pollock's reasoning; to the contrary, Chief Justice John Roberts cited it in the 2012 Affordable Care Act case National Federation of Independent Business v. Sebelius. Law professor Erik M. Jensen noted in 2014 that most legal academics agree that Pollock was "obviously dead wrong"; scholar Calvin H. Johnson called the decision "a terrible example of judicial bad behavior" that should be "reverse[d] in full". Jensen takes a minority position, agreeing with Pollock and extending it to argue for the unconstitutionality of flat taxes and wealth taxes. In any event, Fuller's Pollock opinion remains relevant in contemporary public policy.

==== Interstate commerce ====
Fuller was suspicious of attempts to assert broad federal power over interstate commerce. Questions about the scope of Congress's Commerce Clause authority commonly arose in the context of the Sherman Act, a major 1890 federal antitrust law. In the first such case, United States v. E. C. Knight Co. (1895), Fuller led the Court in limiting the federal government's powers. The Department of Justice had filed suit under the Sherman Act against the American Sugar Refining Company, arguing that it was a monopoly because it controlled over ninety percent of the American sugar refining market. Writing for an eight-justice majority, Fuller concluded Congress could not proscribe such monopolies because they only implicated manufacturing and thus did not fall under the Commerce Clause. Stating that "[c]ommerce succeeds to manufacture and is not a part of it," he maintained that the sugar-refining trust had no direct impact on interstate commerce. Fuller feared that a broader interpretation of the Commerce Clause would impinge upon states' rights, and he thus held the Sugar Trust could only be broken up by the states in which it operated. The case displays Fuller's tendency to support a limited federal government. The legal academy generally views Knight as an unduly restrictive interpretation of the Commerce Clause, although legal scholar Richard Epstein has argued that it aligns with founding-era precedents. The Court's expansive Commerce Clause decisions during the New Deal period essentially abrogated Knight.

Fuller participated in several other major antitrust cases. In the 1904 case of Northern Securities Co. v. United States, a majority broke up the Northern Securities Company, a railroad holding company, believing it to be a monopoly. Fuller dissented, joining opinions written by Justices Edward Douglass White and Oliver Wendell Holmes Jr. The dissenters argued that simply holding stock in a company did not count as interstate commerce, and so they would have held that the Sherman Act did not apply to holding companies. The justices were unanimous in Swift & Co. v. United States (1905), which gave the Court's blessing to antitrust enforcement against meat-packing companies. Although meat-packing did not directly involve interstate commerce, the Court held that the Commerce Clause still applied because the meat products would eventually be sold across state lines. Citing Swift and other cases, legal historian James W. Ely has argued that Fuller was not opposed to federal antitrust laws per se, but only to expansive readings of the Commerce Clause. In another antitrust case, Loewe v. Lawlor (1908), Fuller wrote for a unanimous Court that labor unions were subject to the Sherman Act. The ruling was commonly thought to evince antipathy toward organized labor. Its broad interpretation of the antitrust laws appeared difficult to reconcile with Knight, and law professor David P. Currie wrote that the apparent contradiction "suggests that [Fuller] may not have been guided exclusively by neutral legal principles".

Fuller's attempts to limit the national government's power did not always meet with the support of his fellow justices. He dissented from the Court's 1903 decision in Champion v. Ames, in which five justices upheld a federal ban on transporting lottery tickets across state lines. In his opinion, Fuller demurred that the majority's reasoning gave Congress "the absolute and exclusive power to prohibit the transportation of anything or anybody from one state to another. He feared that the law violated the principles of federalism and states' rights protected by the Tenth Amendment. The ruling in Ames was among the first to grant the federal government a de facto police power to protect the welfare of the public. It proved a historically significant step toward expanding congressional authority, and legal scholar John Semonche wrote that by resisting it, Fuller "sought to put his finger in the dike". The chief justice also dissented in McCray v. United States, a 1904 case that approved the use of the federal taxing power for regulatory purposes. McCray effectively allowed Congress to regulate intrastate commercial activity by simply levying taxes on it; the decision curtailed Fuller's opinion in Knight and showed his support for federalism could not always garner the support of a majority of the Court.

=== Substantive due process ===
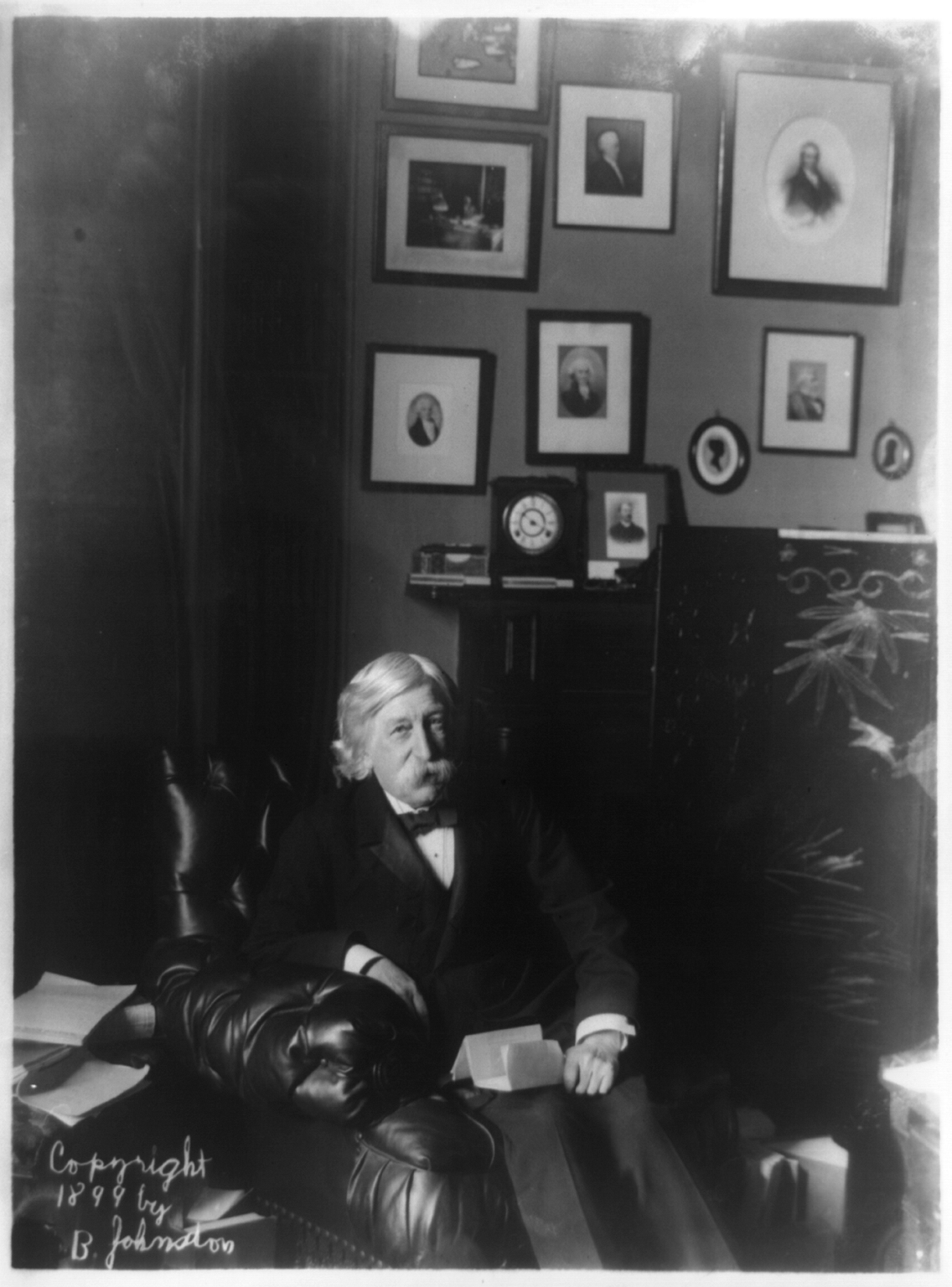
Fuller in his Supreme Court chambers, circa 1899

Fuller's tenure on the Supreme Court, in the words of Schiffman, "witnessed the final passing of judicial tolerance of legislative experimentation and the final acceptance of the doctrine of substantive due process". Soon after his arrival on the Court, the chief justice began joining with his colleagues to gradually erode the states' powers to regulate economic activity. In Chicago, Milwaukee & St. Paul Railway Co. v. Minnesota (1890), for instance, Fuller and five other justices voted to strike down the railroad rates set by a Minnesota commission. The ruling held that the Due Process Clause contained a substantive component that subjected the states' regulatory decisions to judicial review. With Fuller's support, the Court in Allgeyer v. Louisiana (1897) unanimously expanded that component, concluding the Due Process Clause protected a right to enter into contracts. Allgeyer was the first case in the Court's history in which a state law was struck down on freedom-of-contract grounds, and its implications stretched well beyond the insurance context in which it arose. According to Semonche, the decision heralded a "new and sweeping" interpretation of the Due Process Clause "that would haunt the Justices and American society for the next four decades".

The era of substantive due process reached its zenith in the 1905 case of Lochner v. New York. Lochner involved a New York law that capped hours for bakery workers at sixty hours a week. In a decision widely viewed to be among the Supreme Court's worst, a five-justice majority held the law to be unconstitutional under the Due Process Clause. The opinion, written by Justice Rufus W. Peckham and joined by Fuller, maintained that the liberty protected by that clause included a right to enter labor contracts without being subject to unreasonable governmental regulation. Peckham rejected the state's argument that the law was intended to protect workers' health, citing the "common understanding" that baking was not unhealthy. He maintained that bakers could protect their own health, arguing that the law was in fact a labor regulation in disguise. In a now-famous dissent, Justice Holmes accused the majority of substituting its own economic opinions for the requirements of the Constitution. Most scholars agree that the majority in Lochner engaged in judicial activism, substituting its own views for those of the democratically elected branches of government. The Fuller Court was not exclusively hostile to labor regulation: in Muller v. Oregon (1908), for example, it unanimously upheld an Oregon law capping women's working hours at ten hours a day. Nonetheless, Fuller's decision to join the majority in the Lochner case, which the Court ultimately abandoned in West Coast Hotel Co. v. Parrish (1937), is a major reason for the low estimation in which history has held him.

=== Judicial authority ===
Because of his support for property rights, Fuller favored a broad conception of the judicial role, endorsing doctrinal developments that expanded the federal courts' power to issue injunctions. In the case of In re Debs (1895), for instance, Fuller and his fellow justices bolstered the judiciary's authority to enjoin deprivations of public rights. The case stemmed from an 1894 strike by the American Railway Union against the Pullman Company. A Chicago federal court issued an injunction against the union's leaders, ordering them to stop facilitating the strike. Union president Eugene V. Debs and other union officials defied the order, and the court sentenced them to prison for contempt. Debs challenged the conviction before the Supreme Court, but it unanimously denied him relief. Broadly construing the federal government's powers, the Court held the judicial branch had the power to enjoin anything that obstructed interstate commerce. The Debs case opened the door to injunctions in labor cases, and it substantially expanded the courts' equitable authority. The case of Ex parte Young (1908) similarly demonstrated Fuller's support for extending the courts' ability to issue injunctions. The case involved the Eleventh Amendment, which proscribes the federal courts from hearing lawsuits brought against states. In Young, Fuller and seven other justices endorsed a way to sidestep that prohibition: suing an official of the state instead of the state itself. The landmark decision aided the Fuller Court in its quest to strike down state economic regulations, but its reasoning has permitted the federal judiciary to hear challenges to state laws in a wide variety of other contexts. Although some modern scholars have criticized the ruling in Young, attorney Rochelle Bobroff noted in 2009 that it "remains one of the most powerful tools to compel states to comply with federal law". Ely characterized the decision as "a milestone in the Fuller Court's transformation of federal judicial power", and legal historian Edward A. Purcell Jr. said that it "helped create a newly powerful and activist federal judiciary that emerged at the turn of the twentieth century and continued to operate into the twenty-first".

Fuller wrote the majority opinion in United States v. Shipp (1909), a singular decision in which the justices insisted that the authority of the Court be heeded. A Tennessee court sentenced Ed Johnson, an African-American man, to death for rape. His attorneys petitioned the Supreme Court for relief, arguing that racial bias had tainted the jury pool and that the threat of mob violence made the venue unfair. The Court agreed to issue a stay of execution, which prevented the death sentence from being carried out pending a ruling on Johnson's appeal. But John Shipp, the sheriff, removed almost all the guards from Johnson's prison, allowing a lynch mob to enter the jail and kill Johnson. Shipp, his deputies, and members of the mob were charged with contempt of court on the basis that they had spurned the Court's stay order. In the only criminal trial conducted in the Supreme Court's history, the justices sat as a jury to determine the defendants' guilt. Fuller, writing for a five-justice majority, found Shipp and several other defendants guilty of contempt. In his opinion, the chief justice wrote Shipp had "not only made the work of the mob easy, but in effect aided and abetted it", acting "in utter disregard of this court's mandate and in defiance of this court's orders". While the decision did not signal a sudden benevolence toward civil rights claims, Mark Curriden and Leroy Phillips write it constituted "the only proactive step the U.S. Supreme Court has ever taken to combat mob rule directly and demand that the public respect its authority and the authority of the rule of law".

=== Race ===
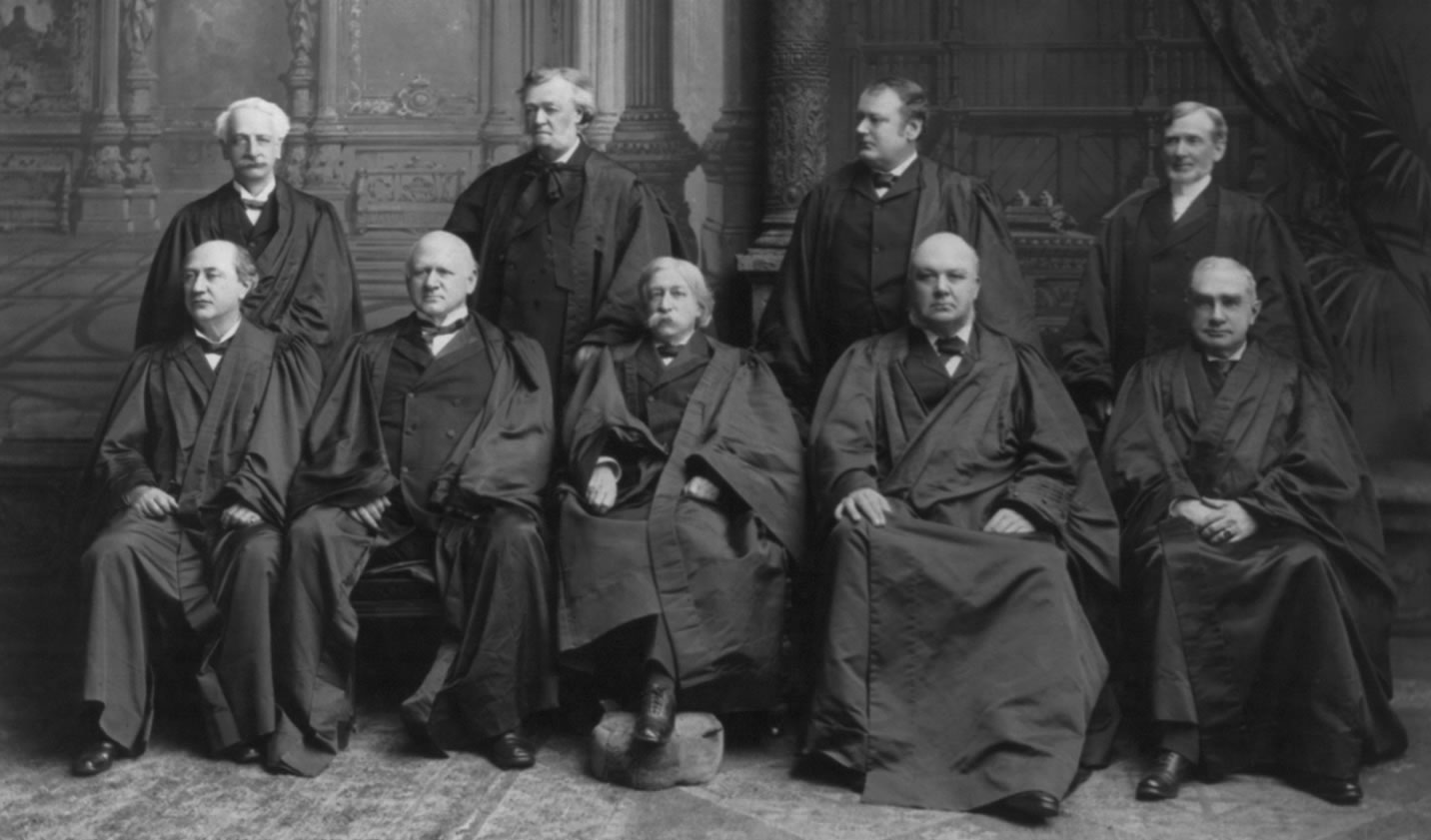
The Fuller Court in 1899

In the words of legal scholar John V. Orth, Fuller "preside[d] comfortably over a Court that turned a blind eye to racial injustice". In the infamous case of Plessy v. Ferguson (1896), he joined six of his colleagues in upholding a Louisiana law that required the racial segregation of railroad passengers. The majority opinion, penned by Justice Brown, rejected the claim that the law violated the Equal Protection Clause, maintaining instead that "separate but equal" distinctions were constitutional. Citing "the nature of things", the majority asserted that equal protection did not require the "commingling" of blacks and whites. Brown also argued that the Louisiana law did not suggest that blacks were inferior, stating that it was based on "the established usages, customs and traditions of the people". Justice Harlan dissented, using in the process the now-famous phrase "Our Constitution is color-blind." The Plessy decision placed the Court's imprimatur on Jim Crow laws. It instituted a half-century of what Louis H. Pollak called "humiliation-by-law", which continued until the Court reversed course in Brown v. Board of Education (1954). Fuller's decision to join the majority in Plessy has contributed significantly to his poor historical reputation.

The Fuller Court was no more liberal in other cases involving race: to the contrary, it curtailed even the limited progress toward equality made under Fuller's predecessors. For instance, Fuller joined the unanimous majority in Williams v. Mississippi (1898), which rejected a challenge to poll taxes and literacy tests that in effect disenfranchised Mississippi's African-American population. Even though a lower court had admitted the arrangement was intended "to obstruct the exercise of suffrage by the negro race", the Supreme Court refused to strike it down, reasoning that the provisions passed constitutional muster because they did not explicitly single out African-Americans. The Williams majority distanced itself from the Court's previous ruling in Yick Wo v. Hopkins (1886), in which the Waite Court had struck down a law that, while neutral on its face, discriminated against a racial minority. In a 2021 book, Vernon Burton and Armand Derfner characterized Williams as one "of the most disgraceful decisions in Supreme Court history", writing it "abandoned Yick Wo" and "erased the Fifteenth Amendment".

Fuller was among the seven justices who joined the majority opinion in Berea College v. Kentucky (1908), a segregation case in which the Court refused to apply its freedom-of-contract principles in defense of racial equality. The decision involved the Commonwealth of Kentucky's Day Law, which required private colleges to segregate their students. In its challenge to the statute, Berea College cited Lochner and other similar cases to argue the law was "an arbitrary interference with the rights of the people in the conduct of their private business and in the pursuit of their ordinary occupations". Such reasoning seemed likely to persuade the Court, given its history of striking down laws that interfered with the business decisions of private entities. But the justices were not convinced, upholding the law on the basis that, because corporations had no right to be granted a charter, states could impose otherwise unconstitutional restrictions on them. Again dissenting, Justice Harlan criticized the law's infringement on the economic-freedom principles that the Court had articulated in other cases. The majority's reasoning stood in conspicuous conflict with its support for corporate rights in other contexts and Donald Lively wrote the ruling "illuminated the evolving duality of Fourteenth Amendment standards".

=== Citizenship, immigration, and the territories ===
As a result of the Spanish–American War, the United States took control of Puerto Rico and the Philippines, raising knotty legal issues about their status under the Constitution. The Supreme Court addressed these disputes in a series of rulings in the so-called Insular Cases. In Downes v. Bidwell (1901), a fractured Court ruled 5–4 that the people living in the territories were not entitled to the rights guaranteed by the Constitution. Fuller, writing for the four dissenters, argued that Congress had no power to hold the territories "like a disembodied shade" free from all constitutional limits. He contended that the Constitution could not tolerate unrestricted congressional power over the territories, writing that it rejected that proposition in a way "too plain and unambiguous to permit its meaning to be thus influenced". Fuller's opinion was in line both with his strict-constructionist views and his party's opposition to American imperialism. While the Court has never adopted Fuller's position, scholars such as Juan R. Torruella have argued that it correctly interpreted the Constitution.

Fuller joined the majority in another of the Insular Cases: DeLima v. Bidwell (1901). The Court held – again by a 5–4 vote – that Puerto Rico did not constitute a foreign country for purposes of federal tariff law. Put together, Downes and DeLima meant that the territories were neither domestic nor foreign under American law. The Court was similarly unclear in Gonzales v. Williams (1904). In a unanimous opinion by Fuller, the Justices ruled that Puerto Ricans were not aliens under federal law, but they refused to decide whether the people of Puerto Rico were American citizens. In Late Corporation of the Church of Jesus Christ of Latter-Day Saints v. United States (1890), a case involving Congress's power over the Utah Territory, a six-justice majority upheld an anti-polygamy law that dissolved the charter of the Church of Jesus Christ of Latter-day Saints and seized its property. Fuller penned a dissent, in which he maintained that Congress had no authority to order the confiscation of property. Rejecting the majority's broader interpretation of federal power, Fuller expressed fear that the decision would afford Congress "absolute power" over the denizens of the territories. Ultimately, Fuller's position was vindicated: Congress later passed a joint resolution restoring the church's property.

Fuller was rarely amenable to the claims of Chinese immigrants. In the 1889 Chinese Exclusion Case, for instance, he joined Justice Stephen Field's opinion that unanimously rejected a challenge to the Chinese Exclusion Act. Although treaties with China allowed for immigration, the Court held that Congress was not bound by them, ruling that the Act abrogated all treaty obligations to the contrary. In Fong Yue Ting v. United States (1893), a majority held Congress had total authority over aliens and that they could be expelled on any basis. Three justices, including Fuller, dissented, arguing that aliens were at least entitled to some Constitutional protections. According to Ely, Fuller's dissent shows that he "occasionally demonstrated concern over civil liberties". But he also dissented in United States v. Wong Kim Ark (1898), in which the Court ruled that the Fourteenth Amendment ensured birthright citizenship – automatic citizenship for all children born on American soil. Writing for himself and Justice Harlan, Fuller claimed Chinese aliens were not "subject to the jurisdiction" of the United States because they retained allegiance to the Chinese emperor. Based on that fact, he concluded their children had no claim to American citizenship. The Wong Kim Ark decision has taken on additional significance as prominent Republican politicians, including Donald Trump, have called for the reversal of birthright citizenship.

== Personal life ==
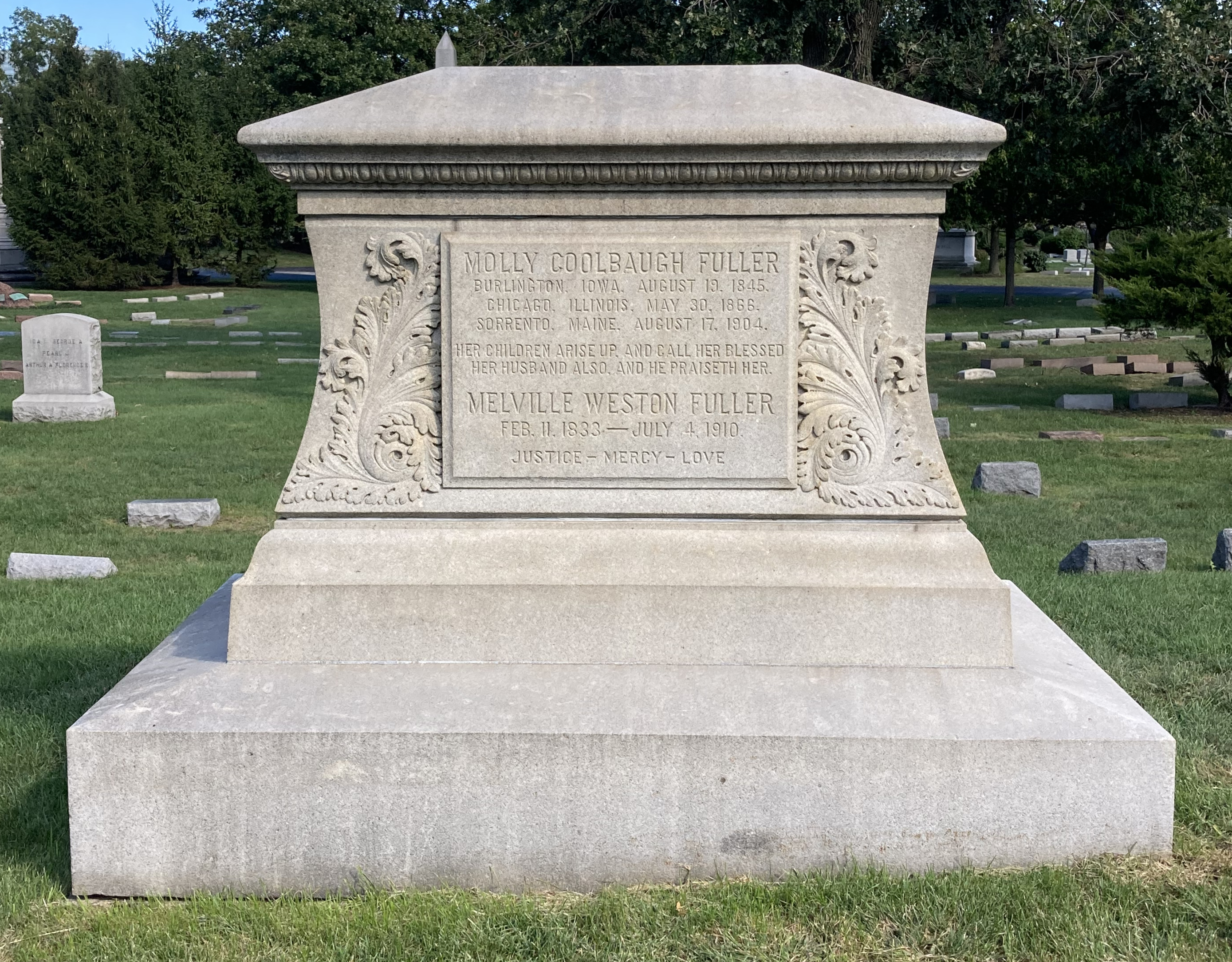
Fuller's grave at Graceland Cemetery

Fuller was married twice, first to Calista Reynolds, whom he wed in 1858. They had two children before she died of tuberculosis in 1864. Fuller remarried in 1866, wedding Mary Ellen Coolbaugh, the daughter of William F. Coolbaugh. The couple had an additional eight children, and they remained married until her death in 1904. A member of the Chicago Literary Club, Fuller was interested in poetry and other forms of literature; his personal library held over six thousand books.

During his confirmation, Fuller's mustache produced what law professor Todd Peppers called "a curious national anxiety". No Chief Justice had ever before had a mustache, and numerous newspapers debated the propriety of Fuller's facial hair. The New York Sun praised it as "uncommonly luxuriant and beautiful", while the Jackson Standard quipped that "Fuller's mustache is a good quality for a Democratic politician—it shuts his mouth." After Fuller's confirmation, the Sun switched course: it denounced his "deplorable moustaches", speculating they would distract attorneys and "detract from the dignity" of the Court. The column triggered further debate in the nation's newspapers, with much of the press coming to Fuller's defense. The commentary notwithstanding, Fuller kept the mustache.

== Death ==
While at his summer home in Sorrento, Maine, Fuller died on July 4, 1910, of a heart attack. Upon hearing of his death, President Taft praised Fuller as "a great judge"; Theodore Roosevelt said "I admired the Chief Justice as a fearless and upright judge, and I was exceedingly attached to him personally." James E. Freeman, who later served as the Episcopal Bishop of Washington, conducted the funeral service. Fuller was buried at Graceland Cemetery in Chicago.

== Legacy ==
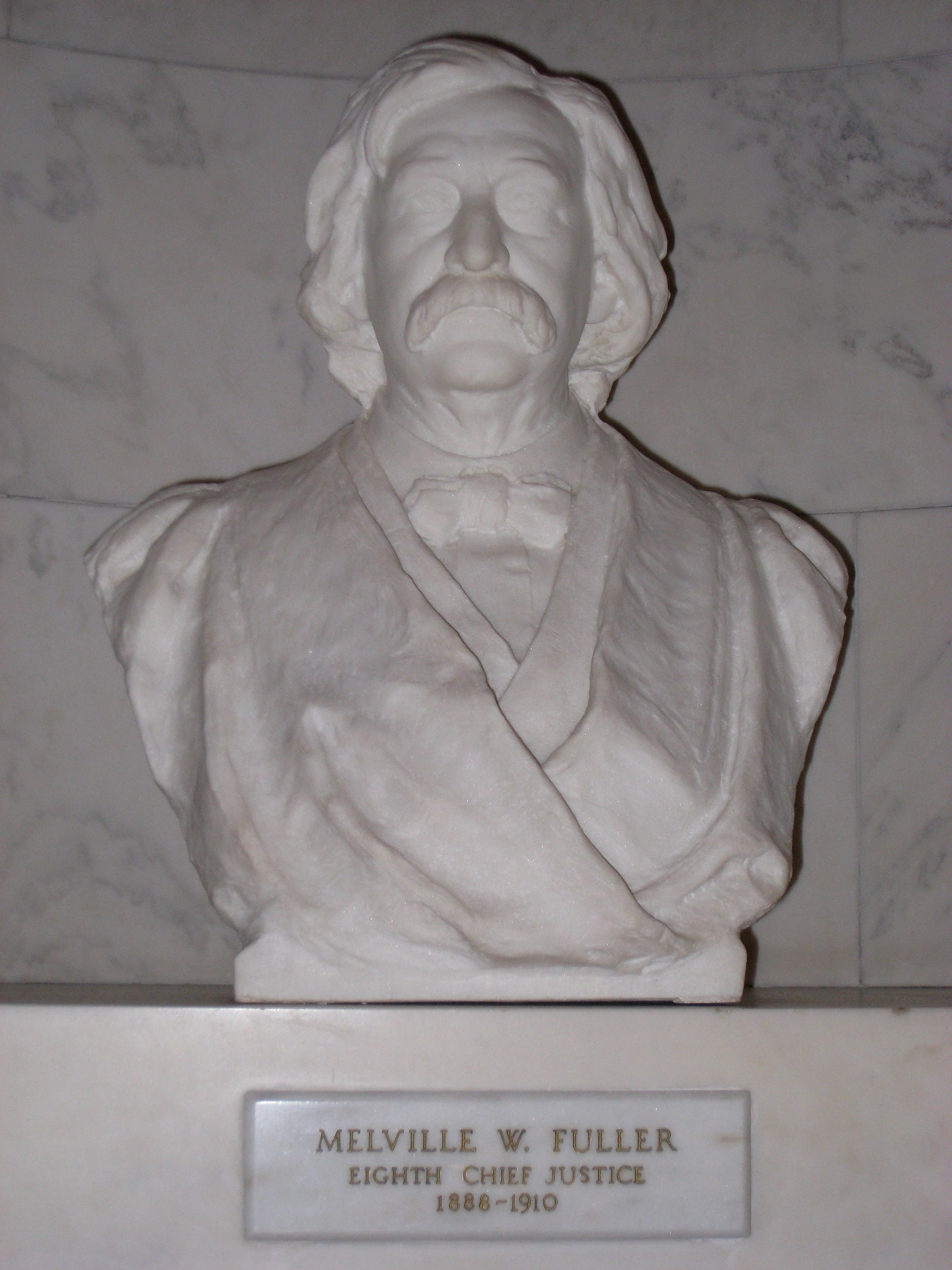
A bust of Fuller, displayed at the U.S. Supreme Court

Fuller's time on the Supreme Court has often been roundly criticized or overlooked altogether. His support of the widely execrated Plessy and Lochner decisions has been particularly responsible for his low historical reputation. Many Fuller Court decisions were later overruled; its positions on economic regulation and labor fared particularly poorly. Fuller's rulings were often favorable to corporations, and some scholars have claimed that the Fuller Court was biased towards big business and against the working class. Fuller wrote few consequential majority opinions, leading Yale professor John P. Frank to remark that "[i]f the measure of distinction is influence on the life of our own times, Fuller's score is as close to zero as any man's could be who held his high office so long". In addition, as William Rehnquist – himself a chief justice – noted, Fuller's more assertive colleagues Holmes and Harlan overshadowed him in the eyes of history. Yet the Fuller Court's jurisprudence was also a key source of the legal academy's criticism. Asserting that its justices "ignored the Fundamental Law", Princeton professor Alpheus T. Mason argued that "[t]he tribunal Fuller headed was a body dominated by fear—the fear of populists, of socialists, and communists, of numbers, majorities and democracy".

However, the growth of conservative legal thought in the late 20th century has brought Fuller new supporters. A 1993 survey of judges and legal academics found that Fuller's reputation, while still categorized as "average", had risen from the level recorded in a 1970 assessment. In a 1995 book, James W. Ely argued that the traditional criticisms of the Fuller Court are flawed, maintaining that its decisions were based on principle instead of partisanship. He noted that Fuller and his fellow justices rendered rulings that generally conformed with contemporaneous public opinion. Both Bruce Ackerman and Howard Gillman defended the Fuller Court on similar grounds, arguing that the justices' decisions fit in with the era's zeitgeist. Lawrence Reed of the Mackinac Center for Public Policy wrote in 2006 that Fuller was "a model Chief Justice", favorably citing his economic jurisprudence. While these revisionist ideas have become influential in the scholarly academy, they have not attained universal support: many academics continue to favor more critical views of the Fuller Court. Yale professor Owen M. Fiss, himself sympathetic to the revisionists' views, noted in 1993 that "by all accounts", the Fuller Court "ranks among the worst". In a 1998 review of Ely's book, law professor John Cary Sims argued that Fuller and his fellow justices failed to fulfill their obligation to go "against the prevailing political winds" instead of simply deferring to the majority. George Skouras, writing in 2011, rejected the ideas of Ely, Ackerman, and Gillman, agreeing instead with the Progressive argument that the Fuller Court favored corporations over vulnerable Americans. Fuller's legacy came under substantial scrutiny amidst racial unrest in 2020, with many condemning him for his vote in Plessy.

=== Statue ===
In 2013, a statue of Fuller, donated by a cousin, was installed on the lawn in front of Augusta's Kennebec County Courthouse. With Black Lives Matter protests and other attention in 2020, focus on the Plessy decision led to debate about the appropriateness of the statue's placement. In August 2020, the Maine Supreme Judicial Court requested that the statue be removed, citing Plessy. Kennebec County commissioners held a public hearing in December; a majority of participants favored the statue's removal. In February 2021, the county commissioners voted unanimously to move the statue from county property, citing a desire to dissociate the county from racial segregation. Commissioners appointed a committee to identify a new home for the statue. In April 2021, the original donor offered to take the statue back, agreeing to pay the costs for removing it. County commissioners accepted the offer later that month; they agreed that the statue could remain in front of the courthouse for up to a year while the original donor attempted to find a new location where it can be displayed. In February 2022, the statue was removed and placed in storage.

== See also ==
- Demographics of the Supreme Court of the United States
- Fuller Park, a community area of Chicago, named for him.
- Fuller-Weston House, historic home in Augusta, Maine, where Fuller lived
- List of justices of the Supreme Court of the United States
- List of law clerks for the chief justice of the United States
- List of United States Supreme Court justices by time in office

Legal offices
Preceded by Morrison Waite	Chief Justice of the United States; 1888–1910	Succeeded by Edward White
