= Samuel Bancroft House =

Historic house in Massachusetts, United States

- U.S. National Register of Historic Places
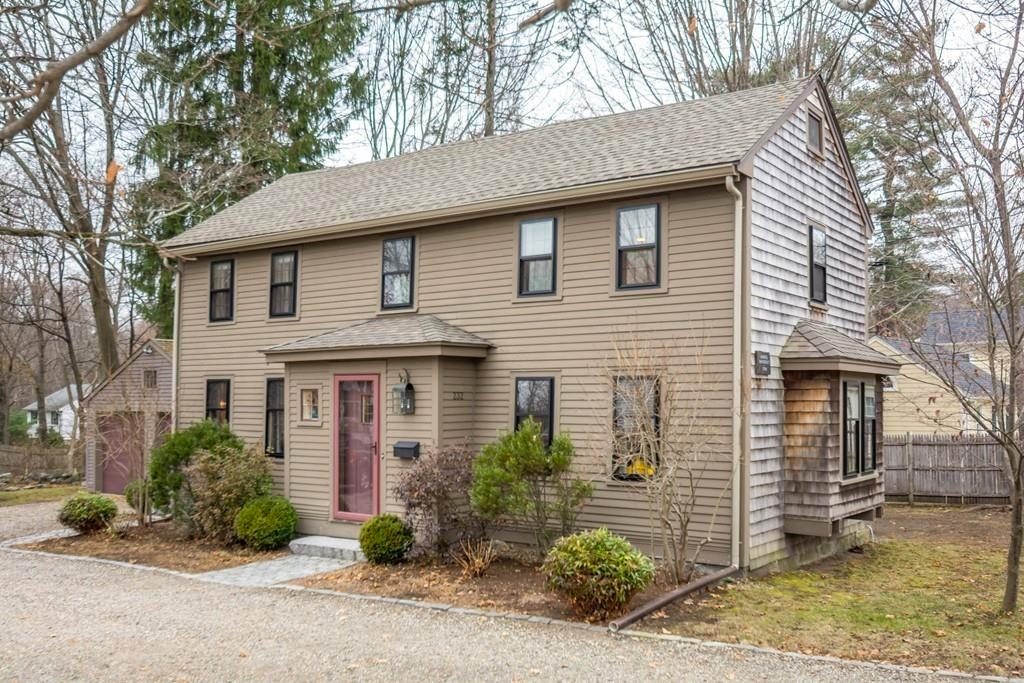
- Location: 232 West St., Reading, Massachusetts
- Built: 1748
- Architectural style: Georgian
- MPS: Reading MRA
- NRHP reference No.: 84002471
- Added to NRHP: July 19, 1984

The Samuel Bancroft House is a historic house in Reading, Massachusetts. With an estimated construction date of 1748, it is one of the town's older surviving houses, and one of a small number from the late colonial period. It was listed on the National Register of Historic Places in 1984.

== Description and history ==
The Samuel Bancroft House stands in a residential area of western Reading, on the west side of West Street a short way north of its junction with Wescroft Road. Unlike later infill residential construction which surrounds it, the house is oriented with its main facade facing south instead of toward the street. It is a 2 1/2-story wood-frame structure, with a gabled roof and exterior of clapboards (on the front) and wooden shingles (on the sides and rear). It has a symmetrical five-bay facade, with a center entrance that is sheltered by a 20th-century hip-roofed vestibule. The second-floor windows are set high, butting against the top plate in a typical Georgian fashion. The right side has a 20th-century bay window replacing one of the window bays.

The house was built about 1748, and may incorporate portions of an even older building. It was built by Samuel Bancroft, a locally prominent civic leader, who purchased the property, then extending all the way to County Road, in 1748. The house was later owned by Ephraim Weston, a businessman who built another house nearby and turned this house over to his son. It is the oldest home located in Reading's West Street Historic District.

== See also ==
- National Register of Historic Places listings in Reading, Massachusetts
- National Register of Historic Places listings in Middlesex County, Massachusetts
