= Tappan-Viles House =

Historic house in Maine, United States

- U.S. National Register of Historic Places
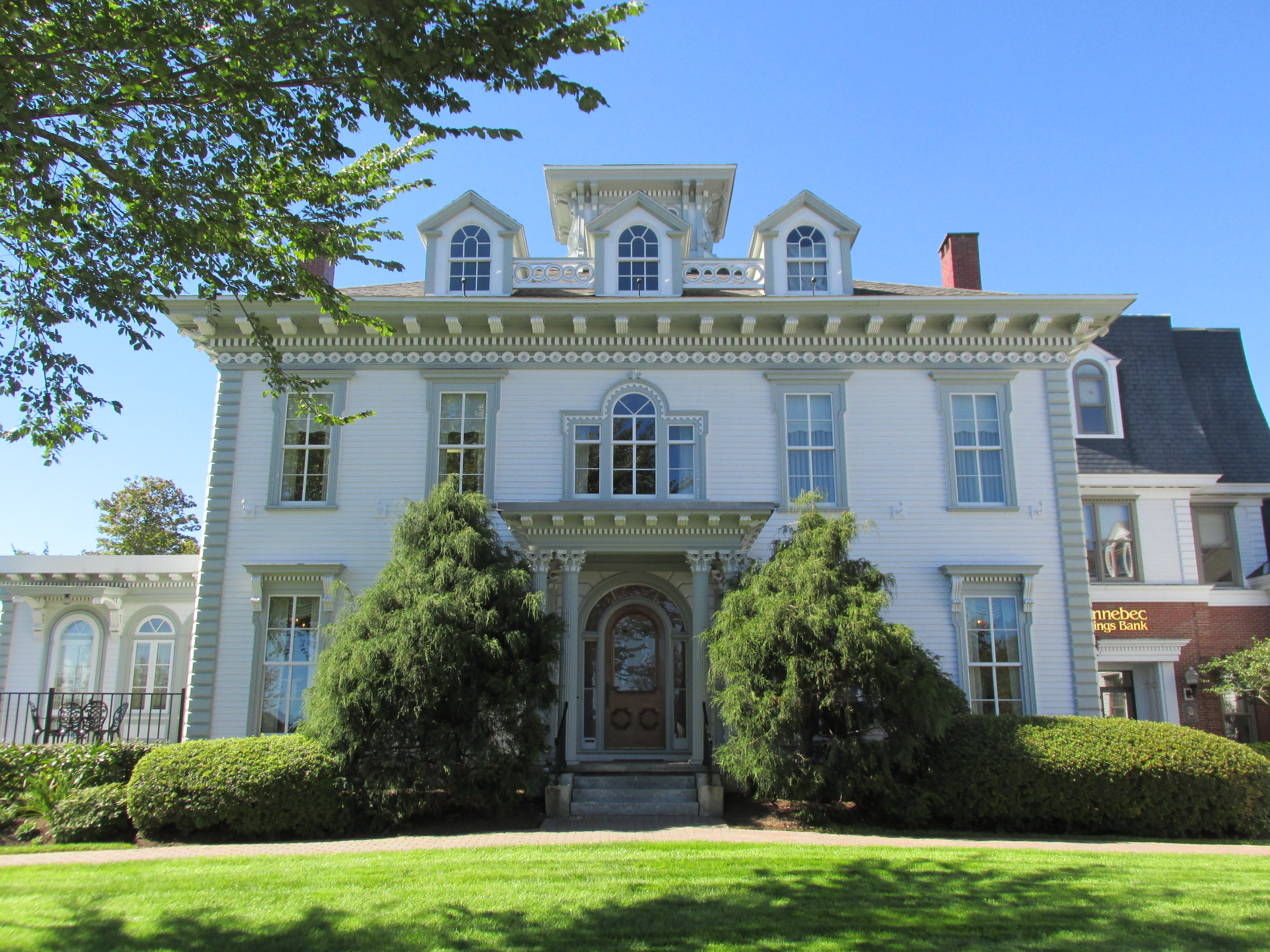

- Location within Maine
- Location: 150 State St., Augusta, Maine
- Coordinates: 44°18′40″N 69°46′48″W
- Area: 0.5 acres (0.20 ha)
- Built: 1816
- Architect: John Calvin Stevens
- Architectural style: Federal; Italianate; Colonial Revival
- NRHP reference No.: 82000759
- Added to NRHP: February 11, 1982

The Tappan-Viles House is a historic house at 150 State Street in Augusta, Maine. It was built in 1816 and restyled several times. The house exhibits an eclectic combination of Federal, Italianate, and Colonial Revival styles, the latter contributed by architect John Calvin Stevens. The house was listed on the National Register of Historic Places in 1982. It is now part of Kennebec Savings Bank's Augusta Branch.

== Description and history ==
The Tappan-Viles House stands on the west side of State Street, a short way north of Augusta state capitol district. It is located on a parcel that now also includes attached modern facilities of the Kennebec Savings Bank. It is a 2 1/2-story wood-frame structure, with a hip roof topped by a cupola, clapboarded walls, interior end chimneys, and a granite foundation.

The roof cornice is dentillated (row of tooth-like blocks) and studded with brackets, and the building corners are quoined (i.e., building corners are visually reinforced with prominent blocks). The front facade is five bays wide, with the central entrance sheltered by an elaborate porch supported by paired Corinthian columns. Windows on the first floor have decorative bracketed and dentillated cornices, while those on the second floor have simpler hoods. Above the main entrance is a Palladian window.

The house was built in 1816 by Rev. Benjamin Tappan, a Harvard College graduate who served as pastor at the South Parish Church. As built, it would have had modest Federal period trim.

In 1862, the house was acquired by Col. Alanson B. Farwell, who updated the house with the latest Italianate style, adding the bracketing, quoining, and cupola. Dr. William Graves, the next owner, in about 1915 hired the noted Portland architect John Calvin Stevens to design sympathetic Colonial Revival features. Another 20th-century owner was Blaine S. Viles, a mayor of Augusta and state forest commissioner. The building has since the late 20th century been used for commercial purposes.

== See also ==
- National Register of Historic Places listings in Kennebec County, Maine
