= Calvin H. Johnson =

American tax lawyer, author, and academic

- Occupations: Tax lawyer, author, and academic

Academic background
- Education: Columbia College (BA); Stanford Law School (JD)

Calvin H. Johnson is an American tax lawyer, author, and academic. He holds the John T. Kipp Chair Emeritus at the University of Texas School of Law.

Johnson's scholarship is in the fields of tax law and Constitutional history. His academic tax work has focused on defending the fairness, and efficiency of the tax base. In constitutional history, he relies on the original sources, usually to defend the plenary reach of the Federal government. He is the author of Righteous Anger at the Wicked States: The Meaning of the Founders' Constitution.

== Education and early career ==
Johnson earned a B.A. in Philosophy from Columbia College in 1966, and received a Purple Heart for combat in an infantry reconnaissance unit in Vietnam in 1968. He earned a Juris Doctor from Stanford Law School in 1971 and practiced with Paul, Weiss, Goldberg, Rifkind, and Garrison in the tax department in New York City from 1971 to 1973. Following this he served in the U.S. Treasury, Office of Tax Legislative Council, from 1973 to 1975.

== Career ==
Johnson began his academic career in 1975 as an assistant professor, then associate professor at Rutgers Law School, Newark. He joined the University of Texas School of Law in 1981 as a professor. He now serves as a John T. Kipp Chair in Business and Corporate Law Emeritus at the University of Texas.

Johnson was a Fellow of the Tax Policy Center (joint program of Urban Institute and Brookings Institution) in 2011, a visiting professor at the Office of Chief Counsel, IRS, in 2007, a Member of the Academic Advisers on the Overall Health of the Tax System for the Joint Committee on Taxation in 2001, a Dean's Distinguished Visitor at Vanderbilt Law School in 2000, a Member of the IRS Commissioner's Advisory Group in 1989 and a Guest Scholar at The Brookings Institution in 1980.

== Research ==
=== Tax law ===
Johnson's primary field is tax law, where he has published over 200 articles. In litigation, Johnson's brief in "Thor Power Tool v. Commissioner" in 1977 appeared to provide the rationale and outline for the Supreme Court's opinion, which held that tax law was not governed by GAAP non-tax accounting rules.

His 1982 paper "Tax Shelter Gain: The Mismatch of Debt and Supply Side Depreciation" explained that the law cannot both allow expensing of equipment and an interest deduction without creating wasteful tax shelter subsidies.

The "Financial Impact of the 1986 Tax Reform Act on Real Estate: A View from the Spreadsheets" showed that the Tax Reform Act of 1986 reduced the value of depreciable real estate by roughly half.

Later Johnson wrote "A Thermometer for the Tax System: The Overall Health of the Tax System as Measured by Implicit Tax", which showed that the reduction in interest rate generated by the tax exemption on municipal bonds is modest, which demonstrates how ineffective as an incentive device and loophole-ridden America's income tax system is.

In "Was it Lost? Personal Deductions under Tax Reform", he contended that personal deductions are legitimate if they represent the loss of standard of living, but not if they are for the purchase of benefits the taxpayer achieves in return.

"Contributions to Capital from Nonowners," a 2010 article, argued that contributions from nonowners increase the net worth of the corporation and its shareholders and are properly taxed. The article lead Congress to contract the exemption from tax for contributions from nonowners.

In 2011, the Onion published a satirical piece running off his argument that computer games like Doom were the most heavily subsidized industry in America.

The 2011 work, "Corporate Meltdowns Caused by Compensatory Stock Options", showed that high officer stock options give an unbudgeted, uncontrolled subsidy for the officers to go into high-risk investments that have a negative expected value, but which enrich the option holders and endanger the corporation.

His article "Measure Tax Expenditures by Internal Rate of Return", concluded that given the general interest deduction, tax expenditures or tax subsidies need to be measured from a base of reducing internal rate of return by the statutory tax rate. This is the measure both for Samuelson depreciation and in the effective tax rate measure used in the Tax Reform Act of 1986.

"No orchard, no capital gain" argued that, under the original principled conceptual roots of "capital gain," a taxpayer needs to possess a property with the basis for the gain to qualify as capital gain.

Focusing on the necessity to align the adjusted basis with the value set by the smart public market, the paper titled "Fair income tax on the trillion-dollar behemoths" argues for the need to capitalize the costs of intangible investments.

In 2022, Johnson wrote the article "Interest ceiling must be adjusted basis times interest rate", which argued that to avoid negative tax, better than mere tax exemption, a ceiling on interest deductions equal to taxpayers' adjusted basis in property creditors can reach times the interest rate is required. In this structure, he wrote, there would be an exception allowed for loan balances reduced by year-end.

"Determine Dividends by Shareholder Gains, Not Corporate E&P," argues that the current law of dividends, depending on corporate earnings and profits, is dysfunctional and that shareholders need to be allowed recovery of basis not by looking at a corporate account, but only when they have lost basis looking to their own situation.

Johnson's 2022 piece, "Cut off the Equity Funds," published in Tax Notes Federal, emphasized the need to cut off the extraordinary tax-driven subsidy the Private Equity Funds get on their leveraged buyouts, replacing equity with interest-deductible, high-risk debt. He explained the need to expand section 279 of the Code to take away the interest deduction on debt incurred to buy back the issuer's own stock.

=== Shelf project ===
Johnson led the 'Shelf Project', published by Tax Notes, which created ideas, in the nature of war plans, to enhance the tax base when Congress is ready. The Shelf Project has published 84 ideas and work on the project continues.

=== Constitutional law ===
Johnson has also worked in the area of constitutional law. His book, Righteous Anger at the Wicked States: The Meaning of the Founders' Constitution presents an intellectual history of the arguments leading to the adoption of the Constitution. In this book, he argued that the Constitution was written and ratified to create a strong national government with the power to tax to maintain payments to the Dutch on the Revolutionary War debts.

Johnson has consistently argued for the complete overturning of Pollock v. Farmers' Trust in 1894, where apportionment of direct tax among the states was erroneously used as a killing requirement. In the original meaning, the apportionment of tax by population was intended to measure wealth by the contribution to wealth of the labor of its people and to achieve a uniform tax rate on states' wealth. However, when apportionment failed to achieve uniform rates, the Founders strategically clarified the meaning of 'direct tax' to avoid the application of apportionment.

In "Impost Begat Convention: Albany and New York Confront the Ratification of the Constitution" he argued that the New York debates over ratification of the Constitution were primarily over whether New York State or the National government would get the revenue from the impost on the New York harbor import. He has reviewed books on Constitutional history.

His "Sola Scriptura: Slavery, Federalism and the Textual Power to Provide for the General Welfare" argued that the Constitution's text grants Congress the authority to use taxation and other necessary and proper means to ensure the common defense and general welfare.

== Bibliography ==
=== Books ===
- Righteous Anger at the Wicked States: The Meaning of the Founders' Constitution (2005) ISBN 9780521757522

=== Selected articles ===
- Johnson, C. H. (1982). Tax Shelter Gain: The Mismatch of Debt and Supply Side Depreciation. Tex. L. Rev., 61, 1013.
- Johnson, C. H. (1998). Apportionment of direct taxes: The foul-up in the core of the Constitution. Wm. & Mary Bill Rts. J., 7, 1.
