= Kennebec Savings Bank =

American community bank

- Type: Private company
- Industry: Financial services
- Founded: 1870 (156 years ago)
- Headquarters: Augusta, Maine, United States
- Area served: Maine
- Key people: Andrew Silsby (President and CEO)
- Products: Banking services
- Number of employees: 200 (2022)
- Website: www.kennebecsavings.bank

Kennebec Savings Bank is an American community bank that is headquartered in Augusta, Maine. As of 2020, it had more than $1 billion in assets. Forbes has voted Kennebec Savings Bank "Maine’s Best Bank", topping its list of "Best In-State Banks and Credit Unions".

The bank is led by Andrew Silsby, who is president and CEO.
