= Jabez Weston House =

Historic house in Massachusetts, United States

- U.S. National Register of Historic Places
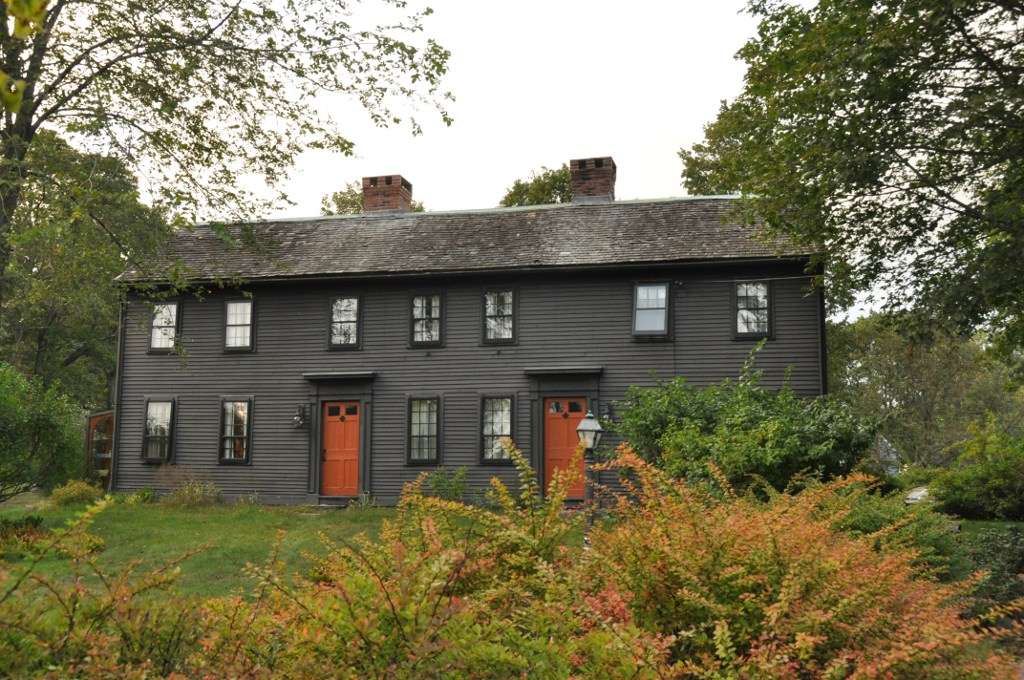

- Location within Massachusetts Location within the United States
- Location: 86 West Street, Reading, Massachusetts
- Coordinates: 42°30′43″N 71°7′22″W
- Built: 1779
- Architectural style: Georgian
- MPS: Reading MRA
- NRHP reference No.: 84002846
- Added to NRHP: July 19, 1984

The Jabez Weston House is a historic house in Reading, Massachusetts. The older portion of this 2 1/2-story timber-frame house was built c. 1779 in a late-Georgian early-Federalist style. This portion consisted of a five bay section with a centrally located front door. Sometime (probably still in the 18th century), an eastern extension added three bays and a second entrance, converting the building into a two family residence. The property belonged to the Weston family, who were early settlers of the area.

The house was listed on the National Register of Historic Places in 1984.

== See also ==
- National Register of Historic Places listings in Reading, Massachusetts
- National Register of Historic Places listings in Middlesex County, Massachusetts
