= Ephraim Weston House =

Historic house in Massachusetts, United States

- Ephrain Weston House
- U.S. National Register of Historic Places
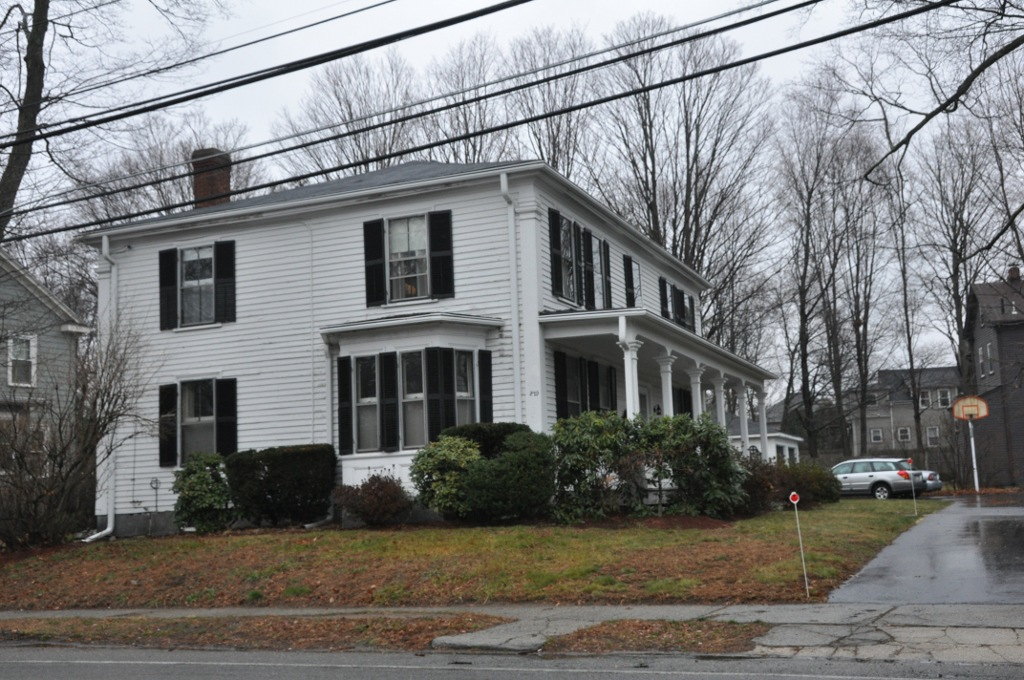

- Location within Massachusetts Location within the United States
- Location: 229 West Street, Reading, Massachusetts
- Coordinates: 42°31′5.75″N 71°7′12.23″W
- Built: 1800
- Architectural style: Federal
- MPS: Reading MRA
- NRHP reference No.: 84002845
- Added to NRHP: July 19, 1984

The Ephraim Weston House is a historic house in Reading, Massachusetts. It is incorrectly listed on the National Register of Historic Places as the Ephrain Weston House, at 224 West Street. It was built in the early years of the 19th century by Ephraim Weston, a local real estate developer and businessman; he operated a local general store and a shoe manufacturing business, one of the early such businesses in the town. It is a two-story wood-frame structure, with a hip roof and two chimneys. The main facade faces south (not to the street, which lies to the west), and has a single-story porch extending across its width, supported by square posts. The building corners are pilastered, and a single-story bay projects from the west side. The house is locally distinctive as a rare Federal period house with a hip roof and later applied Italianate styling.

== See also ==
- National Register of Historic Places listings in Reading, Massachusetts
- National Register of Historic Places listings in Middlesex County, Massachusetts
