= Fuller-Weston House =

Historic house in Maine, United States

- U.S. National Register of Historic Places
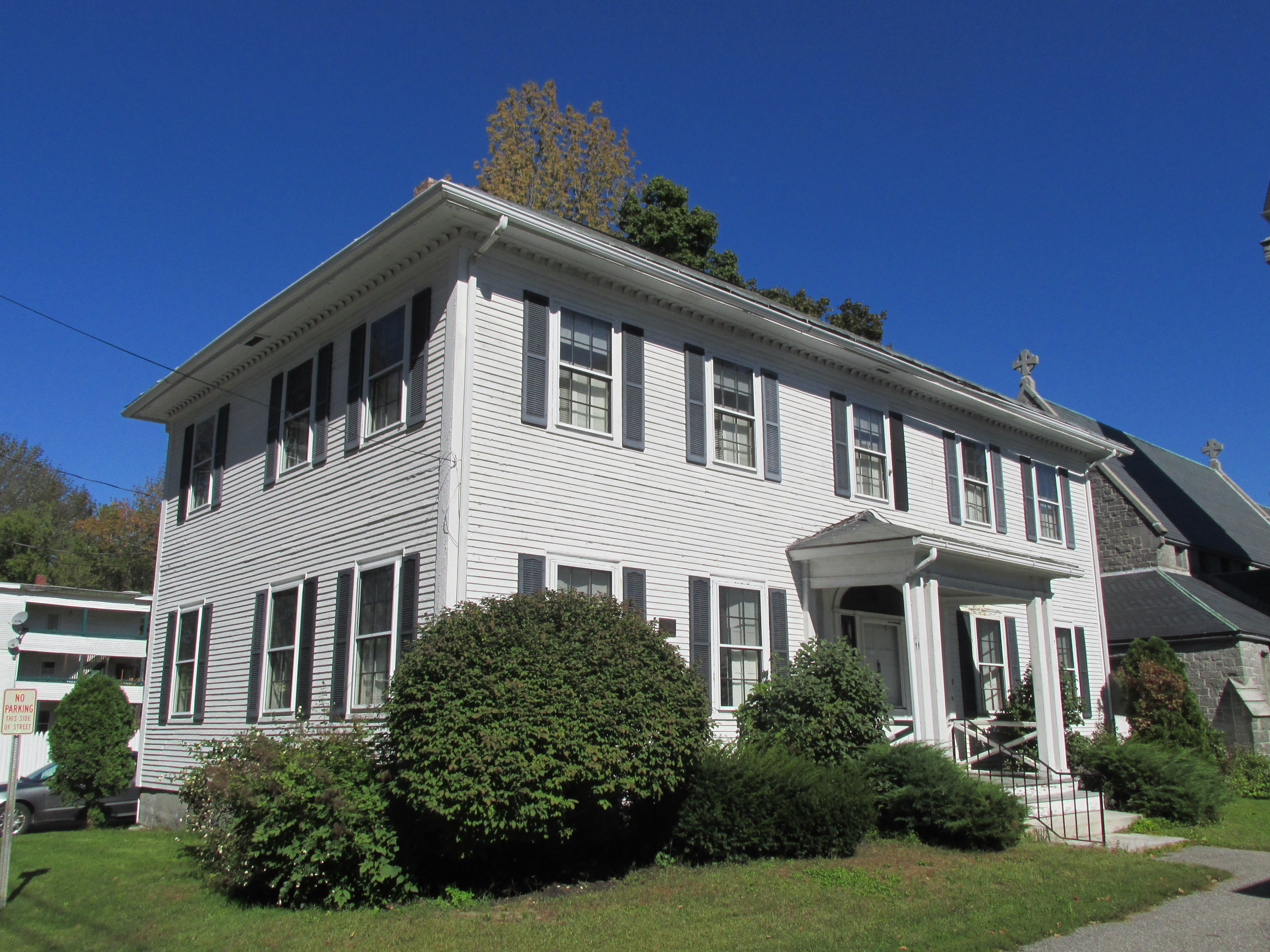

- Location within Maine Location within the United States
- Location: 11 Summer St., Augusta, Maine
- Coordinates: 44°18′59″N 69°46′45″W
- Area: 0.3 acres (0.12 ha)
- Built: 1818
- NRHP reference No.: 84001374
- Added to NRHP: March 22, 1984

The Fuller-Weston House is a historic house at 11 Summer Street in Augusta, Maine. Built in 1818, it is a fine local example of Federal period architecture, and is further notable for several of its occupants, who include the Chief Justice of the United States Melville Fuller. The house was listed on the National Register of Historic Places in 1984. It now serves as the rectory of St. Mark's Church.

== Description and history ==
The Fuller-Weston House stands on the east side of Summer Street, a largely residential street north of the city's downtown. It is oriented facing south. It is a two-story wood-frame structure, with a hip roof, clapboard siding, and granite foundation. It has a five-bay main facade, with a center entrance flanked by sidelight windows and pilasters, and topped by a Federal style louvered fan. It is sheltered by a flat-roof portico supported by square posts.

The house was built in 1818 for Henry Weld Fuller, a lawyer who purchased 100 acres (40 ha) of land, including much of central Augusta. Fuller sold the house in 1827 to Nathan Weston, who had just been appointed to the Maine Supreme Judicial Court, and became its chief justice in 1834. Weston's daughter married Fuller's son, and they gave birth to Melville Fuller, who served as the Chief Justice of the United States Supreme Court from 1888 to 1910.

== See also ==
- National Register of Historic Places listings in Kennebec County, Maine
