= Kennebec County Courthouse =

- U.S. National Register of Historic Places
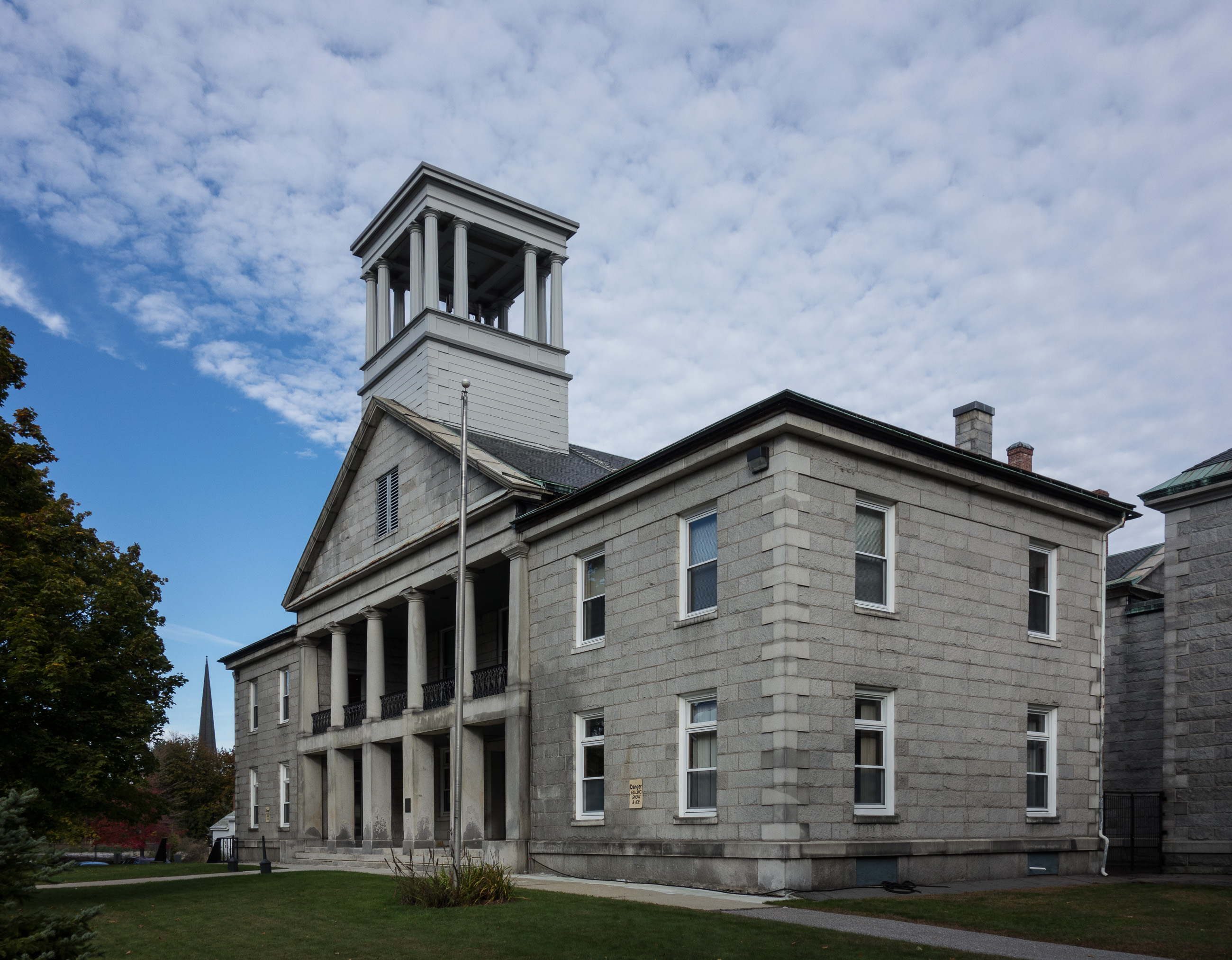

- Location within Maine Location within the United States
- Location: 95 State St., Augusta, Maine
- Coordinates: 44°18′53″N 69°46′39″W
- Area: 1 acre (0.40 ha)
- Built: 1829
- Built by: Vose, Robert C.
- Architect: Cochran, James
- Architectural style: Greek Revival
- NRHP reference No.: 74000169
- Added to NRHP: July 25, 1974

The Kennebec County Courthouse is located at 95 State Street in Augusta, Maine, the state capital and county seat of Kennebec County. Built in 1829 and twice enlarged, it is one of the oldest examples of Greek Revival architecture in the state, and its earliest known example of a Greek temple front. The building, which is now mostly taken up by county offices, was listed on the National Register of Historic Places in 1974.

== Description and history ==
The Kennebec County Courthouse stands just west of Augusta's commercial downtown, on the east side of State Street between Winthrop and Court Streets. A modern courthouse, which houses most of the county's judicial functions today, stands just to the east across Perham Street, and the Kennebec County Jail is just to the south. It is a two-story masonry structure, built mainly out of roughly finished cut granite, with finely finished granite trim. The main block is roughly rectangular, with a central gabled section flanked by hip-roofed wings. The gable front is fully pedimented, supported by six granite Doric columns and topped by a wood-frame open belfry, its corners supported by groups of Doric columns. The building corners are quoined with lighter granite blocks, and iron railings run between the columns of the portico on the second level.

The courthouse was built in 1829 to a design by James Cochran, who also oversaw its construction. It was enlarged to the rear in 1851, and again in 1907; both additions are of granite in sympathetic styling. The building is one of the state's best examples of early Greek Revival architecture, and is the first documented appearance of a temple front.

== See also ==
- National Register of Historic Places listings in Kennebec County, Maine
