= National Register of Historic Places listings in Waldo County, Maine =

Location of Waldo County in Maine

Waldo County, Maine, United States, has 68 properties and districts listed on the National Register of Historic Places, including one National Historic Landmark. Another property was once listed but has been removed.

Latitude and longitude coordinates are provided for many National Register properties and districts; these locations may be seen together in a map.

This National Park Service list is complete through NPS recent listings posted September 25, 2026.

Contents: Counties and municipalities in Maine
Androscoggin - Aroostook - Cumberland (City of Portland) - Franklin - Hancock - Kennebec - Knox - Lincoln - Oxford - Penobscot - Piscataquis - Sagadahoc - Somerset - Waldo - Washington - York

== Current listings ==
	Name on the Register	Image	Date listed	Location	City or town	Description
1	Archeological Site No. 29-64		February 22, 1982 (#82000782)	Address Restricted	Islesboro	
2	Archeological Site No. 39.1		August 1, 1994 (#94000759)	Address Restricted	Searsmont	
3	Bayside Historic District	Bayside Historic District	December 30, 1996 (#96001477)	Roughly bounded by Penobscot Bay, Clinton Ave., George St., and Bay View Park; 44°22′48″N 68°58′09″W	Bayside	
4	Belfast Commercial Historic District	Belfast Commercial Historic District	April 4, 1980 (#80000257)	Main St. between Church and Cross Sts. 44°25′34″N 69°00′27″W	Belfast	
5	Belfast Historic District	Belfast Historic District	August 21, 1986 (#86002733)	Roughly bounded by High, Grove, Elm, Congress, Main, Market, and Imrose; also 59-63 Anderson St; also 121 High St. 44°25′25″N 69°00′23″W	Belfast	Anderson St. addresses and High St. address each represent boundary increases April 02, 1993, and December 28, 1995
6	Belfast National Bank	Belfast National Bank	April 23, 1973 (#73000148)	Main and Beaver Sts. 44°25′32″N 69°00′26″W	Belfast	
7	Black Horse Tavern	Black Horse Tavern	February 11, 1982 (#82000783)	Searsport Ave. 44°25′44″N 68°59′02″W	Belfast	
8	Camp NEOFA		March 22, 2024 (#100010083)	213 Trotting Park Road; 44°23′07″N 69°16′14″W	Montville	
9	Carver Memorial Library	Carver Memorial Library	October 14, 1993 (#93001113)	Northeastern corner of the junction of Union and Mortland Sts. 44°27′38″N 68°55′23″W	Searsport	
10	Hezekiah Chase House	Hezekiah Chase House	January 31, 1978 (#78000202)	U.S. Route 202; 44°36′49″N 69°19′58″W	Unity	
11	Christ Church	Christ Church	March 26, 1992 (#92000276)	Off the western side of Main Rd. south of Dark Harbor; 44°15′26″N 68°54′45″W	Dark Harbor	
12	Church Street Historic District	Church Street Historic District	November 28, 1978 (#78000331)	Irregular pattern along Church St. from High to Franklin Sts. 44°25′23″N 69°00′14″W	Belfast	
13	Cobe Estate	Cobe Estate	October 20, 1983 (#83003684)	North of Northport on Bluff Rd. 44°22′27″N 68°58′07″W	Northport	
14	College Club Inn	College Club Inn	April 14, 2000 (#00000377)	190 W. Main St. 44°26′40″N 68°56′07″W	Searsport	
15	Dark Harbor Shop		September 28, 2017 (#100001677)	515 Pendleton Point Rd. 44°15′41″N 68°54′49″W	Islesboro	
16	Drexel Estate		March 21, 1985 (#85000613)	The Bluff; 44°20′37″N 68°52′50″W	Islesboro	
17	East Main Street Historic District	East Main Street Historic District	December 13, 1991 (#91001815)	U.S. Route 1 between Black Rd. and Navy St. 44°27′27″N 68°54′53″W	Searsport	
18	Farwell Brothers Store	Farwell Brothers Store	December 30, 2019 (#100004828)	37 Gordon Hill Rd. 44°34′43″N 69°16′33″W	Thorndike	
19	First Church of Belfast	First Church of Belfast	November 7, 1976 (#76000115)	Church St. 44°25′28″N 69°00′27″W	Belfast	
20	Fort Knox State Park	Fort Knox State Park	October 1, 1969 (#69000023)	U.S. Route 1 near Prospect; 44°33′53″N 68°48′34″W	Prospect	
21	Fort Point Light Station	Fort Point Light Station	March 23, 1988 (#87002269)	Fort Point Rd. 44°28′01″N 68°48′45″W	Stockton Springs	
22	Fort Pownall Memorial	Fort Pownall Memorial	October 28, 1969 (#69000028)	Southeast of Stockton Springs on Fort Point; 44°28′05″N 68°48′46″W	Stockton Springs	
23	Frankfort Dam	Frankfort Dam	February 12, 2003 (#03000018)	South of the junction of U.S. Route 1A and the north branch of Marsh Stream; 44°36′33″N 68°52′24″W	Frankfort	
24	Free Will Baptist Church and Cemetery		September 27, 1988 (#88000891)	Church Rd. 44°21′11″N 68°53′41″W	North Islesboro	
25	Georges River Canal		March 5, 1970 (#70000048)	Upper Falls on the Georges River in Warren to the Union town line, extending to Quantabacook Pond in Searsmont; 44°15′N 69°15′W	Searsmont	Also extends into Knox County
26	Greer's Corner School		October 16, 1991 (#91001513)	Southeastern corner of Back Belmont and Lincolnville Rd. 44°22′28″N 69°07′48″W	Belmont Corner	
27	Grindle Point Light Station	Grindle Point Light Station	March 13, 1987 (#87000427)	Ferry Rd. 44°16′53″N 68°56′36″W	Islesboro	
28	Hardscrabble Farm		March 17, 1994 (#94000181)	Eastern side of Maine State Route 131, 0.5 miles (0.80 km) south of its junction with State Route 173; 44°21′13″N 69°11′56″W	Searsmont	
29	Hayford Block	Hayford Block	August 29, 1977 (#77000087)	47 Church St. 44°25′31″N 69°00′27″W	Belfast	
30	Nathan G. Hichborn House	Nathan G. Hichborn House	April 7, 1988 (#88000392)	Church St. 44°29′25″N 68°51′29″W	Stockton Springs	
31	Islesboro Free Library		January 5, 1989 (#88003018)	Main Rd. 44°18′09″N 68°54′04″W	Islesboro	
32	Keen Hall	Keen Hall	June 26, 2017 (#100001242)	1 Main St. 44°31′43″N 69°17′48″W	Freedom	
33	Ebenezer Knowlton House		January 11, 2002 (#01001433)	Choate Rd. 44°22′44″N 69°16′03″W	Montville	
34	Lincolnville Center Meeting House	Lincolnville Center Meeting House	July 21, 1983 (#83000475)	State Route 173; 44°17′55″N 69°06′33″W	Lincolnville Center	
35	(Former) Maine Central Railroad Depot		August 5, 2009 (#09000595)	31 State Route 7; 44°33′05″N 69°07′17″W	Brooks	
36	Marsh School		April 23, 2013 (#13000188)	930 Bangor Rd. 44°33′04″N 68°51′53″W	Prospect	
37	Masonic Temple	Masonic Temple	April 26, 1973 (#73000246)	High St. (U.S. Route 1); 44°25′34″N 69°00′24″W	Belfast	
38	Capt. John McGilvery House	Capt. John McGilvery House	December 29, 1983 (#83003685)	E. Main St. 44°27′31″N 68°55′00″W	Searsport	
39	Capt. William McGilvery House	Capt. William McGilvery House	December 29, 1983 (#83003686)	E. Main St. 44°27′33″N 68°54′52″W	Searsport	
40	Mill at Freedom Falls	Mill at Freedom Falls	April 19, 2012 (#12000228)	South side of Mill St., 125 feet (38 m) west of Pleasant St. 44°31′41″N 69°17′49″W	Freedom	
41	Moody Farm		October 31, 2002 (#02001269)	Junction of State Route 173 and Lawry Rd. 44°21′33″N 69°08′56″W	Searsmont	
42	Montville Town House		April 24, 2012 (#12000227)	418 Center Rd. 44°26′47″N 69°14′46″W	Montville	
43	Mortland Family Farm		October 24, 1991 (#91001510)	Eastern side of Mortland Rd. north of Searsport; 44°28′38″N 68°55′21″W	Searsport	
44	Mount Waldo Granite Works	Mount Waldo Granite Works	March 15, 1974 (#74000194)	on the slopes of Mount Waldo; 44°35′26″N 68°53′01″W	Frankfort	
45	Capt. John P. Nichols House	Capt. John P. Nichols House	January 4, 1983 (#83000476)	U.S. Route 1; 44°27′28″N 68°54′56″W	Searsport	
46	Old Post Office		June 19, 1973 (#73000149)	Main St. (State Route 173); 44°23′31″N 69°18′26″W	Liberty	
47	James G. Pendleton House	James G. Pendleton House	March 10, 1995 (#95000218)	81 W. Main St. 44°27′10″N 68°55′59″W	Searsport	
48	Penobscot Marine Museum	Penobscot Marine Museum	July 1, 1970 (#70000088)	Church St. 44°27′36″N 68°55′31″W	Searsport	
49	Philler Cottage		April 11, 1985 (#85000726)	Main Rd., Dark Harbor; 44°15′31″N 68°54′45″W	Islesboro	
50	Pilley House		September 15, 2022 (#100008124)	11 Moosehead Trail; 44°33′17″N 69°07′23″W	Brooks	
51	Primrose Hill Historic District		October 3, 1973 (#73000150)	High and Anderson Sts. 44°25′16″N 69°00′44″W	Belfast	
52	Privateer Brigantine DEFENCE Shipwreck Site		March 18, 1975 (#75000205)	Buried in Stockton Springs Harbor	Stockton Springs	Ship wrecked during the 1779 Penobscot Expedition.
53	Searsport Historic District	Searsport Historic District	July 27, 1979 (#79000168)	Main St. 44°27′30″N 68°55′33″W	Searsport	
54	Seven Star Grange, No. 73		November 18, 2011 (#11000817)	696 Bangor Rd. 44°39′46″N 69°15′26″W	Troy	
55	Springdale Farm	Springdale Farm	April 24, 2000 (#00000374)	Horseback Rd., 0.5 miles (0.80 km) south of Troy Rd. 44°40′59″N 69°21′57″W	Burnham	
56	Stockton Springs Community Church	Stockton Springs Community Church	June 20, 1985 (#85001266)	20 Church St. 44°29′28″N 68°51′29″W	Stockton Springs	
57	George S. Tiffany Cottage		October 16, 1989 (#89001700)	Off Main Rd. 44°14′57″N 68°55′22″W	Dark Harbor	
58	Tranquility Grange No. 344		April 11, 2002 (#02000350)	1 mile (1.6 km) north of the junction of State Routes 52 and 173; 44°18′21″N 69°05′52″W	Lincolnville Center	
59	Troy Meeting House	Troy Meeting House	November 18, 2011 (#11000818)	514 Bangor Rd. 44°39′54″N 69°14′23″W	Troy	
60	George Ulmer House		October 4, 2006 (#06000922)	3 S. Cobbtown Rd. 44°17′55″N 69°00′14″W	Lincolnville	
61	Union Hall	Union Hall	March 20, 1986 (#86000478)	3 Reservoir St. 44°27′34″N 68°55′28″W	Searsport	
62	Union School		March 25, 1993 (#93000203)	Eastern side of Mt. Ephraim Rd., 0.2 miles (0.32 km) north of its junction with U.S. Route 1; 44°27′38″N 68°55′43″W	Searsport	
63	Village School	Village School	June 27, 2014 (#14000363)	69 School Street; 44°36′45″N 69°20′15″W	Unity	
64	Paul and Lucena Webster Summer House		December 26, 2023 (#100009660)	142 Lighthouse Road; 44°27′58″N 68°49′06″W	Stockton Springs	
65	James P. White House	James P. White House	April 24, 1973 (#73000245)	1 Church St. 44°25′15″N 69°00′02″W	Belfast	
66	Whitney Farm	Whitney Farm	March 17, 2015 (#15000087)	215 Whitney Rd. 44°19′44″N 69°13′50″W	Appleton	Extends into Searsmont; farmstead is in Appleton.
67	Winterport Congregational Church		April 24, 1973 (#73000151)	Alternate U.S. Route 1; 44°38′09″N 68°50′49″W	Winterport	
68	Winterport Historic District	Winterport Historic District	October 3, 1975 (#75000112)	Irregular pattern along Main, Elm, Cushing, Lebanon, Commercial, Dean, and Water Sts. 44°38′10″N 68°50′53″W	Winterport	

== Former listing ==
	Name on the Register	Image	Date listed	Date removed	Location	City or town	Description
1	Waldo-Hancock Bridge	Waldo-Hancock Bridge	June 20, 1985 (#85001267)	December 18, 2013	U.S. Route 1; 44°33′37″N 68°48′08″W	Prospect	Demolished in 2013. Extended into Hancock County

== See also ==
- List of National Historic Landmarks in Maine
- National Register of Historic Places listings in Maine
