= Frankfort Dam =

- U.S. National Register of Historic Places
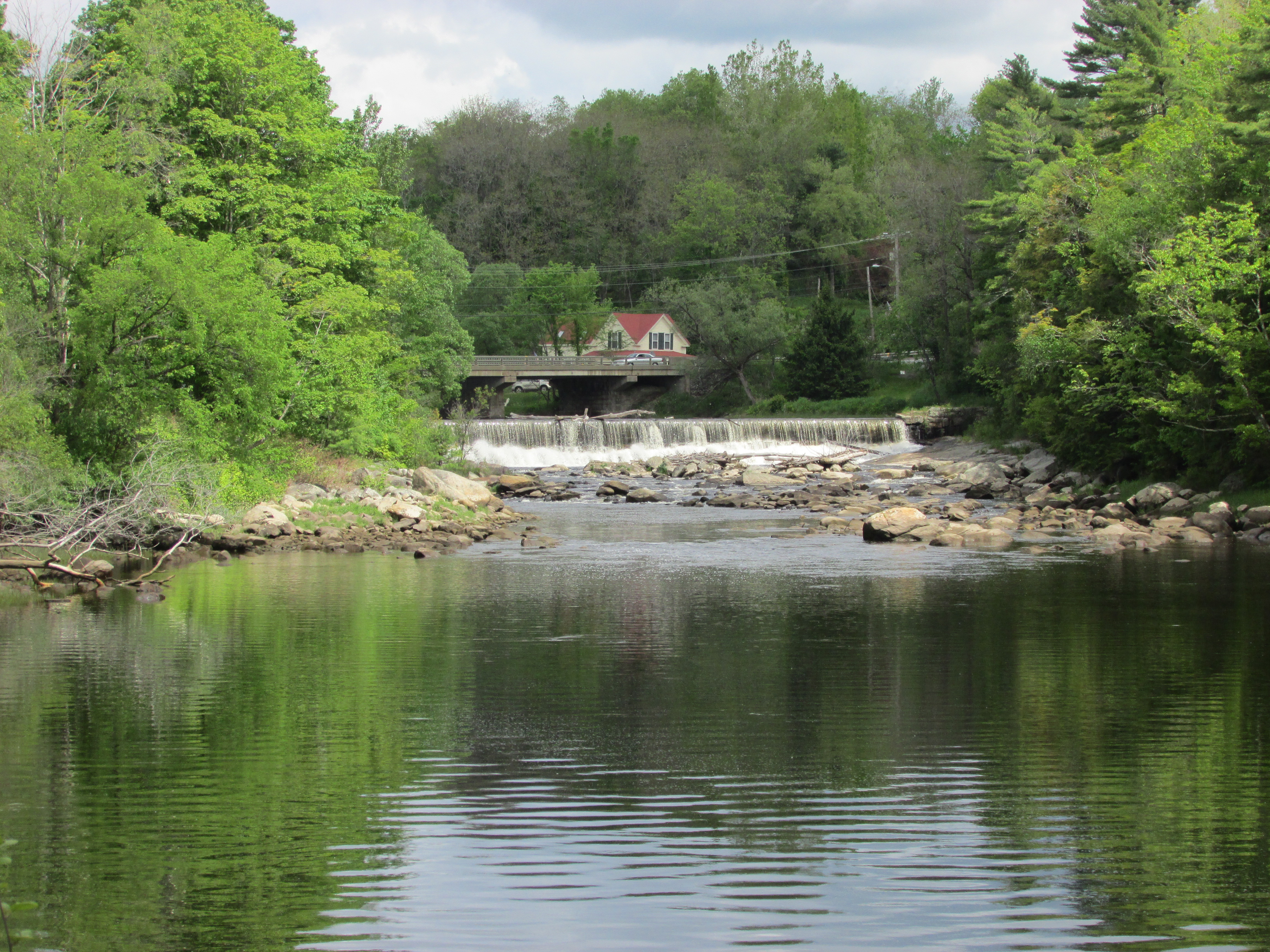

- Location within Maine Location within the United States
- Location: S of jct. of US 1A and Marsh Stream, Frankfort, Maine
- Coordinates: 44°36′33″N 68°52′24″W
- Area: less than one acre
- Built: 1905
- NRHP reference No.: 03000018
- Added to NRHP: February 12, 2003

The Frankfort Dam impounds Marsh Stream near the center of Frankfort, Maine, United States. Built in 1905 out of granite probably quarried at the nearby Mount Waldo Granite Works to provide power to local mills, it served for many years as a key element of the local economy. Its spillway has been adapted for use by a hydroelectric power station. The dam was listed on the National Register of Historic Places in 2003.

== Description and history ==
The Frankfort Dam is located on Marsh Stream, just downstream from United States Route 1A in the center of Frankfort, Maine. It is built out of dry-laid cut granite blocks, and is about 250 feet (76 m) long. The dam has a stepped height, with platforms at the ends 14 feet (4.3 m) in height, and a long central section 9 feet (2.7 m) high. It is about 5 feet (1.5 m) wide at the top, with a flat and nearly vertical upstream side, and a downstream side that is stepped, getting thicker toward the base. A sluiceway was originally located on the west side of the dam, which was fed by a control gate in the western platform. This feature has largely been altered to provide for a fish ladder and small hydroelectric power generation plant.

The dam was built in 1905, and was at least the third on the location, which had been used since the late 18th century as a power source for grist and lumber mills. It was built by the Mount Waldo Granite Works, and is presumed to have been built out of their granite, although no documentation has been found to confirm this. The dam's water power was used by a variety of businesses until the 1970s. The fish ladder was built in 1982, and the power plant in 1985. The dam is now owned by the town of Frankfort.

== See also ==
- National Register of Historic Places listings in Waldo County, Maine
