= Montville Town House =

Historic church in Maine, United States

- U.S. National Register of Historic Places
- Location within Maine Location within the United States
- Location: 418 Center Rd., Montville, Maine
- Coordinates: 44°26′47″N 69°14′46″W
- Area: Less than one acre
- Built: 1827
- NRHP reference No.: 12000227
- Added to NRHP: April 24, 2012

The Montville Town House is the town hall of Montville, Maine. It is located at 418 Center Road, in an 1827 former church building. It has served as a center of town government since 1828, and was listed on the National Register of Historic Places in 2012, in part as a rare example of a "reverse plan" church, where the pulpit is located near the entrance.

== Description and history ==
The Montville Town House is located at a crossroads known as "Center Montville" in eastern Montville, where Center Street is met by North Ridge Road and Morrill Road. It is a single story wood frame structure, with a gabled roof, clapboard siding and granite foundation. The main facade faces roughly south, and has a projecting gabled section across its center, with flanking sash windows on either side. The projecting section has twin entry doors. Trim is simple and vernacular in style. The interior is divided into a vestibule area, a meetingroom for the town selectman, and a large hall now fitted with theater-style seating. Walls are finished with painted wainscoting and plaster above, and the ceiling is finished in pressed tin.

The town house was built in 1827 to house the Free Will Baptist congregation, and was known as the North Ridge Meeting House. From 1828 the building was also used by the town for town meetings and other civic purposes. Its main hall originally housed box pews, which were removed at an unknown date, and there is significant evidence that the pulpit (also long since removed) was located in the south wall (nearest the entrance) of the hall, an unusual configuration seen in only a dozen or so churches in Maine. Ownership of the building is uncertain prior to 1895, by which time the congregation had faded away and it was clearly under municipal control. In 1909-10 the town made a number alterations, including the construction of the selectmen's meeting room and the addition of the tin ceiling. The theater seating was installed in the 1950s, replacing bench pews.

== See also ==
- National Register of Historic Places listings in Waldo County, Maine
