= Whitney Farm =

- U.S. National Register of Historic Places
- U.S. Historic district
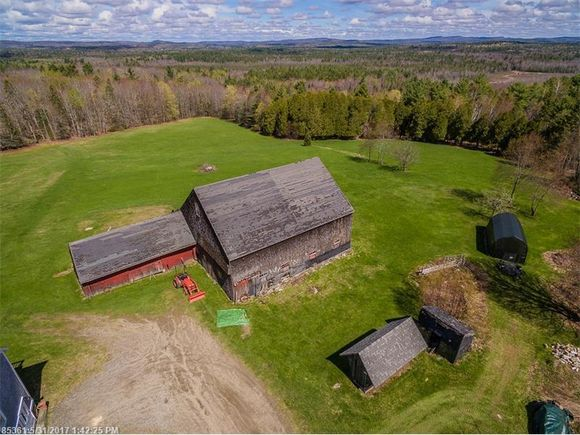

- Location within Maine Location within the United States
- Location: 215 Whitney Rd., Appleton and Searsmont, Maine
- Coordinates: 44°19′54″N 69°13′51″W
- Area: 206 acres (83 ha)
- Built: 1825
- NRHP reference No.: 15000087
- Added to NRHP: March 17, 2015

The Whitney Farm is a historic farm property at 215 Whitneyville Road in Appleton, Maine. Encompassing more than 200 acres (81 ha) of land in Appleton and Searsmont, the farm exemplifies the evolutionary history of farm properties in the Mid Coast region, with a variety of outbuildings reflective of changing trends in agriculture, and a c. 1825 farmstead that was not fitted for electricity or indoor plumbing until 2008. The property was listed on the National Register of Historic Places in 2015.

== Description and history ==
The Whitney Farm property is located in eastern Appleton and western Searsmont, a rural inland area of Mid Coast Maine. The farmstead is located in Appleton, about 0.5 miles (0.80 km) downslope on the north side of Appleton Ridge. The farm property consists of a series of fields and woodlots, and is partly divided by Whitney Bog, which straddles the town line. The farmstead is a closely grouped collection of buildings at the northeastern end of Whitneyville Road, the access road to the property from Appleton Ridge Road. The main house is a c. 1825 Cape style wood-frame building, with its exterior clad in a combination of clapboards and wooden shingles. Brick chimneys rise at the center of the main block, and in one of two single-story gabled ells that project from it. North of the house stands the barn, dating to the first half of the 19th century, from which a single-story series of garage bays once projected southward. A second outbuilding was called the cooper shop by members of the Whitney family; it has two sections, one dating to c. 1900, and the other of older but uncertain age. This building also saw historical use as a chicken coop. Also to the east of the house is a long and rectangular poultry house. Two distinctive surviving outbuildings are a corn crib and ice house, both relatively unusual survivors in rural Maine.

This farm property was first settled about 1825 by John Tole, and was basically a subsistence farm in its early years. It remained as a diversified farm, growing in size with the success of several owners in the second half of the 19th century, and was purchased in 1878 by Martha and Hezekiah Whitney, whose descendants would own the property into the 21st century. Burton Whitney, of the second generation, was predominantly a cooper, producing barrels for potato farming businesses of Aroostook County, but specialized the farm into poultry.

== Film and Publications ==
The Whitney Farm was featured in the film Thinner from the Stephen King novel of the same name. The movie showcases a scene or scenes which include the grounds, the house and the barn.

== Renovation and Evolution ==
The original house as mentioned earlier would have been built in the 1820s. The first addition to the home would have been in the early 1900s. This addition was a new kitchen. After the Whitney family ownership passed to new ownership, the home was renovated extensively. In about 2008, electricity and plumbing were added to the house. The previously attached outhouse and woodshed was removed and replaced with a master suite of timber framed construction.

The barn remained largely unchanged until 2025 when the roof was replaced and new flooring installed.

== See also ==
- National Register of Historic Places listings in Knox County, Maine
- National Register of Historic Places listings in Waldo County, Maine
