= Hardscrabble Farm =

- U.S. National Register of Historic Places
- U.S. Historic district
- Location within Maine Location within the United States
- Nearest city: Searsmont, Maine
- Coordinates: 44°21′13″N 69°11′56″W
- Area: 70 acres (28 ha)
- Built: 1900
- NRHP reference No.: 94000181
- Added to NRHP: March 17, 1994

Hardscrabble Farm is a historic farm property in rural Searsmont, Maine, United States. Located south of its village center at 122 Maine State Route 131, the 70-acre (28 ha) property features a typical New England connected farmstead with an 1840s Greek Revival farmhouse. The property is notable as the leisure time summer residence of author Ben Ames Williams, who fictionalized Searsmont as the town of "Fraternity" in his works. The property was listed on the National Register of Historic Places in 1994.

== Description and history ==
Hardscrabble Farm is located south of the village center of Searsmont, on the east side of Maine SR 131 near its junction with Appleton Ridge Road. The main farm complex has as its main house a 1 1/2-story wood-frame structure, oriented facing west toward the road, with a side-gable roof and central chimney. The main façade is symmetrical, with a recessed center entrance flanked by sidelight windows and wide pilasters, with an entablature above. A series of ells, telescoping in size, join the house to a 19th-century barn. Although the interior has had some modernization done in the 20th century, it has retained some Greek Revival features, including fireplace mantels, and the staircase to the upper level, which, in an unusual configuration, extends as a single run from the entry vestibule between two fireplace flues.

The farmhouse is estimated to have been either built or extensively modified in the 1840s. A house was standing on the property when it was purchased by David Lincoln in 1841, but it is not known if this house is a restyling of an earlier 19th-century house, or a new construction. In 1852 the property came into the Weed family, whose descendants would own it until the death of Bert McCorisson in 1931. During that period, the farm became known as "Hardscrabble Farm", honoring the same-named property of American Civil War General and United States President Ulysses S. Grant. Bert McCorisson was a close friend of author Ben Ames Williams, and willed the property to his friend upon his death. Williams made the property his summer home until his own death in 1953. Williams was known for his prodigious short story output and a number of novels. Some of his writing was set in the fictional rural Maine community of "Fraternity", based loosely on Searsmont. Bert McCorrison appeared in some of his works as "Bert McAusland".

== See also ==
- National Register of Historic Places listings in Waldo County, Maine
