= Archeological Site No. 39.1 =

- U.S. National Register of Historic Places
- Nearest city: Searsmont, Maine
- Area: 4.5 acres (1.8 ha)
- MPS: Maine Fluted Point Paleoindian Sites MPS
- NRHP reference No.: 94000759
- Added to NRHP: August 1, 1994

Archeological Site No. 39.1 is a prehistoric archaeological site in Searsmont, Maine. Located on the floodplain of a waterway, it is one of the state's largest Paleo-Indian habitation sites, estimated by the surveying archaeologists to be about 18,000 square metres (4.4 acres). The unstratified (single-layer) site is expected to contribute significantly to what is known about prehistoric human habitation patterns in the area, and was listed on the National Register of Historic Places in 1994 for this reason.

== Description ==
Site 39.1 is located in Searsmont, a rural inland community of southern Waldo County, Maine. Its setting is in a floodplain of one of the local waterways, in a hay meadow that had not seen active agricultural use for many years. The site was identified in 1993 during a field survey pursuant to the routing of a communications cable, and was subjected to test excavation that year, and more extensive field work in 1994.

The site was determined by the investigating archaeologists to encompass a roughly rectangular area 200 by 180 metres (660 ft × 590 ft) in size. Three major clusters of cultural artifacts were found, as were a number of minor ones; based on the area surveyed to uncover these features, the site was judged to be that of a large seasonal encampment, involving multiple family units. One of the major clusters had a significant number of stone tools, and the byproducts of their manufacture (debitage), suggesting that area was a specialized work area. The other two major concentrations have a broader array of materials, suggesting that they were living spaces. Most of the stone tools recovered were scrapers and other domestic tools; only one projectile point was found, with a style that was ambiguous as to placement in known historical sequences. The stone from which the tools were made came from a diversity of regional sources.

== See also ==
- National Register of Historic Places listings in Waldo County, Maine
