= Moody Farm =

- U.S. National Register of Historic Places
- Location within Maine Location within the United States
- Location: Jct. of Lawry Rd. and ME 173, Searsmont, Maine
- Coordinates: 44°21′33″N 69°8′56″W
- Area: 63 acres (25 ha)
- Built: 1829
- Architectural style: Federal
- NRHP reference No.: 02001269
- Added to NRHP: October 31, 2002

Moody Farm is a historic farmstead at Lawry Road and Maine State Route 173 in Searsmont, Maine. The farmhouse was built about 1820 by Joseph Moody, one of the first settlers of the area after Maine gained statehood in 1820, and its barn is a mid-19th century double English barn. The property was listed on the National Register of Historic Places in 2002.

== Description and history ==
Moody Farm is located on 93 acres (38 ha) of land in a rural area of eastern Searsmont, with the farmstead complex located at the junction of Lawry Road and Maine State Route 173. The farmhouse stands in the interior of the V created by the two roads with its barn and other farm outbuildings located across Lawry Road. The farmhouse is a 1 1/2-story wood-frame structure, five bays wide, with a side-gable roof, central chimney, clapboard siding, and stone foundation. It has restrained vernacular Federal period styling, with the centered entrance flanked by sidelight windows and pilasters, and topped by a modest entablature. The building interior follows a center-chimney plan, with a narrow vestibule that has a winding staircase, parlor spaces to either side, with the original kitchen positioned behind the chimney. The modern kitchen and other facilities are located in an ell extending behind the main house. One of the rooms has stencilwork consistent with that of an unidentified 19th-century artist whose work extends across northern New England.

Across what is now Lawry Road from the house stands a double barn. The older of the two barns is a traditional English barn, to which a second, mid-19th century barn has been appended. Other outbuildings on the property include a chicken coop and milk shed.

Settlement of this area of Maine was delayed in part by legal issues surrounding portions of the Waldo Patent, which it was a part of. This land was acquired by creditors of Henry Knox, who had attempted to reconstruct the holdings of Samuel Waldo, and died financially insolvent. Joseph Moody, who arrived in Searsmont in 1827, purchased this parcel of land in 1820, and probably built this house soon afterward. It is a well-preserved local example of vernacular late Federal architecture.

== See also ==
- National Register of Historic Places listings in Waldo County, Maine
