= Georges River Canal =

- U.S. National Register of Historic Places
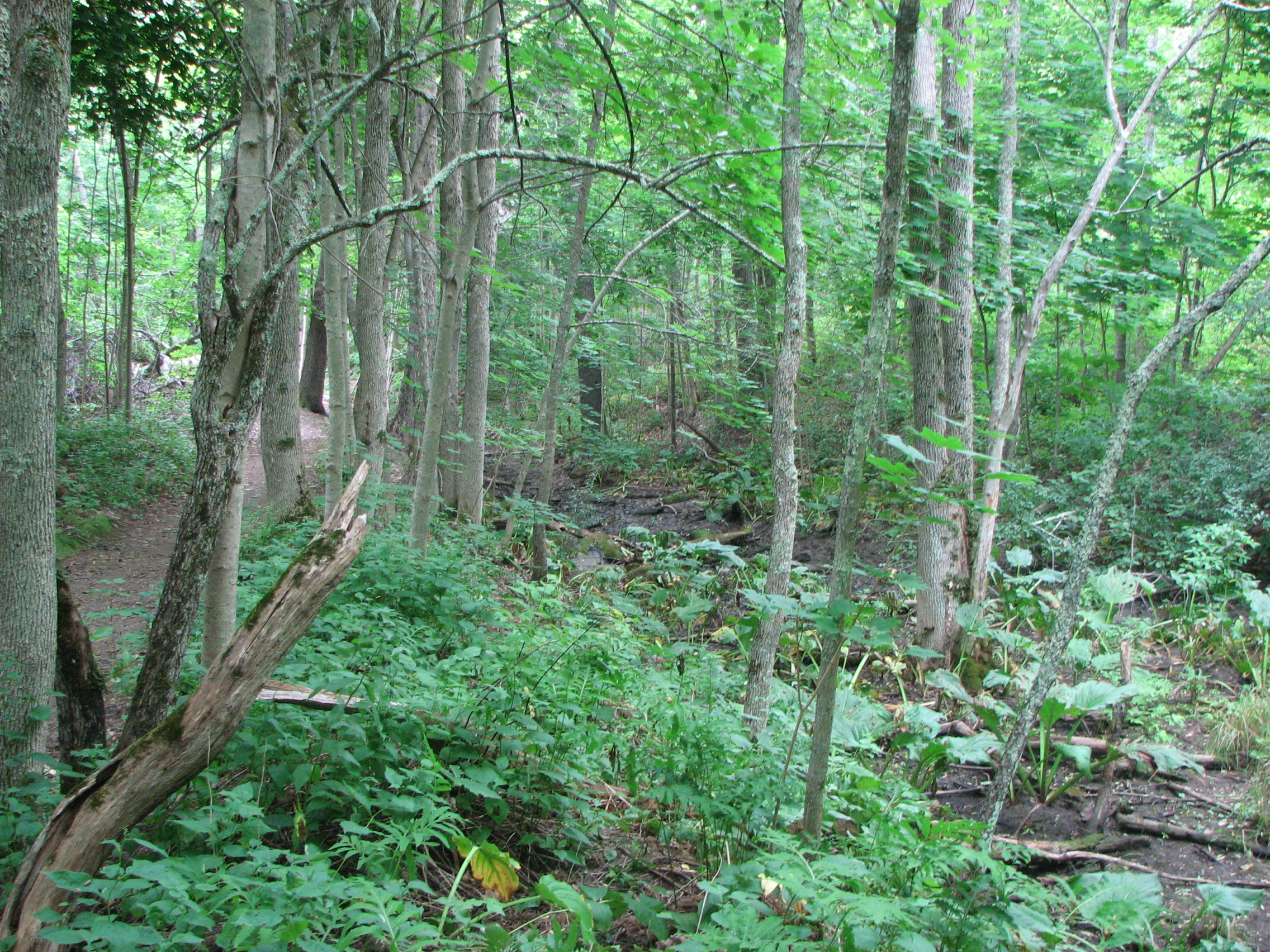
- Remnants of the canal bed in Payson Park, Warren

- Location within Maine Location within the United States
- Location: Upper Falls, Georges River in Warren, Maine to Union town line, extending to Quantabacook Pond in Searsmont
- Coordinates: 44°7′25.7″N 69°14′50″W
- Area: 2,200 acres (890 ha)
- Built: 1846
- NRHP reference No.: 70000048
- Added to NRHP: March 5, 1970

The Georges River Canal, also known as the General Knox Canal, was a short-lived canal that operated on and near the course of the St. George River in Knox and Waldo Counties in south-central Maine. First owned and operated by American Revolutionary War General Henry Knox between 1794 and 1806, it was briefly revived in 1847–50, but was not financially successful. It provided for transport of goods from near the river's headwaters in Searsmont to the head of navigation at Warren. A few elements of the canal survive today, and its route was listed on the National Register of Historic Places in 1970.

== 1793 canal ==
In 1793, Charles Barrett, a local businessman, was granted a charter to establish a canal on the Saint George River to facilitate the transport of lumber. He constructed wooden locks at Warren's Upper Falls and a few miles further upriver at Hart's Falls, enabling river transport as far upstream as Seven Tree Pond in Union. Henry Knox purchased Barrett's operation in 1794, and operated it until his death in 1806. Knox raised the dam at Upper Falls, eliminating the need for the locks at Hart's Falls, also relocating milling operations in the process. The lock was damaged by a spring freshet one year had to be rebuilt. The canal was abandoned after Knox's death, although interest in improved transport along the river continued.

== 1847 canal ==
The success of the Erie Canal in New York and of the Cumberland and Oxford Canal in southern Maine stimulated further interest in the 1820s and 1830s, but it was not until 1846 that the state approved a new plan. Originally authorized to operate as far upstream as Saint George Lake in Liberty, the canal opened in 1847 with service to Quantabacook Lake in Searsmont. Maintenance costs on the canal were high, due to its wooden locks, and the turbulent nature of the river, which necessitated frequent repairs and interrupted transit. The canal ended operations in 1850. In 1865, the dam and lock at Upper Falls were rebuilt in stone, to provide water power for the local mills. It was again rebuilt in 1902, this time to provide hydroelectric power, but was washed out by flooding in 1936.

== Today ==
Only traces of the canal infrastructure survive today, in the form of towpaths and foundational elements of the locks and dams. In Searsmont, the Georges River Land Trust maintains a 3-mile (4.8 km) hiking trail that traverses part of the old towpath, passing several lock remains. In Warren, part of the canal path is visible at Payson Park.

== See also ==
- National Register of Historic Places listings in Waldo County, Maine
- National Register of Historic Places listings in Knox County, Maine
