= Junk of Pork =

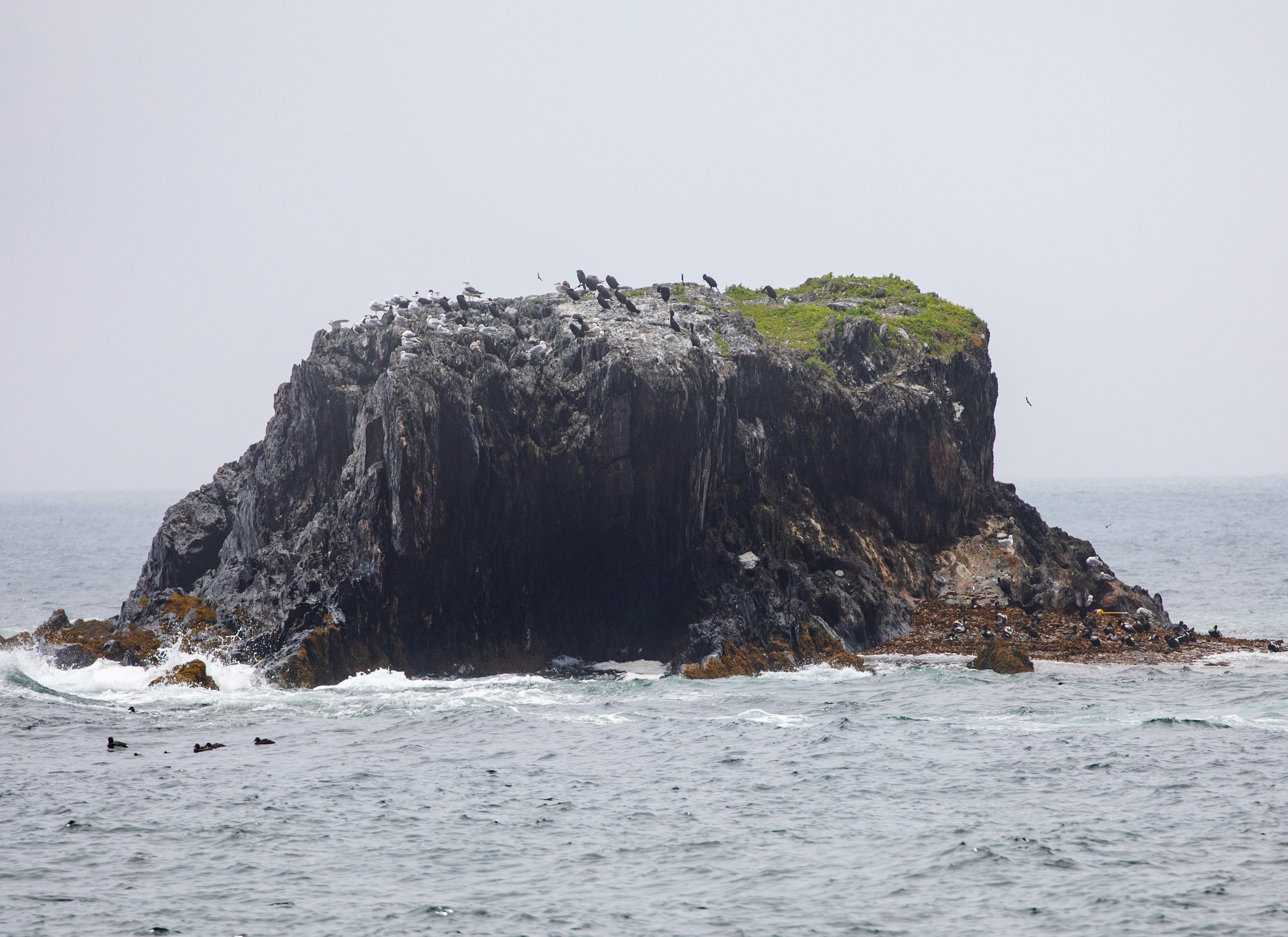
- Junk of Pork with roosting seabirds.

- Location within Maine Location within the United States
- Nearest city: Long Island, Maine
- Coordinates: 43°38′51″N 70°07′19″W
- Area: less than one acre (listed area)

Junk of Pork is a small sea stack islet in Portland, Maine. It is located 4.5 miles offshore in outer Casco Bay, next to Outer Green Island, and is owned by the Maine Department of Inland Fisheries and Wildlife as part of the Alan E. Hutchinson (Coast of Maine) Wildlife Management Area. It is one of three Maine Islands of the same name.

== Description ==
The oblong islet is approximately 200 feet long by 50 feet wide and 40 feet tall at its peak. Junk of Pork has only sparse, grassy vegetation, but is a roosting or nesting site for seabirds, including common eider, black guillemot, American herring gull, common tern, double-crested cormorant and osprey. Outer Green Island is 800 feet to the northwest and at very low tides the islands can connect.

== History and nomenclature ==
Junk is an antiquated nineteenth century rhyming slang term for a hunk or chunk. The island may be named for its resemblance to a slab of meat, or for the folkloric bartered purchase of the island from the Pejepscot Wabanakiyak.

In January 1891, the coal schooner Ada Barker went aground on Junk of Pork near Outer Green Island. The crew clambered onto the rock along the collapsed foremast, with minutes to spare before the waves smashed the ship. The crew survived on the rock until the U.S. revenue cutter Levi Woodbury rescued them after hours of exposure to the storm.

== See also ==
- List of islands of Maine
