= Mill at Freedom Falls =

- U.S. National Register of Historic Places
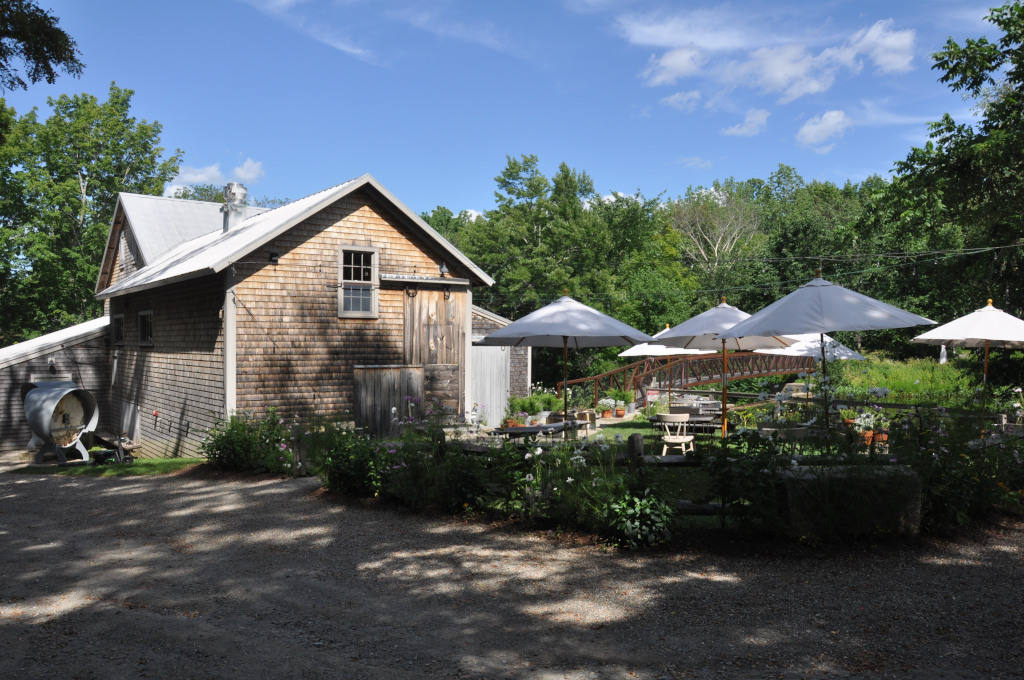

- Location within Maine Location within the United States
- Location: South side of Mill St., 125 feet (38 m) west of Pleasant St., Freedom, Maine
- Coordinates: 44°31′41″N 69°17′49″W
- Area: less than one acre
- Built: 1834
- NRHP reference No.: 12000228
- Added to NRHP: April 19, 2012

The Mill at Freedom Falls is a historic mill complex at Mill and Pleasant Streets in Freedom, Maine. The main building, constructed in 1834, is the only mill built at this site, and the only one to survive (of several built) nearly unaltered in the village. The mill and its surviving dam were listed on the National Register of Historic Places.

== Description and history ==
The Mill at Freedom Falls is set in the village of Freedom, a rural community in western Waldo County, Maine. It is located south of Pleasant Street and east of Mill Street, on the west bank of Sandy Stream. It is a two-story timber-framed structure, set on a foundation of granite and rubblestone that is open to the stream. Attached to the main structure are a series of gabled and shed-roofed ells. A short way upstream from the mill stands its dam, a concrete and stone structure built about 1829 and rebuilt in 1927. Remnants of a concrete tailrace are visible below the mill.

The village of Freedom was established in part because of a significant water drop (about 70 feet (21 m)) on Sandy Stream in a relatively short distance, providing an ideal location for early grist- and sawmills. During the 19th century this area supported a number of diverse water-powered operations, all of whose structures have either been demolished or significantly altered. This mill was built in 1834 by John True, owner of another gristmill on the stream, and was also initially used for milling grain. In 1894, with local agriculture in decline, the mill was converted into a turning mill, producing tool handles and other items. A sawmill was built across the stream to cut raw lumber into stock for its operations; this mill, and a building that joined the two by spanning the stream, have not survived. This mill was closed in 1969 and abandoned. It has since been converted into a restaurant, school, and other businesses.

== See also ==
- National Register of Historic Places listings in Waldo County, Maine
