= College Club Inn =

- U.S. National Register of Historic Places
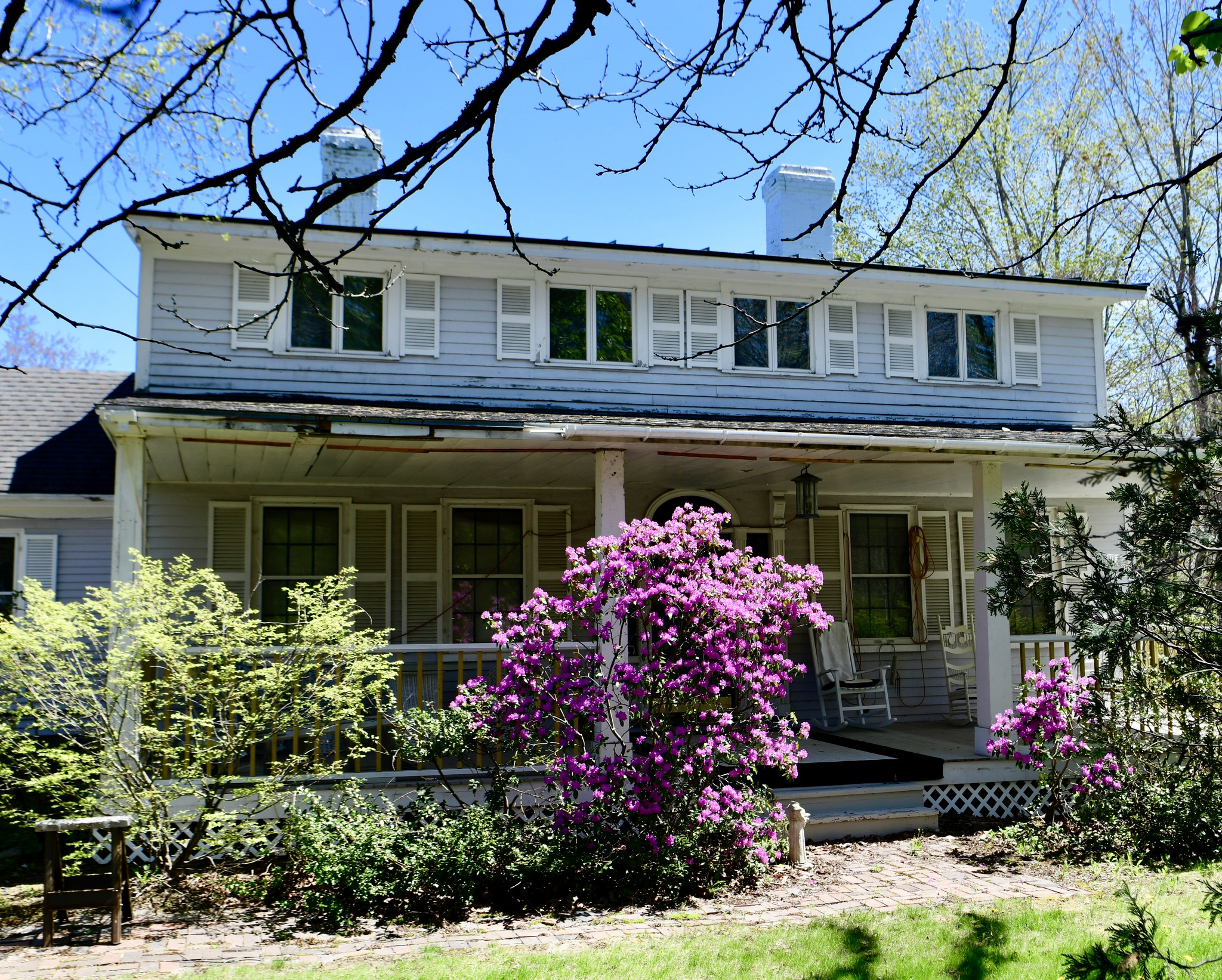

- Location within Maine Location within the United States
- Location: 190 W. Main St., Searsport, Maine
- Coordinates: 44°26′40″N 68°56′7″W
- Area: 3.5 acres (1.4 ha)
- Built: 1920
- Architectural style: Federal, Greek Revival
- NRHP reference No.: 00000377
- Added to NRHP: April 14, 2000

Watchtide by the Sea, once known as the College Club Inn, is a historic traveler accommodation at 190 West Main Street (United States Route 1) in Searsport, Maine. Based around an early 19th-century house and developed as an inn and tea room in the early 20th century, the property exemplifies the adaptive reuse of older properties for the tourist trade in Maine. It was listed on the National Register of Historic Places in 2000.

== Description and history ==
Watchtide by the Sea is set on the southeast side of US 1, roughly midway between downtown Searsport and Moose Point State Park. The inn consists of a 1-1/2 story Cape style house, which is connected by a long single-story ell extending to its left to a converted barn. The Cape is five bays wide, with a side gable roof and end chimneys, and has a porch extending across its front and a full-width shed-roof dormer above. The ell has smaller shed-roof dormers, which was also found on the barn's southern roof. The interior of the Cape has Greek Revival styling, and is organized in a typical Federal period central hall plan, enlarged by the presence of the dormer above, and an enclosed porch to the rear.

The house was built about 1800, and was acquired in 1902 by George and Rose Pettee for use as a summer house. Eleanor Roosevelt was among the most well known of their guests, staying on occasion to escape the sweltering summers of Washington, DC. A number of the enlargements and alterations were made during the Pettees' ownership, and the property was opened as a tea room and inn by their daughter Frances in 1917, known as the "College Club T House". Still under the Pettees' ownership, it operated under several variants of the "College Club" name through 1953. Although this practice of converting older buildings for use in the tourist trade was quite common in Maine, there are relatively few well-preserved examples, of which this is one.

== See also ==
- National Register of Historic Places listings in Waldo County, Maine
