= Greer's Corner School =

- U.S. National Register of Historic Places
- Location within Maine Location within the United States
- Nearest city: SE corner of Back Belmont and Lincolnville Road, Belmont Corner, Maine
- Coordinates: 44°22′28″N 69°07′47″W
- Area: less than one acre
- Built: 1908
- Built by: Edmund Brewster
- NRHP reference No.: 91001513
- Added to NRHP: October 16, 1991

The Greer's Corner School is an historic school in Belmont Corner, Maine. Built in 1908, it is the only surviving one-room schoolhouse in the rural community. It was listed on the National Register of Historic Places in 1991.

== Description and history ==
The Greer's Corner School is located in western Belmont, at the southeast corner of Back Belmont Road and Lincolnville Road, a junction known locally as Greer's Corner. The school is a small single-story wood-frame structure, with a gabled roof, wooden clapboard siding, and a granite foundation. A small gabled wing, housing privy toilets, projects to the south. The main facade faces west, and has centrally-placed windows on the first floor and in the attic level, with the entrance set to the right, sheltered by a bracketed hood. On the interior, the walls are finished with vertical tongue-and-groove wainscoting, with plaster above and on the ceiling. Original blackboards are located on two walls. The privies are finished entirely in horizontal tongue-and-groove paneling.

At the turn of the 20th century, the rural community of Belmont had five school districts, and it was reported in 1907 that the school at Greer's Corner was its oldest. The following year this building was constructed by Edmund Brewster at a cost of about $550. The school was used until 1953, when the town opened a consolidated school on the diagonally opposite corner. The building then housed town offices until the early 1980s. It has since been taken over and restored by the local historical society.

== See also ==
- National Register of Historic Places listings in Waldo County, Maine
