= Seven Star Grange, No. 73 =

- U.S. National Register of Historic Places
- Location within Maine Location within the United States
- Location: 696 Bangor Rd., Troy, Maine
- Coordinates: 44°39′46″N 69°15′26″W
- Area: less than one acre
- Built: 1876
- Architectural style: Bungalow/Craftsman
- NRHP reference No.: 11000817
- Added to NRHP: November 18, 2011

The Seven Star Grange is a historic Grange hall at 696 Bangor Road in Troy, Maine. Built in 1876, it is one of the state's oldest Grange halls, and has been an important community and social event venue for the rural community since then. It was listed on the National Register of Historic Places in 2011.

== Description and history ==
The Seven Star Grange is located in central Troy, on the south side of Bangor Road (United States Route 202) near its junction with Rogers Road. It is a tall two story wood frame structure, with a gable roof, clapboard siding, and a granite foundation. The front facade has evenly-spaced windows on the second floor and attic level, and an irregular first floor, with sash windows flanking a double door on the left side, and a single-leaf door near the corner on the right. The building corners are pilastered, with entablatures running along the sides. The original part of the building is four bays deep, with a two-story addition extending to the rear. The interior's principal spaces are a meeting and dining hall on the ground floor, and an auditorium with stage on the second.

The Seven Star Grange was organized in 1874, the second year in which the Patrons of Husbandry organized chapters in the state. The present building was constructed in 1876, and initially housed meeting facilities and a small cooperative store, then a fairly typical feature of Grange organizations. The stage addition was added in 1931, and at some point in the 20th century the space that housed the store was converted into kitchen for the downstairs dining space.

== See also ==
- National Register of Historic Places listings in Waldo County, Maine
