= Archeological Site No. 29-64 =

Prehistoric archaeological site in Islesboro, Maine, United States

- U.S. National Register of Historic Places
- Nearest city: Islesboro, Maine
- Area: 4 acres (1.6 ha)
- Built: 0500
- NRHP reference No.: 82000782
- Added to NRHP: February 22, 1982

Archeological Site No. 29-64 is a prehistoric archaeological site in Islesboro, Maine. The site encompasses a shell midden, in which are embedded the remains of semi-subterranean pit-house structures. It is one of the best-preserved examples of this type in northeastern North America. The site was listed on the National Register of Historic Places in 1982.

== Description ==
Islesboro is an island community in Penobscot Bay, a deep indentation on the coast of Maine that bisects its coastline. On one of its east-facing coastlines stands a large shell midden that was surveyed by archaeologists from the Maine State Museum and partially excavated in 1980. The midden's surface exhibited a series of crater-like depressions, which were hypothesized before excavation to correspond to house pits. They were organized in two rows of three, running parallel to the coastline and varied in diameter between 3 and 4 metres (9.8 and 13.1 ft).

In the 1980 excavation a trench 13 metres (43 ft) long was dug through several of these features, and confirmed the assessment. Each feature had about 20 centimetres (7.9 in) of sterile soil laid on top of a habitation layer containing fire-cracked rock, charcoal, pottery fragments, stone tools, and evidence of stone tool manufacture (debitage). These circular areas were surrounded by banks of clamshells that had slumped over time. Trenches through the shell deposits led away from these features, with additional refuse-type finds deposited to either side. The stone and ceramic finds are consistent with finds elsewhere in the region dated to about 500 CE.

These house pits are remarkably well-preserved, having avoided erosion and vandalism, which affect many sites in the northeastern United States and Atlantic Canada that have similar features. Because these types of houses were not in use by Native American communities by the time of European contact, these types of sites form an important window into the area's prehistory.

== See also ==
- National Register of Historic Places listings in Waldo County, Maine
