= Ebenezer Knowlton =

American politician

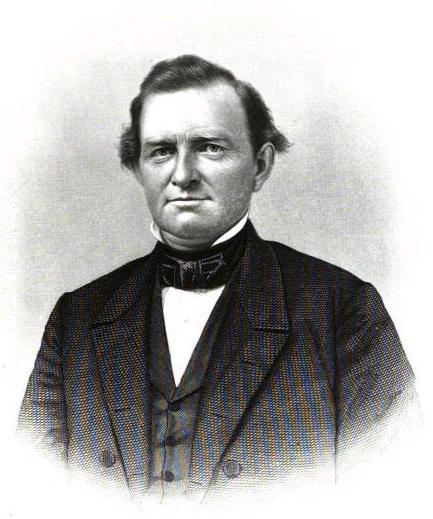

Member of U.S. House of Representatives from Maine's 3rd district
- In office March 4, 1855 – March 3, 1857
- Preceded by: E. Wilder Farley
- Succeeded by: Nehemiah Abbott

18th Speaker of the Maine House of Representatives
- In office 1846–1847
- Preceded by: Moses Macdonald
- Succeeded by: Hugh Dean McLellan

Member of the Maine House of Representatives
- In office 1844–1850

Personal details
- Born: 6 December 1815 Pittsfield, New Hampshire, United States
- Died: 10 September 1874 (aged 58) South Montville, Maine, US
- Party: Republican
- Occupation: Minister, Congressman

Ebenezer Knowlton (December 6, 1815 – September 10, 1874) was a U.S. representative from Maine, and Free Will Baptist minister.

== Biography ==
Born in Pittsfield, New Hampshire, Knowlton moved with his parents to South Montville, Maine, in 1825. He attended the China and Waterville Academies in Maine. He studied theology and entered the ministry as a Free Will Baptist.

== Career ==
Knowlton served as a member of the Maine House of Representatives from 1844 to 1850, and served as speaker in 1846. Knowlton was elected as a Republican candidate to the Thirty-fourth Congress from March 4, 1855 to March 3, 1857. He was a lifelong supporter of abolitionism and the temperance movement.

Knowlton served as trustee of Bates College in Lewiston, Maine. Knowlton also served as a trustee of Colby College and Maine Central Institute, and after the Civil War he worked for the Freedmen's Bureau in Beaufort, South Carolina.

He was a corporator of the Morning Star, a Free Will Baptist newspaper, and was president of the Foreign Missions Board. Knowlton continued his ministerial duties until his death.

== Death ==
Knowlton died in South Montville, Maine on September 10, 1874.

== See also ==
- Ebenezer Knowlton House

U.S. House of Representatives
Preceded by E. Wilder Farley	Member of the U.S. House of Representatives from Maine's 3rd congressional district March 4, 1855 – March 3, 1857	Succeeded by Nehemiah Abbott
Political offices
Preceded by Moses Macdonald	18th Speaker of the Maine House of Representatives; 1846-1847	Succeeded by Hugh Dean McLellan
