= Free Will Baptist Church and Cemetery =

Historic site in Waldo County, Maine, US

- U.S. National Register of Historic Places
- Location within Maine Location within the United States
- Nearest city: North Islesboro, Maine
- Coordinates: 44°21′11″N 68°53′41″W
- Area: 1.4 acres (0.57 ha)
- Built: 1843
- Architectural style: Greek Revival
- NRHP reference No.: 88000891
- Added to NRHP: September 27, 1988

The Free Will Baptist Church and Cemetery is a historic church property on Church Turn Road in North Islesboro, Maine. Built in 1843 and enlarged in the 1890s, the church is a fine example of Greek Revival architecture, and is particularly noted for its well-preserved mid-19th century stenciled artwork, whose quality and level of preservation are among the best in the state. The property was listed on the National Register of Historic Places in 1988. It is now owned by a local nonprofit organization.

== Description and history ==
The town of Islesboro occupies an eponymous island in Penobscot Bay, on the central Maine coast. The island is roughly shaped as two lobes joined by a narrow isthmus. The former Free Will Baptist Church property stands near the center of the northern lobe, on the north side of Church Turn Road. The church is surrounded on three sides by the cemetery, which is about 1 acre (0.40 ha) in size. It is a single-story wood-frame structure, with a front-facing gable roof, primarily weatherboard siding, and a granite foundation. Its front facade, facing south, is symmetrical, with a pair of entrances flanking a single sash window. Each entrance is flanked by pilasters and topped by an entablature with cornice. A square tower rises from the ridge just behind the front, with a low first stage, a taller flushboarded belfry stage with round-arch louvered openings, and a simple octagonal spire. To the rear, a two-story cross-gabled vestry section was added in 1894.

The church interior has three groups of original wooden pews, with two aisles providing access. The walls are finished in plaster, which has been painted and stenciled. The walls at the back of the sanctuary are particularly noteworthy, with three round-arch panels of artwork flanked by rectangular ones. The outer of these panels are decorated with stenciled rustic motifs, while those in the center have a more Classical inspiration. The rustic themes are continued in bands above the pews and around the walls. While other examples of mid-to-late 19th-century artwork survive in Maine, none employ this type of stencilwork.

The Free Will Baptist congregation of Islesboro was organized in 1821, and met for twenty years in private residences, schoolhouses, and other locations. By 1840 the congregation had grown sufficiently to warrant construction of a dedicated space, and the present build was constructed about 1843, probably by a local builder. The artwork, traditionally ascribed to an itinerant French painter in the 1840s, is stylistically more typical of the 1870s. Regular services were held in the church until 1921, after which they took place more sporadically. In 1983 the Society for the Preservation of the Free Will Baptist Church of Islesboro was established, and it now maintains the church and cemetery.

== See also ==
- National Register of Historic Places listings in Waldo County, Maine
