= Black Horse Tavern (Belfast, Maine) =

- U.S. National Register of Historic Places
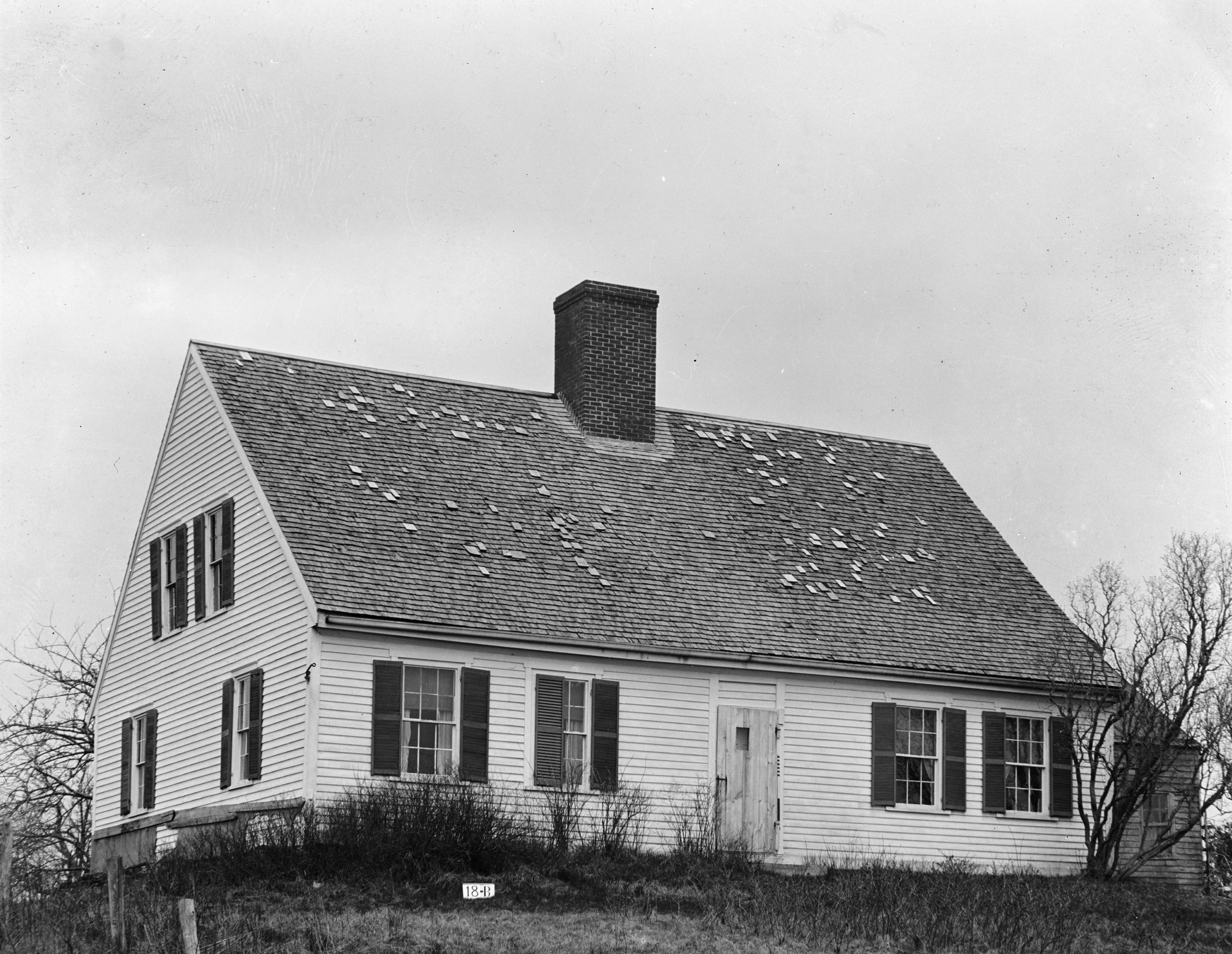
- Front of the Black Horse Tavern located along Searsport Avenue, 1936 HABS photo

- Location within Maine Location within the United States
- Location: Searsport Avenue, Belfast, Maine
- Coordinates: 44°25′44″N 68°59′2″W
- Area: less than one acre
- Built: 1795
- Architectural style: Cape Cod
- NRHP reference No.: 82000783
- Added to NRHP: February 11, 1982

The Black Horse Tavern is an historic tavern on Searsport Avenue in Belfast, Maine. Built in 1795, it was the city's first tavern located on the eastern side of the Passagassawakeag River, and is a well-preserved example of vernacular Federal period architecture. The building, now a private residence, was added to the National Register of Historic Places in 1982.

== Description and history ==
The building known in the 19th century as the Black Horse Tavern stands on the north side of Searsport Avenue (United States Route 1), near the mouth of the Passagassawakeag River and between Old Searsport Avenue and Stephenson Lane. It is a 1 1/2-story wood-frame Cape style house, five bays wide, with a side-gable roof, central chimney, clapboard siding, and stone foundation. Its main facade faces roughly east, and the main entrance, located at the center, has no trim. A single-story ell, a 20th-century replacement for an older ell, extends to the north, with two gabled dormers projecting from the roof. The interior of the main house is well preserved, with wide pine wainscoting, large fireplaces in both front rooms, with simple vertical-board partitions in the rear. Original doors and frames are still generally in use.

The house was built about 1795 by Jerome Stephenson, a veteran of the American Revolutionary War who moved to Belfast in 1784. Stephenson was prominent in local civic affairs, serving as selectman in 1785. Although he built the house for his family, he converted it into a tavern in 1800, a role it fulfilled under is son and grandson, until about 1852. The sign used to identify the tavern is now stored in the house.

== See also ==
- National Register of Historic Places listings in Waldo County, Maine
