= Marsh School =

- U.S. National Register of Historic Places
- Location within Maine Location within the United States
- Location: 930 Bangor Rd., Prospect, Maine
- Coordinates: 44°33′4″N 68°51′53″W
- Area: less than one acre
- Built: c. 1880
- NRHP reference No.: 13000188
- Added to NRHP: April 23, 2013

The Marsh School is an historic school at 930 Bangor Road in Prospect, Maine. Built about 1880, it is the only surviving one-room schoolhouse in the rural community, and also served for a time as its town hall. It was listed on the National Register of Historic Places in 2013.

== Description and history ==
The Marsh School is located in central Prospect, on the west side of Bangor Road (United States Route 1A) on the southern fringe of the town's dispersed rural village center, and in front of Maple Grove Cemetery, whose entrance lies just to the north. The school is a small single-story wood frame structure, with a gabled roof, wooden clapboard siding, and a granite foundation. A small shed-roof addition projects from the rear of the southern side. The main facade, facing east, is three bays wide, with the entrance in the left bay, and sash windows in the other two bays and at the attic level. The north and west sides are characterized by bands of sash windows; the north side has a secondary entrance at its far western end. The interior of the main block has an entry hall and closet across the front, and a single large classroom, which still retains some original features. The addition, originally built to house a woodshed and privy, was probably rebuilt in the 1960s, and now houses a bathroom and furnace.

This building has traditionally been given a construction date of 1836, but its architectural styling and workmanship suggest it is more likely that it was built sometime after the American Civil War, with a possible reuse of older materials from an earlier building. With an estimated construction date of 1880, it would be the third schoolhouse built by the town, a function it served until 1963. During this time, it was also used as a polling place and site for town meetings. In 1961 the town consolidated its schools with neighboring Verona, and its other surviving district school was demolished. The present building, closed as a school in 1963, was refurbished with new floors and other alterations, and continued to be used for town offices and meetings for several decades. It now stands vacant.

== See also ==
- National Register of Historic Places listings in Waldo County, Maine
