= North Branch Marsh River =

Location
- Country: United States

Physical characteristics
- Source
  - location: Maine

The North Branch Marsh River is a 1.0-mile-long (1.6 km) tidal river in the town of Frankfort, Waldo County, Maine. It is a tributary of Marsh Bay, an arm of the tidal Penobscot River.

The North Branch Marsh River is fed by Marsh Stream, a 33.6-mile-long (54.1 km) river in central Maine. Marsh Stream rises at 44°28′52″N 69°13′01″W on the north slopes of Frye Mountain, on the boundary between the towns of Montville and Knox. It flows northeast through Knox, Brooks, and Monroe, then becomes the boundary between the towns of Winterport and Frankfort. Turning southeast, the stream flows through the village of Frankfort, where it reaches tidewater and becomes the North Branch Marsh River.

== See also ==
- List of rivers of Maine
