= Brooks station =

- (Former) Maine Central Railroad Depot
- U.S. National Register of Historic Places
- Location within Maine Location within the United States
- Location: ME Rt. 7, Brooks, Maine
- Coordinates: 44°33′2″N 69°7′21″W
- Area: 1 acre (0.40 ha)
- Built: 1892
- Architectural style: Queen Anne, Stick/eastlake
- NRHP reference No.: 09000595
- Added to NRHP: August 5, 2009

The Former Maine Central Railroad Depot is a historic railroad station on Maine State Route 7 in Brooks, Maine. Built in 1892, it is an extremely well-preserved and little-altered example of a Queen Anne railroad depot. It served as a passenger depot until 1960 and as a freight depot thereafter. It is owned by the Brooks Historical Society. It was listed on the National Register of Historic Places in 2009.

== Description and history ==
The former railroad depot of the Maine Central Railroad is near the southern fringe of the village of Brooks, on the west side of Moosehead Trail (Maine State Route 7) just south of the railroad tracks, which are separated from the village center by Marsh Stream. It is a single-story wood-frame structure, with a hip roof and a mostly granite stone foundation. The roof has a deep overhang, which is supported by large, decoratively-cut brackets. The building is sheathed in a variety of materials, with diagonally set tongue-and-groove planking at the lower level, clapboards at the central level, and decorative cut shingles at the upper level. Its interior is divided into three rooms: the agent's office, a large waiting area, and a restroom. Outside the station stands a semaphore signal that is still mechanically operable by controls in the agent's office.

The rail line that passes through Brooks was built in 1870 as part of a project by the city of Belfast to develop a railroad serving the Canadian province of Quebec. Conceived as the Belfast and Moosehead Lake Railroad, the tracks were built by the Maine Central Railroad (MEC) to connect Belfast to coastal communities further south. The MEC built its first station in Brooks in 1881 and the present station in 1892 after the first was destroyed by fire. The station served as an important element of the local economy for many years, serving as a passenger depot until 1960 and as a means by which the products of a local cheese factory reached market. After 1960 the building was used for a time as a freight depot, and ownership was reverted to the city of Belfast. The station is owned by the Brooks Historical Society, which also operates restored rolling stock as a heritage railroad in the summer months.

== See also ==
- National Register of Historic Places listings in Waldo County, Maine

Preceding station	Maine Central Railroad	Following station
Thorndike toward Burnham Junction	Belfast Branch	Belfast Terminus
