= Islesboro Free Library =

- U.S. National Register of Historic Places
- Location within Maine Location within the United States
- Location: Main Rd., Islesboro, Maine
- Coordinates: 44°18′9″N 68°54′4″W
- Area: less than one acre
- Built: 1917
- Architectural style: Colonial Revival
- MPS: Maine Public Libraries MPS
- NRHP reference No.: 88003018
- Added to NRHP: January 5, 1989

The Alice T. Pendleton Memorial Library is the public library of Islesboro, Maine. It is located at 309 Main Road, in an architecturally distinguished Colonial Revival building built in 1917, which is listed on the National Register of Historic Places. Previously known simply as the Islesboro Free Library, it was named in honor of Alice Pendleton, the town's first librarian and a major force in the library's establishment.

== Architecture and history ==
The town of Islesboro occupies an eponymous island in Penobscot Bay, on the central Maine coast. The island is roughly shaped as two lobes joined by a narrow isthmus. The library is located on the east side of Main Road, just north of its junction with County Road, in the northern part of the southern lobe. It is a single-story masonry structure, built out of random ashlar granite with brick trim. The main facade, facing west, is symmetrical, with a center entrance sheltered by a Colonial Revival portico supported by groups of slender tapered Tuscan columns. The door, glassed in its upper half, is flanked by wide sidelights and topped by a low half-oval fanlight. The interior is arranged with a central circulating desk, reading rooms to either side, and book stacks in the basement and to the rear, where a cross-gabled section extends.

The library was established in 1902 by a vote of the town meeting, and was at first housed on the second floor of a local school. The inadequacy of this space prompted a drive for the construction of a more suitable home, resulting in the construction in 1917-18 of this building. Its architect is now known, nor is it known if there was an original intent that it also serve as a war memorial. Plaques in the entry commemorate the town's war dead, and the flagpole and commemorative base that stand in front of the library were placed in 1921.

Alice T. Pendleton was a professional librarian appointed the town's first librarian in 1902. She was active in building the town's collection, and in leading the effort to have a permanent home for it. Even after moving away from Islesboro in 1925, she continued to support the library, serving as assistant librarian during summer visits. The library was renamed in her honor in 1956.

== See also ==
- National Register of Historic Places listings in Waldo County, Maine
