= Troy Meeting House =

Historic church in Maine, United States

- U.S. National Register of Historic Places
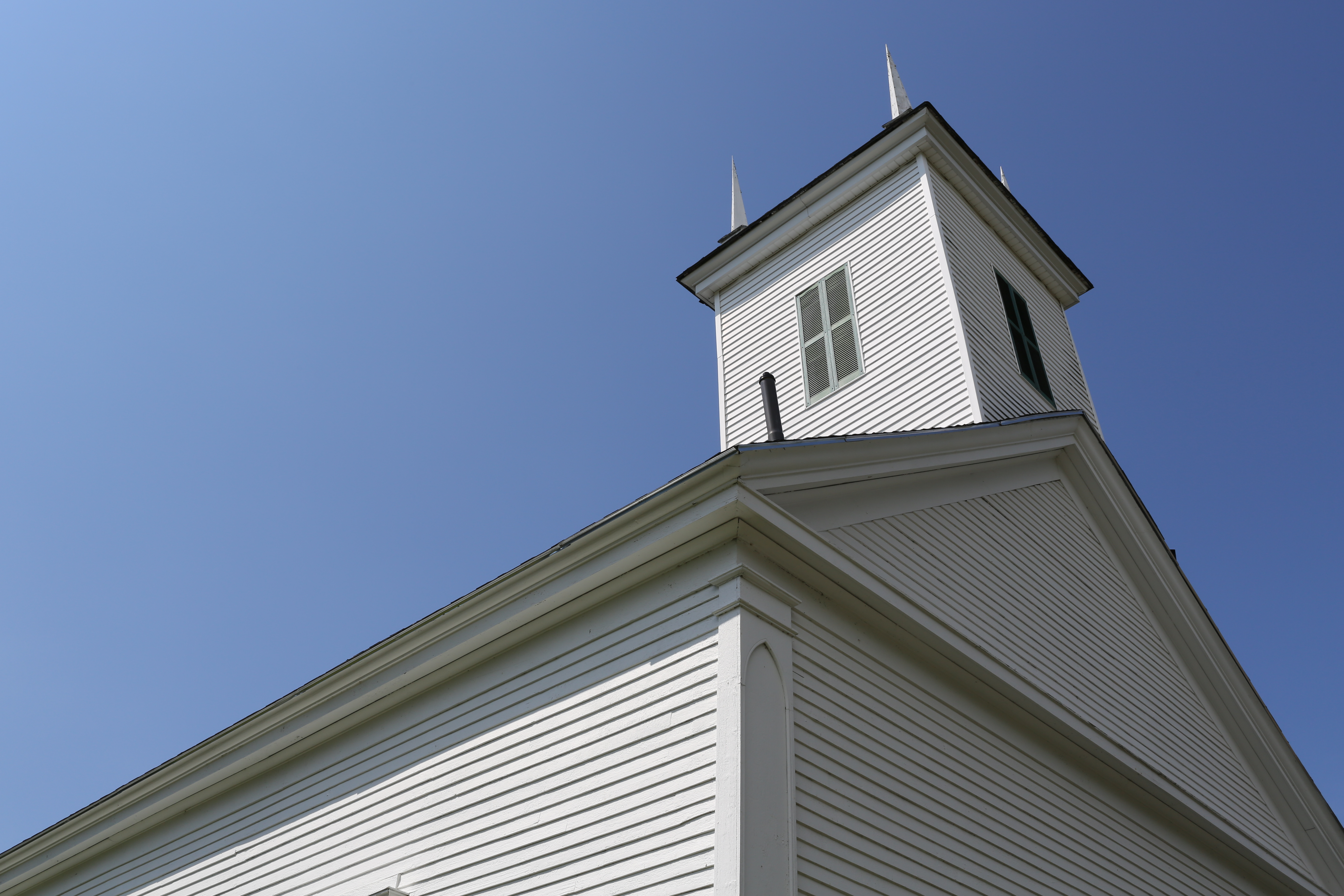

- Location within Maine Location within the United States
- Location: 514 Bangor Rd., Troy, Maine
- Coordinates: 44°39′54″N 69°14′23″W
- Area: 0.23 acres (0.093 ha)
- Built: 1840
- Architectural style: Greek Revival, Gothic Revival
- NRHP reference No.: 11000818
- Added to NRHP: November 18, 2011

The Troy Meeting House, also known as the Troy Union Church, is a historic church at 514 Bangor Road (Maine State Route 9) in Troy, Maine. Built in 1840, it is a fine example of transitional vernacular Greek Revival-Gothic Revival architecture, and an enduring symbol of the religious life of the community. It was listed on the National Register of Historic Places in 2011.

== Description and history ==
The Troy Meeting House is located in a small crossroads hamlet known as Troy Corner, formed by the junction of Bangor Road (the major east-west route through Troy) and Ward Hill and Bagley Hill Roads. It is set a short way east of this junction, on the south side of Bangor Road, in a small open lot now surrounded by forest. It is a modest single-story wood frame structure, with a gabled roof, clapboard siding, and a granite foundation. It has a timber frame built out of hand-hewn members, and was built using traditional scribe-rule methods. The building corners have pilasters with lancet-arched paneling, which rise to a simple entablature. The front facade is symmetrical, with a pair of entrances flanking a central sash window. The entrances are topped by lancet-arched trim and flanked by paneled pilasters similar to those on the building corners. A single-stage square tower rises above, with rectangular louvered openings and a pinnacles at the corners above.

The church was built in 1840 as a non-denominational "union" church, available for use by any local denomination. It was probably built by members of the Troy Meeting House Society, and has served the community as a religious meeting place since then, except for a seven-year period of closure during World War II. It is the community's oldest church, and its only 19th-century church building still in ecclesiastical use.

== See also ==
- National Register of Historic Places listings in Waldo County, Maine
