= Mortland Family Farm =

- U.S. National Register of Historic Places
- U.S. Historic district
- Location within Maine Location within the United States
- Nearest city: Searsport, Maine
- Coordinates: 44°28′38″N 68°55′21″W
- Area: 16.3 acres (6.6 ha)
- Built: 1834
- Architectural style: Greek Revival
- NRHP reference No.: 91001510
- Added to NRHP: October 24, 1991

The Mortland Family Farm is a historic farmstead on Mortland Road in Searsport, Maine. Begun in 1834 and altered and enlarged until about 1950, it is a well-preserved example of a New England connected farmstead, a property type that has become increasingly rare in Maine. The farm, at 16.3 acres (6.6 ha) a fraction of its greatest extent, was listed on the National Register of Historic Places in 1991.

== Description and history ==
The Mortland Family Farm is located in rural inland Searsport, on the east side of Mortland Road. Surviving elements of the farmstead include the 1834 Greek Revival stone Cape style farmhouse, two 19th-century barns, and wood-frame ells joining the elements. A modern (1950s) dairy shed is attached to one of the barns, and the 16.3-acre (6.6 ha) also includes a cellar hole believed to be the site of the first house on the property. The property includes two meadows, formerly in agricultural use, and a remnant apple orchard.

The property was first settled in the 1820s by the family of Samuel Mortland, an Irish immigrant, who at first lived in a crude log structure. In 1834 he built the surviving rubblestone Cape. The property was owned by five generations of Mortlands, and was sold out of the family in 1985. At its greatest extent, the farm in the 1850s consisted of more than 68 acres (28 ha) of land, and it is during the 1860s that the house was enlarged. The barns were added in the 1890s, one of them built with materials salvaged from a nearby older barn. In the 20th century the farm was primarily as a dairy operation.

== See also ==
- National Register of Historic Places listings in Waldo County, Maine
