= Springdale Farm (Burnham, Maine) =

- U.S. National Register of Historic Places
- U.S. Historic district
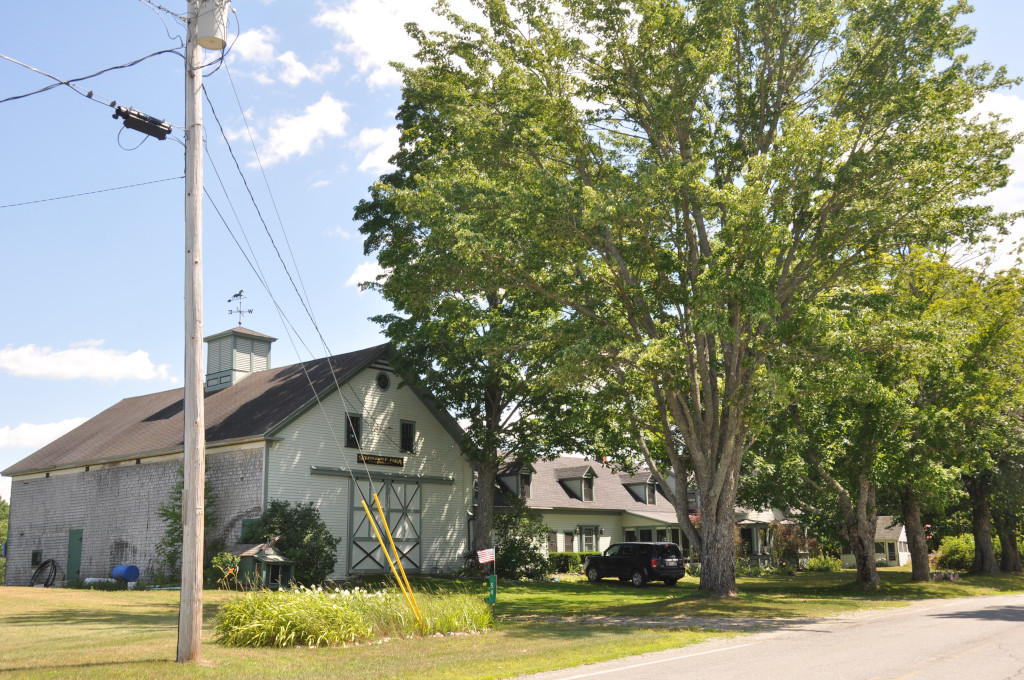

- Location within Maine Location within the United States
- Location: Horseback Rd., 0.5 mi. S of Troy Rd., Burnham, Maine
- Coordinates: 44°40′59″N 69°21′57″W
- Area: 100 acres (40 ha)
- Built: 1870
- Architectural style: Late Victorian
- NRHP reference No.: 00000374
- Added to NRHP: April 24, 2000

Springdale Farm is a historic farm property on Horseback Road in Burnham, Maine. The 100-acre (40 ha) farm property includes a virtually intact 1870s farm complex with a period connected farmhouse and barn. The property was listed on the National Register of Historic Places in 2000.

== Description and history ==
Springdale farm is located in eastern Burnham, a rural community in northwestern Waldo County. The farm's current size is 100 acres (40 ha), down from a reported maximum of 600 acres (240 ha), consisting of about 60 acres (24 ha) of cleared land, and the balance in woodland. The farm complex is located on the east side of Horseback Road, about 0.5 miles (0.80 km) south of Troy Road. The connected complex is arrayed with the house at the southern end, with ells extending north to the barn. Secondary farm buildings stand north and east of the barn, and there is summer sleeping house south of the main house. The house has an Italianate exterior, with a bracketed entry hood, and bay windows with paneled corner boards and skirting. The interior of the main house has been completely modernized; the attached ell retains some 19th-century features.

The early settlement history of the property is uncertain; an 1859 map of the area shows a house standing, ownership attributed to C. Reynolds. The present house is stylistically from a later period, and was probably built about 1870, along with the barn. The barn is built of hand-hewn timbers, and is unusual for its purlin roof framing, which is not normally found on barns this large. The farm property remained in the hands of members of the Reynolds family until 1977.

== See also ==
- National Register of Historic Places listings in Waldo County, Maine
