= Ebenezer Knowlton House =

Historic house in Maine, United States

- U.S. National Register of Historic Places
- Location within Maine Location within the United States
- Location: Choate Rd., Montville, Maine
- Coordinates: 44°22′44″N 69°16′3″W
- Area: 50 acres (20 ha)
- Built: 1827
- Architectural style: Federal
- NRHP reference No.: 01001433
- Added to NRHP: January 11, 2002

The Ebenezer Knowlton House is a historic house on Choate Road in Montville, Maine. Built c. 1827, the property, which includes two period barns, is a well-preserved example of vernacular late Federal period architecture. The property is also notable as the childhood home of Rev. Ebenezer Knowlton, Jr., a Free Will Baptist minister and a trustee of Bates College in Lewiston, Maine, and Colby College, in Waterville, Maine. The house was added to the National Register of Historic Places in 2002.

== Description and history ==
The Knowlton House is located in southern Montville, a rural inland community in western Waldo County, Maine. It is set on the northwest side of Choate Road, at a four-way junction where Choate Road becomes Sumner Martin Road, and the crossing road is an old (and now unmaintained) county road. The house is a 1 1/2-story wood-frame Cape style structure, five bays wide, with a side-gable roof, central chimney, clapboard siding, and stone foundation. The front facade, facing southeast, is symmetrical, with a center entrance that is simply framed, and is topped by a four-light transom window. An ell extends to the right of the main block, with a barn attached to the northeast corner of the ell. A second barn stands across Choate Road. The interior has a fairly typical center-chimney plan, with a narrow entry vestibule leading to a parlor on the left and the original kitchen on the right. The parlor fireplace surround is of particularly fine Federal period woodwork. At the back of the house are three small rooms, and a stair leading to a partially-finished attic level.

Rev. Ebenezer Knowlton, Sr., was a native of Pittsfield, New Hampshire, who settled in Montville, the home of his wife's family, in 1827. This house is generally given a construction date of 1827–28, but there is some architectural evidence that it was built in stages, which may have begun earlier, as there are records that Knowlton, an itinerant minister, passed through the area as early as 1812. Knowlton's son, also named Ebenezer, was thirteen in 1827, and followed his father into the ministry. He also served one term in the Maine State Legislature, but is most notable as a trustee of Bates College, and Colby College. The younger Ebenezer sold the house to his brother John about 1855; the house remained in the family until 1895.

== See also ==
- National Register of Historic Places listings in Waldo County, Maine
