= Maine Wildlife Management Areas =

Protected areas in Maine, United States

Maine Wildlife Management Areas (WMAs) are state owned lands managed by the Maine Department of Inland Fisheries and Wildlife. The WMAs comprise approximately 100,000 acres and contain a diverse array of habitats, from wetland flowages critical to waterfowl production to the spruce-fir forests of northern Maine on which Canada Lynx, moose and wintering deer are dependent. Spread geographically throughout all counties of the State the properties are available for a multitude of recreational opportunities, with a focus on hunting, fishing and trapping. The focus on offering these types of recreational opportunities is in line with the funding used to acquire such properties, historically accomplished with funding from Federal Aid to Wildlife Restoration and State bonding approved by voters.

== List of Maine Wildlife Management Areas (WMAs) ==
- Alonzo H. Garcelon WMA
- Cambridge WMA
- Caesar Pond WMA
- Ducktrap River WMA
- Erle R. Kelley (Dresden Bog) WMA
- Gawler WMA
- Gene Letourneau (Frye Mountain) WMA
- Howard L. Mendall (Marsh stream) WMA
- Hurds Pond WMA
- James Dorso (Ruffingham Meadow) WMA
- Jamies (Jimmie) Pond WMA
- Madawaska Bog WMA
- Martin Stream WMA
- Merrymeeting Bay WMA
- Plymouth Bog WMA
- R. Waldo Tyler (Weskeag Marsh) WMA
- Sherman Lake WMA
- St. Albans WMA
- Sandy Point (Stowers Meadow) WMA
- Steve Powell (Swan Island) WMA
- Tolla Wolla WMA
- Tyler Pond WMA

== See also ==
- Maine State Parks
- National Wildlife Refuge
- Wildlife Management Area
