= Drexel Estate =

Historic house in Maine, United States

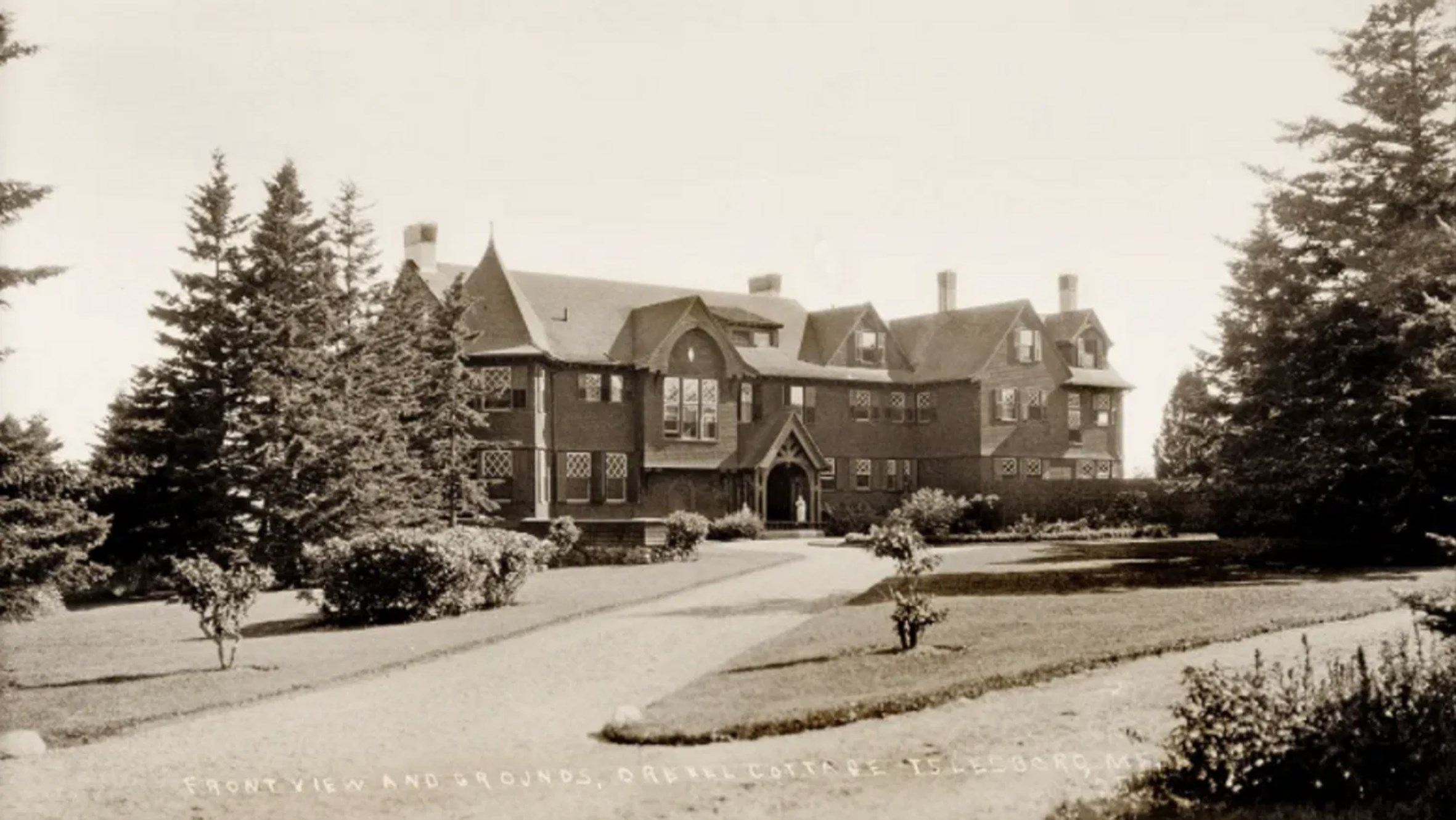
- Interactive map of the Drexel Estate area
- Alternative names: Gripsholm Manor

General information
- Architectural style: Tudor Revival architecture
- Location: The Bluff, Islesboro, Maine, Islesboro, Maine, United States
- Year built: 1903; 123 years ago

Design and construction
- Architect: Peabody and Stearns
- Drexel Estate
- U.S. National Register of Historic Places
- Location within Maine Location within the United States
- Coordinates: 44°20′37″N 68°52′50″W
- Area: 1 acre (0.40 ha)
- Architect: Peabody and Stearns
- NRHP reference No.: 85000613
- Added to NRHP: March 21, 1985

The Drexel Estate, also known as Gripsholm Manor, is a historic summer estate on Islesboro, Maine. Built in 1903 and located on The Bluffs, a point on the east shore of the island community, it is an excellent example of medieval Tudor Revival architecture. It was built for George W. Drexel, son of banker Anthony J. Drexel and a regional innovator in the design and engineering of high-speed power boats. His estate was listed on the National Register of Historic Places in 1985.

== Description and history ==
The town of Islesboro occupies an eponymous island in Maine's Penobscot Bay that has two lobes divided by a narrow neck. On the eastern side of the northern lobe projects an anvil-shaped peninsula, whose southern tip, known as The Bluffs, marks the northern side of Ryder Cove. Set in the interior of this peninsula is Gripsholm Manor, a sprawling Tudor Revival mansion. It is 2 1/2 stories in height, with wood framing and an exterior finished in wooden shingles. Its massing is asymmetrical, and has a variety of projecting sections and dormers that lend variety to its appearance. Notable is a projecting square corner section topped by a pyramidal roof. The main entrance portico has a gabled roof with half-timbering in the gable. The ocean-facing east side has two large shingle-walled porches. The interior is comparatively stark in appearance, with a relatively plain central staircase and a large rustic fireplace in its northern parlor. The building has a large number of bathrooms, most with period fixtures.

The house was designed by the architectural firm Peabody and Stearns, and was completed in 1903 for George William Childs Drexel, one of the sons of Philadelphia banker and financier Anthony J. Drexel. It is one of only 22 known commissions by the firm in Maine. Drexel was a longtime summer resident, especially noted for the high-speed power boats in which he motored around the bay. Despite his wealthy upbringing, Drexel was deeply involved in the mechanics of gasoline-powered boat engines.

== See also ==
- National Register of Historic Places listings in Waldo County, Maine
