= George S. Tiffany Cottage =

Historic house in Maine, United States

- U.S. National Register of Historic Places
- Location within Maine Location within the United States
- Location: Aldrich Rd., Dark Harbor, Maine
- Coordinates: 44°14′57″N 68°55′22″W
- Area: 3 acres (1.2 ha)
- Built: 1911
- Built by: Hatch & Pendleton
- Architect: Mauran, Russell & Crowell
- Architectural style: Prairie School
- NRHP reference No.: 89001700
- Added to NRHP: October 16, 1989

The George S. Tiffany Cottage is a historic summer house on Aldrich Road in Islesboro, Maine. Built 1911-12 for a businessman from St. Louis, Missouri, it is a rare example in the state of the Prairie School of architecture. It was listed on the National Register of Historic Places in 1989.

== Description and history ==
The town of Islesboro occupies an eponymous island in Penobscot Bay, on the central Maine coast. The island is roughly shaped as two lobes joined by a narrow isthmus. A peninsula extends south from the southern lobe, ending at Pendleton Point, the southernmost tip of the island. Roughly midway on this peninsula, a smaller one named Shattuck Point juts west. The Tiffany Cottage is set on a waterfront lot on the southwest side of the Shattuck Point peninsula, accessed via Aldrich Road. It is a large two story V-shaped structure, with a hip roof and shingled exterior. At the point of the V, a bracketed gabled section projects toward the water, flanked by single-story entry porches. Windows are arrayed somewhat irregularly, with an emphasis on horizontal lines. One end of the building has a two-level porch under the roof, supported by Colonial Revival groups of posts. The interior of the house is predominantly Colonial Revival, with paneled wainscoting and a pilastered central hall.

The house was built in 1911-12 for George S. Tiffany, a businessman in the cotton industry from St. Louis, Missouri. Tiffany's father had been an early purchaser (1891) of land developed in the area by the Islesboro Land and Improvement Company, which promoted the community as a summer resort area. His father's house burned in 1910. This house was designed by the St. Louis firm of Mauran, Russell & Crowell, and represents a melding of the distinctive styles of the Colonial Revival as well as the Prairie School.

== See also ==
- National Register of Historic Places listings in Waldo County, Maine
