= Hezekiah Chase House =

Historic house in Maine, United States

- U.S. National Register of Historic Places
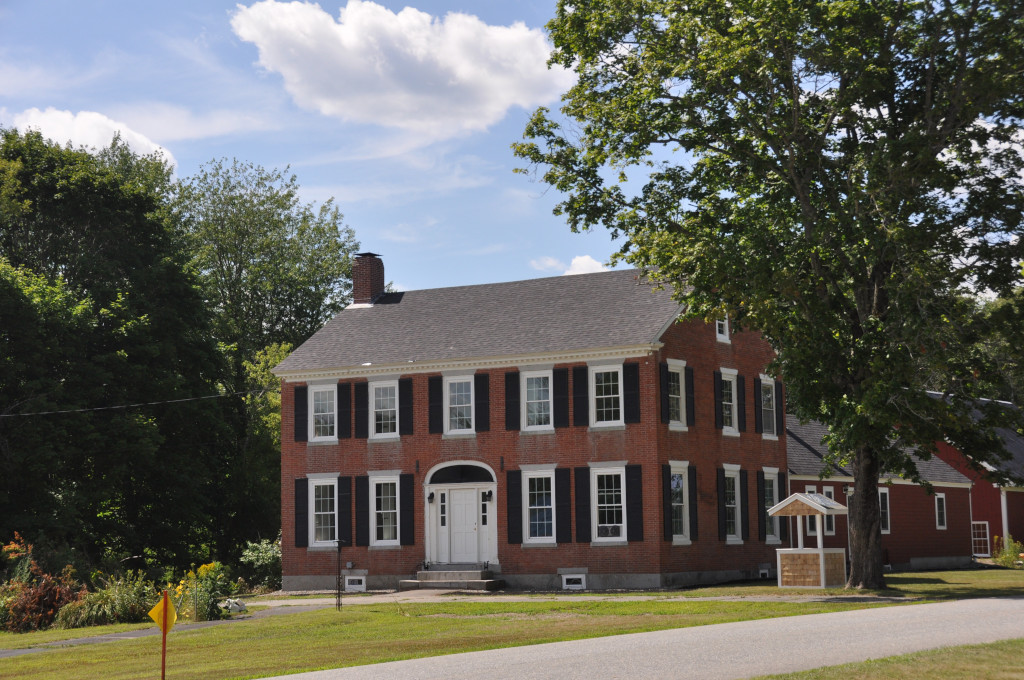

- Location within Maine Location within the United States
- Location: U.S. 202, Unity, Maine
- Coordinates: 44°36′49″N 69°19′58″W
- Area: 1 acre (0.40 ha)
- Built: 1826
- Architectural style: Federal
- NRHP reference No.: 78000202
- Added to NRHP: January 31, 1978

The Hezekiah Chase House is a historic house in United States Route 202 in the center of Unity, Maine. Built in 1826, it is a high-quality example of Federal architecture executed in brick. It is also notable as the birthplace of George Colby Chase, the second president of Bates College. The house was listed on the National Register of Historic Places in 1978.

== Description and history ==
The Chase House is set at the southwest corner of US 202 and Kanokolus Road in the center of Unity. Set back from the main road, it is a 2 1/2-story brick structure, five bays wide, with a side gable roof, end chimneys, and a stone foundation. The main facade is symmetrically arranged, with a center entrance flanked by sidelight windows and topped by a fanlight window. A 1 1/2-story wood-frame ell extends to the rear, and there is a barn near the rear of the property that was once connected to the house via a shed.

The property on which the house stands was settled by Stephen Chase in 1782. He built a Cape style house about 1810 which forms the ell of the present house, which was built by his son Hezekiah, a judge and state senator, in 1826. Hezekiah's son George (1844-1919) was born and raised here. He attended Bates College in its second class, and eventually became a professor of English there. In 1894 he became the second president of Bates, succeeding Oren Cheney and overseeing a major period of its growth.

== See also ==
- National Register of Historic Places listings in Waldo County, Maine
