= Philler Cottage =

Historic house in Maine, United States

- U.S. National Register of Historic Places
- Location within Maine Location within the United States
- Location: Jetty Rd. & Pendleton Point Rd., Dark Harbor, Islesboro, Maine
- Coordinates: 44°15′31″N 68°54′45″W
- Area: 0.5 acres (0.20 ha)
- Built: 1894
- Architect: Fred Savage
- Architectural style: Colonial Revival, Georgian Revival
- NRHP reference No.: 85000726
- Added to NRHP: April 11, 1985

The Philler Cottage, previously the Dark Harbor House Inn, is a historic house at Pendleton Point and Jetty Roads in Islesboro, Maine. Built in 1894 for a wealthy Philadelphia banker, it is a high-quality regional example of a Georgian Revival summer house. It was listed on the National Register of Historic Places in 1985.

== Description and history ==
The town of Islesboro occupies an eponymous island in Penobscot Bay, on the central Maine coast. The island is roughly shaped as two lobes joined by a narrow isthmus. The Philler Cottage is located close to the village of Dark Harbor, at the northern end of a peninsula that juts south from the southern lobe of the island. It is set on a roughly triangular property bounded on the north by Pendleton Point Road (the main north–south road on that part of the island) and on the south by Jetty Road. The house is a 2 1/2-story wood-frame structure, with a hip roof, clapboard siding, and a two-story servants wing extending to one side. The roof is pierced by two brick chimneys and several dormers with gable roofs, and is topped by a widow's walk railing. The long sides of the house each have an entrance sheltered by a porch with Tuscan columns, and an upper-level balustrade with posts topped by urns. A two-story porch, also supported by Tuscan columns, adorns the west side.

The house was built in 1894–96 to a design by architect Fred Savage of Bar Harbor, Maine, for George Philler, a wealthy banker from Philadelphia. Philler was one of a number of Philadelphia businessmen who organized an exclusive resort development in the Dark Harbor area, which was anchored by the now-lost Islesboro Inn. The house had served as the Dark Harbor House Inn, which is now closed.

== See also ==
- National Register of Historic Places listings in Waldo County, Maine
