= George Ulmer House =

Historic house in Maine, United States

- U.S. National Register of Historic Places
- Location within Maine Location within the United States
- Location: 3 S. Cobbtown Rd., Lincolnville, Maine
- Coordinates: 44°17′55″N 69°0′14″W
- Area: 5.1 acres (2.1 ha)
- Built: 1799
- Architectural style: Federal
- NRHP reference No.: 06000922
- Added to NRHP: October 4, 2006

The George Ulmer House is a historic house at 3 South Cobbtown Road in Lincolnville, Maine. Built in 1799, it was the largest and most elaborate house in the area at the time. It was built for George Ulmer, who oversaw the rise and fall of a small business empire on the adjacent Ducktrap River between 1784 and 1812. The house was listed on the National Register of Historic Places in 2006.

== Description and history ==
The Ulmer House stands at the northeast corner of South Cobbtown Road and United States Route 1, just east of the Ducktrap River north of the village of Lincolnville. Sited on a rise above and back from US 1, it is an imposing presence, with views down the river to Penobscot Bay. It is a two-story wood-frame structure, with a five bay facade, hip roof, clapboard siding, and stone foundation. The main entrance is at the center of the south-facing facade, sheltered by a hip-roofed porch that extends across the two flanking bays. A secondary entrance is located in a projecting vestibule on the west side. The interior retains original plaster and woodwork, including a high quality central hall staircase. The interior was divided into two units for many years, resulting in some loss of historic integrity.

The house was built in 1799 for George Ulmer, who was then one of the wealthiest men in Hancock County (the area was separated to form Waldo County in 1827). Ulmer was politically well connected, serving as land agent for Henry Knox, and was able to leverage connections to financiers in Boston, Massachusetts to build a small lumber-driven empire on land he acquired from Knox at a discount in exchange for his services. Ulmer used the power he held as land agent (Knox was in the 1790s the area's largest landowner) to his own benefit, but was also seen with disfavor by the area's smaller landholders, who took offense at his and Knox's business practices. In several instances acts of vandalism against his business premises resulted in direct financial losses, and his first mansion, built in 1796, was destroyed by fire whose origin is uncertain. Ulmer's finances began to collapse when his mills were destroyed by spring flooding in 1807, with the replacement mills also destroyed the following December. Ulmer lost his house, to foreclosure in 1812.

Ulmer's house was converted into two family not long after he lost it, and remained that way until 1999, when a new owner reintegrated the two sides. It is unclear whether differences in the styling of some of the upstairs rooms are the result of changes made by later owners, or if they were left unfinished by Ulmer due to his growing financial problems.

== See also ==
- National Register of Historic Places listings in Waldo County, Maine
