= Grindle Point Light =

Lighthouse in Maine, US

Grindel Point Light
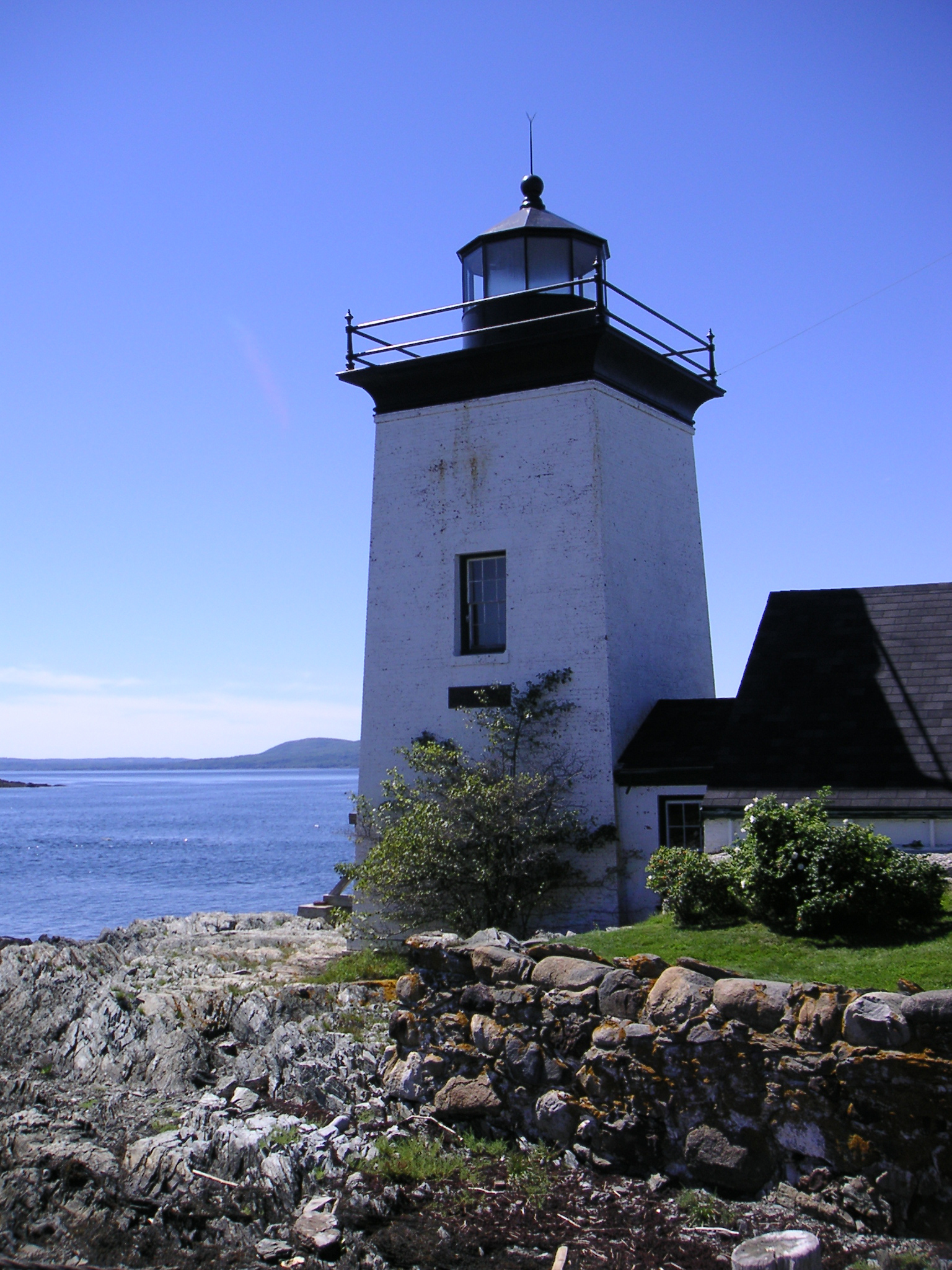
- Location: Ferry Rd., Islesboro, Maine
- Coordinates: 44°16′53.151″N 68°56′34.997″W

Tower
- Constructed: 1850
- Automated: 1934
- Height: 12 m (39 ft)
- Shape: Square Tower
- Markings: White
- Heritage: National Register of Historic Places listed place
- Fog signal: Bell originally None now

Light
- First lit: 1874 (current structure)
- Deactivated: 1934-1987
- Focal height: 39 feet (12 m)
- Lens: 5th order Fresnel lens (original), 9.8 inches (250 mm) (current)
- Range: 4 nautical miles (7.4 km; 4.6 mi)
- Characteristic: Fl G 4s
- Grindel Point Light Station
- U.S. National Register of Historic Places
- Built: 1874
- NRHP reference No.: 87000427
- Added to NRHP: March 13, 1987

Grindel Point Light is a lighthouse in Islesboro, Maine, marking the west entrance to Gilkey Harbor at the westernmost point of the eponymous island. The light station was established in 1850, and the present tower and keeper's house were built in 1874. The station was deactivated in 1934 and reactivated in 1987. It was listed on the National Register of Historic Places in 1987. The keeper's house now houses the Grindel Point Sailor's Museum and the lighthouse tower is open for tours in the summer.

== Description and history ==
The town of Islesboro occupies an eponymous island in Penobscot Bay, on the central Maine coast. The island is roughly shaped as two lobes joined by a narrow isthmus. The westernmost point of the island, called Grindle's (or "Grindle's") Point, is located at the southern tip of a peninsula extending southwest from the southern lobe. The light stands to the west of Ferry Road, near the wharf serving the ferry connecting Islesboro to the mainland at Lincolnville. The lighthouse is a short tapered square brick structure, topped by a lantern house surrounded by a metal deck with rounded railing. A covered passageway, slightly below ground level, connects the tower to the keeper's house, a rectangular wood-frame structure with a gable roof. Just northwest of the house stands a wooden boathouse, and a small brick oilhouse stands further north.

The light station was authorized by the United States Navy in 1849, and the first tower and keeper's house were completed the following year. These brick structures were deemed beyond repair in 1874, and the present station was built on the foundations of the old one. The title name is the official USCG name and is derived from the name of the second lightkeeper, Francis Grindle. The USCG History site calls it "Grindle Point". The United States Coast Guard planned to automate the light as early as 1923. After public resistance delayed this, the Coast Guard in 1934 mounted a new light on a steel tower nearby in 1934. The town of Islesboro bought the light for $1,200 and established the Sailors' Memorial Museum there. After considerable public pressure, the Coast Guard reestablished the light in 1987.

== See also ==
- National Register of Historic Places listings in Waldo County, Maine
