= James G. Pendleton House =

Historic house in Maine, United States

- U.S. National Register of Historic Places
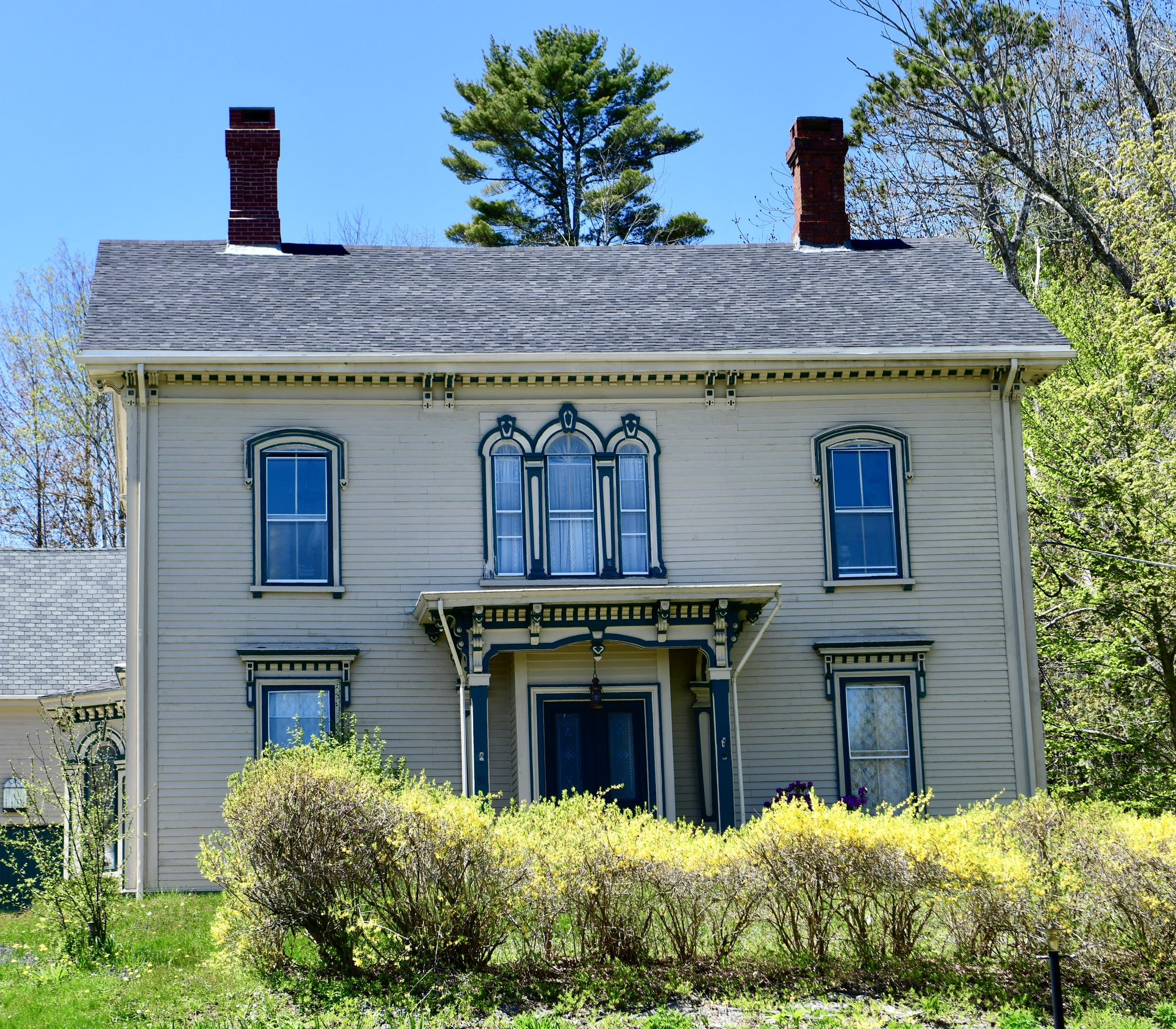

- Location within Maine Location within the United States
- Location: 81 W. Main St., Searsport, Maine
- Coordinates: 44°27′10″N 68°55′59″W
- Area: 3.1 acres (1.3 ha)
- Built: 1865
- Architectural style: Italianate
- NRHP reference No.: 95000218
- Added to NRHP: March 10, 1995

The James G. Pendleton House is a historic house at 81 West Main Street in Searsport, Maine. Built about 1865, this modestly styled Italianate house belonged to James G. Pendleton, a prominent local ship's captain, businessman, and politician. It was listed on the National Register of Historic Places in 1995.

== Description and history ==
The Pendleton House is located south of downtown Searsport, set back from the west side of Main Street (United States Route 1) on a terrace with a view of Penobscot Bay. The house is two stories in height, with a side gable roof and clapboard siding. Telescoping ells to the rear join the main house to a carriage barn. The main facade is symmetrically arranged, with a center entrance sheltered by an ornate flat-roof porch supported by paneled and bracketed columns. The first floor windows have dentillated and bracketed hoods, while the second floor outer windows are set in segmented-arch openings with simpler hoods. The center window, set above the entrance, has three rounded-arch sections with keystones. The main cornice is dentillated and adorned with paired brackets. The interior of the house retains original Italianate woodwork, including a particularly fine main staircase.

The house was built about 1865 for James G. Pendleton; its architect is not known. Pendleton began his career as a successful ship's captain, and was by 1870 involved in banking and other business in Searsport, along with continuing to own interests in ships. He also served for two years (1879–81) on the Maine Governor's Council.

== See also ==
- National Register of Historic Places listings in Waldo County, Maine
