= James Dorso Wildlife Management Area =

Protected area in Maine, United States

Coordinates: 44.41°N 69.24°W

The James Dorso Wildlife Management Area, or Ruffingham Meadow, is a 674-acre (273 ha) Wildlife Management Area in the U.S. state of Maine, located in Searsmont and Montville and formed in the 1950s by damming Bartlett Stream near Maine State Route 3 to flood an old existing basin.

In the late-1960s, a Maine Department of Inland Fisheries and Wildlife technician, James Dorso, pioneered the use of nesting boxes in Maine to bolster and stabilize populations of wood ducks and other waterfowl species.
