= Gene Letourneau (Frye Mountain) WMA =

Protected area in Maine, United States

- Location within Maine
- Location: Montville, Knox, Waldo, Maine, United States
- Coordinates: 44°28′34″N 69°13′1″W
- Area: 5,241 acres (21.21 km^{2})
- Elevation: 1,139 ft (347 m)
- Established: 1985
- Operator: Maine Department of Inland Fisheries and Wildlife

Gene Letourneau (Frye Mountain) Wildlife Management Area is a 5241-acre (2120.96 ha) Maine Wildlife Management Area (WMA) operated and managed by the Department of Inland Fisheries and Wildlife (IFW) located in the towns of Montville, Knox and part of Morrill in Waldo County, ME about 12 miles west of Belfast. Frye Mountain is a managed forested area with second-growth spruce and white pine.

== History ==
Frye Mountain was originally home to farming families, but in the late 1930s, the United States government obtained much of the land on and around Frye Mountain through the Bankhead Jones Farm Tenant Act. Proposed in 1937, the act was amended several times before passage, but ultimately “offered low interest loans, with stipulations on maintenance and proper farming practices, hopefully to encourage families to work on improving what might eventually be their own property,” according to a history prepared by the Montville Historical Society.

Even prior to purchase of property in Montville, some work was being done by the government in anticipation of its becoming part of Lake St. George State Park. According to a May 1936 article in The Republican Journal, there were several options being considered for the less than 1,000-acre area. At the time it seemed most likely to become a recreational area, including camping, swimming and picnic areas, as well as hiking trails.

“The idea one gets is that it will be somewhat similar to the Belfast City Park,” the article states.

Frye Mountain became home to a game management district instead and in 1985 was renamed Gene Letourneau Wildlife Management Area, after a longtime outdoor sportswriter from Waterville. The name change was protested with a petition signed by 400 who believed the name change was disrespectful to the original families who lived on Frye Mountain. Most of the Frye Mountain homes are completely gone, with only a marker noting the presence of a structure. Some still wonder what was said to homeowners by government representatives regarding purchase of their property, based on stories of a few holdouts, as well as tales of homes burned and torn down. Also gone is a fire tower that sat atop Frye Mountain — it was moved to Swan Island in the Kennebec River in 2002 — that was staffed between 1931 and 1991 with people trained to spot forest fires.

Another use of Frye Mountain is by the Maine Army National Guard (MEARNG) which began in 1968 through a land use agreement between the MEARNG and Maine Department of Inland Fisheries and Wildlife (MDIFW). In 1973, they signed an agreement with the IFW to develop a combination rifle-pistol firing range, which was in use until 1983. In 2003, lead removal activities were conducted at the firing range. Currently, the land use agreement for Frye Mountain has expired and has not been renewed.
