= Mount Waldo =

Mountain in Frankfort, Maine, U.S.

- Location within Maine

Highest point
- Elevation: 1,060 ft (320 m) NAVD 88
- Prominence: 840 ft (260 m)
- Coordinates: 44°34′50″N 68°53′48″W

Geography
- Location: Frankfort, Waldo County, Maine, U.S.

Climbing
- Easiest route: Hiking, class 1

Mount Waldo is a small mountain about 1,060 feet (320 m) high in Waldo County, Maine. It is located in the town of Frankfort.

Mt. Waldo granite was once the stock in trade of a thriving industry. The Mount Waldo Granite has a coarse-grained texture which gives it a more patchy, mottled look than the finer-grained granites. Although granite is no longer quarried here, it can still be seen in buildings in many eastern cities, such as New York, Washington, D.C., and Philadelphia.

The combination of bare rock ledges and proximity to tidewater made this granite amenable to quarrying in the early 19th century. The two significant quarries in the Mount Waldo Granite in the 19th century were on the northeast flank of Mount Waldo itself, and near the top of Mosquito Mountain. According to a description of the operations from the early 20th century, the quarried stone was taken over graded tracks, operated by gravity, to cutting sheds and wharfs on Marsh River. From there it was taken on the Penobscot River and distributed to eastern ports in Massachusetts, New York, and Philadelphia, and to "western" cities of Chicago, Milwaukee, and Cleveland. The granite from Mt. Waldo was used for structures such as the Washington Monument, the U.S. Senate Office Building, the Tomb of the Unknown Soldier, the United Nations Building, the Philadelphia Mint, the Empire State Building, and several piers that support the Brooklyn Bridge

The quarry was on the north spur of Mount Waldo, 660 feet (200 m) above sea level, one-third mile southwest of the village of Frankfort. The operator of the quarry was the Mount Waldo Granite Works of Frankfort. Granite from the quarry was reportedly a medium gray color. Transport of the granite was by two graded tracks, each 1,200 feet (370 m) long, operated by gravity from the quarry part way down the hill to the power house, thence by a cable road (Roebling engine) 1¼ miles to the wharf, which is accessible to schooners at 15 feet (4.6 m) draft. The quarry located at Mt. Waldo has been unused since 1914. The surviving elements of the quarry works were listed on the National Register of Historic Places in 1974.

== See also ==
- National Register of Historic Places listings in Waldo County, Maine
