= Montville, Maine =

Town in Maine, United States

- Town
- Motto: "The Way Life Is"
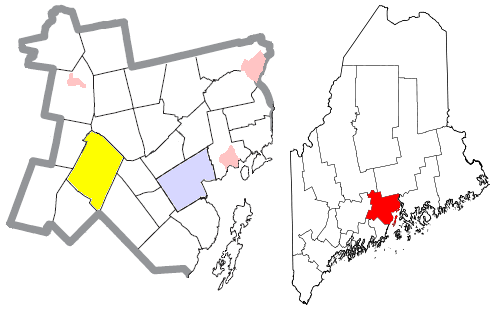
- Location of Montville (in yellow) in Waldo County and the state of Maine
- Coordinates: 44°26′54″N 69°15′36″W
- Country: United States
- State: Maine
- County: Waldo

Area
  - Total: 43.14 sq mi (111.73 km^{2})
  - Land: 42.66 sq mi (110.49 km^{2})
  - Water: 0.48 sq mi (1.24 km^{2})
- Elevation: 512 ft (156 m)

Population (2020)
  - Total: 1,020
  - Density: 24/sq mi (9.2/km^{2})
- Time zone: UTC-5 (Eastern (EST))
  - Summer (DST): UTC-4 (EDT)
- ZIP code: 04941
- Area code: 207
- FIPS code: 23-46790
- GNIS feature ID: 582605
- Website: www.montvillemaine.org

Montville is a town in Waldo County, Maine, United States. The population was 1,020 at the 2020 census.

== History ==
The area that is now the town of Montville was originally inhabited by the Wawenoec Indians.

Between 1629 and 1631 The Council of New England divided Maine into three major regions, and the region that now contains Montville was purchased by the brigadier general Samuel Waldo, for whom Waldo County is now named. The first evidence of European activity in Montville itself comes from about 1720, when timber was harvested in the area. Among the trees cut were white pines, which were used as ship masts by the British Royal Navy. The first permanent settlement by Europeans in Montville occurred in 1780, when James Davis moved to the area from Massachusetts. The settlement he founded was named the Davistown Plantation, after James Davis, and grew to encompass all of modern day Montville & Liberty. By 1790 there were six families living on the Davistown Plantation, by 1800 that number had grown to 50 families. Davistown was incorporated on February 18, 1807, under the name Montville, the French word for "mountain town". Twenty years later the southern part of Montville split off, and was incorporated as the town of Liberty.

The patent originally claimed by Samuel Waldo later came under the ownership of Henry Knox, George Washington's secretary of war. In the late 18th and early 19th century, there was an ongoing dispute between the settlers of the region and Knox over who held rightful ownership of the land. This was part of a larger conflict between the poor settlers of Mid Coast Maine and the proprietors who owned the land. The settlers believed that ownership of land meant that you had "improved" it by clearing it of trees, planting crops or building fences. Conversely, the proprietors believed that ownership of land was decided by government-granted deeds. The proprietors attempted to divide the land they claimed into lots so that they could tax the settlers there, but the settlers resisted this and banded together to stop surveying in their settlements. The homesteaders called themselves Liberty Men (likely where the town Liberty's name comes from), and used mainly intimidation tactics to scare off surveyors who entered into their dominion. On September 5, 1815, a group of Liberty men attacked the Marshall Springs hotel in Montville, in a raid against Joseph H. Pierce Jr, an agent for the twenty associates. The twenty associates were the group that took over Henry Knox's land claims after he died in 1806.

Through the first four decades of the 19th century, Montville's population rapidly increased. The land was largely deforested, and many farms were started in the area. Sawmills in Montville and Liberty processed wood, which was then transported to the coast to be used in shipbuilding. Montville and Liberty also became a center of coopering, (barrel making) with many of the barrels produced there either being used by fishermen to store their catch, or as lime casts by brick masons in cites to the south, such as Portland, Maine, or Boston, Massachusetts.

Montville reached its peak population in 1840, at which time there were 2,153 people living in the area. After this Montville's population went into a steady decline for the next 120 years, reaching its low in 1960 with just 366 people. Its population has since rebounded somewhat, and as of the 2020 census sits at 1,020 people. The drastic decrease in population meant that former farmland was allowed to re-wild, and today the vast majority of Montville's land is forested.

== Geography ==
According to the United States Census Bureau, the town has a total area of 43.14 square miles (111.73 km^{2}), of which 42.66 square miles (110.49 km^{2}) is land and 0.48 square miles (1.24 km^{2}) is water. Principle bodies of water are Trues Pond (173 acres), Kingdom Bog (90 acres), Ledge Pond (24 acres) and Mud Pond (15 acres). The town is crossed by state routes SR 220 and SR 3. It borders the towns of Knox to the northeast, Morrill to the east, Searsmont to the southeast, Liberty to the southwest, Palermo to the west and Freedom to the northwest. The Town Office is located on 414 Center Road.

Montville is home to part of Frye Mountain Wildlife Management Area. It is also home to part of James Dorso (Ruffingham Meadow) WMA.

== Demographics ==
Historical population
Census	Pop.	Note	%±
1810	864		—
1820	1,266		46.5%
1830	1,743		37.7%
1840	2,153		23.5%
1850	1,881		−12.6%
1860	1,682		−10.6%
1870	1,467		−12.8%
1880	1,255		−14.5%
1890	1,049		−16.4%
1900	982		−6.4%
1910	850		−13.4%
1920	743		−12.6%
1930	664		−10.6%
1940	605		−8.9%
1950	466		−23.0%
1960	366		−21.5%
1970	430		17.5%
1980	631		46.7%
1990	877		39.0%
2000	1,002		14.3%
2010	1,032		3.0%
2020	1,020		−1.2%
U.S. Decennial Census

=== 2010 census ===
As of the census of 2010, there were 1,032 people, 433 households, and 294 families living in the town. The population density was 24.2 inhabitants per square mile (9.3/km^{2}). There were 553 housing units at an average density of 13.0 per square mile (5.0/km^{2}). The racial makeup of the town was 96.1% White, 0.4% African American, 0.1% Native American, 0.4% Asian, 0.7% from other races, and 2.3% from two or more races. Hispanic or Latino of any race were 2.2% of the population.

There were 433 households, of which 32.1% had children under the age of 18 living with them, 55.0% were married couples living together, 6.9% had a female householder with no husband present, 6.0% had a male householder with no wife present, and 32.1% were non-families. 25.6% of all households were made up of individuals, and 8.3% had someone living alone who was 65 years of age or older. The average household size was 2.38 and the average family size was 2.83.

The median age in the town was 43.6 years. 22.4% of residents were under the age of 18; 4.9% were between the ages of 18 and 24; 25.1% were from 25 to 44; 32.8% were from 45 to 64; and 14.8% were 65 years of age or older. The gender makeup of the town was 49.7% male and 50.3% female.

=== 2000 census ===
As of the census of 2000, there were 1,002 people, 391 households, and 279 families living in the town. The population density was 23.5 people per square mile (9.1 people/km^{2}). There were 483 housing units at an average density of 11.3 per square mile (4.4/km^{2}). The racial makeup of the town was 98.00% White, 0.10% African American, 0.10% Native American, 0.10% Asian, 0.90% from other races, and 0.80% from two or more races. Hispanic or Latino of any race were 1.00% of the population.

There were 391 households, out of which 35.8% had children under the age of 18 living with them, 59.1% were married couples living together, 5.9% had a female householder with no husband present, and 28.4% were non-families. 21.0% of all households were made up of individuals, and 6.9% had someone living alone who was 65 years of age or older. The average household size was 2.56 and the average family size was 3.00.

In the town, the population was spread out, with 26.4% under the age of 18, 6.7% from 18 to 24, 29.7% from 25 to 44, 27.3% from 45 to 64, and 9.8% who were 65 years of age or older. The median age was 37 years. For every 100 females, there were 102.4 males. For every 100 females age 18 and over, there were 100.3 males.

The median income for a household in the town was $32,434, and the median income for a family was $37,917. Males had a median income of $25,391 versus $23,583 for females. The per capita income for the town was $14,112. About 9.9% of families and 14.5% of the population were below the poverty line, including 18.0% of those under age 18 and 12.2% of those age 65 or over.

== Historic Sites in Montville ==
- Ebenezer Knowlton House

== Notable people ==
- Ebenezer Knowlton, U.S. Representative, minister, and co-founder of Bates College
- Carol Weston, state legislator
- Stanley Zeigler, state legislator
