= Frankfort, Maine =

Town in Maine, United States

- Town
- Seal

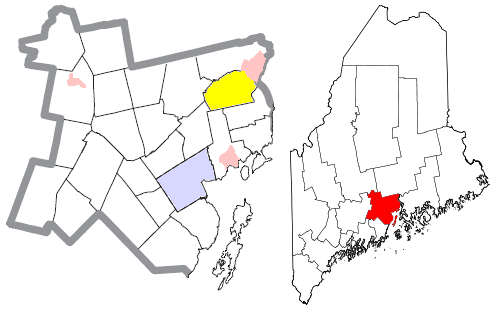
- Location of Frankfort (in yellow) in Waldo County and the state of Maine
- Coordinates: 44°36′44″N 68°54′12″W
- Country: United States
- State: Maine
- County: Waldo
- Incorporated: June 25, 1789

Government
  - Type: Town Meeting-Select Board

Area
  - Total: 25.91 sq mi (67.11 km^{2})
  - Land: 24.61 sq mi (63.74 km^{2})
  - Water: 1.30 sq mi (3.37 km^{2})
- Elevation: 217 ft (66 m)

Population (2020)
  - Total: 1,231
  - Density: 50/sq mi (19.3/km^{2})
- Time zone: UTC-5 (Eastern (EST))
  - Summer (DST): UTC-4 (EDT)
- ZIP code: 04438
- Area code: 207
- FIPS code: 23-26280
- GNIS feature ID: 582478
- Website: www.frankfortme.com

Frankfort is a town on the Penobscot River estuary in Waldo County, Maine, United States. The population was 1,231 at the 2020 census.

== History ==
Frankfort is the oldest town on the Penobscot River, first settled in the 1760s by Massachusetts soldiers from nearby Fort Pownall. With the end of the French and Indian War, the Penobscot Valley became part of New England, and more specifically Massachusetts, leading to the first cautious encroachments by English-speaking settlers on the lands of the Penobscot Indians. This process, which would begin in Frankfort, would end with the founding of Bangor, Brewer, Orono, Old Town and other inland settlements, and the eventual restriction of the Penobscot people to their major village at "Indian Old Town", or the present Penobscot Indian Reservation.

Today's Frankfort is just a small portion of the original town, which contained the present-day towns of Frankfort, Winterport, Stockton Springs, and Prospect. Ft. Pownall was thus in Frankfort, and the town's major village was what is now Winterport. Frankfort was a logical place for settlement not only because Verona Island commanded the approach up the river, but because the river above the town froze during the winter, making this the last ice-free port as one ascended—hence the name "Winterport".

One of the first settlers was Lt. Joshua Treat (1729–1802), the armorer at Ft. Pownall, whose brother became one of the first settlers of Bangor.

A British fleet anchored off Frankfort in 1814 on its way to sack Bangor and Hampden. The British confiscated provisions from the town and took one ship. The town suffered greatly during the War of 1812 as the British blockade destroyed the coasting trade on which it depended.

In the 19th century an important granite quarry was opened in Frankfort, and the ship-building industry also flourished. The village of Winterport eventually split off to form its own town, however.

== Geography ==
According to the United States Census Bureau, the town has a total area of 25.91 square miles (67.11 km^{2}), of which 24.61 square miles (63.74 km^{2}) is land and 1.30 square miles (3.37 km^{2}) is water. Frankfort borders on Swan Lake on the southwest and is drained by the Marsh Stream on its northern border.

The town is crossed by U.S. Route 1A and is bordered on the north by Winterport, on the east by the Penobscot River and across the river, Bucksport, on the south by Prospect and Searsport, on the southwest by Swanville and on the west by Monroe.

Frankfort's two highest points are Mt. Waldo and Mosquito Mountain. Mt. Waldo was so named circa 1815. Prior to that time, it had been called "Mt. Misery" because two young local men who had attempted to climb it had been overtaken by a blizzard and killed.

== Demographics ==
Historical population
Census	Pop.	Note	%±
1790	891		—
1800	867		−2.7%
1810	1,493		72.2%
1820	2,129		42.6%
1830	2,487		16.8%
1840	3,603		44.9%
1850	4,233		17.5%
1860	2,143		−49.4%
1870	1,152		−46.2%
1880	1,157		0.4%
1890	1,099		−5.0%
1900	1,211		10.2%
1910	1,157		−4.5%
1920	624		−46.1%
1930	468		−25.0%
1940	562		20.1%
1950	578		2.8%
1960	692		19.7%
1970	620		−10.4%
1980	783		26.3%
1990	1,020		30.3%
2000	1,041		2.1%
2010	1,124		8.0%
2020	1,231		9.5%
U.S. Decennial Census

=== 2010 census ===
As of the census of 2010, there were 1,124 people, 452 households, and 323 families living in the town. The population density was 45.7 inhabitants per square mile (17.6/km^{2}). There were 537 housing units at an average density of 21.8 per square mile (8.4/km^{2}). The racial makeup of the town was 98.8% White, 0.3% African American, 0.1% Native American, 0.4% Asian, 0.2% from other races, and 0.3% from two or more races. Hispanic or Latino of any race were 0.4% of the population.

There were 452 households, of which 29.2% had children under the age of 18 living with them, 59.1% were married couples living together, 7.5% had a female householder with no husband present, 4.9% had a male householder with no wife present, and 28.5% were non-families. 19.7% of all households were made up of individuals, and 5.7% had someone living alone who was 65 years of age or older. The average household size was 2.49 and the average family size was 2.85.

The median age in the town was 41.6 years. 21.3% of residents were under the age of 18; 7.4% were between the ages of 18 and 24; 25.9% were from 25 to 44; 32.2% were from 45 to 64; and 13.3% were 65 years of age or older. The gender makeup of the town was 49.8% male and 50.2% female.

=== 2000 census ===
As of the census of 2000, there were 1,041 people, 400 households, and 301 families living in the town. The population density was 42.3 inhabitants per square mile (16.3/km^{2}). There were 469 housing units at an average density of 19.0 per square mile (7.3/km^{2}). The racial makeup of the town was 97.69% White, 0.10% African American, 1.15% Native American, 0.29% Asian, and 0.77% from two or more races. Hispanic or Latino of any race were 0.29% of the population.

There were 400 households, out of which 35.0% had children under the age of 18 living with them, 64.0% were married couples living together, 7.0% had a female householder with no husband present, and 24.8% were non-families. 17.5% of all households were made up of individuals, and 6.8% had someone living alone who was 65 years of age or older. The average household size was 2.60 and the average family size was 2.97.

In the town, the population was spread out, with 25.7% under the age of 18, 8.5% from 18 to 24, 32.6% from 25 to 44, 23.7% from 45 to 64, and 9.4% who were 65 years of age or older. The median age was 35 years. For every 100 females, there were 94.6 males. For every 100 females age 18 and over, there were 93.7 males.

The median income for a household in the town was $33,333, and the median income for a family was $35,924. Males had a median income of $29,342 versus $19,375 for females. The per capita income for the town was $14,524. About 13.6% of families and 13.4% of the population were below the poverty line, including 19.2% of those under age 18 and 12.5% of those age 65 or over.
