= Freedom, Maine =

Town in Maine, United States

- Town
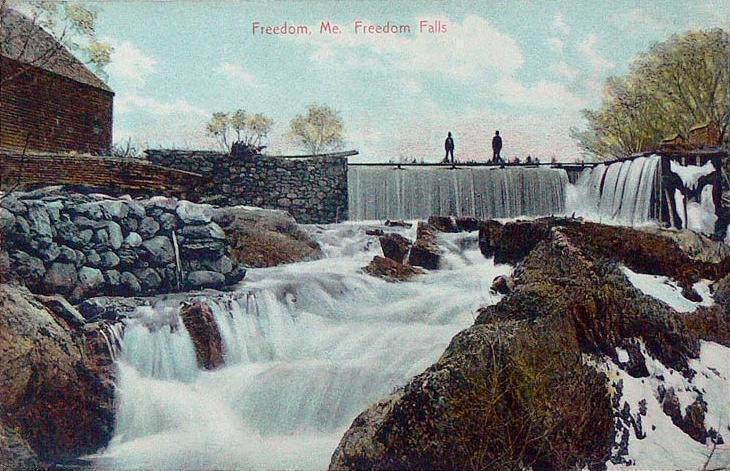
- Freedom Falls c. 1907

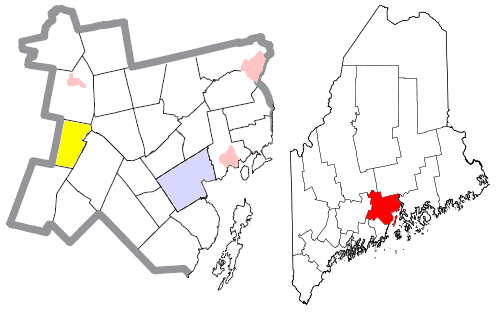
- Location of Freedom (in yellow) in Waldo County and the state of Maine
- Coordinates: 44°29′50″N 69°21′20″W
- Country: United States
- State: Maine
- County: Waldo
- Incorporated: 1813

Area
  - Total: 22.22 sq mi (57.55 km^{2})
  - Land: 21.52 sq mi (55.74 km^{2})
  - Water: 0.70 sq mi (1.81 km^{2})
- Elevation: 709 ft (216 m)

Population (2020)
  - Total: 711
  - Density: 33/sq mi (12.8/km^{2})
- Time zone: UTC-5 (Eastern (EST))
  - Summer (DST): UTC-4 (EDT)
- ZIP code: 04941
- Area code: 207
- FIPS code: 23-26420
- GNIS feature ID: 582480
- Website: www.freedomme.org

Freedom is a town in Waldo County, Maine, United States. The population was 711 at the 2020 census. Freedom is a residential and recreational area.

== History ==
The area was part of the Plymouth Patent. It was settled in 1794 by Stephen Smith, who was a soldier in the Revolutionary War. First called Smithstown Plantation, it was later called Beaver Hill Plantation. During the War of 1812, the town was incorporated on June 11, 1813, as Freedom, a name which had political significance. Freedom Academy was founded in 1836. The town's population was 716 inhabitants in 1870, and 652 in 1880.

Principal products of farms were hay and potatoes. Sandy Stream, which is supplied by Sandy and Duck ponds, provided water power for early mills. Industries included a flour mill, corn mill, sawmill for long lumber, shingle mill, a shovel handle factory, a carding, clothing and woolen mill, and a tannery.

== Geography ==
According to the United States Census Bureau, the town has a total area of 22.22 square miles (57.55 km^{2}), of which 21.52 square miles (55.74 km^{2}) is land and 0.70 square miles (1.81 km^{2}) is water, chiefly Sandy (Freedom) Pond (420 acres) . Freedom is drained by Sandy Stream.

== Demographics ==
Historical population
Census	Pop.	Note	%±
1820	788		—
1830	867		10.0%
1840	1,153		33.0%
1850	948		−17.8%
1860	849		−10.4%
1870	716		−15.7%
1880	652		−8.9%
1890	510		−21.8%
1900	479		−6.1%
1910	780		62.8%
1920	460		−41.0%
1930	422		−8.3%
1940	492		16.6%
1950	466		−5.3%
1960	406		−12.9%
1970	373		−8.1%
1980	458		22.8%
1990	593		29.5%
2000	645		8.8%
2010	719		11.5%
2020	711		−1.1%
U.S. Decennial Census

=== 2010 census ===
As of the census of 2010, there were 719 people, 292 households, and 192 families living in the town. The population density was 33.4 inhabitants per square mile (12.9/km^{2}). There were 343 housing units at an average density of 15.9 per square mile (6.1/km^{2}). The racial makeup of the town was 97.9% White, 0.3% African American, 0.3% Native American, 0.3% Asian, 0.3% from other races, and 1.0% from two or more races. Hispanic or Latino of any race were 1.3% of the population.

There were 292 households, of which 27.4% had children under the age of 18 living with them, 52.1% were married couples living together, 8.9% had a female householder with no husband present, 4.8% had a male householder with no wife present, and 34.2% were non-families. 25.3% of all households were made up of individuals, and 10.3% had someone living alone who was 65 years of age or older. The average household size was 2.46 and the average family size was 2.91.

The median age in the town was 44.7 years. 22.7% of residents were under the age of 18; 7.3% were between the ages of 18 and 24; 20.8% were from 25 to 44; 34.9% were from 45 to 64; and 14.3% were 65 years of age or older. The gender makeup of the town was 49.1% male and 50.9% female.

=== 2000 census ===
As of the census of 2000, there were 645 people, 259 households, and 182 families living in the town. The population density was 30.0 inhabitants per square mile (11.6/km^{2}). There were 321 housing units at an average density of 14.9 per square mile (5.8/km^{2}). The racial makeup of the town was 96.59% White, 0.31% African American, 0.16% Native American, and 2.95% from two or more races. Hispanic or Latino of any race were 2.17% of the population.

There were 259 households, out of which 30.9% had children under the age of 18 living with them, 57.1% were married couples living together, 7.3% had a female householder with no husband present, and 29.7% were non-families. 22.0% of all households were made up of individuals, and 7.3% had someone living alone who was 65 years of age or older. The average household size was 2.49 and the average family size was 2.84.

In the town, the population was spread out, with 24.8% under the age of 18, 5.9% from 18 to 24, 26.7% from 25 to 44, 30.9% from 45 to 64, and 11.8% who were 65 years of age or older. The median age was 42 years. For every 100 females, there were 112.9 males. For every 100 females age 18 and over, there were 106.4 males.

The median income for a household in the town was $33,125, and the median income for a family was $35,750. Males had a median income of $33,750 versus $24,688 for females. The per capita income for the town was $15,492. About 11.6% of families and 15.4% of the population were below the poverty line, including 17.5% of those under age 18 and 10.4% of those age 65 or over.

== Notable people ==
- George Willard Coy, American mechanic, inventor and telephone pioneer
- Daniel F. Davis, 37th governor of Maine
