= Searsmont, Maine =

Town in Maine, United States

- Town
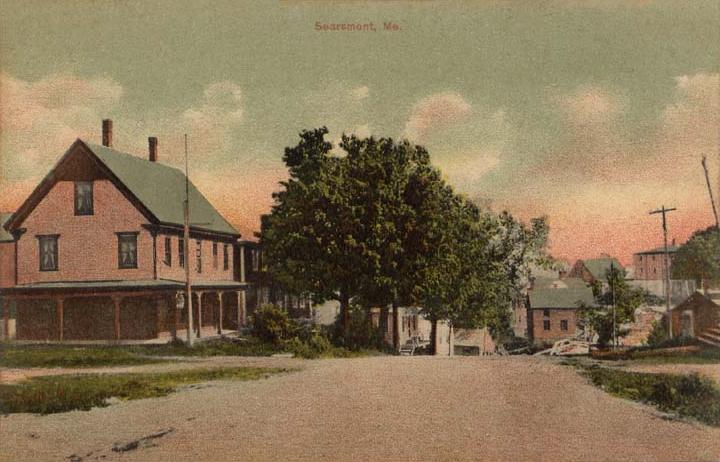
- General view in 1908

- Seal

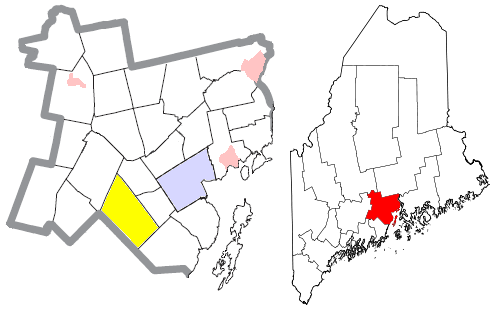
- Location of Searsmont (in yellow) in Waldo County and the state of Maine
- Coordinates: 44°21′42″N 69°11′42″W
- Country: United States
- State: Maine
- County: Waldo
- Incorporated: 1814

Area
  - Total: 39.15 sq mi (101.40 km^{2})
  - Land: 37.74 sq mi (97.75 km^{2})
  - Water: 1.41 sq mi (3.65 km^{2})
- Elevation: 210 ft (64 m)

Population (2020)
  - Total: 1,400
  - Density: 37/sq mi (14.3/km^{2})
- Time zone: UTC-5 (Eastern (EST))
  - Summer (DST): UTC-4 (EDT)
- ZIP code: 04973
- Area code: 207
- FIPS code: 23-66565
- Website: searsmont.com

Searsmont is a town in Waldo County, Maine, United States. The population was 1,400 at the 2020 census.

== History ==
Located at the junction of several well-marked Indian trails, Searsmont was originally called Quantabacook. The town was a part of the Waldo Patent purchased by a consortium of wealthy Boston investors that included David Sears. First settled in 1804 and called Fraternity Village by Ben Ames Williams, it was incorporated on February 5, 1814, as Searsmont, named after its proprietor.

The town was noted for its productive soil, water power and abundant forests of white pine. By 1859, when the population was 1,693, it had 15 sawmills and two gristmills. In 1886, it had five lumber mills; three cooperages; a sash; blind and pump factory; four carriage factories; a tannery; a boot and shoe factory; and a coffin and bedstead factory.

Today, Searsmont continues its lumbering heritage with one mill in town.

== Geography ==
According to the United States Census Bureau, the town has an area of 39.15 square miles (101.40 km^{2}), of which 37.74 square miles (97.75 km^{2}) is land and 1.41 square miles (3.65 km^{2}) is water. Adjacent to Quantabacook Lake (665 acres), Searsmont is drained by the St. George River. Other ponds include Levenseller Pond (34 acres), Lawry Pond (85 acres), Ruffingham Meadow (51 acres) and Little Pond (42 acres).

The town is served by state routes 3, 131 and 173. It is bordered on the northeast by Morrill, on the east by Belmont, on the south by Lincolnville, on the southwest by Appleton and on the northwest by Liberty and Montville.

Searsmont is home to part of the James Dorso (Ruffingham Meadow) WMA.

== Demographics ==
Historical population
Census	Pop.	Note	%±
1820	675		—
1830	1,151		70.5%
1840	1,374		19.4%
1850	1,693		23.2%
1860	1,657		−2.1%
1870	1,418		−14.4%
1880	1,330		−6.2%
1890	1,144		−14.0%
1900	949		−17.0%
1910	828		−12.8%
1920	669		−19.2%
1930	613		−8.4%
1940	542		−11.6%
1950	558		3.0%
1960	628		12.5%
1970	624		−0.6%
1980	482		−22.8%
1990	938		94.6%
2000	1,174		25.2%
2010	1,392		18.6%
2020	1,400		0.6%
U.S. Decennial Census

=== 2010 census ===
As of the census of 2010, there were 1,392 people, 577 households, and 377 families living in the town. The population density was 36.9 inhabitants per square mile (14.2/km^{2}). There were 741 housing units at an average density of 19.6 per square mile (7.6/km^{2}). The racial makeup of the town was 96.8% White, 0.5% African American, 0.6% Native American, 0.6% Asian, 0.2% from other races, and 1.4% from two or more races. Hispanic or Latino of any race were 0.3% of the population.

There were 577 households, of which 32.1% had children under the age of 18 living with them, 49.9% were married couples living together, 9.9% had a female householder with no husband present, 5.5% had a male householder with no wife present, and 34.7% were non-families. 26.9% of all households were made up of individuals, and 6.6% had someone living alone who was 65 years of age or older. The average household size was 2.41 and the average family size was 2.95.

The median age in the town was 41 years. 24.6% of residents were under the age of 18; 5.3% were between the ages of 18 and 24; 27.1% were from 25 to 44; 31.9% were from 45 to 64; and 11.1% were 65 years of age or older. The gender makeup of the town was 49.5% male and 50.5% female.

=== 2000 census ===
As of the census of 2000, there were 1,174 people, 478 households, and 319 families living in the town. The population density was 31.1 inhabitants per square mile (12.0/km^{2}). There were 617 housing units at an average density of 16.3 per square mile (6.3/km^{2}). The racial makeup of the town was 98.55% White, 0.77% Native American, 0.09% Asian, 0.09% from other races, and 0.51% from two or more races. Hispanic or Latino of any race were 0.68% of the population.

There were 478 households, out of which 29.9% had children under the age of 18 living with them, 54.8% were married couples living together, 8.2% had a female householder with no husband present, and 33.1% were non-families. 23.8% of all households were made up of individuals, and 6.5% had someone living alone who was 65 years of age or older. The average household size was 2.46 and the average family size was 2.91.

In the town, the population was spread out, with 24.9% under the age of 18, 6.1% from 18 to 24, 31.9% from 25 to 44, 26.3% from 45 to 64, and 10.7% who were 65 years of age or older. The median age was 38 years. For every 100 females, there were 100.7 males. For every 100 females age 18 and over, there were 97.8 males.

The median income for a household in the town was $36,708, and the median income for a family was $40,000. Males had a median income of $28,088 versus $24,750 for females. The per capita income for the town was $18,118. About 7.0% of families and 8.4% of the population were below the poverty line, including 3.9% of those under age 18 and 14.5% of those age 65 or over.

== Notable people ==
- Peter Broderick, musician and composer
- Edwin Denby, poet, dance critic, and novelist
- Charles West Kendall, lawyer, editor, and US congressman
