= Maine State Route 131 =

State highway in Knox and Waldo Counties, Maine, US

State Route 131

Route information
- Maintained by MaineDOT
- Length: 58.49 mi (94.13 km)

Major junctions
- South end: Drift Inn Road / Glenmere Road in St. George
- SR 73 in St. George; US 1 in Thomaston; SR 90 in Warren; SR 17 / SR 235 at Union; SR 105 in Appleton; SR 173 in Searsmont; SR 3 in Belmont; SR 137 in Waldo; Pond Road (formerly SR 203) in Waldo; SR 7 in Waldo
- North end: SR 141 in Swanville

Location
- Country: United States
- State: Maine
- Counties: Knox, Waldo

Highway system
- Maine State Highway System; Interstate; US; State; Auto trails; Lettered highways
← SR 130	→ SR 132

State Route 131 (SR 131) is a 58 1/2-mile-long (94.1 km) state route in the U.S. state of Maine. Its southern terminus is in the St. George community of Port Clyde, at a dead end near the Port Clyde Harbor. Its northern terminus is in Swanville, at the intersection with SR 141.

== Major junctions ==
County	Location	mi	km	Destinations	Notes
Knox	St. George	0.00	0.00	Dead end at Port Clyde Harbor	
Knox	St. George	8.82	14.19	SR 73 north (Seal Harbor Road) – South Thomaston, Rockland	Southern terminus of SR 73
Knox	Thomaston	14.12	22.72	US 1 north (New County Road) – Rockland	Southern end of US 1 concurrency
Knox	Thomaston	15.89	25.57	US 1 south (Atlantic Highway) – Bath	Northern end of US 1 concurrency
Knox	Warren	19.67	31.66	SR 90 (Camden Road) – Waldoboro, Rockland	
Knox	Union	26.31	42.34	SR 17 east / SR 235 north (Heald Highway) / Barrett Hill Road – Rockland	Southern end of SR 17 / SR 235 concurrencies
Knox	Union	26.97	43.40	SR 235 south (Town House Road) / Sennebec Road – Union, Waldoboro	Northern end of SR 235 concurrency
Knox	Union	27.41	44.11	SR 17 west (Heald Highway) – Augusta	Northern end of SR 17 concurrency
Knox	Appleton	30.65	49.33	SR 105 west (Burkettville Road) – Washington, Augusta	Southern end of SR 105 concurrency
Knox	Appleton	35.29	56.79	SR 105 east (Camden Road) – Hope, Camden	Northern end of SR 105 concurrency
Waldo	Searsmont	38.73	62.33	SR 173 north (Woodmans Mill Road) – Liberty	Southern end of SR 173 concurrency
Waldo	Searsmont	39.60	63.73	SR 173 south (Lincolnville Avenue) – Lincolnville	Northern end of SR 173 concurrency
Waldo	Belmont	42.85	68.96	SR 3 west (Augusta Road) – Augusta	Southern end of SR 3 concurrency
Waldo	Belmont	43.30	69.68	SR 3 east (Augusta Road) – Belfast	Northern end of SR 3 concurrency
Waldo	Waldo	49.15	79.10	SR 137 (Waterville Road) – Knox, Belfast	
Waldo	Waldo	50.71	81.61	Pond Road	Southern terminus of Pond Road, formerly SR 203
Waldo	Waldo	51.38	82.69	SR 7 (Moosehead Trail) – Brooks, Belfast	
Waldo	Swanville	58.49	94.13	SR 141 (Swan Lake Avenue) – Monroe, Swan Lake State Park	
1.000 mi = 1.609 km; 1.000 km = 0.621 mi: Concurrency terminus
