= Maine State Route 220 =

State highway in central coastal Maine, US

State Route 220

Route information
- Maintained by MaineDOT
- Length: 66.50 mi (107.02 km)
- Existed: 1929–present

Major junctions
- South end: SR 97 in Friendship
- US 1 in Waldoboro; SR 17 in Washington; SR 3 in Liberty; US 202 / SR 9 from Unity to Troy
- North end: SR 11 / SR 100 in Palmyra

Location
- Country: United States
- State: Maine
- Counties: Knox, Lincoln, Waldo, Somerset

Highway system
- Maine State Highway System; Interstate; US; State; Auto trails; Lettered highways
← SR 219	→ SR 221

State Route 220 (SR 220) is a state highway located in central coastal Maine. It begins at State Route 97 in Friendship on the Atlantic coast and runs for 66.50 miles (107.02 km) north to Palmyra, where it ends at State Route 11 and State Route 100. SR 220 runs through a series of small towns, with connecting routes leading to larger population centers such as Augusta, Waterville, and Bangor to the east and west.

== Route description ==
SR 220 begins in Friendship at SR 97 (Shipyard Road) and Harbor Road, near the southern tip of the mainland at Friendship Harbor. This intersection is also the southern terminus of SR 97. SR 220 proceeds north along the western coast until reaching the town of Waldoboro in Lincoln County, where it enters the town center before turning northeast and crossing US 1. Continuing north, SR 220 enters the town of Washington (re-entering Knox County) and intersects with SR 126 and SR 17 before reaching the center of town. In downtown Washington, SR 105 joins SR 220 and the two routes head north out of town.

The highways cross into the town of Liberty in Waldo County, where SR 105 splits off to the southeast after a 2.49-mile (4.01 km) concurrency. SR 220 continues northeast until meeting SR 173 near Saint George Lake, then turns northwest to cross SR 3 at Clark's Corner. The highway continues north through the town of Montville, crosses SR 137 in western Knox, and intersects with SR 139 in western Thorndike. SR 139 and SR 220 are cosigned for 3.52 miles (5.66 km) into the town of Unity, where SR 139 splits off just east of the town center. SR 220 intersects with US 202 / SR 9 at Unity Pond and turns north onto Bangor Road forming a three-route concurrency for 2.95 miles (4.75 km). The road enters the town of Troy and SR 220 splits off to the north, turning briefly east before returning to a northerly heading.

SR 220 enters the town of Detroit in Somerset County and has a brief 0.70-mile (1.13 km) with SR 69 in the downtown area, splitting just after crossing the East Branch Sebasticook River. SR 220 continues northwest, crosses into the town of Palmyra and immediately terminates at SR 11 / SR 100 (Hurd's Corner).

== History ==
As originally designated in 1929, SR 220 ran from US 1 in Warren southwest to Friendship, then turned north and followed its modern routing as far as SR 139 in Thorndike. In the 1930s, the route was extended to SR 9 in Unity, then again through Troy and Detroit to its modern terminus at Hurd's Corner in Palmyra, to a total length of 76 miles (122 km).

The southernmost portion of the route between Warren and Waldoboro formed a "V" shape, and was potentially confusing in that a motorist traveling north on SR 220 from Warren to Friendship was actually driving southwest, and vice versa. This was remedied in 1949 when SR 220 was truncated to Friendship at the southern tip of the "V," cutting 9.5 miles (15.3 km) from its length. The eastern leg of the "V" was redesignated as SR 97 and directional banners changed to reflect the actual direction of travel. The alignment of SR 220 has not changed since.

== Major junctions ==
County	Location	mi	km	Destinations	Notes
Knox	Friendship	0.00	0.00	SR 97 north (Shipyard Road) / Harbor Road	Southern terminus of SR 97, southern terminus of SR 220
Lincoln	Waldoboro	10.01	16.11	US 1 (Atlantic Highway) – Rockland, Bath	
Knox	Washington	18.88	30.38	SR 126 west (Jefferson Road)	Eastern terminus of SR 126
Knox	Washington	20.04	32.25	SR 17 (Rockland Road / Augusta Road) – Augusta, Rockland	
Knox	Washington	22.26	35.82	SR 105 west (Razorville Road) – Somerville	Southern terminus of SR 105 concurrency
Waldo	Liberty	25.75	41.44	SR 105 east (Burketville Road) – Appleton, Camden	Northern terminus of SR 105 concurrency
Waldo	Liberty	31.59	50.84	SR 173 south (Main Street) – Searsmont, Lincolnville	Northern terminus of SR 173
Waldo	Liberty	32.64	52.53	SR 3 (Belfast Augusta Road) – Augusta, Belfast	
Waldo	Knox	43.94	70.71	SR 137 (Belfast Road) – Freedom, Belfast	
Waldo	Thorndike	47.37	76.23	SR 139 east (Gordon Hill Road) – Brooks, Winterport	Southern terminus of SR 139 concurrency
Waldo	Unity	50.89	81.90	SR 139 west (Depot Street) / Stagecoach Road – Unity, Fairfield	Northern terminus of SR 139 concurrency
Waldo	Unity	51.34	82.62	US 202 / SR 9 south (Bangor Road) – Augusta	Southern terminus of US 202 / SR 9 concurrency
Waldo	Troy	54.29	87.37	US 202 / SR 9 north (Bangor Road) / Myrick Road – Bangor	Northern terminus of US 202 / SR 9 concurrency
Somerset	Detroit	64.97	104.56	SR 69 east (Main Street) – Plymouth	Southern terminus of SR 69 concurrency
Somerset	Detroit	65.27	105.04	SR 69 west (River Road) – Pittsfield	Northern terminus of SR 69 concurrency
Somerset	Palmyra	66.50	107.02	SR 11 / SR 100 (Oxbow Road) – Pittsfield, Newport	Northern terminus of SR 220
1.000 mi = 1.609 km; 1.000 km = 0.621 mi: Concurrency terminus
