= Tranquility Grange No. 344 =

- U.S. National Register of Historic Places
- Location within Maine Location within the United States
- Location: 1 mi. N. of jct. ME 52 and ME 173, Lincolnville Center, Maine
- Coordinates: 44°18′21″N 69°5′52″W
- Area: 1.8 acres (0.73 ha)
- Built: 1908
- Architectural style: Bungalow/Craftsman
- NRHP reference No.: 02000350
- Added to NRHP: April 11, 2002

The Tranquility Grange No. 344 is a historic Grange hall on Maine State Route 52 (Belfast Road) in Lincolnville, Maine. Built in 1908, it exhibits restrained Craftsman styling, and has been a social and civic center of the community since its construction. It was listed on the National Register of Historic Places in 2002.

== Description and history ==
The Tranquility Grange Hall stands on the south side of Maine State Route 52, about one mile northeast of Lincolnville Center. It stands on a sloping lot, presenting a single story to the street, and a fully exposed basement to the side and rear. It is topped by a hip roof with a front-facing hipped dormer, and its walls are clad in wooden shingles. The front is symmetrical, with a recessed entrance in the center and paired sash windows to either side, each grouping topped by an entablature and shallow cornice. There are narrow corner boards at the building corners, rising to a broad entablature that extends to the sides. The interior of the main floor has an entrance vestibule, cloakroom, and a small kitchen at the front, with the main hall taking up most of the rear. It has a stage at the far end, and has hardwood flooring and wainscoting, with the upper walls and ceiling finished in pressed tin. The downstairs has the dining room, a larger kitchen, and restrooms. Access to the lower level is gained by either stairs beside the stage, or via a secondary entrance on the exposed west side of the building.

The Grange hall was built in 1908, and was the third built by the organization, which was founded in 1898. The first two halls were both destroyed by fire, and this one was built on the site of the second one. The building has, since its construction, been a civic and social meeting point for the rural community, and played host to its town meetings until the 1950s.

== See also ==
- National Register of Historic Places listings in Waldo County, Maine
