= West Rockport, Maine =

- Village
- Location within Maine
- Coordinates: 44°10′55″N 69°08′07″W
- Country: United States
- State: Maine
- County: Knox
- Town: Rockport
- Elevation: 220 ft (67 m)
- Time zone: UTC-5 (Eastern (EST))
  - Summer (DST): UTC-4 (EDT)
- ZIP code: 04865
- Area code: 207
- GNIS feature ID: 578216

West Rockport is an unincorporated village in the town of Rockport, Knox County, Maine, United States. The community is located at the junction of Maine State Route 17 and Maine State Route 90, 3 miles (4.8 km) west of the Rockport town center. West Rockport has a post office with ZIP code 04865.
