= Maine State Route 52 =

State highway in Maine, US

State Route 52

Route information
- Maintained by MaineDOT
- Length: 17.42 mi (28.03 km)
- Existed: 1960–present

Major junctions
- South end: US 1 in Camden
- SR 173 / SR 235 in Lincolnville
- North end: US 1 in Belfast

Location
- Country: United States
- State: Maine
- Counties: Knox, Waldo

Highway system
- Maine State Highway System; Interstate; US; State; Auto trails; Lettered highways
← SR 46	→ SR 69

State Route 52 (abbreviated SR 52) is part of Maine's system of state highways, located in the central coast region. It runs for 17.42 miles (28.03 km) between Camden and Belfast, intersecting with U.S. Route 1 at both ends.

SR 52 forms a complete loop between Camden and Belfast, functioning as an alternate of US 1. US 1 runs along the coastline while SR 52 provides a slightly shorter, inland route between the two communities.

== Route description ==
SR 52 begins in the south in downtown Camden where it meets US 1, a few hundred yards from the southern terminus of SR 105. As it heads northward out of town, it hugs the eastern side of Megunticook Lake (with SR 105 and SR 235 opposite on the west side). SR 52 crosses into Lincolnville where it intersects with SR 173 and overlaps for about a mile. After passing the northern terminus of SR 235, SR 52 splits from SR 173 to the northeast. SR 52 enters the city of Belfast and reunites with US 1, which runs on a bypass alignment west of downtown. The roadway continues into downtown as unnumbered Lincolnville Avenue.

SR 52 is known as Mountain Street and Turnpike Drive in Camden, Camden Road, Main Street (cosigned with SR 173) and Belfast Road in Lincolnville, and Lincolnville Avenue in Belfast.

== History ==
The entirety of SR 52 was once part of SR 137 in the early 1930s, before the modern US 1 / SR 3 bypass of Belfast was built. In 1960, SR 137 was truncated to its current southern terminus to the north (a terminus it shares with SR 7) and its alignment immediately south of SR 3 was renumbered SR 52.

When originally designated, SR 52 was defined to run all the way along Lincolnville Avenue to Main Street (which, at the time, carried SR 3 into downtown Belfast where it used to intersect with US 1). By 1963, US 1 and SR 3 had been moved onto the bypass and SR 52 was cut back to end at the bypass. As a result of the routing changes for the bypass, no numbered routes exist inside of it anymore.

== Junction list ==
County	Location	mi	km	Destinations	Notes
Knox	Camden	0.0	0.0	US 1 (High Street/Main Street) to SR 105	Southern terminus of SR 52
Waldo	Lincolnville	6.1	9.8	SR 173 south (Beach Road) – Lincolnville	Southern terminus of SR 52/173 concurrency
Waldo	Lincolnville	6.8	10.9	SR 235 south (Hope Road) – Hope, Union	Northern terminus of SR 235
Waldo	Lincolnville	6.9	11.1	SR 173 north (Searsmont Road) – Searsmont, Liberty	Northern terminus of SR 52/173 concurrency
Waldo	Belfast	17.2	27.7	US 1 to SR 3 / SR 7 / SR 137 – Northport, Searsport	Northern terminus of SR 52
1.000 mi = 1.609 km; 1.000 km = 0.621 mi: Concurrency terminus
