= Maine State Route 206 =

State highway in Knox County, Maine, US

State Route 206
- West Washington Road

Route information
- Maintained by MaineDOT
- Length: 1.57 mi (2.53 km)

Major junctions
- South end: SR 17 in Washington
- North end: SR 105 in Washington

Location
- Country: United States
- State: Maine
- Counties: Knox

Highway system
- Maine State Highway System; Interstate; US; State; Auto trails; Lettered highways
| ← SR 205 | → SR 207 |

State Route 206 (SR 206) is a short state route in the U.S. state of Maine. It is located entirely in Washington and runs from SR 17 to SR 105. At 1.57 miles (2.53 km) in length, it is the shortest primary state highway in Maine.

== Route description ==
SR 206 begins at the intersection of SR 17 and Valley Road on the western side of the Town of Washington. It runs north on West Washington Road through western Washington through a mostly wooded landscape but many homes that line the road have clearings for small farming activities. The state route ends at a T-intersection with SR 105 continuing north and east from this intersection.

== Junction list ==
The entire route is in Washington, Knox County.

| mi | km | Destinations | Notes |
|---|---|---|---|
| 0.00 | 0.00 | SR 17 (Augusta Road / Rockland Road) / Valley Road – Rockland, Jefferson, Augusta | |
| 1.57 | 2.53 | SR 105 (Razorville Road / Washington Road) – Somerville, Liberty, Appleton | |
1.000 mi = 1.609 km; 1.000 km = 0.621 mi
