= Old Post Office (Liberty, Maine) =

- U.S. National Register of Historic Places
- Location within Maine Location within the United States
- Location: Main St. (SR 173), Liberty, Maine
- Coordinates: 44°23′31″N 69°18′26″W
- Built: 1870
- Architect: Carter, Rufus A.
- Architectural style: Octagon Mode
- NRHP reference No.: 73000149
- Added to NRHP: June 19, 1973

The Old Post Office, also known as the Old Octagonal Post Office, is an historic octagon-shaped former U.S. post office building located on Main Street in Liberty, Maine. The town of Liberty boasts that the building, which was built in 1870, is "the only octagonal post office in the United States". The building, which "has all its original equipment" is now the home of the Liberty Historical Society, which opens it to the public on Saturdays during the summer. On June 19, 1973, it was added to the National Register of Historic Places.

== Description and history ==
The Old Post Office is located in Liberty's village center, set close to the south side of Main Street (Maine State Route 173), two doors east of the public library. It is a small single-story eight-sided wood-frame structure, covered by a low-pitch octagonal roof and clapboard siding. It has no foundation beyond a small amount of rubblestone to provide a level surface, and is built on top of hand-sawn beams measuring 6 by 18 inches (15 cm × 46 cm) in cross section. The only entrance is in the street-facing facade, with sash windows in the other seven walls.

Rufus Carter, a local harness maker, built this building in 1870 for use as his harness shop. In 1878 it was acquired by G.H. Cargill, who was then the town postmaster, and he put it to use as the local post office. It served as the town post office in 1960, and is now maintained as a museum by the local historical society. It is believed to be the only octagonal post office building in the nation.

== See also ==
- National Register of Historic Places listings in Waldo County, Maine
- List of United States post offices
