= Maine State Route 235 =

State highway in eastern Maine, US

State Route 235

Route information
- Maintained by MaineDOT
- Length: 23.51 mi (37.84 km)
- Existed: 1957–present

Major junctions
- South end: US 1 in Waldoboro
- SR 17 / SR 131 in Union
- North end: SR 52 / SR 173 in Lincolnville

Location
- Country: United States
- State: Maine
- Counties: Lincoln, Knox, Waldo

Highway system
- Maine State Highway System; Interstate; US; State; Auto trails; Lettered highways
← SR 234	→ SR 236

State Route 235 (abbreviated SR 235) is a 23 1/2-mile-long (37.8 km) state highway located in eastern Maine, running through parts of Lincoln, Knox, and Waldo counties. Its southern terminus is at U.S. Route 1 (US 1) in Waldoboro. Its northern terminus is at SR 52 and SR 173 in Lincolnville.

SR 235 is signed as a north–south highway, but follows a zig-zagging alignment which progresses from southwest to northeast.

== Route description ==
East of downtown Waldoboro in Lincoln County, SR 235 begins at an intersection with Atlantic Highway (US 1) in an area surrounded by forest. It heads north along Union Road passing some houses along the way. Between the settlements of Benner Corner and Whitney Corner, the road enters the town of Warren in Knox County and starts to head towards the east. At an intersection with Western Road, SR 235 turns north and heads through a clearing overlooking Seven Tree Pond. It enters the town of Union and passes several farms while continuing to skirt the pond. North of the pond, Depot Street (which carries SR 235) enters the center of Union. At a stop-controlled intersection with Common Road, a post office, a general store, and a small park known as The Common surround the road. Heading north out of the downtown area, after a sharp jog in the road around a store, SR 235 comes to an intersection with Heald Highway which carries SR 17 and SR 131. The three routes join a concurrency and head east passing some businesses. After SR 131 exits the highway towards the south, SR 17 / SR 235 continue east passing a school, a hardware store, and many houses. Near the settlement of East Union, SR 235 breaks off of Heald Highway and heads north along Buzzel Hill Road.

After exiting SR 17, SR 235 heads through the center of East Union. The settlement consists of many houses and a social club. After entering the town of Hope, the road heads near the western shorelines of Lermond Pond and Alford Lake. It then climbs to the top of Gurney Hill and at an intersection with Barrett Hill Road and Gurney Hill Road, SR 235 makes a sharp bend to the northeast. The road, now named Hatchet Mountain Road, heads along rolling terrain and passes north of Alford Lake. It makes two sharp curves to pass south of Hatchet Mountain before entering the center of Hope. At the town center, it reaches an intersection with SR 105 and the two routes head southeast, concurrently, along Camden Road. Through the town center, the road passes the town hall, an orchard, and some houses. Heading further away from the town center, it enters more wooded areas. At a bend in the road known as Grants Turn, SR 235 leaves SR 105 / Camden Road to head north on Hope Road. The road enters Lincolnville, Waldo County and heads around the west and north sides of Megunticook Lake. After passing the lake, it enters the section of the town known as Lincolnville Center. It passes the town hall, a post office, and Lincolnville Central School. At its intersection with Main Street, SR 235 ends at SR 52 and SR 173.

== Major junctions ==
County	Location	mi	km	Destinations	Notes
Lincoln	Waldoboro	0.00	0.00	US 1 (Atlantic Highway) – Rockland, Waldoboro, Bath	
Knox	Union	9.38	15.10	SR 17 west / SR 131 north (Heald Highway) / Sennebec Road – Augusta	Southern end of SR 17 / SR 131 concurrencies
Knox	Union	10.04	16.16	SR 131 south (South Union Road) / Barrett Hill Road – Union, Warren	Northern end of SR 131 concurrency
Knox	Union	12.14	19.54	SR 17 east (Heald Highway) / Wotton Mill Road – Rockland	Northern end of SR 17 concurrency
Knox	Hope	19.16	30.84	SR 105 west (Camden Road) / Church Street – Appleton	Southern end of SR 105 concurrency
Knox	Hope	20.50	32.99	SR 105 east (Camden Road) – Camden	Northern end of SR 105 concurrency
Waldo	Lincolnville	23.51	37.84	SR 52 / SR 173 (Main Street) – Belfast, Searsmont, Lincolnville	
1.000 mi = 1.609 km; 1.000 km = 0.621 mi: Concurrency terminus
