= East Harpswell Free Will Baptist Church =

Historic church in Maine, United States

- U.S. National Register of Historic Places
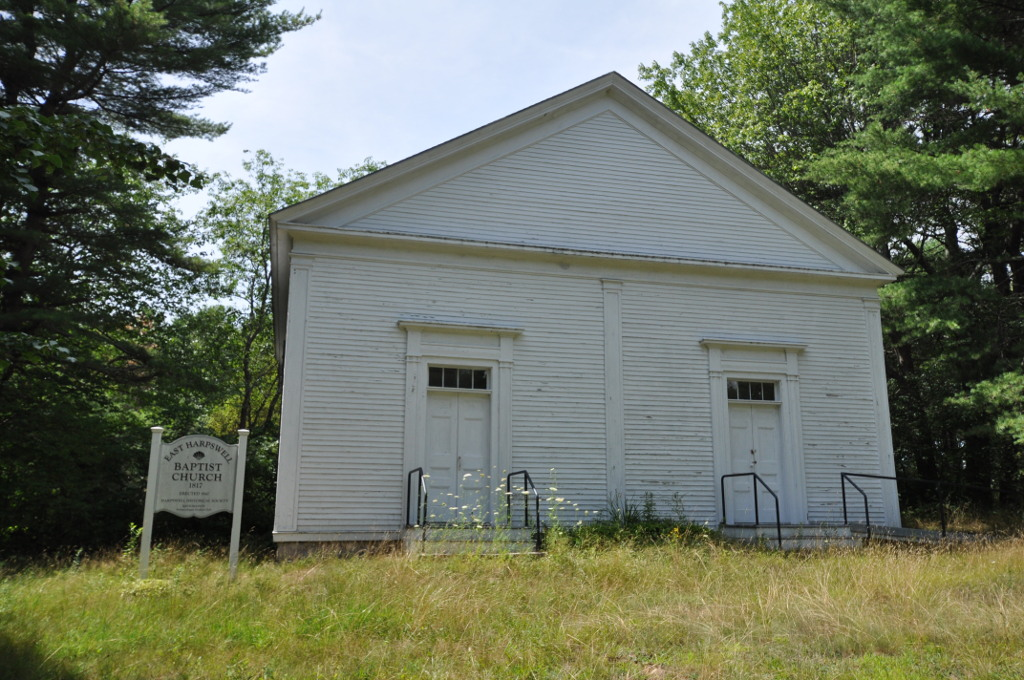

- Location within Maine Location within the United States
- Location: Cundys Harbor Rd., East Harpswell, Maine
- Coordinates: 43°50′2.7″N 69°53′56″W
- Area: less than one acre
- Built: 1843
- Architectural style: Greek Revival
- NRHP reference No.: 88000888
- Added to NRHP: June 23, 1988

The East Harpswell Free Will Baptist Church is a historic church on Cundys Harbor Road in East Harpswell, Maine. Built in 1843, it is a little-altered modest Greek Revival structure, with a reversed interior layout (with the pulpit at the entrance) that is now extremely rare within the state. It has been used only sporadically since the early 20th century, but is maintained by a local community group. The building was listed on the National Register of Historic Places in 1988.

== Description and history ==
The East Harpswell Free Will Baptist Church is located on the west side of Cundys Harbor Road, the main thoroughfare on Sebascodegan Island, which makes up the easternmost portion of the town of Harpswell. It is a simple, rectangular wood-frame structure, with a front-facing gable roof, clapboard siding, and granite foundation. Its main facade, facing east toward the road, is symmetrical, with two bays articulated by pilasters that rise to a plain frieze board, with a fully pedimented gable above. Each bay houses an entrance, flanked by pilasters and topped by a transom window and corniced entablature. The side walls each have two sash windows, and there is a single window on the back wall. The entries open into a narrow vestibule/hall space, set behind the pulpit, with interior doors that open into the main sanctuary on either side. The sanctuary has a coved plaster ceiling and three groups of original box pews, with a raised platform at the rear containing more pews.

The Free Will Baptist congregation on Sebascodegan Island was organized in 1817; where it met prior to construction of this building is not known with certainty. In 1843, the land for this building was purchased, and the building was probably built soon thereafter. The congregation's height in terms of size was between about 1840 and 1864, after which a steady decline began. By the early 20th century the congregation was moribund, and services were discontinued. There was a brief revival in the 1930s, when the building underwent some maintenance. Since the 1960s the building has been maintained by the local garden club, and is occasionally used for services and other events.

The building is one of twelve in the state that were once known to have the reverse orientation, with the pulpit set between the entrances. Most of these have either been altered to a more conventional orientation, or even demolished. The only other high-quality example of the form is the Federal period Lincolnville Center Meeting House in Lincolnville.

== See also ==
- National Register of Historic Places listings in Cumberland County, Maine
