= Maine State Route 17 =

State highway in Maine, US

State Route 17

Route information
- Maintained by MaineDOT
- Length: 131.21 mi (211.16 km)

Major junctions
- West end: SR 4 in Oquossoc
- US 2 in Mexico; US 202 / SR 11 / SR 100 in Manchester; I-95 / Maine Turnpike in Augusta; US 201 / SR 27 in Augusta
- East end: US 1 / US 1A in Rockland

Location
- Country: United States
- State: Maine
- Counties: Franklin, Oxford, Androscoggin, Kennebec, Lincoln, Knox

Highway system
- Maine State Highway System; Interstate; US; State; Auto trails; Lettered highways
← SR 16	→ SR 18

State Route 17 (abbreviated SR 17) is part of Maine's system of numbered state highways, located in the south central part of the state. It is a major regional route running for 131.21 miles (211.16 km) from an intersection with State Route 4 in Oquossoc to an intersection with U.S. Route 1 and U.S. Route 1A in Rockland.

SR 17 travels through parts of Franklin, Oxford, Androscoggin, Kennebec, Lincoln and Knox counties.

== Route description ==
SR 17 begins in Franklin County at a T-intersection with SR 4 (Carry Road) in Oquossoc village (part of Rangeley town.)

From there it heads south along the western shore of Rangeley Lake, passing South Shore Drive on the east, and continues on through Rangeley Plantation. It then enters Oxford County at Byron, and continues south through Roxbury and into Mexico where it intersects US 2.

It then runs westerly concurrent with US 2 through Mexico and Dixfield 16.79 miles (27.02 km) until it leaves US 2 near the border of Oxford County and re-enters Franklin County, where it runs westerly until it connects with SR 4 in Jay.

It then runs southerly concurrent with SR 4 through Jay and into Androscoggin County at Livermore Falls where it switches to run concurrent with SR 133 for a short way before leaving SR 133 and heading east into Kennebec County through the town of Fayette and into the town of Readfield where it concurs with SR 41 for 2.37 miles (3.81 km.)

It then leaves SR 41 and continues southeasterly into Manchester where it concurs with US 202, SR 11 and SR 100 into Augusta, passing over Interstate 95 and on into Augusta center, then concurrently with several other major routes (US 201 and US 202) over the bridge at Augusta on the Kennebec River. Once over the river it then turns south leaving all other routes except concurrent with SR 9 for a short distance before turning east and continuing into Windsor where it concurs with SR 32. It then continues southeasterly into Lincoln County at Whitefield and Jefferson where it leaves SR 32 and continues easterly through Somerville entering Knox County and intersecting first with SR 206 and then SR 220 at Washington.

Continuing easterly through Union where it concurs with SR 131 for a short distance before concurring with SR 235 for 2.78 miles (4.47 km) and then continuing on through Rockport intersecting SR 90 there. And finally on into Rockland, where it terminates at US 1 and 1A close to the waterfront port and the Atlantic Ocean.

== Junction list ==
County	Location	mi	km	Destinations	Notes
Franklin	Oquossoc	0.0	0.0	SR 4 (Carry Road) – Rangeley, Haines Landing	Western terminus of SR 17
Oxford	Mexico	35.4	57.0	US 2 west (Main Street) to SR 120 – Newry, Bethel	Western terminus of US 2 / SR 17 concurrency
Oxford	Dixfield	40.4	65.0	SR 142 north (Weld Street) – Weld, Phillips	Southern terminus of SR 142
Franklin	Wilton	52.3	84.2	US 2 east – Wilton, Farmington	Eastern terminus of US 2 / SR 17 concurrency
Oxford	No major junctions				
Franklin	Jay	55.9	90.0	SR 4 north (Main Street) – Wilton, Farmington	Northern terminus of SR 4 / SR 17 concurrency
Franklin	Jay	56.1	90.3	SR 140 south (Intervale Road) – Canton, Hartford	Northern terminus of SR 140
Androscoggin	Livermore Falls	58.7	94.5	SR 4 south (Bridge Street) – Livermore, Turner	Southern terminus of SR 4 / SR 17 concurrency
Androscoggin	Livermore Falls	59.0	95.0	SR 133 north (Pleasant Street) – Jay, Farmington	Northern terminus of SR 4 / SR 133 concurrency
Androscoggin	Livermore Falls	59.8	96.2	SR 133 south (Park Street) – Leeds, Winthrop	Southern terminus of SR 4 / SR 133 concurrency
Kennebec	Readfield	71.7	115.4	SR 41 north (Chimney Road) – Mount Vernon	Western terminus of SR 17 / SR 41 concurrency
Kennebec	Readfield	73.8	118.8	SR 41 south (Winthrop Road) – Winthrop	Western terminus of SR 17 / SR 41 concurrency
Kennebec	Readfield	77.2	124.2	SR 135 south (Stanley Road) – Monmouth	Western terminus of SR 17 / SR 135 concurrency
Kennebec	Readfield	78.1	125.7	SR 135 north (Gorden Road) – Belgrade	Eastern terminus of SR 17 / SR 135 concurrency
Kennebec	Manchester	82.3	132.4	US 202 west / SR 11 / SR 100 south (Western Avenue) – Winthrop, Lewiston	Western terminus of US 202 / SR 11 / SR 17 / SR 100 concurrency
Kennebec	Augusta	85.0	136.8	I-95 / Maine Turnpike – Lewiston, Bangor	I-95 exits 109A-B; northern terminus of Maine Turnpike
Kennebec	Augusta	86.5	139.2	US 201 south / SR 8 / SR 11 north / SR 27 (State Street) – Hallowell, Belgrade	Eastern terminus of SR 11 / SR 17 concurrency Western terminus of US 201 / US 202 / SR 17 / SR 100 concurrency
Kennebec	Augusta	87.2	140.3	US 201 north / US 202 / SR 9 east / SR 100 north / SR 105 east (Bangor / Cony Streets) – Vassalboro, China	Eastern terminus of US 201 / US 202 / SR 17 / SR 100 concurrency Western terminus of SR 9 / SR 17 concurrency Western terminus of SR 105
Kennebec	Augusta	87.7	141.1	SR 9 west (Hospital Street) – Randolph	Eastern terminus of SR 9 / SR 17 concurrency
Kennebec	Chelsea	92.3	148.5	SR 226 south (Togus Road) – Randolph	Northern terminus of SR 226
Lincoln	No major junctions				
Kennebec	Windsor	96.7	155.6	SR 32 north (Ridge Road) – Windsor	Western terminus of SR 17 / SR 32 concurrency
Lincoln	Whitefield	99.9	160.8	SR 218 south (Mills Road) – Whitefield	Northern terminus of SR 218
Lincoln	Jefferson	100.3	161.4	SR 32 south (Augusta Road) – Jefferson	Eastern terminus of SR 17 / SR 32 concurrency
Knox	Washington	105.3	169.5	SR 206 north to SR 105 – Washington	Southern terminus of SR 206
Knox	Washington	108.7	174.9	SR 220 (Waldoboro Road) – Waldoboro, Washington	
Knox	Union	114.2	183.8	SR 131 north (Appleton Road) – Appleton	Western terminus of SR 17 / SR 131 concurrency
Knox	Union	114.6	184.4	SR 235 south (Depot Road) – Union	Western terminus of SR 17 / SR 131 / SR 235 concurrency
Knox	Union	115.3	185.6	SR 131 south (South Union Road) – Warren	Eastern terminus of SR 17 / SR 131 concurrency
Knox	Union	117.4	188.9	SR 235 north (Buzzell Hill Road) – Hope	Eastern terminus of SR 17 / SR 235 concurrency
Knox	Rockport	122.9	197.8	SR 90 (West Street) – Warren, Rockport	
Knox	Rockland	128.0	206.0	US 1A south (Broadway)	Western terminus of US 1A / SR 17 concurrency
Knox	Rockland	128.3	206.5	US 1 (Camden Street) – Rockland, Rockport; US 1A	Eastern terminus of SR 17; northern terminus of US 1A
1.000 mi = 1.609 km; 1.000 km = 0.621 mi: Concurrency terminus

== Concurrent routes ==
- U.S. Route 2: 16.9 miles (27.2 km), Mexico to Wilton
- State Route 4: 2.8 miles (4.5 km), Jay to Livermore Falls
- State Route 133: 0.8 miles (1.3 km), Livermore Falls
- State Route 41: 2.1 miles (3.4 km), Readfield
- State Route 135: 0.9 miles (1.4 km), Readfield
- U.S. Route 202 / State Route 100: 4.9 miles (7.9 km), Manchester to Augusta
- State Route 11: 4.2 miles (6.8 km), Manchester to Augusta
- U.S. Route 201: 0.7 miles (1.1 km), Augusta
- State Route 9: 0.5 miles (0.80 km), Augusta
- State Route 32: 3.6 miles (5.8 km), Windsor to Jefferson
- State Route 131: 1.1 miles (1.8 km), Union
- State Route 235: 0.8 miles (1.3 km), Union
- U.S. Route 1A: 1.1 miles (1.8 km), Rockland
