= Maine State Route 173 =

State highway in Waldo County, Maine, US

State Route 173

Route information
- Maintained by MaineDOT
- Length: 20.93 mi (33.68 km)
- Existed: 1953–present

Major junctions
- South end: Islesboro Ferry in Lincolnville
- US 1 in Lincolnville; SR 52 in Lincolnville; SR 235 in Lincolnville; SR 131 in Searsmont
- North end: SR 220 in Liberty

Location
- Country: United States
- State: Maine
- Counties: Waldo

Highway system
- Maine State Highway System; Interstate; US; State; Auto trails; Lettered highways
| ← SR 172A | → SR 174 |

State Route 173 (SR 173) is a 20.9-mile-long (33.6 km) route that stretches from the Lincolnville Ferry Terminal in Lincolnville at its southern end to SR 220 in Liberty at its northern end. The route is located in Waldo County.

== Route description ==
SR 173 officially begins at the Lincolnville Ferry Terminal of the Islesboro Ferry (connecting to the town of Islesboro). The route winds through the community of Lincolnville within the town of the same name before reaching U.S. Route 1 (US 1). Now following Beach Road, SR 173 generally heads northwest through forested area paralleling Frohock Brook at first as it curves around hills of Camden Hills State Park. The road makes sharper curves at the communities of Carvers Corner and Stevens Corner until it reaches Drakes Corner where SR 52 forms a concurrency with SR 173. The two routes together head into Lincolnville Center, the home of the administrative buildings of the town, on Main Street. The road intersects SR 235 at its northern terminus before SR 52 splits from the concurrency allowing SR 173 to continue alone on Searsmont Road. It enters the town of Searsmont and curves around Levenseller Mountain.

At Bickfords Corner, SR 173 makes a sharp turn to the southwest to cross a small stream then travels west. The road comes to a T-intersection with SR 131 where SR 173 heads southwest on Main Street with SR 131 to downtown Searsmont. Just south of the St. George River, SR 173 ends its concurrency with SR 131 and heads west along Woodmans Hill Road through a wooded area. It later curves to the northwest and passes through the unincorporated communities of Woodmans Hill and South Montville (the latter of which is along SR 173's short portion within Montville). Along Stevens Pond Road, the route reaches Trues Pond Road and heads west through downtown Liberty as the town's main street. The route ends at an intersection with SR 220.

== Junction list ==
The entire route is in Waldo County.

| Location | mi | km | Destinations | Notes |
|---|---|---|---|---|
| Lincolnville | 0.00 | 0.00 | Islesboro Ferry, Lincolnville Terminal – Islesboro | |
| Lincolnville | 0.14 | 0.23 | US 1 (Atlantic Highway) – Belfast, Camden | |
| Lincolnville | 5.28 | 8.50 | SR 52 south (Camden Road) – Camden | Southern end of SR 52 concurrency |
| Lincolnville | 5.96 | 9.59 | SR 235 south (Hope Road) – Hope | Northern terminus of SR 235 |
| Lincolnville | 6.07 | 9.77 | SR 52 north (Belfast Road) / Heal Road – Belfast | Northern end of SR 52 concurrency |
| Searsmont | 12.91 | 20.78 | SR 131 north – Belmont Corner, Swanville | Southern end of SR 131 concurrency |
| Searsmont | 13.78 | 22.18 | SR 131 south (Main Street) – Appleton | Northern end of SR 131 concurrency |
| Liberty | 20.93 | 33.68 | SR 220 (Pinnacle Road / West Main Street) – Thorndike, Unity, Waldoboro | |
1.000 mi = 1.609 km; 1.000 km = 0.621 mi: Concurrency terminus
