= Maine State Route 90 =

State highway in Knox County, Maine, US

State Route 90

Route information
- Maintained by MaineDOT
- Length: 10.81 mi (17.40 km)
- Existed: 1946–present

Major junctions
- West end: US 1 in Warren
- SR 131 in Warren; SR 17 in Rockport
- East end: US 1 in Rockport

Location
- Country: United States
- State: Maine
- Counties: Knox

Highway system
- Maine State Highway System; Interstate; US; State; Auto trails; Lettered highways
← SR 89	→ SR 91

State Route 90 (SR 90) is part of Maine's system of numbered state highways, located in Knox County. It is a minor highway serving as a bypass of Rockland on U.S. Route 1 (US 1), which it connects to at both ends.

== Route description ==
SR 90 begins at US 1 in Warren. The route runs eastward, crossing SR 131 on its way out of town. SR 90 continues northeast across the northwestern corner of Rockland into the town of Rockport where it crosses SR 17 and meets its eastern end at US 1.

== Major intersections ==
The entire route is in Knox County.

Location	mi	km	Destinations	Notes
Warren	0.00	0.00	US 1 (Atlantic Highway) – Waldoboro, Rockland, Bath	
Warren	1.39	2.24	SR 131 (Oyster River Road) – Union, Warren	
Rockport	8.10	13.04	SR 17 (Rockland Street) – Augusta, Rockland	
Rockport	10.81	17.40	US 1 (Commercial Street) / West Street – Camden, Rockland, Rockport	
1.000 mi = 1.609 km; 1.000 km = 0.621 mi
