= Camden (CDP), Maine =

Camden, Maine
- Census-designated place
- Location in Knox County and the state of Maine
- Coordinates: 44°12′48″N 69°04′04″W
- Country: United States
- State: Maine
- County: Knox
- Town: Camden

Area
  - Total: 3.77 sq mi (9.76 km^{2})
  - Land: 3.76 sq mi (9.75 km^{2})
  - Water: 0.0039 sq mi (0.01 km^{2})
- Elevation: 85 ft (26 m)

Population (2020)
  - Total: 3,850
  - Density: 1,022.7/sq mi (394.87/km^{2})
- Time zone: UTC-5 (Eastern (EST))
  - Summer (DST): UTC-4 (EDT)
- ZIP Code: 04843
- Area code: 207
- FIPS code: 23-09690
- GNIS feature ID: 2377896

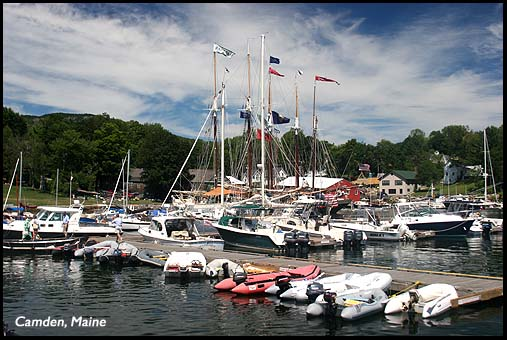
Camden, Maine

Camden is a census-designated place (CDP) comprising the main village in the town of Camden in Knox County, Maine, United States. The population was 3,570 at the 2010 census, out of 4,850 in the entire town of Camden.

== Geography ==
The Camden CDP is located in the southeastern part of the town of Camden where the Megunticook River enters Penobscot Bay. The CDP extends south to the Rockport town line, west to Simonton Road and Cobb Road, and north to Mount Battie Road and Beloin Road. The east edge of the CDP follows the shore of Penobscot Bay. The 790-foot (240 m) summit of Mount Battie, part of Camden Hills State Park, is within the CDP.

U.S. Route 1 passes through the center of the village, leading north 18 miles (29 km) to Belfast and south 8 miles (13 km) to Rockland. Maine State Routes 52 (Mountain Street) and 105 (Washington Street) lead northwest out of the village. Route 52 leads 7 miles (11 km) to Lincolnville Center, while Route 105 leads 6 miles (10 km) to Hope.

According to the United States Census Bureau, the CDP has a total area of 3.8 square miles (9.8 km^{2}), all land.

== Demographics ==
Historical population
Census	Pop.	Note	%±
2020	3,850		—
U.S. Decennial Census

As of the census of 2000, there were 3,934 people, 1,826 households, and 1,028 families residing in the CDP. The population density was 1,041.1 inhabitants per square mile (402.0/km^{2}). There were 2,108 housing units at an average density of 557.9 per square mile (215.4/km^{2}). The racial makeup of the CDP was 98.20% White, 0.31% Black or African American, 0.13% Native American, 0.41% Asian, 0.18% from other races, and 0.79% from two or more races. Hispanic or Latino of any race were 0.84% of the population.

There were 1,826 households, out of which 22.8% had children under the age of 18 living with them, 45.7% were married couples living together, 9.0% had a female householder with no husband present, and 43.7% were non-families. 37.8% of all households were made up of individuals, and 18.6% had someone living alone who was 65 years of age or older. The average household size was 2.04 and the average family size was 2.68.

In the CDP, the population was spread out, with 18.7% under the age of 18, 4.6% from 18 to 24, 21.9% from 25 to 44, 29.0% from 45 to 64, and 25.8% who were 65 years of age or older. The median age was 48 years. For every 100 females, there were 79.9 males. For every 100 females age 18 and over, there were 73.1 males.

The median income for a household in the CDP was $39,891, and the median income for a family was $57,554. Males had a median income of $32,273 versus $26,702 for females. The per capita income for the CDP was $25,880. About 6.2% of families and 10.0% of the population were below the poverty line, including 9.0% of those under age 18 and 9.7% of those age 65 or over.
