= Lincolnville Center Meeting House =

Historic church in Maine, United States

- U.S. National Register of Historic Places
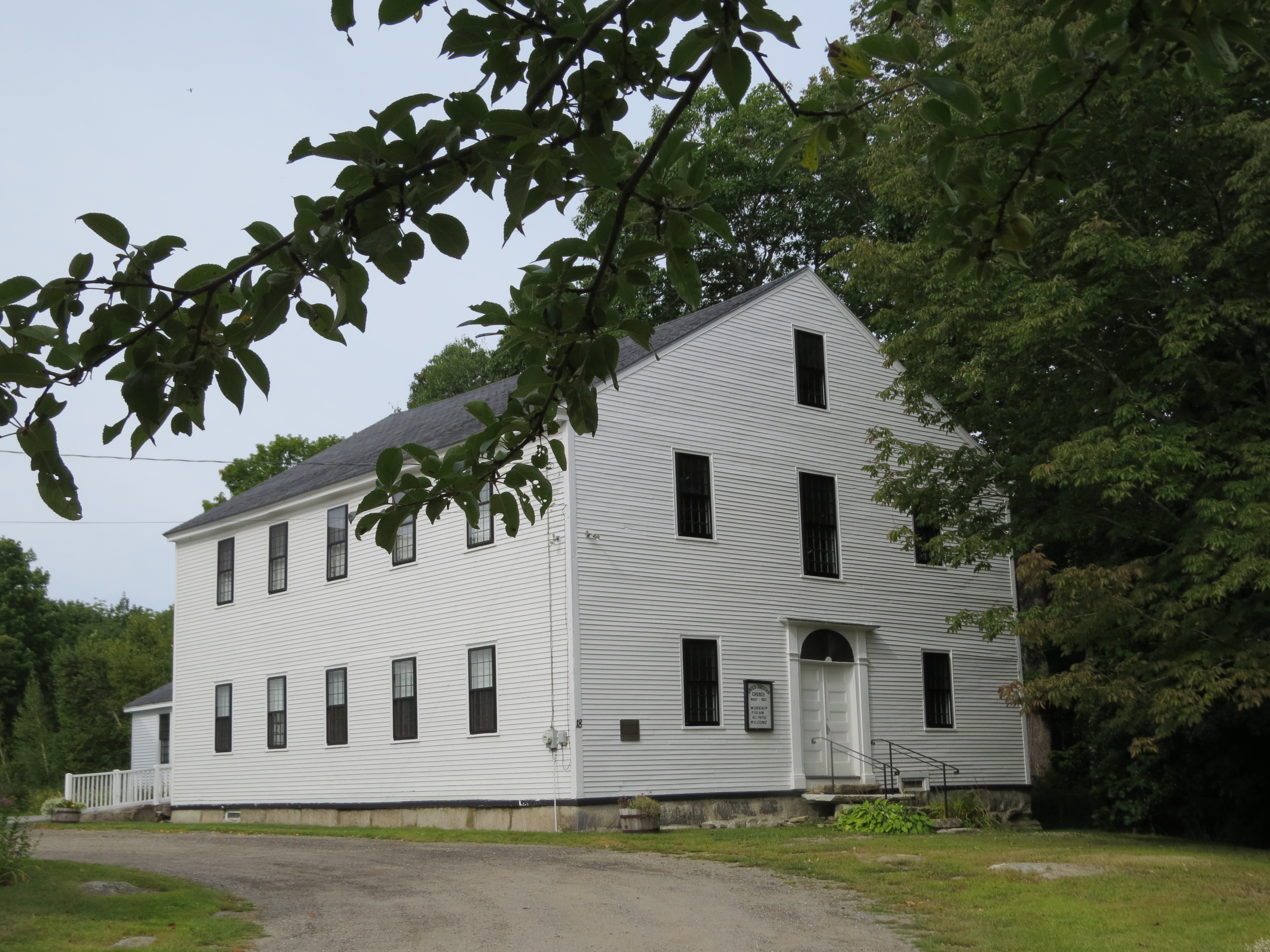

- Location within Maine Location within the United States
- Location: ME 173, Lincolnville Center, Maine
- Coordinates: 44°17′55″N 69°6′33″W
- Area: 0.5 acres (0.20 ha)
- Built: 1820
- Architect: Lamb, Joshua, Jr.
- Architectural style: Federal
- NRHP reference No.: 83000475
- Added to NRHP: July 21, 1983

The Lincolnville United Christian Church, formerly the Lincolnville Center Meeting House, is a historic church in Lincolnville Center, Maine. Built in 1820, the main church building is one of the least-altered Federal period churches in the state of Maine, with features reminiscent of earlier colonial-era meeting houses. The building was listed on the National Register of Historic Places in 1983. The church congregation is affiliated with the United Church of Christ; its current pastor is Rev. Elizabeth Barnum.

== Description and history ==
The Lincolnville United Christian Church is located in the rural village center of Lincolnville, on the west side of Searsmont Road (Maine State Route 173), a short way north of its junction with Heal Road. The church is set back from the road, on a property that includes the main church building, a parish hall, and a community building. The main church is a rectangular 2-1/2 story wood frame structure, with a front-facing gable roof, clapboard siding, and a foundation that is partly granite slab, and partly bedrock. The front (east-facing) facade is symmetrical, with a center entrance flanked by pilasters and topped by a Federal style fan and an entablature. Windows are 12-over-12 sash throughout, except the window above the entrance, which is 16-over-12. The interior retains all or most of its original box pews, and has the unusual configuration of a raised pulpit in the front of the building, just behind the vestibule. This configuration made it possible for the entire congregation to see latecomers, and is extremely rare in Maine. The lack of a steeple and the building's basic form are similar to those of earlier colonial meeting houses, which more typically had the pulpit located on a long wall.

The meeting house was built in 1821 as a financial venture by Joshua Lamb, who sought to recoup his costs by the sale of pews. This business endeavour was unsuccessful, and he ended up deeding the property to the congregation. The building has undergone only very modest alterations, including the installation in the early 20th century of a tin roof, and the installation of asphalt shingling on the roof. The parish hall, attached to the rear of the building, provides handicapped access.
