= Maine State Route 105 =

State highway in Maine, US

State Route 105

Route information
- Maintained by MaineDOT
- Length: 47.7 mi (76.8 km)

Major junctions
- West end: US 201 / US 202 / SR 9 / SR 17 in Augusta
- SR 32 in Windsor; SR 220 in South Liberty; SR 131 in Appleton; SR 235 in Hope
- East end: US 1 in Camden

Location
- Country: United States
- State: Maine
- Counties: Kennebec, Lincoln, Waldo, Knox

Highway system
- Maine State Highway System; Interstate; US; State; Auto trails; Lettered highways
← SR 104	→ SR 106

State Route 105 (SR 105) is a highway in the south-central part of the U.S. state of Maine. SR 105 begins in Augusta at Cony Circle where it intersects U.S. Route 201 (US 201), US 202, and State Routes 9, 17, and 100. It continues east approximately for 48 miles (77 km) until it terminates at US 1 in Camden.

== Major intersections ==
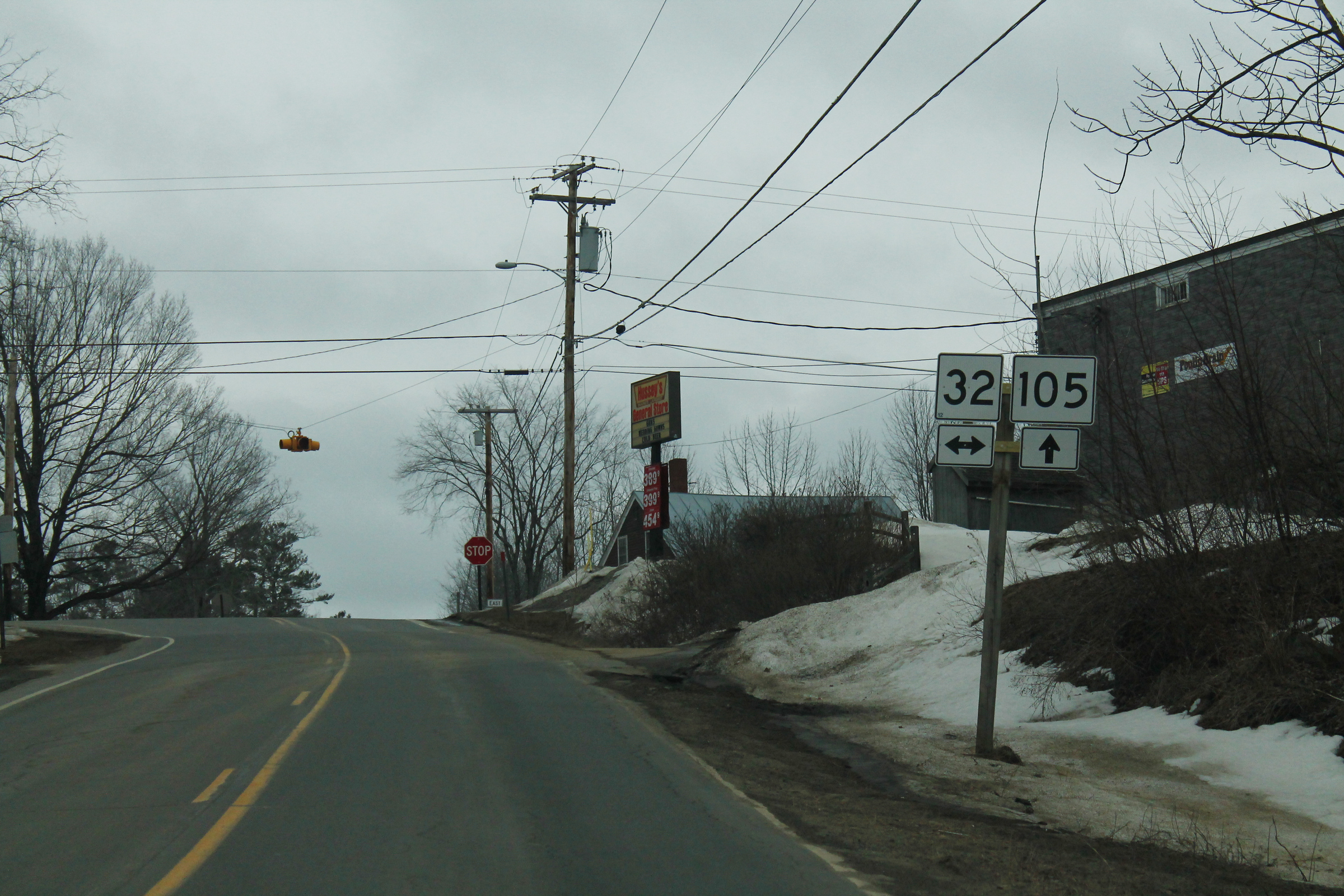
SR 105 at SR 32 in Windsor

County	Location	mi	km	Destinations	Notes
Kennebec	Augusta	0.0	0.0	US 201 / US 202 / SR 9 / SR 17 / SR 100 / Cony Street – Gardiner, Randolph, Waterville	West end of SR 105; Cony Circle (roundabout)
Kennebec	Windsor	9.7	15.6	SR 32 – South China, South Windsor	
Lincoln	No major junctions				
Knox	Washington	18.6	29.9	SR 206 south – Jefferson	
Knox	Washington	22.1	35.6	SR 220 south – Waldoboro	West end of overlap with SR 220
Waldo	Liberty	25.6	41.2	SR 220 north – Liberty	East end of overlap with SR 220
Knox	Appleton	31.8	51.2	SR 131 south – Union	West end of overlap with SR 131
Knox	Appleton	36.4	58.6	SR 131 north – Searsmont	East end of overlap with SR 131
Knox	Hope	41.1	66.1	SR 235 south / Church Street – Union	West end of overlap with SR 235
Knox	Hope	42.4	68.2	SR 235 north – Lincolnville Center	East end of overlap with SR 235
Knox	Camden	47.7	76.8	US 1 – Lincolnville, Rockland	East end of SR 105
1.000 mi = 1.609 km; 1.000 km = 0.621 mi: Concurrency terminus
