= Warren, Maine =

Town in Maine, United States

- Town
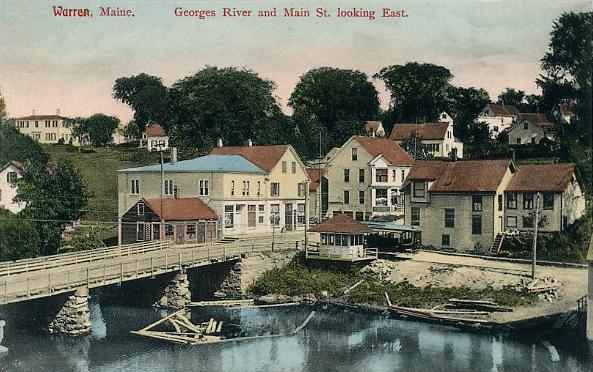
- St. George River and Main Street c. 1908

- Seal

- Location in Knox County and the state of Maine.
- Coordinates: 44°07′46″N 69°14′57″W
- Country: United States
- State: Maine
- County: Knox
- Incorporated: 1776
- Villages: Warren; East Warren; South Warren; Warren Station; Wattons Mill; White Oak Corner; Whitney Corner

Area
  - Total: 48.75 sq mi (126.26 km^{2})
  - Land: 46.47 sq mi (120.36 km^{2})
  - Water: 2.28 sq mi (5.91 km^{2})
- Elevation: 56 ft (17 m)

Population (2020)
  - Total: 4,865
  - Density: 105/sq mi (40.4/km^{2})
- Time zone: UTC-5 (Eastern (EST))
  - Summer (DST): UTC-4 (EDT)
- ZIP code: 04864
- Area code: 207
- FIPS code: 23-80215
- GNIS feature ID: 582790
- Website: warrenmaine.org

Warren is a town in Knox County, Maine, United States. The population was 4,865 at the 2020 census. It includes the villages of East Warren, Warren and South Warren, the latter home to the Maine State Prison and minimum security Bolduc Correctional Facility.

== History ==
Part of the Waldo Patent, it was called the Upper Town of St. Georges Plantation. It was first settled by Scots-Irish settlers from Londonderry in 1736 under the auspices of Brigadier-General Samuel Waldo, its proprietor. Development was hindered, however, by the ongoing French and Indian Wars. In 1753, a blockhouse was built and placed under the command of Captain Thomas Kilpatrick, known by terrified Indians as "Tom-kill-the-devil." War raged across Maine between 1754–1758, and local settlers took refuge in the blockhouse or at another in Cushing. Hostilities ended in 1759 with the Fall of Quebec. On November 7, 1776, Upper Town of St. Georges Plantation was incorporated as a town, named after Joseph Warren, a Revolutionary War hero.

Hay was the principal crop. Shipbuilding was an important industry, and between 1770–1850, 224 vessels were built, varying from 53 to 1,127 tons. Warren had quarries to extract granite and limestone. Falls on the St. George River provided water power, with the first sawmill built in 1785. Woolens were manufactured at the Georges River Mills, and snowshoes at the Warren Shoe Factory. The Knox and Lincoln Railroad opened on November 6, 1871.

The General Henry Knox Canal system (named after Henry Knox, who purchased the locks in 1794) was initially built by Charles Barrett in 1793 to connect the tidewaters of the St. George River with St. George Lake in Liberty, facilitating the shipment of lumber and lime. But the locks fell into decay following Knox's death in 1806. In 1848, the canal was reopened for navigation by the Georges Canal Company at a cost of $80,000. It again fell into disuse following 1877, rendered obsolete by the railroad. The canal banks and one lock may still be seen in Warren, however, uncovered as part of a river beautification project in 1966.

In 1853, Warren elected Olive Rose as County Register of Deeds. She was the first woman to hold elected office in the United States. Warren became a part of Knox county when it was partitioned in 1860 from parts of Waldo and Lincoln counties.

Since 2002, South Warren is home to the Maine State Prison, a 900-bed maximum security facility formerly located in Thomaston since 1824. The prison's gift shop, which sells over 600 inmate-made goods, remains in Thomaston at the site of the old prison.

=== Peterborough ===
In South Warren was the site of Peterborough, a black settlement first founded in 1782. Three possible legends try to explain the foundation of this community. One suggests that Amos Peters, a black Revolutionary War veteran from Plymouth, Massachusetts, was working for General Henry Knox. When Peters married another slave named Sarah, Knox gave the couple land to settle on in what later became Peterborough. Following the 1780 Quock Walker court case, Amos and Sarah Peters were freed from slavery. Another story suggests that General Knox, who served in Virginia during the War, built himself a mansion that matched the style of estates he had seen in Virginia. He recruited blacks to serve as staff for the mansion. As space at the estate and servants quarters shrunk, "Knox sent many of the families to live in the settlement started by Amos and Sarah Peters". Another story suggests that many of the original settlers of the community were so-called "limecoasters", black deckhands who were part of the Lime trade from Thomaston to the Southern US.

Regardless of the origin, the community grew, having a population of over three hundred people at its peak. In 1823, the population of children in the settlement was enough to warrant its own school. In 1845, the town of Warren provided $75 for the building of a schoolhouse in Peterborough. The school had both black and white teachers, and attendance averaged between twenty-four and thirty students in a given year. The school building also housed church services and social events.

The population of the settlement began to decline by the end of the Civil War. The decline of the shipbuilding industry in the area, coupled with the fact that black people were excluded from factory work, are theorized as some of the factors behind this reduction. The area was populated by descendants of the original settlers until 1961, when William, Grace and Woodrow Peters moved from Peterborough to a house along Route 90. Today the area is made up of newer houses with no residents having roots to the original community.

== Geography ==
According to the United States Census Bureau, the town has a total area of 48.75 square miles (126.26 km^{2}), of which 46.47 square miles (120.36 km^{2}) is land and 2.28 square miles (5.91 km^{2}) is water. Drained by the Back River, Warren is located at the head of tide on the banks of the St. George River.

It is crossed by U.S. Route 1 and state routes 90, 131 and 235. It borders the towns of Union to the north, Rockport to the northeast, Rockland to the east, Thomaston to the southeast, Cushing to the south, Friendship to the southwest, and Waldoboro to the west.

== Demographics ==
Historical population
Census	Pop.	Note	%±
1790	646		—
1800	939		45.4%
1810	1,443		53.7%
1820	1,825		26.5%
1830	2,030		11.2%
1840	2,228		9.8%
1850	2,428		9.0%
1860	2,321		−4.4%
1870	1,974		−15.0%
1880	2,166		9.7%
1890	2,037		−6.0%
1900	2,069		1.6%
1910	1,812		−12.4%
1920	1,500		−17.2%
1930	1,429		−4.7%
1940	1,458		2.0%
1950	1,576		8.1%
1960	1,678		6.5%
1970	1,864		11.1%
1980	2,566		37.7%
1990	3,192		24.4%
2000	3,794		18.9%
2010	4,751		25.2%
2020	4,865		2.4%
U.S. Decennial Census

=== 2010 census ===
As of the census of 2010, there were 4,751 people, 1,508 households, and 1,086 families residing in the town. The population density was 102.2 inhabitants per square mile (39.5/km^{2}). There were 1,760 housing units at an average density of 37.9 per square mile (14.6/km^{2}). The racial makeup of the town was 95.3% White, 1.7% African American, 0.7% Native American, 0.4% Asian, 0.5% from other races, and 1.3% from two or more races. Hispanic or Latino of any race were 1.0% of the population.

There were 1,508 households, of which 32.1% had children under the age of 18 living with them, 56.0% were married couples living together, 10.0% had a female householder with no husband present, 6.0% had a male householder with no wife present, and 28.0% were non-families. 20.5% of all households were made up of individuals, and 6.6% had someone living alone who was 65 years of age or older. The average household size was 2.52 and the average family size was 2.86.

The median age in the town was 39.9 years. 18.4% of residents were under the age of 18; 7.4% were between the ages of 18 and 24; 32.3% were from 25 to 44; 32.2% were from 45 to 64; and 9.9% were 65 years of age or older. The gender makeup of the town was 59.1% male and 40.9% female.

=== 2000 census ===
As of the census of 2000, there were 3,794 people, 1,346 households, and 970 families residing in the town. The population density was 81.8 inhabitants per square mile (31.6/km^{2}). There were 1,534 housing units at an average density of 33.1 per square mile (12.8/km^{2}). The racial makeup of the town was 97.55% White, 0.29% African American, 0.76% Native American, 0.40% Asian, 0.03% Pacific Islander, 0.05% from other races, and 0.92% from two or more races. Hispanic or Latino of any race were 0.74% of the population.

There were 1,346 households, out of which 37.1% had children under the age of 18 living with them, 58.8% were married couples living together, 8.5% had a female householder with no husband present, and 27.9% were non-families. 20.1% of all households were made up of individuals, and 7.5% had someone living alone who was 65 years of age or older. The average household size was 2.60 and the average family size was 2.98.

In the town, the population was spread out, with 25.4% under the age of 18, 6.9% from 18 to 24, 32.8% from 25 to 44, 24.7% from 45 to 64, and 10.2% who were 65 years of age or older. The median age was 37 years. For every 100 females, there were 112.9 males. For every 100 females age 18 and over, there were 118.3 males.

The median income for a household in the town was $35,662, and the median income for a family was $41,086. Males had a median income of $30,109 versus $20,638 for females. The per capita income for the town was $15,655. About 3.3% of families and 6.7% of the population were below the poverty line, including 3.8% of those under age 18 and 4.5% of those age 65 or over.

== Education ==
Regional School Unit 40 operates public schools. Warren Community School is in Warren.

Medomak Valley Middle School and Medomak Valley High School are in nearby Waldoboro.

Warren Free Public Library is in Warren.

== Sites of interest ==
- Lie-Nielsen Toolworks

== Notable people ==
- Norman Wallace Lermond, socialist activist and naturalist
- Ellis Spear, Civil War era general
- Samuel Thatcher, US congressman
