= Maine State Route 141 =

State highway in Waldo County, Maine, US

State Route 141

Route information
- Maintained by MaineDOT
- Length: 13.17 mi (21.20 km)
- Existed: 1925–present

Major junctions
- South end: US 1 / SR 3 in Belfast
- SR 131 in Swanville
- North end: SR 139 in Monroe

Location
- Country: United States
- State: Maine
- Counties: Waldo

Highway system
- Maine State Highway System; Interstate; US; State; Auto trails; Lettered highways
← SR 140	→ SR 142

State Route 141 (SR 141) is a route from U.S. Route 1 (US 1) and SR 3 in Belfast to SR 139 in Monroe. The route's entire length is in Waldo County.

== Junction list ==
The entire route is in Waldo County.

Location	mi	km	Destinations	Notes
Belfast	0.00	0.00	US 1 / SR 3 (Searsport Avenue) – Ellsworth, Belfast, Rockport	
Swanville	6.48	10.43	SR 131 south (Town House Road) – Searsmont, Morrill	Northern terminus of SR 131
Monroe	13.17	21.20	SR 139 (Main Street) / Jackson Road – Brooks, Winterport	
1.000 mi = 1.609 km; 1.000 km = 0.621 mi
