= School Union 69 =

School district in Maine, United States

School Union 69 is a school district headquartered in Hope, Maine. It serves Hope, Appleton, and Lincolnville.

Its schools:

- Appleton Village School - K-8
- Hope Elementary School
- Lincolnville Central School (LCS)

It feeds into Camden Hills Regional High School of the Five Town Community School District.
