= Pittsfield (CDP), Maine =

Pittsfield, Maine
- Census-designated place
- Location within Maine Location within the United States
- Coordinates: 44°45′50″N 69°22′42″W
- Country: United States
- State: Maine
- County: Somerset

Area
  - Total: 9.61 sq mi (24.88 km^{2})
  - Land: 9.40 sq mi (24.34 km^{2})
  - Water: 0.21 sq mi (0.54 km^{2})
- Elevation: 203 ft (62 m)

Population (2020)
  - Total: 2,822
  - Density: 300.3/sq mi (115.94/km^{2})
- Time zone: UTC-5 (Eastern (EST))
  - Summer (DST): UTC-4 (EDT)
- ZIP code: 04967
- Area code: 207
- FIPS code: 23-58970
- GNIS feature ID: 2377949

Pittsfield is a census-designated place (CDP) in the town of Pittsfield in Somerset County, Maine, United States. The population was 3,217 at the 2000 census.

== Geography ==
According to the United States Census Bureau, the CDP has a total area of 9.6 square miles (24.8 km^{2}), of which 9.4 square miles (24.2 km^{2}) is land and 0.2 square mile (0.6 km^{2}) (2.30%) is water.

== Demographics ==
Historical population
Census	Pop.	Note	%±
2020	2,822		—
U.S. Decennial Census

As of the census of 2000, there were 3,217 people, 1,235 households, and 864 families residing in the CDP. The population density was 343.8 inhabitants per square mile (132.7/km^{2}). There were 1,343 housing units at an average density of 143.5 per square mile (55.4/km^{2}). The racial makeup of the CDP was 95.68% White, 0.93% Black or African American, 0.37% Native American, 1.37% Asian, 0.16% Pacific Islander, 0.06% from other races, and 1.43% from two or more races. Hispanic or Latino of any race were 0.59% of the population.

There were 1,235 households, out of which 38.1% had children under the age of 18 living with them, 51.7% were married couples living together, 14.4% had a female householder with no husband present, and 30.0% were non-families. 25.0% of all households were made up of individuals, and 11.5% had someone living alone who was 65 years of age or older. The average household size was 2.49 and the average family size was 2.95.

In the CDP, the population was spread out, with 28.6% under the age of 18, 8.1% from 18 to 24, 28.5% from 25 to 44, 20.8% from 45 to 64, and 13.9% who were 65 years of age or older. The median age was 36 years. For every 100 females, there were 90.1 males. For every 100 females age 18 and over, there were 84.9 males.

The median income for a household in the CDP was $32,941, and the median income for a family was $40,561. Males had a median income of $31,856 versus $23,050 for females. The per capita income for the CDP was $16,236. About 11.1% of families and 12.7% of the population were below the poverty line, including 16.1% of those under age 18 and 4.5% of those age 65 or over.
