= Unity (CDP), Maine =

Unity, Maine
- Census-designated place
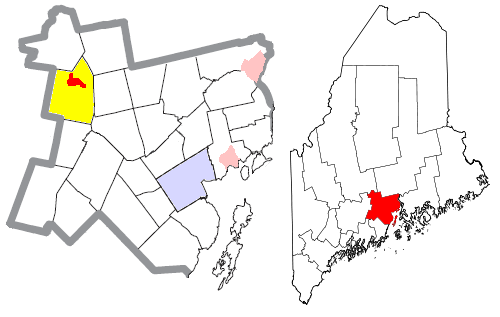
- Location of Unity (in red) in Waldo County and the state of Maine
- Coordinates: 44°37′25″N 69°20′21″W
- Country: United States
- State: Maine
- County: Waldo

Area
  - Total: 1.84 sq mi (4.76 km^{2})
  - Land: 1.83 sq mi (4.75 km^{2})
  - Water: 0.0039 sq mi (0.01 km^{2})
- Elevation: 220 ft (67 m)

Population (2020)
  - Total: 448
  - Density: 244.5/sq mi (94.39/km^{2})
- Time zone: UTC-5 (Eastern (EST))
  - Summer (DST): UTC-4 (EDT)
- ZIP code: 04988
- Area code: 207
- FIPS code: 23-78220
- GNIS feature ID: 2377963

Unity is a census-designated place (CDP) in the town of Unity in Waldo County, Maine, United States. The population was 448 at the 2020 census.

== Geography ==
According to the United States Census Bureau, the CDP has a total area of 1.8 square miles (4.7 km^{2}), all land.

== Demographics ==
Historical population
Census	Pop.	Note	%±
2020	448		—
U.S. Decennial Census

As of the census of 2000, there were 486 people, 244 households, and 112 families residing in the CDP. The population density was 267.3 inhabitants per square mile (103.2/km^{2}). There were 319 housing units at an average density of 175.4 per square mile (67.7/km^{2}). The racial makeup of the CDP was 96.91% White, 0.21% Black or African American, 0.82% Native American, and 2.06% from two or more races. Hispanic or Latino of any race were 1.03% of the population.

There were 244 households, out of which 23.8% had children under the age of 18 living with them, 29.9% were married couples living together, 13.1% had a female householder with no husband present, and 53.7% were non-families. 42.6% of all households were made up of individuals, and 23.4% had someone living alone who was 65 years of age or older. The average household size was 1.99 and the average family size was 2.74.

In the CDP, the population was spread out, with 21.6% under the age of 18, 15.0% from 18 to 24, 21.8% from 25 to 44, 18.9% from 45 to 64, and 22.6% who were 65 years of age or older. The median age was 36 years. For every 100 females, there were 77.4 males. For every 100 females age 18 and over, there were 78.0 males.

The median income for a household in the CDP was $18,333, and the median income for a family was $30,417. Males had a median income of $29,250 versus $23,182 for females. The per capita income for the CDP was $15,043. About 29.3% of families and 33.1% of the population were below the poverty line, including 32.4% of those under age 18 and 25.2% of those age 65 or over.
