= Camden Hills State Park =

State park in Knox County, Maine

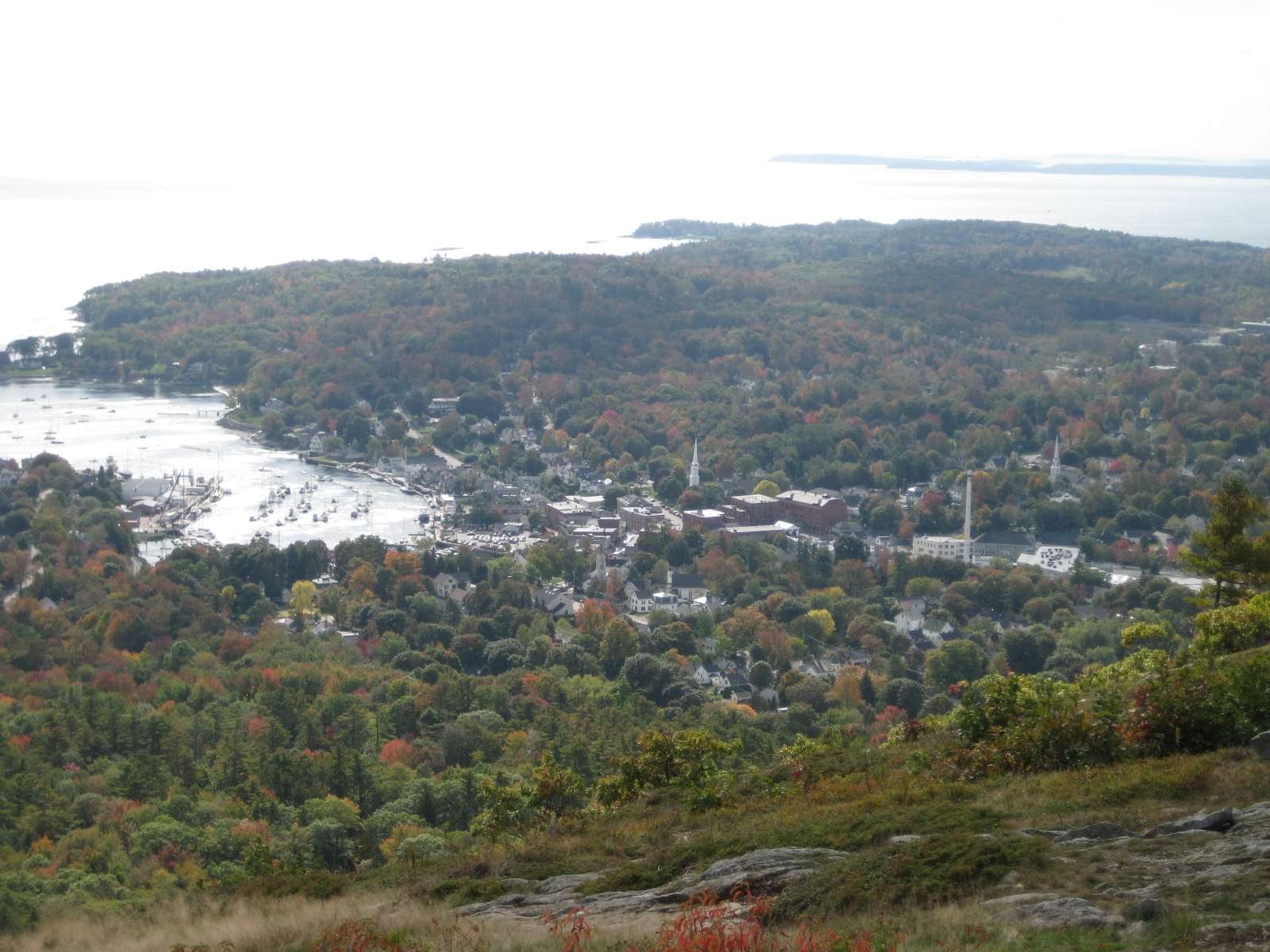
- Camden from the summit of Mount Battie

- Location within Maine
- Interactive map of Camden Hills State Park
- Location: Camden, Maine, United States
- Coordinates: 44.230138°N 69.0473°W
- Area: 5,710 acres (23.1 km^{2})
- Elevation: 259 ft (79 m)
- Established: 1947
- Administrator: Maine Department of Agriculture, Conservation and Forestry
- Website: Official website
- Maine State Parks

Camden Hills State Park is a 5,710-acre (2,310 ha) public recreation area overlooking Penobscot Bay in the town of Camden, Knox County, Maine. The state park features multi-use trails to Mount Battie, Mount Megunticook, and other scenic locales. The park is managed by the Maine Department of Agriculture, Conservation and Forestry.

== History ==
The park was developed during the 1930s by the Civilian Conservation Corps working at the direction of the National Park Service. The Camden Hills CCC camp was in operation from June 1935 to September 1941 creating roads, trails, buildings, and recreational facilities. The land was turned over to the state in 1947. The Mount Battie Auto Road was completed in 1965. The Maine Conservation Corps added a stone staircase for ocean access in 1990.

== Activities and amenities ==
The park is crossed by numerous trails for hiking, horseback riding, mountain biking, cross-country skiing, snowmobiling, and snowshoeing. An auto road can be driven to a parking area near the top of Mount Battie at nearly 800 feet (240 m). The trail up 1,385-foot-high (422 m) Mount Megunticook leads to the tallest peak in the park. The mile-long Maiden Cliff Trail ends at a monument to 12-year-old Elenora French, whose misadventure in 1864 gave the site its name. The park also offers opportunities for hunting and camping as well as rock climbing.

== See also ==
- List of subranges of the Appalachian Mountains
