= Area code 207 =

Telephone area code of Maine

Coordinates: 45°0′0″N 69°0′0″W

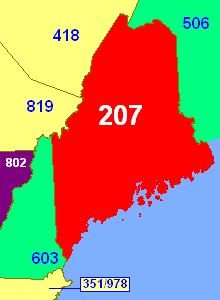
Numbering plan area 207 of Maine's (red)

Area code 207 is the sole telephone area code in the North American Numbering Plan (NANP) for the U.S. state of Maine. Area code 207 was assigned as one of the original North American area codes in 1947. The numbering plan area retains its original boundaries, having never been split or overlaid.

As of April 2025, area code 207 is not threatened by office code exhaustion until the first quarter of 2045. The deadline has been extended several times due to technical changes and number pooling.

Some small Maine communities near the Canadian border are not serviced by area code 207. For example, the northernmost village of Estcourt Station has local routing infrastructure into Canada. It is included in Quebec's 367/418/581 overlay complex.

== Central office prefixes ==
Central office prefixes in area code 207
Prefix	Location	County	Introduced
200	Portland	Cumberland	April 11, 2011
203	Gardiner	Kennebec	October 24, 2006
204	Kennebunkport	York	December 18, 2006
205	Biddeford	York	September 26, 2001
206	Sanford	York	December 22, 2006
208	Brunswick	Cumberland	July 6, 2007
209	Portland	Cumberland	October 3, 2011
210	Portland	Cumberland	March 3, 2001
212	Lewiston	Androscoggin	October 13, 1999
213	Augusta	Kennebec	October 16, 2009
214	Calais	Washington	November 20, 1998
215	Augusta	Kennebec	October 13, 1999
216	Wells	York	April 3, 2007
217	Bangor	Penobscot	December 14, 2006
218	Belfast	Waldo	September 24, 2002
219	Scarborough	Cumberland	September 12, 2011
220	Oxford	Oxford	July 21, 2020
221	Portland	Cumberland	October 13, 1999
222	Gorham	Cumberland	June 4, 2002
223	Winterport	Waldo	
224	Livermore	Androscoggin	
225	Turner	Androscoggin	
226	Rockland	Knox	October 31, 2000
227	Presque Isle	Aroostook	January 25, 1998
228	Portland	Cumberland	January 25, 1998
229	Biddeford	York	May 18, 1998
230	Camden	Knox	January 10, 1996
231	Fort Kent	Aroostook	December 22, 2003
232	Portland	Cumberland	
233	Portland	Cumberland	
234	Dixmont	Penobscot	
235	Kingfield	Franklin	
236	Camden	Knox	
237	Stratton	Franklin	
238	Fairfield	Somerset	October 11, 1997
239	Portland	Cumberland	May 18, 1998
240	Lewiston	Androscoggin	September 11, 1994
241	Lewiston	Androscoggin	May 24, 2011
242	Augusta	Kennebec	
243	Stratton	Franklin	
244	Southwest Harbor	Hancock	
245	Portland	Cumberland	September 9, 2011
246	Eustis	Franklin	
247	Waterboro	York	
248	Augusta	Kennebec	October 3, 2011
249	Brewer	Penobscot	August 14, 1998
250	Waterville	Kennebec	April 12, 2016
251	Ogunquit	York	August 14, 1998
252	Portland	Cumberland	August 14, 1998
253	Portland	Cumberland	August 14, 1998
254	Houlton	Aroostook	September 15, 2011
255	Machias	Washington	
256	Fryeburg	Oxford	October 13, 1999
257	Detroit	Somerset	
259	Machiasport	Washington	
261	Millinocket	Penobscot	August 12, 2016
262	Bangor	Penobscot	
263	Wesley	Washington	November 20, 1998
264	Portland	Cumberland	January 11, 1997
265	Kingfield	Franklin	
266	Surry	Hancock	
267	Oakfield	Aroostook	October 11, 1997
268	Litchfield	Kennebec	
269	Carmel	Penobscot	
270	Garland	Penobscot	October 11, 1997
271	Wesley	Washington	November 20, 1998
272	Portland	Cumberland	May 8, 2003
273	Warren	Knox	
274	Portland	Cumberland	June 8, 2011
275	Portland	Cumberland	May 10, 1999
276	Mount Desert	Hancock	
277	St. Albans	Somerset	
278	Corinna	Penobscot	
279	Brownville	Piscataquis	October 11, 1997
280	Monson	Piscataquis	October 11, 1997
281	Biddeford	York	
282	Biddeford	York	
283	Biddeford	York	
284	Biddeford	York	
285	Corinth	Penobscot	
286	Biddeford	York	
287	Augusta	Kennebec	
288	Bar Harbor	Hancock	
289	Scarborough	Cumberland	April 16, 2001
290	Lincoln	Penobscot	October 11, 1997
291	Harrison	Cumberland	November 16, 2016
292	Biddeford	York	June 29, 2016
293	Vienna	Kennebec	
294	Biddeford	York	July 1, 1996
295	Brunswick	Cumberland	June 28, 2016
296	Stetson	Penobscot	
297	Eustis	Franklin	
298	Buxton	Cumberland	November 26, 2008
299	Bangor	Penobscot	November 20, 1998
300	Bangor	Penobscot	April 26, 2018
301	Rockland	Knox	November 7, 2018
302	Standish	Cumberland	June 27, 2017
303	Scarborough	Cumberland	August 23, 2013
304	Wiscasset	Lincoln	February 13, 2020
305	Farmington	Franklin	July 2, 2018
306	Belfast	Waldo	July 23, 2020
307	Bangor	Penobscot	September 18, 2013
308	Belgrade	Kennebec	March 1, 2021
309	Gardiner	Kennebec	March 1, 2021
310	Windham	Cumberland	May 29, 2001
312	Lewiston	Androscoggin	November 19, 2007
313	Waterville	Kennebec	June 14, 2007
314	Waterville	Kennebec	February 27, 1999
315	Boothbay Harbor	Lincoln	August 5, 2008
316	Madawaska	Aroostook	November 20, 1998
317	Portland	Cumberland	May 1, 2002
318	Portland	Cumberland	April 23, 2001
319	Brunswick	Cumberland	October 13, 1999
320	Livermore Falls	Androscoggin	October 6, 2003
321	Portland	Cumberland	October 13, 1999
322	Belfast	Waldo	November 20, 1998
323	Belfast	Waldo	October 11, 1997
324	Sanford	York	
325	Limestone	Aroostook	
326	Castine	Hancock	
327	Bradford	Penobscot	
328	Limestone	Aroostook	
329	Portland	Cumberland	May 18, 1998
330	Lewiston	Androscoggin	October 8, 2008
331	Portland	Cumberland	October 17, 2011
332	Portland	Cumberland	May 10, 1999
333	Lewiston	Androscoggin	August 7, 2003
334	Bass Harbor	Hancock	
335	Stonington	Hancock	
336	Buckfield	Oxford	
337	York	York	July 22, 1999
338	Belfast	Waldo	
339	Lebanon	York	January 10, 1996
340	Kingfield	Franklin	January 27, 2004
341	Newport	Penobscot	October 11, 1997
342	Morrill	Waldo	
343	Abbot	Piscataquis	October 11, 1997
344	Lewiston	Androscoggin	
345	Mechanic Falls	Androscoggin	
346	Mechanic Falls	Androscoggin	
347	Portland	Cumberland	August 20, 2000
348	Deer Isle	Hancock	
349	Greenville	Piscataquis	June 22, 2010
350	East Boothbay	Lincoln	October 11, 1997
351	York	York	September 11, 1994
352	Portland	Cumberland	July 27, 2016
353	Lisbon Falls	Androscoggin	
354	Thomaston	Knox	
355	Newport	Penobscot	October 13, 1999
356	Brewer	Penobscot	July 22, 1999
357	Rumford	Oxford	November 20, 1998
358	Portland	Cumberland	May 5, 2009
359	Sedgwick	Hancock	
360	Ogunquit	York	February 8, 2013
361	Ogunquit	York	
362	Smithfield	Somerset	
363	York	York	
364	Rumford	Oxford	
365	Benedicta	Penobscot	
366	Vinalhaven	Knox	
367	Deer Isle	Hancock	
368	Newport	Penobscot	
369	Rumford	Oxford	
370	Portland	Cumberland	October 28, 2008
371	Phippsburg	Sagadahoc	
372	St. George	Knox	
373	Brunswick	Cumberland	January 25, 1998
374	Blue Hill	Hancock	
375	Sabattus	Androscoggin	
376	Lewiston	Androscoggin	August 20, 2000
377	Winthrop	Kennebec	
378	Portland	Cumberland	May 18, 1998
379	Garland	Penobscot	
380	Wiscasset	Lincoln	November 20, 1998
381	Hanover	Oxford	October 13, 1999
382	Freedom	Waldo	
383	Windham	Cumberland	January 10, 2017
384	South Berwick	York	
385	Bangor	Penobscot	November 26, 2008
386	Bath	Sagadahoc	January 10, 1996
387	Portland	Cumberland	February 14, 2018
388	Sumner	Oxford	
389	Georgetown	Sagadahoc	
390	Rockland	Knox	January 6, 2009
391	Biddeford	York	March 20, 2006
392	Andover	Oxford	
393	South Paris	Oxford	August 14, 1998
394	Milford	Penobscot	
395	Winthrop	Kennebec	
396	Scarborough	Cumberland	May 10, 1999
397	Norridgewock	Somerset	
398	Fort Kent	Aroostook	
399	Skowhegan	Somerset	November 20, 1998
400	Portland	Cumberland	March 27, 2005
401	Bangor	Penobscot	November 30, 2016
402	Lewiston	Androscoggin	February 10, 2009
403	Lincoln	Penobscot	January 6, 2006
404	Kenduskeag	Penobscot	November 13, 2009
405	Portland	Cumberland	July 25, 2017
406	Brunswick	Cumberland	January 27, 2009
407	Lisbon Falls	Androscoggin	July 27, 2004
408	Portland	Cumberland	May 10, 1999
409	Portland	Cumberland	July 22, 1999
410	East Millinocket	Penobscot	March 4, 2021
412	Ellsworth	Hancock	January 26, 2012
413	Biddeford	York	April 12, 2021
414	Houlton	Aroostook	October 20, 2021
415	Portland	Cumberland	July 22, 1999
416	Pittsfield	Somerset	November 20, 1998
417	Freeport	Cumberland	November 23, 2011
418	Rumford	Oxford	October 13, 1999
419	Brunswick	Cumberland	January 14, 2022
420	Portland	Cumberland	December 7, 2009
421	Winterport	Waldo	March 8, 2019
422	Sullivan	Hancock	
423	Biddeford	York	July 22, 1999
424	Madison	Somerset	March 13, 2013
425	Mars Hill	Aroostook	
426	Clinton	Kennebec	
427	Baileyville	Washington	
428	Gray	Cumberland	
429	Mars Hill	Aroostook	
430	Augusta	Kennebec	August 20, 2000
431	Skowhegan	Somerset	February 27, 1999
432	Sanford	York	April 1, 1997
433	Bangor	Penobscot	August 20, 2000
434	Jonesboro	Washington	
435	Ashland	Aroostook	
436	Madawaska	Aroostook	May 10, 1999
437	Albion	Kennebec	
438	Kittery	York	January 10, 1996
439	Kittery	York	January 10, 1996
440	Lewiston	Androscoggin	October 15, 1996
441	Augusta	Kennebec	
442	Bath	Sagadahoc	
443	Bath	Sagadahoc	
444	Eagle Lake	Aroostook	
445	South China	Kennebec	
446	Augusta	Kennebec	April 1, 1997
447	Millinocket	Penobscot	January 14, 2000
448	Danforth	Washington	
449	Brunswick	Cumberland	September 12, 2005
450	Portland	Cumberland	October 15, 1996
451	Kittery	York	January 25, 1998
452	Hiram	Oxford	
453	Fairfield	Somerset	
454	Calais	Washington	
455	Washburn	Aroostook	
456	Danforth	Washington	
457	Sanford	York	
458	Augusta	Kennebec	July 1, 1996
459	Sanford	York	July 6, 1997
460	Sullivan	Hancock	
461	Oxford	Oxford	
462	Augusta	Kennebec	October 11, 1997
463	Oakfield	Aroostook	
464	Portland	Cumberland	January 25, 1998
465	Oakland	Kennebec	
466	Rockland	Knox	December 1, 2014
467	Kennebunk	York	January 25, 1998
468	Biddeford	York	
469	Bucksport	Hancock	
470	Camden	Knox	August 20, 2000
471	Portland	Cumberland	January 25, 1998
472	Fort Fairfield	Aroostook	
473	Fort Fairfield	Aroostook	
474	Skowhegan	Somerset	
475	Kittery	York	January 10, 1996
476	Fort Fairfield	Aroostook	
477	Acton	York	January 10, 1996
478	Brewer	Penobscot	February 27, 1999
479	Ellsworth	Hancock	May 18, 1998
480	Augusta	Kennebec	November 23, 2011
481	Brunswick	Cumberland	April 29, 2020
482	Portland	Cumberland	October 13, 1999
483	Columbia Falls	Washington	
484	Van Buren	Aroostook	May 10, 1999
485	Augusta	Kennebec	August 14, 1998
486	Newry	Oxford	
487	Pittsfield	Somerset	
488	Easton	Aroostook	
489	Portland	Cumberland	March 3, 2006
490	Sanford	York	
491	Farmington	Franklin	January 25, 1998
492	Caribou	Aroostook	
493	Caribou	Aroostook	
494	Biddeford	York	August 23, 2012
495	Belgrade	Kennebec	
496	Caribou	Aroostook	
497	Addison	Washington	
498	Caribou	Aroostook	
499	Hollis	York	
500	Jay	Franklin	December 6, 2011
501	Harrison	Cumberland	February 8, 2012
502	Kennebunk	York	August 5, 2008
503	Scarborough	Cumberland	November 23, 2011
504	Brunswick	Cumberland	September 16, 2004
505	Belfast	Waldo	February 13, 2008
506	Limerick	York	September 6, 2018
507	Rumford	Oxford	May 23, 2012
509	Waterville	Kennebec	May 8, 2008
510	Scarborough	Cumberland	August 20, 2000
512	Augusta	Kennebec	January 14, 2000
513	Lewiston	Androscoggin	February 28, 2007
514	Lewiston	Androscoggin	October 13, 1999
515	South Paris	Oxford	January 14, 2000
516	Wilton	Franklin	October 31, 2018
517	Portland	Cumberland	December 6, 2011
518	Portland	Cumberland	September 28, 2007
519	Southwest Harbor	Hancock	February 16, 2018
520	Lewiston	Androscoggin	August 8, 2012
521	Houlton	Aroostook	January 10, 1996
522	Brunswick	Cumberland	January 16, 2001
523	Portland	Cumberland	July 23, 2001
524	Leeds	Androscoggin	
525	Monroe	Lincoln	
526	Swan's Island	Hancock	
527	South Paris	Oxford	
528	Patten	Penobscot	
529	Bremen	Lincoln	
530	Augusta	Kennebec	September 11, 2012
531	Lewiston	Androscoggin	May 21, 2020
532	Houlton	Aroostook	
533	Andover	Oxford	
534	Rockwood	Somerset	
535	Portland	Cumberland	September 17, 2019
536	Portland	Cumberland	October 3, 2014
537	Eddington	Penobscot	
538	Monticello	Aroostook	
539	Oxford	Oxford	
540	Presque Isle	Aroostook	August 14, 1998
541	Portland	Cumberland	July 1, 1996
542	Rockland	Knox	January 25, 1998
543	St. Agatha	Aroostook	
544	Portland	Cumberland	February 19, 2020
545	Roxbury	Oxford	
546	Harrington	Washington	
547	Vassalboro	Kennebec	
548	Searsport	Waldo	
549	Alna	Lincoln	
550	Portland	Cumberland	February 20, 2018
551	Presque Isle	Aroostook	January 25, 1998
552	Portland	Cumberland	February 11, 1995
553	Portland	Cumberland	May 10, 1999
554	Presque Isle	Aroostook	November 20, 1998
556	Portland	Cumberland	May 11, 2006
557	Augusta	Kennebec	
558	Portland	Cumberland	November 17, 2014
559	Lincoln	Penobscot	April 1, 2019
560	Portland	Cumberland	November 23, 2016
561	Bangor	Penobscot	
562	Dixfield	Oxford	
563	Damariscotta	Lincoln	
564	Dover-Foxcroft	Piscataquis	
565	Sorrento	Hancock	
566	North Anson	Somerset	
567	Stockton Springs	Waldo	
568	Thorndike	Waldo	
569	Kennebunk	York	June 3, 2015
570	Bangor	Penobscot	June 20, 2006
571	Biddeford	York	January 14, 2000
572	Windham	Cumberland	September 19, 2014
573	Bangor	Penobscot	
574	Portland	Cumberland	August 14, 1998
575	Portland	Cumberland	August 14, 1998
576	Lewiston	Androscoggin	
577	Lewiston	Androscoggin	July 16, 2002
578	Farmington	Franklin	October 13, 1999
579	Boothbay Harbor	Lincoln	May 27, 2015
580	Portland	Cumberland	October 31, 2000
581	Orono	Penobscot	
582	Gardiner	Kennebec	
583	Harrison	Cumberland	
584	Aurora	Hancock	
585	Temple	Oxford	
586	Newcastle	Lincoln	
587	Norridgewock	Somerset	
588	Gardiner	Kennebec	
589	Liberty	Kennebec	
590	Biddeford	York	June 30, 2001
591	Portland	Cumberland	August 20, 2000
592	Augusta	Kennebec	February 11, 1995
593	Rockland	Knox	October 11, 1997
594	Rockland	Knox	
595	Harrison	Cumberland	January 10, 1996
596	Rockland	Knox	
597	Canton	Oxford	
598	Columbia Falls	Washington	November 20, 1998
600	Portland	Cumberland	February 1, 2019
601	Lewiston	Androscoggin	November 11, 2020
602	Biddeford	York	March 27, 2005
604	Kennebunk	York	February 14, 2005
605	Bangor	Penobscot	December 10, 2007
606	York	York	November 7, 2012
607	Brunswick	Cumberland	June 21, 2006
608	Sanford	York	January 3, 2005
610	Ellsworth	Hancock	November 16, 2005
612	Skowhegan	Somerset	March 30, 2006
613	Portland	Cumberland	July 2, 2014
614	Skowhegan	Somerset	September 11, 2012
615	Portland	Cumberland	August 4, 2002
616	Waterville	Kennebec	August 27, 2012
618	Portland	Cumberland	August 4, 2002
619	Portland	Cumberland	May 16, 2008
620	Augusta	Kennebec	May 10, 1999
621	Augusta	Kennebec	
622	Augusta	Kennebec	
623	Augusta	Kennebec	
624	Augusta	Kennebec	
625	Parsonsfield	Cumberland	
626	Augusta	Kennebec	
627	Naples	Cumberland	
628	New Portland	Somerset	
629	Augusta	Kennebec	October 11, 1997
630	York	York	April 29, 2013
631	Brewer	Penobscot	February 11, 1995
632	Portland	Cumberland	April 1, 1997
633	Boothbay Harbor	Lincoln	
634	Norridgewock	Somerset	
635	North Anson	Somerset	
636	Sanford	York	
637	Limington	York	
638	Aurora	Hancock	
639	Phillips	Franklin	
640	Lisbon Falls	Androscoggin	November 19, 2019
641	Wells	York	January 10, 1996
642	Steep Falls	Cumberland	
643	Solon	Somerset	
644	South Bristol	Lincoln	
645	Wilton	Franklin	
646	Wells	York	
647	Bridgton	Cumberland	
648	Steep Falls	Cumberland	February 11, 1995
649	Waterville	Kennebec	January 25, 1998
650	Portland	Cumberland	May 18, 1998
651	Sanford	York	October 15, 1996
652	New Vineyard	Franklin	
653	Portland	Cumberland	May 18, 1998
654	Skowhegan	Somerset	
655	Raymond	Cumberland	
656	Richmond	Sagadahoc	February 24, 2010
657	Gray	Cumberland	
658	Springvale	York	January 10, 1996
659	Bangor	Penobscot	February 15, 2002
660	Waterville	Kennebec	November 3, 2005
661	Portland	Cumberland	March 23, 2010
662	Portland	Cumberland	January 30, 2004
663	The Forks	Somerset	
664	Ellsworth	Hancock	July 4, 1995
665	Bryant Pond	Oxford	
666	Bowdoinham	Sagadahoc	
667	Ellsworth	Hancock	
668	Jackman	Somerset	
669	Ellsworth	Hancock	May 10, 1999
670	Stratton	Franklin	January 4, 2001
671	Portland	Cumberland	April 15, 1996
672	Solon	Somerset	
674	West Paris	Oxford	
675	Steep Falls	Cumberland	
676	North Berwick	York	
677	New Harbor	Lincoln	
678	Phillips	Franklin	
679	Pittsfield	Somerset	May 10, 1999
680	Waterville	Kennebec	May 10, 1999
681	Portland	Cumberland	January 10, 1996
682	Damariscotta	Lincoln	April 6, 2015
683	Harmony	Somerset	
684	Strong	Franklin	
685	Readfield	Kennebec	
686	Eliot	York	August 14, 1998
687	Wiscasset	Lincoln	August 18, 2006
688	Pownal	Cumberland	
689	Lewiston	Androscoggin	May 10, 1999
690	Kittery	York	April 12, 2019
691	Rockland	Knox	April 1, 1997
692	Waterville	Kennebec	January 14, 2000
693	Naples	Cumberland	
694	Monticello	Aroostook	June 13, 2000
695	Monson	Piscataquis	
696	Madison	Somerset	
697	Lovell	Oxford	
698	Berwick	York	January 10, 1996
699	Portland	Cumberland	June 30, 2001
701	Rockland	Knox	May 10, 2001
702	Bucksport	Hancock	May 1, 2006
703	Kittery	York	April 2, 2008
704	Berwick	York	April 2, 2008
705	Lewiston	Androscoggin	February 16, 2018
706	Camden	Knox	November 12, 2002
707	Augusta	Kennebec	September 17, 2018
708	Skowhegan	Somerset	December 31, 2018
709	Portland	Cumberland	February 16, 2018
710	Biddeford	York	January 20, 2006
712	Portland	Cumberland	January 9, 2002
713	Lewiston	Androscoggin	March 27, 2005
714	Gray	Cumberland	October 19, 2007
715	Berwick	York	March 26, 2008
716	Oakland	Kennebec	August 18, 2006
717	Sangerville	Piscataquis	November 20, 1998
718	Waldoboro	Lincoln	February 4, 1994
719	Sanford	York	September 23, 2021
720	Brunswick	Cumberland	
721	Brunswick	Cumberland	
722	Morrill	Lincoln	
723	Millinocket	Penobscot	
724	Farmingdale	Kennebec	
725	Brunswick	Cumberland	
726	Pembroke	Washington	
727	Hollis	York	
728	Madawaska	Aroostook	
729	Brunswick	Cumberland	
730	Scarborough	Cumberland	May 29, 2001
731	Medway	Penobscot	November 20, 1998
732	West Enfield	Penobscot	
733	Lubec	Washington	
734	Islesboro	Waldo	
735	Bangor	Penobscot	August 20, 2000
736	Mattawamkeag	Penobscot	
737	Richmond	Sagadahoc	
738	Springfield	Penobscot	
739	Norway	Oxford	May 10, 2001
740	Lewiston	Androscoggin	May 18, 1998
741	Portland	Cumberland	February 11, 1995
742	Fairfield	Somerset	May 8, 2017
743	Norway	Oxford	
744	Norway	Oxford	April 15, 1996
745	Brewer	Penobscot	
746	East Millinocket	Penobscot	
747	Portland	Cumberland	July 19, 2012
748	South Berwick	York	January 10, 1996
749	Portland	Cumberland	June 30, 2001
750	Portland	Cumberland	September 11, 1994
751	Brunswick	Cumberland	January 10, 1996
752	Kittery Point	York	March 3, 2001
753	Lewiston	Androscoggin	
754	Lewiston	Androscoggin	
755	Lewiston	Androscoggin	October 11, 1997
756	Portland	Cumberland	September 11, 1994
757	Oakfield	Aroostook	
758	Portland	Cumberland	
759	Portland	Cumberland	
760	Presque Isle	Aroostook	October 11, 1997
761	Portland	Cumberland	
762	Presque Isle	Aroostook	
763	Lincolnville	Waldo	
764	Presque Isle	Aroostook	
765	Wytopitlock	Aroostook	
766	Peaks Island	Cumberland	
767	Portland	Cumberland	
768	Presque Isle	Aroostook	
769	Presque Isle	Aroostook	
770	Portland	Cumberland	
771	Portland	Cumberland	July 6, 1997
772	Portland	Cumberland	
773	Portland	Cumberland	
774	Portland	Cumberland	
775	Portland	Cumberland	
776	Portland	Cumberland	
777	Lewiston	Androscoggin	
778	Farmington	Franklin	
779	Farmington	Franklin	September 11, 1994
780	Portland	Cumberland	
781	Portland	Cumberland	
782	Lewiston	Androscoggin	
783	Lewiston	Androscoggin	
784	Lewiston	Androscoggin	
785	Union	Knox	
786	Lewiston	Androscoggin	
787	Standish	Cumberland	
788	Brookton	Washington	
789	Lincolnville	Waldo	
790	Waldoboro	Lincoln	August 18, 2006
791	Portland	Cumberland	
792	Portland	Cumberland	
793	Limerick	York	
794	Lincoln	Penobscot	
795	Lewiston	Androscoggin	
796	Princeton	Washington	
797	Portland	Cumberland	
798	Brunswick	Cumberland	September 11, 1994
799	Cape Elizabeth	Cumberland	
800	Portland	Cumberland	January 22, 2019
801	Bar Harbor	Hancock	May 1, 2006
802	Dover-Foxcroft	Piscataquis	July 26, 2006
803	Bridgton	Cumberland	August 18, 2006
804	Windham	Cumberland	June 22, 2020
805	Portland	Cumberland	October 3, 2012
806	Sanford	York	May 30, 2013
807	Portland	Cumberland	April 17, 2002
808	Portland	Cumberland	November 15, 2013
809	Portland	Cumberland	January 2, 2008
810	Portland	Cumberland	October 29, 2021
812	Ellsworth	Hancock	October 30, 2007
813	Ellsworth	Hancock	June 18, 2019
814	Bangor	Penobscot	July 6, 2020
815	Biddeford	York	December 9, 2019
816	Augusta	Kennebec	May 20, 2020
817	Old Town	Penobscot	October 13, 1999
818	Portland	Cumberland	November 20, 1998
819	Portland	Cumberland	January 23, 2018
820	Old Town	Penobscot	September 17, 2018
821	Portland	Cumberland	
822	Portland	Cumberland	
823	Portland	Cumberland	
824	Bethel	Oxford	
825	Orrington	Penobscot	
826	Greenbush	Penobscot	July 4, 1995
827	Old Town	Penobscot	
828	Portland	Cumberland	
829	Cumberland	Cumberland	
830	Waterville	Kennebec	July 23, 2020
831	Portland	Cumberland	July 4, 1995
832	Waldoboro	Lincoln	
833	Harpswell	Cumberland	
834	Fort Kent	Aroostook	
835	Portland	Cumberland	February 4, 1994
836	Stoneham	Oxford	
837	Brunswick	Cumberland	April 23, 2001
838	Portland	Cumberland	July 6, 1997
839	Gorham	Cumberland	
841	Brunswick	Cumberland	October 11, 1997
842	Portland	Cumberland	July 4, 1995
843	Etna	Penobscot	
844	Brunswick	Cumberland	July 8, 2010
845	Washington	Knox	
846	Yarmouth	Cumberland	
847	Yarmouth	Cumberland	January 25, 1998
848	Levant	Penobscot	
849	Kennebunk	York	October 23, 2020
850	Sanford	York	September 17, 2007
851	Portland	Cumberland	January 10, 1996
852	Brewer	Penobscot	July 1, 1996
853	Eastport	Washington	
854	Westbrook	Cumberland	
855	Oakland	Kennebec	December 2, 2019
856	Westbrook	Cumberland	
857	Westbrook	Cumberland	October 11, 1997
858	Skowhegan	Somerset	February 11, 1995
859	Waterville	Kennebec	August 14, 1998
860	Farmington	Franklin	May 31, 2006
861	Waterville	Kennebec	September 11, 1994
862	Hampden	Penobscot	
863	Vinalhaven	Knox	
864	Stratton	Franklin	
865	Freeport	Cumberland	
866	Orono	Penobscot	
867	North Haven	Knox	
868	Van Buren	Aroostook	
869	Freeport	Cumberland	
870	Portland	Cumberland	
871	Portland	Cumberland	
872	Waterville	Kennebec	
873	Waterville	Kennebec	
874	Portland	Cumberland	
875	Bryant Pond	Oxford	
876	Guilford	Piscataquis	
877	Waterville	Kennebec	
878	Falmouth	Cumberland	
879	South Portland	Cumberland	
880	Portland	Cumberland	December 4, 2020
881	Bangor	Penobscot	
882	Wiscasset	Lincoln	
883	Scarborough	Cumberland	
884	Levant	Penobscot	
885	Scarborough	Cumberland	
886	Hope	Knox	February 9, 2021
887	Westbrook	Cumberland	October 13, 1999
888	South Portland	Cumberland	October 3, 2018
889	Orono	Penobscot	October 13, 1999
890	South Paris	Oxford	November 20, 1998
891	Freeport	Cumberland	April 16, 2001
892	Windham	Cumberland	
893	Windham	Cumberland	
894	Windham	Cumberland	October 13, 1999
895	Saint David	Aroostook	
896	New Sweden	Aroostook	
897	Livermore Falls	Androscoggin	
898	Madawaska	Aroostook	March 31, 2021
899	Portland	Cumberland	January 16, 2003
900	South Portland	Cumberland	January 22, 2019
901	Bar Harbor	Hancock	May 31, 2019
902	Bucksport	Hancock	January 11, 2006
904	Calais	Washington	November 20, 1998
907	Bangor	Penobscot	August 22, 2006
910	South Portland	Cumberland	December 4, 2020
914	Sanford	York	November 4, 2002
915	Biddeford	York	November 4, 2002
916	Lewiston	Androscoggin	November 4, 2002
917	Bangor	Penobscot	November 4, 2002
918	Augusta	Kennebec	November 4, 2002
921	Brunswick	Cumberland	
922	Bangor	Penobscot	April 22, 2010
923	North Vassalboro	Kennebec	
924	Dexter	Penobscot	
925	Lovell	Oxford	
926	New Gloucester	Cumberland	
928	Stoneham	Oxford	
929	Gorham	Cumberland	
930	Belfast	Waldo	August 14, 1998
931	Readfield	Kennebec	November 20, 1998
933	Monmouth	Kennebec	
934	Old Orchard Beach	York	
935	Fryeburg	Oxford	
937	Old Orchard Beach	York	May 18, 1998
938	Hartland	Somerset	
939	Portland	Cumberland	September 25, 2001
941	Bangor	Penobscot	
942	Bangor	Penobscot	
943	Milo	Piscataquis	
944	Brewer	Penobscot	
945	Bangor	Penobscot	July 2, 2019
946	Greene	Androscoggin	
947	Bangor	Penobscot	
948	Unity	Waldo	
949	Brewer	Penobscot	May 18, 1998
951	Bangor	Penobscot	April 7, 2008
952	Calais	Washington	March 1, 2002
955	Lewiston	Androscoggin	October 14, 2021
956	Portland	Cumberland	September 5, 2008
957	South Berwick	York	October 29, 2007
962	Orono	Penobscot	February 16, 2018
963	Winter Harbor	Hancock	
965	Brownville	Piscataquis	
966	Hebron	Oxford	
967	Kennebunkport	York	
968	Anson	Kennebec	
973	Bangor	Penobscot	
974	Bangor	Penobscot	February 27, 1999
975	Rockland	Knox	November 20, 1998
976	Portland		
977	Sanford	York	April 3, 2019
985	Kennebunk	York	
987	Augusta	Kennebec	October 11, 2021
989	Bangor	Penobscot	
990	Bangor	Penobscot	
991	Bangor	Penobscot	October 15, 1996
992	Bangor	Penobscot	May 10, 1999
993	Windsor	Kennebec	
994	Kittery	York	March 23, 2015
995	Old Orchard Beach	York	September 23, 2021
997	Monson	Piscataquis	
998	Poland	Androscoggin	
999	Limestone	Aroostook	

Maine area codes: 207
	North: 367/418/581, 428/506	
West: 603, 468/819/873	207	East: 428/506
	South: Atlantic Ocean	
New Brunswick area codes: 506/428
New Hampshire area codes: 603
Quebec area codes: 367/418/581, 354/450/579, 263/438/514, 468/819/873
