= Hope, Maine =

- Town
- Seal

- Location in Knox County and the state of Maine.
- Coordinates: 44°14′35″N 69°11′20″W
- Country: United States
- State: Maine
- County: Knox
- Villages: Hope; South Hope

Government
  - Type: Town Meeting-Council–manager

Area
  - Total: 23.88 sq mi (61.85 km^{2})
  - Land: 21.96 sq mi (56.88 km^{2})
  - Water: 1.92 sq mi (4.97 km^{2})
- Elevation: 541 ft (165 m)

Population (2020)
  - Total: 1,698
  - Density: 77/sq mi (29.9/km^{2})
- Time zone: UTC-5 (Eastern (EST))
  - Summer (DST): UTC-4 (EDT)
- ZIP code: 04847
- Area code: 207
- FIPS code: 23-33840
- GNIS feature ID: 582524
- Website: www.hopemaine.org

Hope is a town in Knox County, Maine, United States. The population was 1,698 at the 2020 census.

== History ==
=== Early European settlement ===
European settlement of the area began in the 1780s. The land was initially part of a larger grant system, with the Twenty Associates becoming proprietors of land that would eventually encompass Camden, Hope, Appleton, Montville, and part of Liberty beginning in 1768. The area was organized as Barretstown Plantation, named after Charles Barrett, who owned significant portions of the land.

=== Incorporation ===
The process of incorporation was delayed due to conflicts between settlers and absentee landowners. Initial petitions for incorporation began in 1795, but were opposed by proprietors who owned unsold lots and wished to avoid taxation. Hope was finally incorporated as a town on June 23, 1804, formed from Barretstown Plantation.

The town participated in Maine's separation from Massachusetts. Town records show that while earlier votes opposed separation, the final vote on July 26, 1819, favored separation. Hope sent a delegate to the Constitutional Convention in Portland in October 1819, prior to Maine achieving statehood in 1820.

=== Territorial changes ===
Hope's boundaries changed significantly in the 19th century. Beginning around 1800, residents in the western portion of town petitioned for separation. On February 7, 1843, approximately one-third of Hope's territory, including about half of its assessed valuation, was set off to help form the town of Appleton.

=== 19th-century economy ===
By the 1880s, Hope had developed manufacturing centers in Hope Village and South Hope. According to the 1886 Gazetteer of Maine, Hope Village produced "boots and shoes, sleigh-tops, cider vinegar, staves, etc." while South Hope manufactured "sash, doors and furniture, lumber, staves and heads, carriages, mowing-machines, meal and flour." The town's economy was supported by water-powered mills along local streams and ponds.

=== Population trends ===
Hope's population peaked at 1,107 residents in 1850, then declined until 1920, remained relatively stable until 1970, and has grown significantly since then. The town's population more than tripled between 1970 and 2010, reflecting broader demographic changes in coastal Maine communities.

== Geography ==
According to the United States Census Bureau, the town has a total area of 23.88 square miles (61.85 km^{2}), of which 21.96 square miles (56.88 km^{2}) is land and 1.92 square miles (4.97 km^{2}) is water. Principal bodies of water include part of Megunticook Lake, Alford Lake, Hobbs Pond (266 acres), Lermond Pond (173 acres), Fish Pond (112 acres), Mansfield Pond (41 acres) and Lily Pond (29 acres).

The town is crossed by Maine State Routes 17, 105 and 235. It is bordered by Searsmont on the north, Lincolnville on the east, Camden and Rockport on the southeast, Union on the west and Appleton on the northwest.

== Demographics ==
Historical population
Census	Pop.	Note	%±
1810	787		—
1820	1,179		49.8%
1830	1,541		30.7%
1840	1,770		14.9%
1850	1,108		−37.4%
1860	1,064		−4.0%
1870	907		−14.8%
1880	830		−8.5%
1890	641		−22.8%
1900	599		−6.6%
1910	497		−17.0%
1920	424		−14.7%
1930	464		9.4%
1940	524		12.9%
1950	504		−3.8%
1960	525		4.2%
1970	500		−4.8%
1980	730		46.0%
1990	1,017		39.3%
2000	1,310		28.8%
2010	1,536		17.3%
2020	1,698		10.5%
U.S. Decennial Census

=== 2010 census ===
As of the census of 2010, there were 1,536 people, 603 households, and 444 families residing in the town. The population density was 69.9 inhabitants per square mile (27.0/km^{2}). There were 805 housing units at an average density of 36.7 per square mile (14.2/km^{2}). The racial makeup of the town was 96.8% White, 0.1% African American, 0.8% Native American, 0.7% Asian, 0.1% from other races, and 1.6% from two or more races. Hispanic or Latino of any race were 1.0% of the population.

There were 603 households, of which 34.3% had children under the age of 18 living with them, 61.0% were married couples living together, 9.6% had a female householder with no husband present, 3.0% had a male householder with no wife present, and 26.4% were non-families. 18.6% of all households were made up of individuals, and 5.3% had someone living alone who was 65 years of age or older. The average household size was 2.54 and the average family size was 2.91.

The median age in the town was 43.2 years. 23.8% of residents were under the age of 18; 5.1% were between the ages of 18 and 24; 24.2% were from 25 to 44; 34% were from 45 to 64; and 12.9% were 65 years of age or older. The gender makeup of the town was 48.9% male and 51.1% female.

=== 2000 census ===
As of the census of 2000, there were 1,310 people, 513 households, and 380 families residing in the town. The population density was 60.0 inhabitants per square mile (23.2/km^{2}). There were 687 housing units at an average density of 31.5 per square mile (12.2/km^{2}). The racial makeup of the town was 98.63% White, 0.15% African American, 0.31% Native American, 0.23% Asian, 0.15% from other races, and 0.53% from two or more races. Hispanic or Latino of any race were 0.84% of the population.

There were 513 households, out of which 35.5% had children under the age of 18 living with them, 62.8% were married couples living together, 7.8% had a female householder with no husband present, and 25.9% were non-families. 21.1% of all households were made up of individuals, and 6.2% had someone living alone who was 65 years of age or older. The average household size was 2.54 and the average family size was 2.94.

In the town, the population was spread out, with 26.9% under the age of 18, 4.2% from 18 to 24, 32.8% from 25 to 44, 27.1% from 45 to 64, and 9.0% who were 65 years of age or older. The median age was 38 years. For every 100 females, there were 97.3 males. For every 100 females age 18 and over, there were 91.2 males.

The median income for a household in the town was $42,273, and the median income for a family was $45,781. Males had a median income of $33,125 versus $26,850 for females. The per capita income for the town was $24,385. About 4.7% of families and 6.5% of the population were below the poverty line, including 6.6% of those under age 18 and 8.4% of those age 65 or over.

== Education ==
For grades Kindergarten to 8, Hope is part of School Union 69. Danielle Fagonde is the principal and Kate Clark is the superintendent. Hope Elementary School was one of two schools in the state of Maine to receive the title of National Blue Ribbon School in 2012.

For grades 9 to grades 12, Hope is part of the Five Town Community School District, which operates Camden Hills Regional High School. Maria Libby is the Superintendent.
