= Liberty, Maine =

Town in Maine, United States

- Town
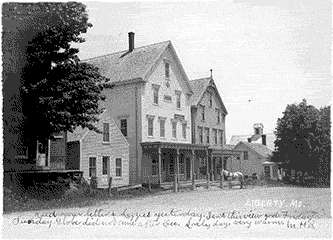
- Masonic Building on Main Street, c. 1904

- Seal

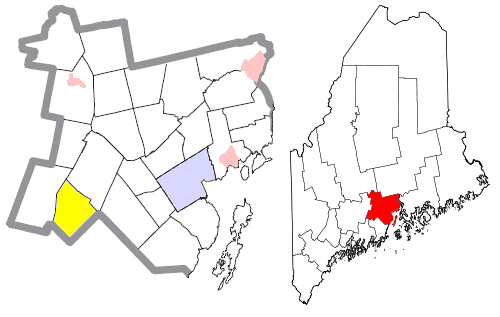
- Location of Liberty (in yellow) in Waldo County and the state of Maine
- Coordinates: 44°22′25″N 69°21′34″W
- Country: United States
- State: Maine
- County: Waldo

Area
  - Total: 28.40 sq mi (73.56 km^{2})
  - Land: 26.00 sq mi (67.34 km^{2})
  - Water: 2.40 sq mi (6.22 km^{2})
- Elevation: 742 ft (226 m)

Population (2020)
  - Total: 934
  - Density: 36/sq mi (13.9/km^{2})
- Time zone: UTC-5 (Eastern (EST))
  - Summer (DST): UTC-4 (EDT)
- ZIP code: 04949
- Area code: 207
- FIPS code: 23-39055
- GNIS feature ID: 582555
- Website: www.libertymaine.us

Liberty is a town in Waldo County, Maine, United States. The population was 934 at the 2020 census.

== History ==
The first European (English) people moved into the area in and around Liberty in the late 18th century. The first settlement was then known as Davistown Plantation, which is incorporated into neighboring Montville in the early 19th century. Mills in Liberty produced materials that were used in the shipbuilding industry that thrived in nearby coastal towns, such as Waldoboro, during the early 19th century.

In 1827, Liberty separated from Montville and was incorporated as a town.

The middle to late 19th century saw a decline in population and goods produced. This correlates with the decline of the shipbuilding industry.

== Geography ==
According to the United States Census Bureau, the town has a total area of 28.40 square miles (73.56 km^{2}), of which 26.00 sq mi (67.34 km^{2}) is land and 2.40 sq mi (6.22 km^{2}) is water.

Liberty is served by Maine State Routes 3, 220, and 173. It is bordered on the north by Montville, on the east by Searsmont, on the southeast by Appleton, on the southwest by Washington and on the west by Palermo.

Liberty is home to Lake St. George State Park.

== Demographics ==
Historical population
Census	Pop.	Note	%±
1830	676		—
1840	895		32.4%
1850	1,116		24.7%
1860	1,095		−1.9%
1870	907		−17.2%
1880	970		6.9%
1890	835		−13.9%
1900	737		−11.7%
1910	650		−11.8%
1920	571		−12.2%
1930	516		−9.6%
1940	499		−3.3%
1950	497		−0.4%
1960	458		−7.8%
1970	515		12.4%
1980	694		34.8%
1990	790		13.8%
2000	927		17.3%
2010	913		−1.5%
2020	934		2.3%
U.S. Decennial Census

=== 2010 census ===
As of the census of 2010, there were 913 people, 395 households, and 259 families living in the town. The population density was 35.1 inhabitants per square mile (13.6/km^{2}). There were 718 housing units at an average density of 27.6 per square mile (10.7/km^{2}). The racial makeup of the town was 97.3% White, 0.2% African American, 0.7% Native American, 0.1% Pacific Islander, 0.1% from other races, and 1.6% from two or more races. Hispanic or Latino of any race were 0.4% of the population.

There were 395 households, of which 26.1% had children under the age of 18 living with them, 50.9% were married couples living together, 9.1% had a female householder with no husband present, 5.6% had a male householder with no wife present, and 34.4% were non-families. 29.4% of all households were made up of individuals, and 9.4% had someone living alone who was 65 years of age or older. The average household size was 2.31 and the average family size was 2.83.

The median age in the town was 47.2 years. 21.7% of residents were under the age of 18; 5.4% were between the ages of 18 and 24; 20.1% were from 25 to 44; 38.2% were from 45 to 64; and 14.7% were 65 years of age or older. The gender makeup of the town was 51.5% male and 48.5% female.

== Notable person ==
- Susan Longley, former state legislator
