= Lincolnville, Maine =

Town in Maine, United States

- Town
- Centennial celebration in 1902

- Seal

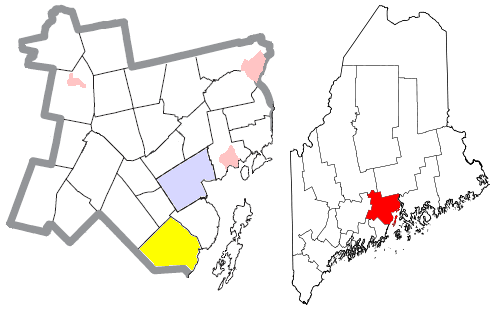
- Location of Lincolnville (in yellow) in Waldo County and the state of Maine
- Coordinates: 44°16′12″N 69°04′08″W
- Country: United States
- State: Maine
- County: Waldo
- Incorporated: 1802

Area
  - Total: 43.65 sq mi (113.05 km^{2})
  - Land: 37.34 sq mi (96.71 km^{2})
  - Water: 6.31 sq mi (16.34 km^{2})
- Elevation: 151 ft (46 m)

Population (2020)
  - Total: 2,312
  - Density: 62/sq mi (23.9/km^{2})
- Time zone: UTC-5 (Eastern (EST))
  - Summer (DST): UTC-4 (EDT)
- ZIP code: 04849
- Area code: 207
- FIPS code: 23-39755
- GNIS feature ID: 582561
- Website: town.lincolnville.me.us

Lincolnville is a town in Waldo County, Maine, United States. The population was 2,312 at the 2020 census. Lincolnville is the mainland terminal for Maine State Ferry Service transport to Islesboro.

== History ==
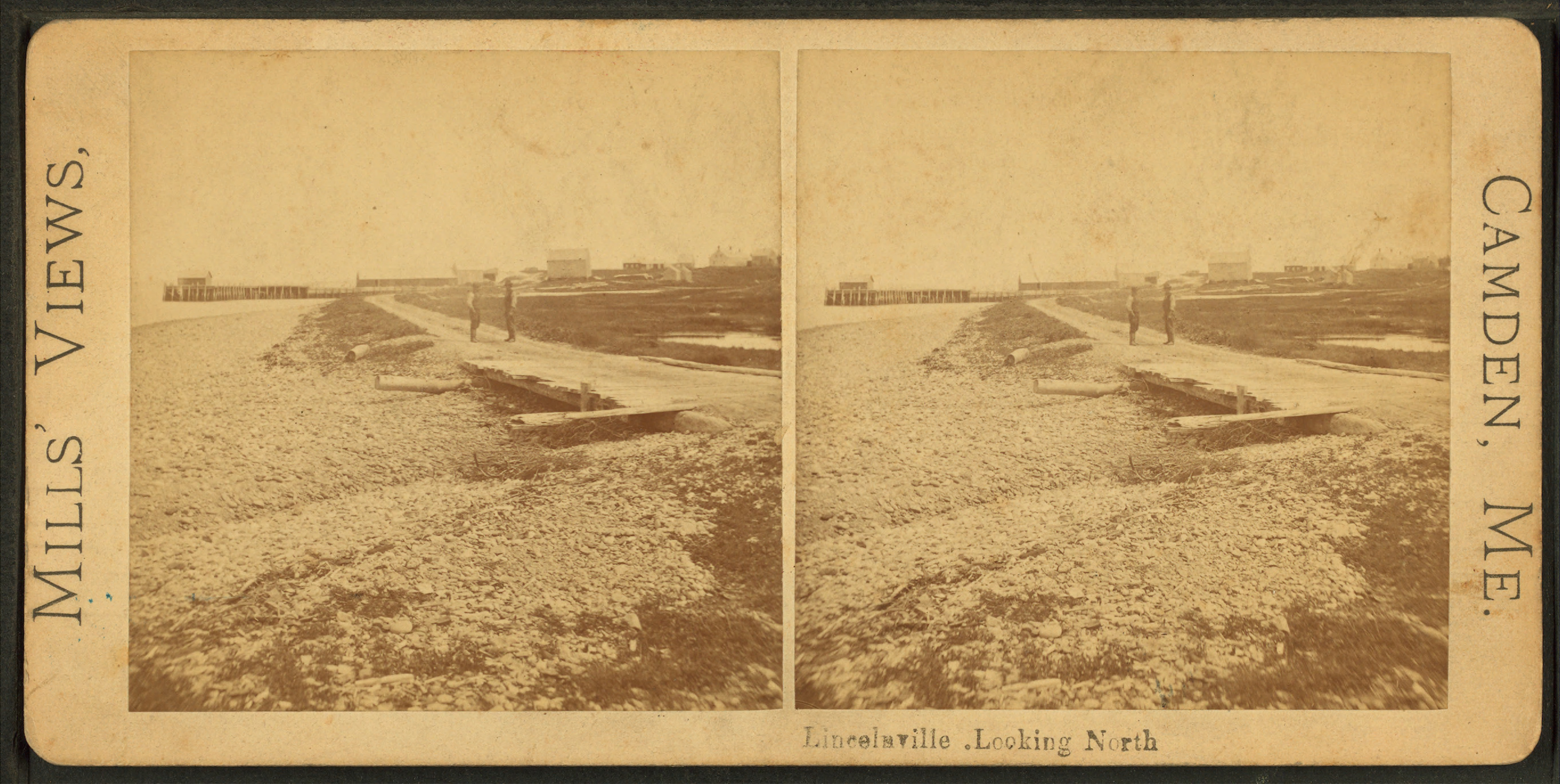
Stereoscopic view of Lincolnville shoreline c. 1880

Approximately 10,000 years ago, a glacier covered the area to a depth of several thousand feet, carving irregular landforms that survive today. The earliest artifact of European origin was fragments of a 1650–1660 clay pipe, probably a trade good with the native population. First settled in 1770 by Nathan Knight, the town was incorporated in 1802 from Canaan and Ducktrap plantations. It was named for General Benjamin Lincoln, a Revolutionary War General—second-in-command to George Washington at Yorktown—and friend of Henry Knox.

In an 1807 vote to separate from Massachusetts, it was one of three coastal communities to push for separation (with Bath and Brunswick).

On October 22, 1844, local members of the Millerite sect climbed Megunticook Mountain to await the end of the world and the Second Coming. The event was dubbed the Great Disappointment. They hadn't prepared for the winter, so other Lincolnville residents housed them to help them survive the winter months.

The first school in Lincolnville was a three-sided log cabin behind Nathan Knight's home with a perpendicular ledge for a fourth wall; the ledge served to support a blackboard.

Lamb School was one of the other earlier schools in Lincolnville owned by the Lamb family. It closed in 1912. A sign put up by the Lincolnville Historical Society is now in its place.

Over the years, the population continued to grow until it was incorporated in 1802. A bicentennial celebration was celebrated by the town in 2002.

== Geography ==
According to the United States Census Bureau, the town has a total area of 43.65 square miles (113.05 km^{2}), of which 37.34 square miles (96.71 km^{2}) is land and 6.31 square miles (16.34 km^{2}) is water. Located along the western side of Penobscot Bay, Lincolnville is drained by the Ducktrap River. Principal bodies of water include Megunticook Lake, Norton Pond (123 acres), Coleman Pond (225 acres), Moody Pond (61 acres), and Levenseller Pond (34 acres).

The town is served by U.S. Route 1, and Maine State Routes 173, 52, and 235. It is bordered by Belmont on the north, Northport on the northeast, Penobscot Bay on the east, Camden on the south, Hope on the west and Searsmont on the northwest.

== Demographics ==
Historical population
Census	Pop.	Note	%±
1810	1,013		—
1820	1,294		27.7%
1830	1,702		31.5%
1840	2,048		20.3%
1850	2,174		6.2%
1860	2,075		−4.6%
1870	1,900		−8.4%
1880	1,705		−10.3%
1890	1,361		−20.2%
1900	1,223		−10.1%
1910	1,020		−16.6%
1920	811		−20.5%
1930	818		0.9%
1940	892		9.0%
1950	881		−1.2%
1960	867		−1.6%
1970	955		10.1%
1980	1,414		48.1%
1990	1,809		27.9%
2000	2,042		12.9%
2010	2,164		6.0%
2020	2,312		6.8%
U.S. Decennial Census

=== 2010 census ===
As of the census of 2010, there were 2,164 people, 959 households, and 635 families living in the town. The population density was 58.0 inhabitants per square mile (22.4/km^{2}). There were 1,465 housing units at an average density of 39.2 per square mile (15.1/km^{2}). The racial makeup of the town was 97.9% White, 0.3% African American, 0.3% Native American, 0.4% Asian, 0.1% Pacific Islander, and 0.9% from two or more races. Hispanic or Latino people of any race were 0.8% of the population.

There were 959 households, of which 25.4% had children under the age of 18 living with them, 55.1% were married couples living together, 6.9% had a female householder with no husband present, 4.3% had a male householder with no wife present, and 33.8% were non-families. 26.1% of all households were made up of individuals, and 10.1% had someone living alone who was 65 years of age or older. The average household size was 2.26 and the average family size was 2.70.

The median age in the town was 47.5 years. 19.7% of residents were under the age of 18; 5.2% were between the ages of 18 and 24; 21.5% were from 25 to 44; 35.8% were from 45 to 64; and 17.7% were 65 years of age or older. The gender makeup of the town was 50.8% male and 49.2% female.

=== 2000 census ===
As of the census of 2000, there were 2,042 people, 846 households, and 605 families living in the town. The population density was 54.6 inhabitants per square mile (21.1/km^{2}). There were 1,272 housing units at an average density of 34.0 per square mile (13.1/km^{2}). The racial makeup of the town was 98.78% White, 0.05% African American, 0.15% Native American, 0.20% Asian, 0.05% Pacific Islander, 0.39% from other races, and 0.39% from two or more races. Hispanic or Latino people of any race were 0.83% of the population.

There were 846 households, out of which 31.7% had children under the age of 18 living with them, 61.7% were married couples living together, 6.5% had a female householder with no husband present, and 28.4% were non-families. 22.9% of all households were made up of individuals, and 9.5% had someone living alone who was 65 years of age or older. The average household size was 2.41 and the average family size was 2.82.

In the town, the population was spread out, with 23.1% under the age of 18, 4.9% from 18 to 24, 28.2% from 25 to 44, 29.8% from 45 to 64, and 14.0% who were 65 years of age or older. The median age was 42 years. For every 100 females, there were 99.8 males. For every 100 females age 18 and over, there were 98.0 males.

The median income for a household in the town was $42,273, and the median income for a family was $48,500. Males had a median income of $32,006 versus $28,077 for females. The per capita income for the town was $21,621. About 7.0% of families and 9.1% of the population were below the poverty line, including 9.8% of those under age 18 and 9.5% of those age 65 or over.

== Education ==
Lincolnville is part of School Union 69 (with the Towns of Hope and Appleton), which operates the Lincolnville Central School (LCS), for grades preK–8 and is part of the Five Town Consolidated School District (with the towns of Hope, Appleton, Rockport and Camden), which operates Camden Hills Regional High School. Shawn Carlson is the Superintendent of School Union 69 and Maria Libby is the Superintendent of the Five Town CSD. The principal of LCS is Justin Bennett as of the 2023-2024 school year.

== Notable people ==
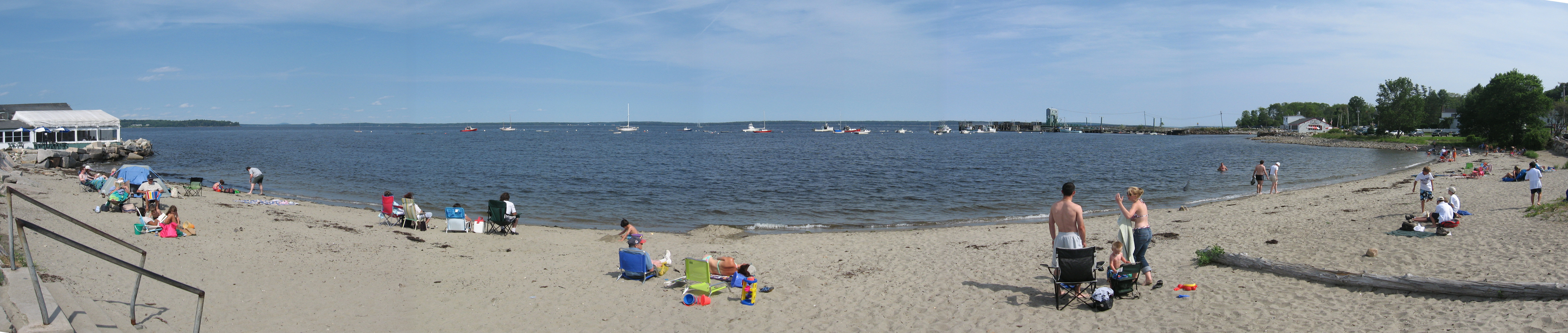
Panoramic view of Lincolnville Beach, July 31, 2006

- Tim Boetsch, mixed martial artist
- John Burstein, actor, creator and performer of Slim Goodbody
- Jon Fishman, drummer, Phish
- Elizabeth Hand, author
- Alex Katz, artist
- Eli Pariser, political activist
- Levi Rackliffe, California state treasurer
- Bidu Sayão, opera soprano
- Neil Welliver, artist
