= Knox County, Maine =

County in Maine, United States

- County
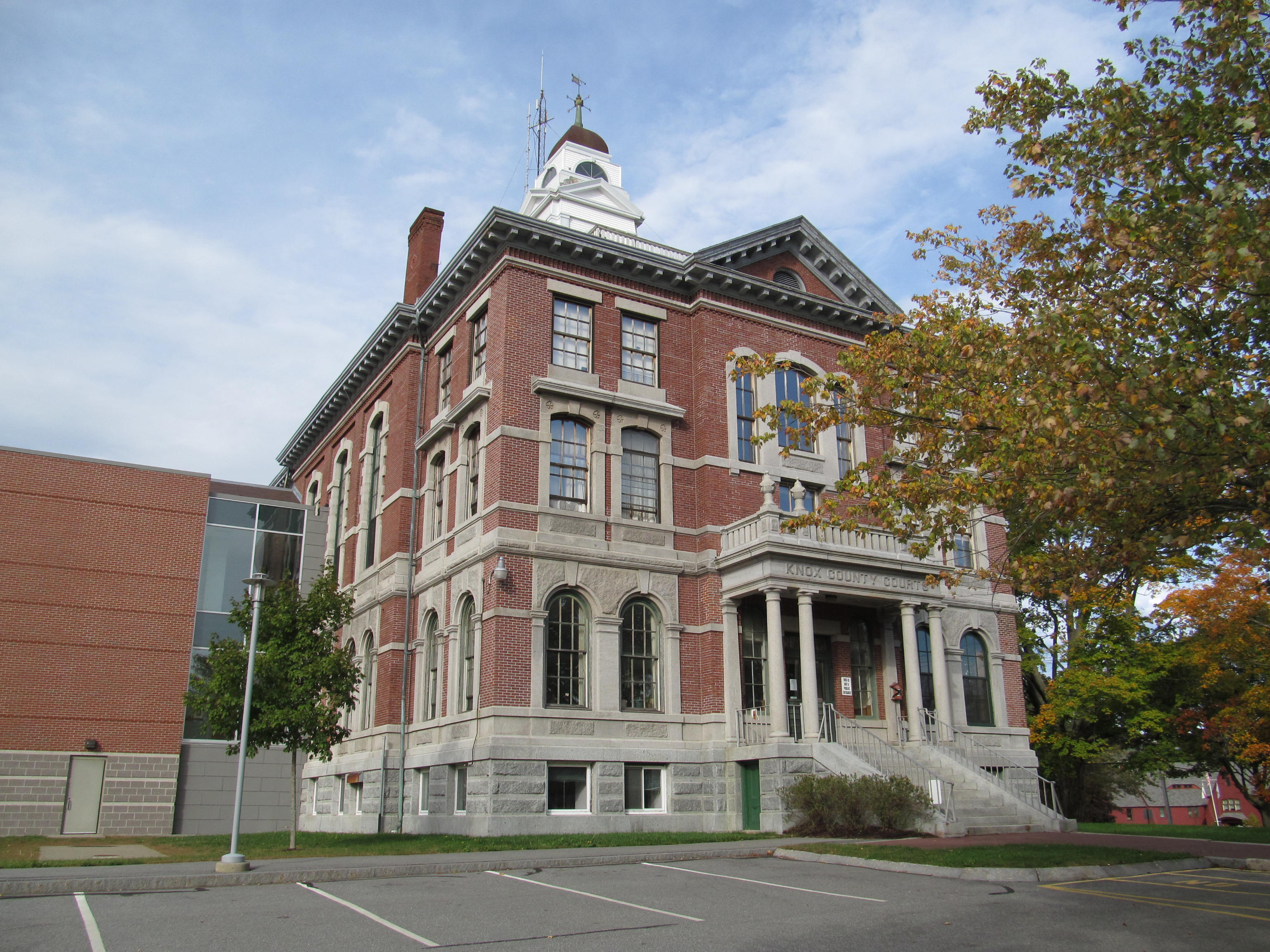
- Knox County Courthouse

- Logo

- Location within the U.S. state of Maine
- Coordinates: 44°07′12″N 69°07′40″W
- Country: United States
- State: Maine
- Founded: April 1, 1860
- Named for: Henry Knox
- Seat: Rockland
- Largest city: Rockland

Area
  - Total: 1,144 sq mi (2,960 km^{2})
  - Land: 365 sq mi (950 km^{2})
  - Water: 779 sq mi (2,020 km^{2}) 68%

Population (2020)
  - Total: 40,607
  - Estimate (2025): 41,117 ▲
  - Density: 111/sq mi (43.0/km^{2})
- Time zone: UTC−5 (Eastern)
  - Summer (DST): UTC−4 (EDT)
- Congressional district: 1st
- Website: knoxcountymaine.gov

Knox County is a county located in the state of Maine, United States. As of the 2020 census, the population was 40,607. Its county seat is Rockland. The county is named for Revolutionary War general and Secretary of War Henry Knox, who lived in the county from 1795 until his death in 1806. The county was established on April 1, 1860, and is the most recent county to be created in Maine. It was carved from parts of Waldo and Lincoln counties. The Union Fair, started in 1868, began as the efforts of the North Knox Agricultural and Horticultural Society.

== Geography ==
According to the U.S. Census Bureau, the county has a total area of 1,144 square miles (2,960 km^{2}), of which 365 square miles (950 km^{2}) is land and 779 square miles (2,020 km^{2}) (68%) is water. It is the second-smallest county in Maine by land area while Androscoggin County is second-smallest by total area. It was originally part of the Waldo Patent.

At an elevation of 1,381 feet above sea level, Mount Megunticook, located in Camden Hills State Park, is the highest point in the county. It ranks 10th in elevation out of Maine's 16 county high points. It is a popular hiking destination in the region.

=== National protected areas ===
- Franklin Island National Wildlife Refuge
- Seal Island National Wildlife Refuge

== Demographics ==
Historical population
| Census | Pop. | Note | %± |
|---|---|---|---|
| 1860 | 32,716 | | — |
| 1870 | 30,823 | | −5.8% |
| 1880 | 32,863 | | 6.6% |
| 1890 | 31,473 | | −4.2% |
| 1900 | 30,406 | | −3.4% |
| 1910 | 28,981 | | −4.7% |
| 1920 | 26,245 | | −9.4% |
| 1930 | 27,693 | | 5.5% |
| 1940 | 27,191 | | −1.8% |
| 1950 | 28,121 | | 3.4% |
| 1960 | 28,575 | | 1.6% |
| 1970 | 29,013 | | 1.5% |
| 1980 | 32,941 | | 13.5% |
| 1990 | 36,310 | | 10.2% |
| 2000 | 39,618 | | 9.1% |
| 2010 | 39,736 | | 0.3% |
| 2020 | 40,607 | | 2.2% |
| 2025 (est.) | 41,117 | ▲ | 1.3% |
U.S. Decennial Census; 1790–1960 1900–1990; 1990–2000 2010–2016

=== 2020 census ===
As of the 2020 census, the county had a population of 40,607, with 17.0% of residents under the age of 18, 26.9% aged 65 or older, and a median age of 49.6 years; for every 100 females there were 99.3 males and 97.4 males for every 100 females age 18 and over. 35.8% of residents lived in urban areas and 64.2% in rural areas.

The racial makeup of the county was 92.9% White, 0.7% Black or African American, 0.4% American Indian and Alaska Native, 0.6% Asian, 0.0% Native Hawaiian and Pacific Islander, 0.7% from some other race, and 4.7% from two or more races. Hispanic or Latino residents of any race comprised 1.7% of the population.

There were 17,883 households in the county, of which 22.3% had children under the age of 18 living with them and 27.2% had a female householder with no spouse or partner present. About 31.7% of all households were made up of individuals and 16.6% had someone living alone who was 65 years of age or older.

There were 24,255 housing units, of which 26.3% were vacant. Among occupied housing units, 74.5% were owner-occupied and 25.5% were renter-occupied. The homeowner vacancy rate was 1.5% and the rental vacancy rate was 9.0%.

Knox County, Maine – Racial and ethnic composition Note: the US Census treats Hispanic/Latino as an ethnic category. This table excludes Latinos from the racial categories and assigns them to a separate category. Hispanics/Latinos may be of any race.
| Race / Ethnicity (NH = Non-Hispanic) | Pop 2000 | Pop 2010 | Pop 2020 | % 2000 | % 2010 | % 2020 |
|---|---|---|---|---|---|---|
| White alone (NH) | 38,777 | 38,337 | 37,533 | 97.87% | 96.47% | 92.42% |
| Black or African American alone (NH) | 78 | 192 | 256 | 0.19% | 0.48% | 0.63% |
| Native American or Alaska Native alone (NH) | 86 | 136 | 139 | 0.21% | 0.34% | 0.34% |
| Asian alone (NH) | 141 | 184 | 250 | 0.35% | 0.46% | 0.61% |
| Pacific Islander alone (NH) | 3 | 5 | 18 | 0.00% | 0.01% | 0.04% |
| Other race alone (NH) | 15 | 23 | 144 | 0.03% | 0.05% | 0.35% |
| Mixed race or Multiracial (NH) | 293 | 522 | 1,595 | 0.73% | 1.31% | 3.92% |
| Hispanic or Latino (any race) | 225 | 337 | 672 | 0.56% | 0.84% | 1.65% |
| Total | 39,618 | 39,736 | 40,607 | 100.00% | 100.00% | 100.00% |

=== 2010 census ===
At the 2010 census, there were 39,736 people, 17,258 households, and 10,662 families living in the county. The population density was 108.8 inhabitants per square mile (42.0/km^{2}). There were 23,744 housing units at an average density of 65.0 units per square mile (25.1 units/km^{2}). The racial makeup of the county was 97.1% white, 0.5% black or African American, 0.5% Asian, 0.4% American Indian, 0.2% from other races, and 1.4% from two or more races. Those of Hispanic or Latino origin made up 0.8% of the population. In terms of ancestry, 31.3% were English, 19.0% were Irish, 12.8% were German, 6.9% were Scottish, and 5.9% were American.

Of the 17,258 households, 25.4% had children under the age of 18 living with them, 48.2% were married couples living together, 9.4% had a female householder with no husband present, 38.2% were non-families, and 31.0% of households were made up of individuals. The average household size was 2.22 and the average family size was 2.75. The median age was 46.2 years.

The median household income was $45,264 and the median family income was $55,830. Males had a median income of $40,712 versus $29,732 for females. The per capita income for the county was $25,291. About 7.9% of families and 12.5% of the population were below the poverty line, including 16.5% of those under age 18 and 9.8% of those age 65 or over.

=== 2000 census ===
At the 2000 census there were 39,618 people, 16,608 households, and 10,728 families living in the county. The population density was 108 people per square mile (42 people/km^{2}). There were 21,612 housing units at an average density of 59 per square mile (23/km^{2}). The racial makeup of the county was 98.28% White, 0.24% Black or African American, 0.22% Native American, 0.36% Asian, 0.01% Pacific Islander, 0.12% from other races, and 0.78% from two or more races. 0.57% of the population were Hispanic or Latino of any race. 25.4% were of English, 12.2% Irish, 11.7% United States or American, 7.5% German and 5.7% French ancestry. 97.1% spoke English and 1.5% French as their first language. Of the 16,608 households 28.30% had children under the age of 18 living with them, 52.20% were married couples living together, 9.00% had a female householder with no husband present, and 35.40% were non-families. 29.00% of households were one person and 12.70% were one person aged 65 or older. The average household size was 2.31 and the average family size was 2.83.

The age distribution was 22.40% under the age of 18, 6.30% from 18 to 24, 27.40% from 25 to 44, 26.70% from 45 to 64, and 17.20% 65 or older. The median age was 41 years. For every 100 females there were 95.20 males. For every 100 females age 18 and over, there were 93.00 males.

The median household income was $36,774 and the median family income was $43,819. Males had a median income of $30,704 versus $22,382 for females. The per capita income for the county was $19,981. About 6.40% of families and 10.10% of the population were below the poverty line, including 11.90% of those under age 18 and 8.00% of those age 65 or over.

== Politics ==
Knox County is a Democratic stronghold in presidential elections. Originally it favored the Republican Party, like most of the rest of Maine, but it began to trend Democratic starting in the 1990s, voting for every Democratic presidential candidate since 1992. In 2004, Democrat John Kerry won the county with a decisive 11-point majority, and in every election since then Democrats have carried the county by double-digit margins.

In 2012, Knox County voted 55% in favor of a measure to legalize same-sex marriage. It was one of two counties to vote for Democrat Sara Gideon in the 2020 Senate election.

=== Voter registration ===
Voter registration and party enrollment as of March 2024
| Democratic | 12,139 | 40.22% |
| Unenrolled | 8,436 | 27.95% |
| Republican | 8,117 | 26.89% |
| Green Independent | 1,065 | 3.53% |
| No Labels | 343 | 1.14% |
| Libertarian | 83 | 0.27% |
| Total | 30,183 | 100% |

United States presidential election results for Knox County, Maine
| Year | Republican | | Democratic | | Third party(ies) | |
| Year | No. | % | No. | % | No. | % |
|---|---|---|---|---|---|---|
| 1880 | 2,880 | 41.28% | 3,659 | 52.45% | 437 | 6.26% |
| 1884 | 2,819 | 46.50% | 2,364 | 39.00% | 879 | 14.50% |
| 1888 | 2,965 | 52.28% | 2,290 | 40.38% | 416 | 7.34% |
| 1892 | 2,321 | 46.23% | 2,136 | 42.54% | 564 | 11.23% |
| 1896 | 3,286 | 61.72% | 1,900 | 35.69% | 138 | 2.59% |
| 1900 | 2,762 | 48.76% | 2,765 | 48.81% | 138 | 2.44% |
| 1904 | 2,538 | 54.78% | 1,866 | 40.28% | 229 | 4.94% |
| 1908 | 2,228 | 50.04% | 1,932 | 43.40% | 292 | 6.56% |
| 1912 | 1,097 | 19.95% | 2,751 | 50.03% | 1,651 | 30.02% |
| 1916 | 2,211 | 37.82% | 3,434 | 58.74% | 201 | 3.44% |
| 1920 | 4,979 | 60.85% | 2,971 | 36.31% | 233 | 2.85% |
| 1924 | 4,919 | 69.99% | 1,770 | 25.18% | 339 | 4.82% |
| 1928 | 6,660 | 73.35% | 2,332 | 25.68% | 88 | 0.97% |
| 1932 | 6,169 | 55.28% | 4,765 | 42.70% | 225 | 2.02% |
| 1936 | 6,567 | 60.36% | 3,991 | 36.69% | 321 | 2.95% |
| 1940 | 6,530 | 60.76% | 4,197 | 39.05% | 20 | 0.19% |
| 1944 | 5,590 | 59.70% | 3,758 | 40.14% | 15 | 0.16% |
| 1948 | 5,374 | 72.67% | 1,924 | 26.02% | 97 | 1.31% |
| 1952 | 8,793 | 78.32% | 2,414 | 21.50% | 20 | 0.18% |
| 1956 | 8,866 | 81.32% | 2,037 | 18.68% | 0 | 0.00% |
| 1960 | 9,083 | 70.41% | 3,816 | 29.58% | 1 | 0.01% |
| 1964 | 4,404 | 38.53% | 7,022 | 61.43% | 4 | 0.03% |
| 1968 | 6,585 | 55.25% | 5,119 | 42.95% | 214 | 1.80% |
| 1972 | 8,478 | 70.19% | 3,601 | 29.81% | 0 | 0.00% |
| 1976 | 8,315 | 56.24% | 5,922 | 40.05% | 549 | 3.71% |
| 1980 | 7,631 | 48.98% | 5,732 | 36.79% | 2,218 | 14.24% |
| 1984 | 11,311 | 65.00% | 6,024 | 34.62% | 66 | 0.38% |
| 1988 | 10,156 | 57.54% | 7,343 | 41.60% | 151 | 0.86% |
| 1992 | 6,310 | 31.03% | 7,631 | 37.52% | 6,397 | 31.45% |
| 1996 | 6,192 | 32.79% | 8,839 | 46.81% | 3,852 | 20.40% |
| 2000 | 8,968 | 43.74% | 9,453 | 46.11% | 2,080 | 10.15% |
| 2004 | 10,103 | 43.46% | 12,690 | 54.59% | 454 | 1.95% |
| 2008 | 8,816 | 38.36% | 13,728 | 59.74% | 436 | 1.90% |
| 2012 | 8,248 | 37.38% | 13,223 | 59.92% | 596 | 2.70% |
| 2016 | 9,148 | 39.52% | 12,443 | 53.76% | 1,556 | 6.72% |
| 2020 | 9,982 | 38.79% | 15,110 | 58.72% | 642 | 2.49% |
| 2024 | 10,262 | 39.63% | 15,076 | 58.22% | 555 | 2.14% |

== Communities ==
=== City ===
- Rockland (county seat)

=== Towns ===
- Appleton
- Camden
- Cushing
- Friendship
- Hope
- Isle au Haut
- North Haven
- Owls Head
- Rockport
- Saint George
- South Thomaston
- Thomaston
- Union
- Vinalhaven
- Warren
- Washington

=== Plantation ===
- Matinicus Isle

=== Unorganized territories ===
- Criehaven
- Muscle Ridge Islands

=== Census-designated places ===
- Camden
- Thomaston

=== Other unincorporated villages ===
- Glen Cove
- Hibberts Corner
- Port Clyde
- West Rockport

== Public buildings ==
An addition to the Knox County Courthouse designed by Scott Simons Architects was completed in 2005. It is connected to an annex built in 1977 that is adjacent to the historic, original building that was finished in 1874.

== Education ==
K-12 school districts include:

- St. George Public Schools
- Regional School Unit 13
- School Administrative District 07
- School Administrative District 08
- Regional School Unit 40
- School Administrative District 65

There is also one secondary school district, Five Town Community School District, and the following elementary school districts:

- Appleton School District
- Hope School District
- School Administrative District 28

There is also the Knox Unorganized Territory. Unorganized territory is not in any municipality. The Maine Department of Education takes responsibility for coordinating school assignments in the unorganized territory.

== See also ==
- National Register of Historic Places listings in Knox County, Maine
- Historical United States Census totals for Knox County, Maine
