= Nathan G. Hichborn House =

Historic house in Maine, United States

- U.S. National Register of Historic Places
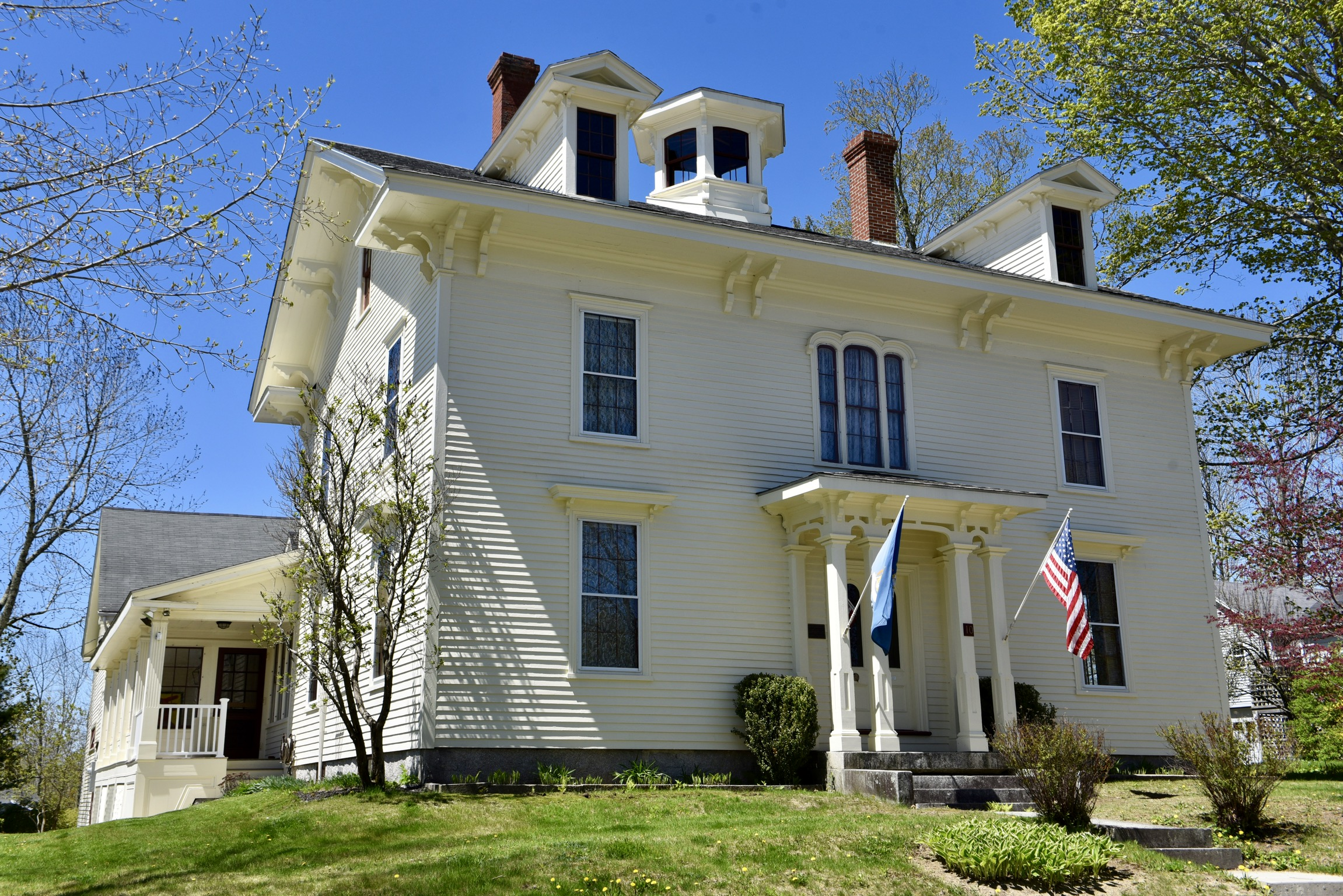

- Location within Maine Location within the United States
- Location: 10 Church St., Stockton Springs, Maine
- Coordinates: 44°29′25″N 68°51′29″W
- Area: less than one acre
- Built: 1850
- Architect: Alfred S. Biather
- Architectural style: Italianate
- NRHP reference No.: 88000392
- Added to NRHP: April 7, 1988

The Nathan G. Hichborn House is a historic house at 10 Church Street in Stockton Springs, Maine. Built in the 1850s, this Italianate structure is one of the community's more architecturally sophisticated buildings, and is notable as the home of Nathan Hichborn, a local shipbuilder and politician who was responsible for the town's separation from Prospect. The house was listed on the National Register of Historic Places in 1988.

== Description and history ==
Now the location of a Farm to Table restaurant, the Hichborn House is located in the village of Stockton Springs, just south of United States Route 1 and the Stockton Springs Community Church on the west side of Church Street. It is a 2 1/2-story wood-frame structure, with a hip roof, clapboard siding, and a stone foundation. The roof has broad eaves studded with paired brackets, has gabled dormers facing front, and is topped by an hexagonal cupola. The east-facing front facade is symmetrical, three bays wide, with its center entrance sheltered by a portico supported by clusters of chamfered square posts. A three-part window stands above the entrance, with a molded hood shaped to the window parts' curved tops. The interior of the house has well-preserved woodwork, and has faux-marbled slate fireplace surrounds in the downstairs parlors. An ell extends to the rear, joining the house to a carriage barn.

The house has traditionally been given a construction date of 1849, but its construction and styling suggest an 1850s date. The house was designed by Alfred Biather, an architect then based in Bangor, and was built for Nathan Griffin Hichborn, a local shipbuilder and politician. Hichborn was a prolific shipbuilder, turning out 42 ships over a 28-year period. He was instrumental in the construction of the nearby Stockton Springs Community Church, and led the effort to separate Stockton Springs from Prospect, which was successfully completed in 1857. Hichborn served in the state legislature and as state treasurer, and was a candidate for Governor of Maine on a temperance movement ticket.

== See also ==
- National Register of Historic Places listings in Waldo County, Maine
