= Waldo Patent =

Document granting title to 36,000 square miles of land in Maine, U.S.

The Waldo Patent, a letters patent also known as the Muscongus Patent or the Lincolnshire Patent, was a document granting title to 36 square miles (9,300 ha) of land in what is now the U.S. state of Maine. It is named variously for businessman Samuel Waldo, who eventually gained control of the patent, and for the Muscongus River, one of the grant's boundaries.

== History ==
In March 1630, John Beauchamp of London, England, and Thomas Leverett of Boston, England, obtained a grant of land from a company acting under the authority of the government of England.

This grant was first known as the Muscongus Patent from the Muscongus River that formed a part of the western boundary. From the seacoast, it extended northerly between Penobscot Bay and the Penobscot River on the east, and the Muscongus River on the west, to the line that now constitutes the southern boundary of the towns Hampden, Newburgh and Dixmont.

This grant or patent conveyed nothing but the right of exclusive trade with the Native Americans—perhaps the Penobscot or Abenaki peoples—for which a trading house was built and supplied with such articles of exchange as were necessary to successful traffic. Trade was carried on without interruption to the mutual advantage of the European-American settlers and natives until the opening of the first Indian Wars in 1675, a period of 45 years.

After 1675, the patent lay dormant until 1719 when Leverett's great-grandson, John Leverett, President of Harvard College, revived the claim and formed the Lincolnshire Proprietors, also known as the Ten Proprietors, so named for the ten shares distributed, one to each member. Samuel Waldo of Boston acquired a controlling interest in the patent in 1729 and it henceforward become known as the Waldo Patent.

General Samuel Waldo was proprietor of the Waldo Patent. He is said to have gone to Europe to recruit German immigrants to settle his 576,000 acre (2,331 km^{2}) grant, which included parts of what are now Waldo, Penobscot and Lincoln counties and all of Knox County, Maine, along with the islands within three miles of its border.

In 1759, Waldo accompanied the governor of the Province of Massachusetts Bay, Thomas Pownall, and his 400 men to help establish this site. To open the Penobscot River area to settlement, the governor selected Fort Point in Stockton Springs to build a breastwork and blockhouse. Called Fort Pownall, the fort included a trading post. But Waldo died on May 23 near present-day Bangor while exploring the northern reaches of his property. He was buried without monument at Fort Point. Ownership of the Waldo Patent then transferred to his heirs, who included the Fluckers of Boston. Lucy Flucker married Henry Knox, who served as a general in the American Revolutionary War, and the Knoxes eventually acquired most of the patent. Much of their land was eventually sold to William Bingham, leading those lands to become known as the Bingham Purchase.
