= Joseph Plumb Martin =

American soldier and memoir writer (1760–1850)

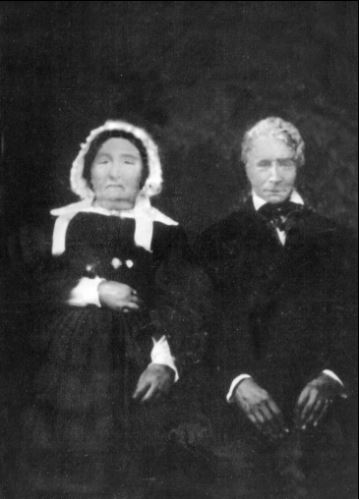
- Martin and wife, Lucy Clewley Martin, in a 19th century portrait painting, date unknown
- Born: November 21, 1760; Becket, Province of Massachusetts Bay
- Died: May 2, 1850 (aged 89); Stockton Springs, Maine
- Burial place: Sandy Point, Maine
- Military career
- Allegiance: United States
- Branch: Continental Army; Connecticut Militia
- Service years: 1776–1783
- Rank: Sergeant
- Service number: CT16333
- Conflicts: American Revolutionary War: Battle of Long Island (1776); Landing at Kip's Bay (1776); Battle of Harlem Heights (1776); Battle of White Plains (1776); Battle of Ridgefield (1777); Battle of Germantown (1777); Siege of Fort Mifflin (1777); Battle of Barren Hill (1778); Battle of Monmouth (1778); Siege of Yorktown (1781)

Joseph Plumb Martin (also spelled Joseph Plum Martin; November 21, 1760 – May 2, 1850) was a soldier in the Connecticut Militia and Continental Army during the American Revolutionary War, and was mustered out as a 23-year-old Sergeant in a Sapper company. His published narrative of his experiences, re-discovered in the 1950s, has become a valuable resource for historians in understanding the conditions of a common soldier of that era, as well as the battles in which Martin participated.

== Early life ==
Joseph Plumb Martin was born in Becket, Massachusetts on November 21, 1760, to the Reverend Ebenezer Martin and Susannah Plumb. At the age of seven, he was sent to live with his affluent grandparents in Milford, Connecticut. Because his family was well-to-do (his father studied at Yale), Martin was able to receive a well-rounded education, including reading and writing.

== Revolutionary War service ==
When Martin was 15, in 1775, he was eager to join the war effort following the Battles of Lexington and Concord. His grandparents initially opposed the idea, but agreed after Martin vowed to run away and join a naval ship as a privateer if he was not allowed to join. He joined the Connecticut Militia in June 1776 and was assigned duty in the New York City area, then under General George Washington's command, arriving just before the opening of the British Long Island Campaign. His first tour of duty ended in December 1776, and he returned home just prior to the Battles of Trenton and Princeton.

After a restless winter and spring back in Connecticut, the 16-year-old veteran enlisted in the Continental Army on April 22, 1777, signing on for the duration of the American Revolutionary War. He served with the 17th Continental Regiment under the command of General James Varnum.

Martin participated in such notable engagements as the Battle of Brooklyn, the Battle of White Plains, the siege of Fort Mifflin and the Battle of Monmouth. He encamped at Valley Forge, witnessed John Andre being escorted to his execution and was also present during the climactic Siege of Yorktown. He was assigned to the Light Infantry in 1778, attaining the rank of Corporal. In the summer of 1780, under Washington's order to form a Corps of Sappers and Miners, he was recommended by his superior officers to be a non-commissioned officer of this regiment, and in being selected, was promoted to Sergeant. Prior to Yorktown, the corps was responsible for digging the entrenchments for the Continental Army.

During the battle, they were also a vanguard for a regiment commanded by Alexander Hamilton, clearing the field of sharpened logs called abatis so that Hamilton's regiment could capture Redoubt #10.

== Postwar years ==
Martin was discharged from duty in June 1783, a few months before the Continental Army disbanded the following October. He taught in New York State for a year, and eventually settled on Maine's frontier, becoming one of the founders of the town of Prospect, near modern-day Stockton Springs. Over the years, he was known locally for being a farmer, selectman, Justice of the Peace and Town Clerk (the last position being held for over 25 years).

He married Lucy Clewley (born 1776) in 1794 with whom he had five children: Joseph (born 1799), Nathan and Thomas (twins, born 1803), James Sullivan (born 1810), and Susan (born 1812). He also wrote many stories and poems over the years, most famously a narrative of his experiences during the war in 1830, apparently sourced from a journal that he had kept, but that is now lost.

In 1794, he became involved in a bitter land dispute with land speculator Henry Knox, former Major-General in the Continental Army and Secretary of War under George Washington's administration as president. Knox claimed that he owned Martin's 100-acre (0.40 km^{2}) farm, as well as the surrounding 600,000 acres (2,400 km^{2}) in an area now known as Waldo County, Maine. Martin claimed this was not true, and that he had the right to farm the land.

In 1797, Knox's claim was upheld. Martin's 100-acre farm was valued by three commissioners: one appointed by the settlers, one by the proprietors, and the third by the first two. Martin's was appraised for the sum of $170, payable over six years in three installments either in cash or in farm products. He could not raise the money and begged Knox to allow him to keep the land. There is no evidence that Knox even acknowledged his plaintive letters and appeared to let him remain on the land. Plumb Martin farmed only eight acres of the original 100 he opted for. Knox died in 1806, never demanding payment from Plumb Martin. By 1811, his farmland was cut by half, and by 1818, when he appeared in the Massachusetts General Court with other Revolutionary War veterans to claim a war pension, he owned nothing.

In 1818, Martin's war pension was approved and he received $96 a year for the rest of his life. Still, other war veterans were fighting for what they were properly owed and, in an effort to further the cause of the veterans, Martin published his memoirs anonymously in 1830. It was not considered a success and mainly fell to the wayside, apparently lost to history. In 1836, a platoon of United States Light Infantry was marching through Prospect and discovered that Plumb Martin resided there. The platoon stopped outside of his house and fired a salute in honor of the Revolutionary War Hero.

== Death ==
Martin died on May 2, 1850, at the age of 89. He is buried with his wife at the Sandy Point Cemetery, outside of Stockton Springs, Maine.

== Joseph Plumb Martin's narrative ==
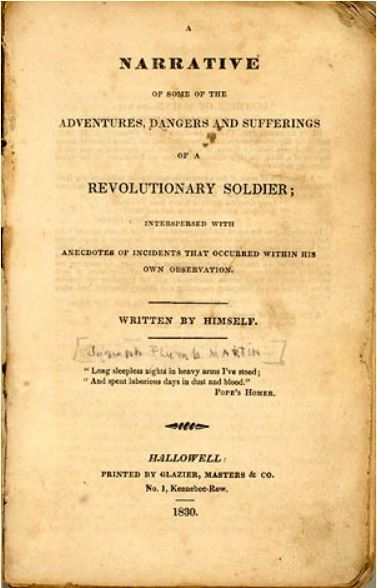
The first edition of Joseph Plumb Martin's American Revolutionary War memoirs published anonymously in an attempt to help other war veterans applying to receive their government pensions

Martin's narrative of the war has been frequently cited by scholars as an excellent primary source for the American Revolution. For most of the war, Martin was a private in the army, and his account does not involve the usual heroes of the Revolution. His narrative is considered one of the major primary sources for historians, researchers and re-enactors of the American Revolution.

Martin's narrative was originally published anonymously in 1830, at Hallowell, Maine, as A narrative of some of the adventures, dangers, and sufferings of a Revolutionary soldier, interspersed with anecdotes of incidents that occurred within his own observation. It has been republished in many forms, but was thought lost to history. In the mid-1950s, a first-edition copy of the narrative was found and donated to Morristown National Historical Park. The book was published again by Little, Brown in 1962, and with permission reprinted by Eastern National in 2006, in an edition edited by George F. Scheer under the title Private Yankee Doodle; as well as appearing as a volume in Series I of The New York Times' Eyewitness Accounts of the American Revolution in 1968. The current edition, published in 2001, is entitled A Narrative of a Revolutionary Soldier: Some of the Adventures, Dangers and Sufferings of Joseph Plumb Martin. Other current versions include a version adapted for children, entitled Yankee Doodle Boy and The Memoirs of a Revolutionary Soldier, and an annotated version entitled Private Yankee Doodle. His narrative is quoted in numerous works on the American Revolution, including those written by David McCullough and Robert Leckie.

Martin has been portrayed on various television documentaries/dramas: by Aaron Carter (in Liberty's Kids), Philip Seymour Hoffman (in the PBS series Liberty! The American Revolution), and Rick Schroder (in The American Revolution). First-edition copies of his narrative reside in the Library of Congress, the US Army Military History Institute at Carlisle, PA, as well as the collection of artifacts at Morristown National Historical Park. The Joseph Plumb Martin Trail, named in his honor, encircles Valley Forge National Historical Park in Pennsylvania.

== Bibliography ==
- Connecticut Historical Society (1901). Rolls and Lists of Connecticut Men in the Revolution. 1775–1783. Volume 8. Hartford, Connecticut.
- Johnston, Henry Phelps (1889). Record of Service of Connecticut Men in the I. War of the Revolution, II. War of 1812, III. Mexican War. Hartford, Connecticut: Adjutant-General's Office. ISBN 978-1101-44211-1.
- Martin, James Kirby, ed. (2012). Ordinary Courage: The Revolutionary War Adventures of Joseph Plumb Martin. with an essay "The Revolutionary War Soldier on Film" by Karen Guenther. Hoboken, New Jersey: John Wiley & Sons, Ltd. ISBN 978-1444351354.
- Martin, Joseph Plumb (2010). A Narrative of a Revolutionary Soldier: Some of the Adventures, Dangers and Sufferings of Joseph Plumb Martin. with an introduction by Thomas Fleming, and a new afterword by William Chad Stanley. New York: Signet Classics. ISBN 978-0451531582. "Joseph Plumb Martin."
- Mead, Philip (2011). "Adventures, Dangers and Sufferings: The Betrayals of Private Joseph Plumb Martin, Continental Soldier". In Young, Alfred F.; Nash, Gary B.; Raphael, Ann Ray (eds.). Revolutionary Founders: Rebels, Radicals, and Reformers in the Making of the Nation. New York: Alfred A. Knopf. pp. 117–134. ISBN 978-03072-7110-5.
- Raphael, Ray (2009). Founders: The People Who Brought You a Nation. New York: The New Press. ISBN 978-1595583277.
- Taylor, Alan (1990). Liberty Men and the Great Proprietors: The Revolutionary Settlement on the Maine Frontier, 1760-1820. Chapel Hill, North Carolina: University of North Carolina Press. ISBN 0807819093.
