= Nathan Griffin Hichborn =

American government official (1818–1874)

Nathan Griffin Hichborn (May 29, 1818 – November 30, 1874) was an American shipbuilder and government official who was Maine State Treasurer from 1865 to 1868 and was the Maine Temperance League's nominee in the 1869 Maine gubernatorial election. His home was added to the National Register of Historic Places in 1988.

== Early life ==
Hichborn was born in Stockton Springs, Maine (then part of Prospect, Maine and later known as Stockton) on May 29, 1818 to Henry and Desiah (Griffin) Hichborn. He was raised in the Universalist faith and helped lead the effort to get the Stockton Universalist Church built.

== Ship building ==
In 1846, Hichborn formed a shipbuilding business in present-day Stockton Springs. Hichborn completed 42 vessels during his lifetime, with work on a 43rd ship finishing shortly after his death. In 1853, the Hitchborn Yard finished construction on the Jacob Badger, a 1048-ton ship built for captain Everett Staples. It was the largest vessel constructed in the town until 1919. Other Hichborn ships included:

- California, a 181–ton brig built for captain Wilson Hichborn that was launched on October 7, 1846
- Alvarado, a 140–ton schooner built for captain Isaac Lampher that was launched on June 12, 1847
- William McGilvery a 198–ton schooner built for captain William Hichborn that was launched on November 20, 1847
- Sea Maid, a 212–ton brig built for captain T. M. Hichborn that was launched on November 28, 1848
- Benguela, a 212–ton brig built for captain Robert Hichborn that was launched on November 17, 1849
- S. I. Roberts, a 298–ton barque built for captain Robert Hichborn that was launched on October 30, 1852
- Tangent, a 198–ton brig owned by Hichborn and captained by Otis L. Harriman that was launched in 1853
- Lanzarote, a 191–ton brig built for captain Otis L. Harriman that was launched on June 8, 1853
- Lock Lama, a 570.15–ton ship built for captain, Wilson Hichborn that was launched in 1853
- M. J. Colcord, a 374–ton barque built for captain Josiah Colcord that was launched in 1855
- Windward, a 187.74–ton schooner built for captain Lewis M. Partridge that was on launched August 22, 1860 (Patridge and the Windward were captured by the Jefferson Davis the following year)
- Sylvan, a 137.33–ton schooner built for captain S. P. Blanchard that was launched on July 1, 1865
- Evanell, a 513.5–ton built built for captain William D. Colcord that was launched on December 15, 1868
- Sparkling Water a 319.56–ton brig built for captain, Robert Hichborn that was launched on July 9, 1869
- Selkirk, a 84–ton schooner built for captain William Fletcher that was launched on August 17, 1871
- Brigadier, a 310.67–ton schooner built for captain F. J. Norton that was launched on November 4, 1873
- J. R. Bodwell, a 169.72–ton schooner built for captain F. A. Otis that was launched on August 11, 1874

The final ship Hitchborn worked on was the Caprea, a 709.16–ton barque that was on the stocks at the time of his death and launched one month later.

== Politics ==
On December 9, 1845, the South Prospect Post Office was established and Hichborn was made its first postmaster. He served one year each in the Maine House of Representatives and Maine Senate. He was instrumental in separating Stockton Springs from Prospect, which was accomplished in 1857. From 1865 to 1868, he was Maine State Treasurer. In 1869, Hichborn, who was active in the temperance movement, was unanimously chosen at the state temperance convention to be the organization's candidate for Governor of Maine. He received 5% of the vote to Republican Joshua Chamberlain's 54% and Democrat Franklin Smith's 41%.

== Later life and death ==
In 1869, Hichborn was appointed president of the Penobscot Bay and River Railroad Company, which sought to build a line from Bangor to Rockland, where it would connect with the Knox and Lincoln Railroad.

In 1874, Hichborn fell ill with typhoid fever. He died on November 30, 1874 at his residence. At the time of his death, Hichborn was president of the Maine Shipbuilding Association and a trustee of the Westbrook Seminary and the Universalist Publishing House.
