= Bingham Purchase =

Historic tracts of land in Maine, U.S.

The Bingham Purchase refers to several tracts of land in the U.S. state of Maine, formerly owned by William Bingham.

These lands were granted to early colonizers in the 1630s, and became part of the larger Waldo Patent, named after Samuel Waldo, who acquired the land grants in 1720. In 1786, when Massachusetts (which then included Maine), disposed of large tracts of unsettled lands in Maine by lottery, William Bingham, a wealthy Philadelphia banker, drew several townships and purchased others, with a total area of one million acres (4,000 km^{2}). This first tract was in the south-east of Maine. General Henry Knox had signed a contract to buy another 1,000,000-acre (4,000 km^{2}) tract, in the west, but his duties as Secretary of War prevented his developing it, and Bingham took that over as well. The territory covered by these grants includes most of the then-undeveloped land between Penobscot Bay and Passamaquoddy Bay (which forms part of the boundary between Maine and the Canadian province of New Brunswick), and land along the Kennebec River.

Today, these lands are under the jurisdiction of the State of Maine. The term "the Bingham Purchase" is still occasionally used to refer to the geographical area where the lands were once situated.
