= Fort Point State Park =

State park in Waldo County, Maine

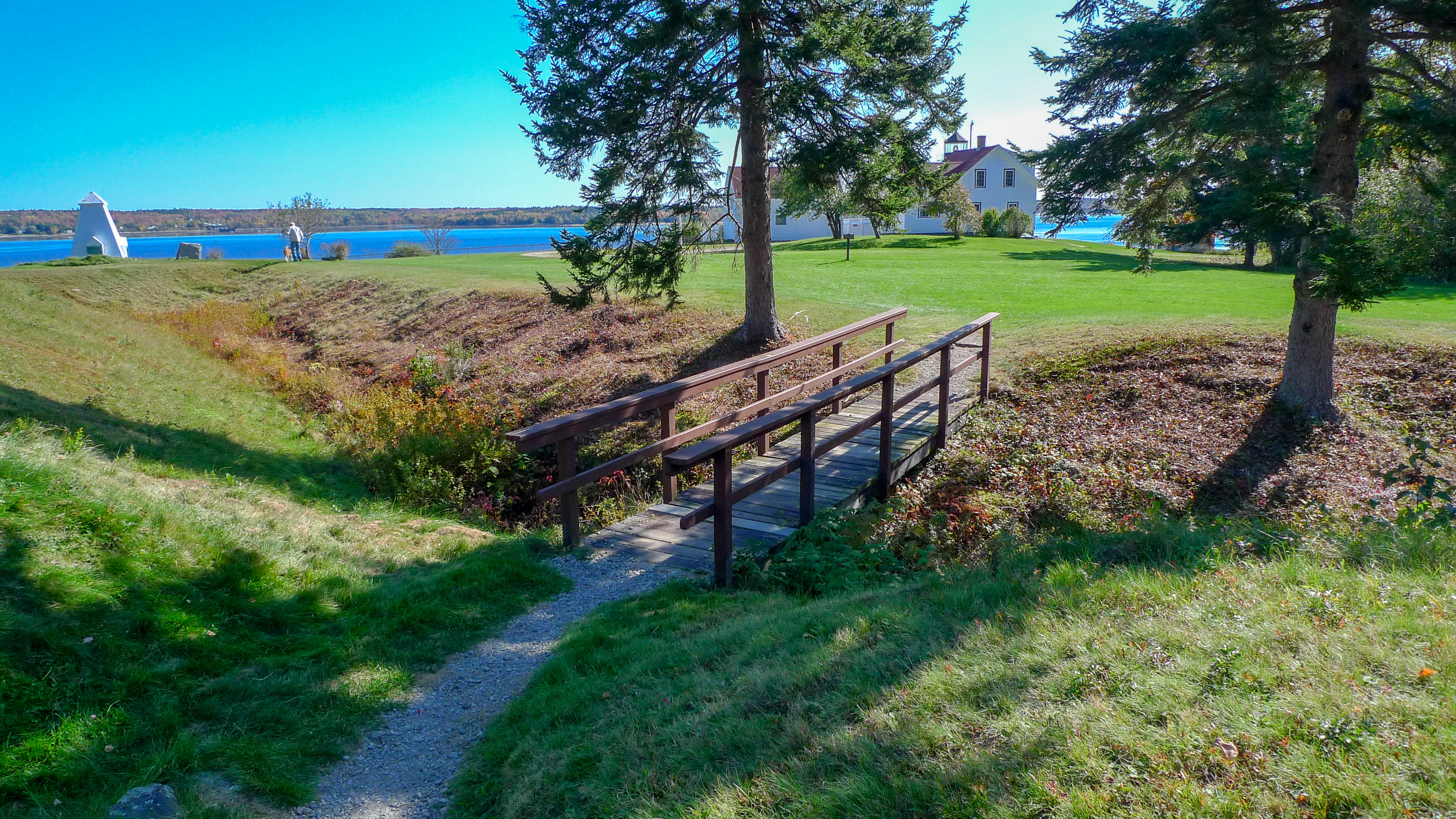
- Fort Point Light

- Location within Maine
- Interactive map of Fort Point State Park
- Location: Stockton Springs, Maine, United States
- Coordinates: 44°27′58″N 68°49′53″W
- Area: 156 acres (63 ha)
- Elevation: 33 ft (10 m)
- Established: 1974
- Administrator: Maine Department of Agriculture, Conservation and Forestry
- Website: Official website
- Maine State Parks

Fort Point State Park is a public recreation area that overlooks Penobscot Bay from the easternmost tip of Cape Jellison in the town of Stockton Springs, Maine. The state park's 156 acres (63 ha) feature the Fort Point Light and the site of historic Fort Pownall. The park offers hiking trails, picnicking, and fishing.

== History ==
The area was settled by English colonists in 1759 when Governor of Massachusetts Thomas Pownall brought in 400 men under the command of Jedidiah Preble to build Fort Pownall during the French and Indian War. The fort, which was meant to strategically protect English interests in the Penobscot River area, saw no action during the war. In 1775, after the British seized the fort's guns in the Burning of Falmouth, rebellious colonists destroyed the blockhouse and filled in its moat to keep it from falling into British hands.

In 1872, a 200-room luxury hotel was constructed on the site with the aim of attracting wealthy guests who would arrive mostly via steamboat. The hotel was not a success and burned down in 1898.

The site was opened as a state park in 1974.
