= Fort Point Light (Maine) =

Lighthouse in Maine, US

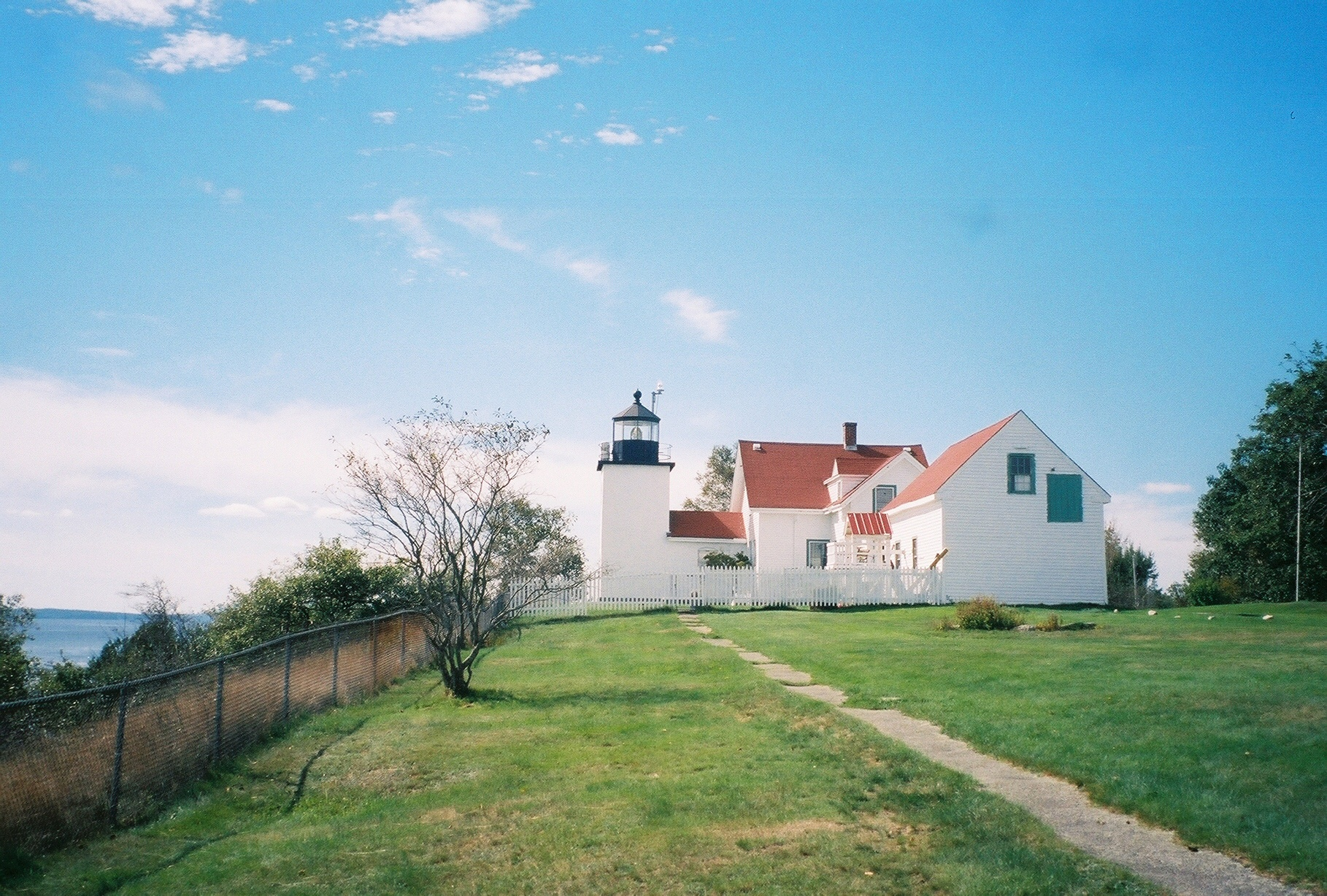
- Fort Point Light in September, 2005.
- Location: Penobscot River Entrance
- Coordinates: 44°28′1.682″N 68°48′42.058″W

Tower
- Constructed: 1836
- Automated: 1988
- Height: 9.5 m (31 ft)
- Shape: Square Brick Tower
- Markings: White
- Heritage: National Register of Historic Places listed place
- Fog signal: HORN: 1 every 10s

Light
- First lit: 1857 (current structure)
- Focal height: 88 feet (27 m)
- Lens: 4th order Fresnel Lens
- Range: 15 nautical miles (28 km; 17 mi)
- Characteristic: F W
- Fort Point Light Station
- U.S. National Register of Historic Places
- U.S. Historic district
- Nearest city: Stockton Springs, Maine
- Built: 1857
- Architect: US Army Corps of Engineers
- MPS: Light Stations of Maine MPS
- NRHP reference No.: 87002269
- Added to NRHP: March 23, 1988

The Fort Point Light, or Fort Point Light Station, is located in Fort Point State Park, in Stockton Springs, Maine. A lighthouse at this point has served as an active aid to navigation since 1835; the present lighthouse dates to 1857, and is listed on the National Register of Historic Places.

== Setting ==
Fort Point State Park is located at the easternmost tip of Cape Jellison, a triangular peninsula which juts into Penobscot Bay at the mouth of the Penobscot River. The 120-acre (49 ha) park, established in 1974, includes, in addition to the lighthouse and related station buildings, the ruins of Fort Pownall, built in 1757. The lighthouse is set just southwest of the easternmost point of the peninsula, and south of the fort's remains.

== Description ==
The light station consists of a lighthouse with integrated keeper's house, a barn, an oil house, and a bell house. The square brick lighthouse tower is 26 feet (7.9 m) in height (measured to the height of the lantern), with a square parapet surrounding the octagonal lantern house. The lantern house is capped by an octagonal roof with a spherical ventilator. A narrow single-story brick work room connects the tower to the keeper's house, a 2 1/2-story wood-frame structure with its main gable oriented north–south. Its main facade, facing west, is three bays wide, with the entrance set in the rightmost bay in an enclosed projecting gabled vestibule. A single story ell projects to the building's rear.

Just east of the house stands a small barn, that is known to have been standing here since the 1890s. Also standing to the west is the small brick oilhouse, with a single door in one side, and pent gable ends on its roof. Further to the east stands the bell house, a roughly pyramidal wood-frame structure finished in wooden shingles. The oil house was built in 1897, the bell house in 1890.

== History ==
The Fort Point Light Station was authorized by Congress in 1834, and built on land purchased from William Clewley, the first keeper. It was the first river light in Maine, built at a time when traffic on the bay and river were increasing. The present tower and keeper's house were built in 1857 as a replacement for the first lighthouse. The original lamp was replaced in 1935, and electrified in 1950. It was automated in 1988 and remains an active aid to navigation.

The light's fourth order fresnel lens is one of only eight fresnel lenses still in use in Maine. The original fog signal, a 1,200-pound (540 kg) cast iron bell, has been replaced by a fog horn in the same building. The lighthouse was leased to the state by the United States Coast Guard in 1989, and sold to it in 1998.

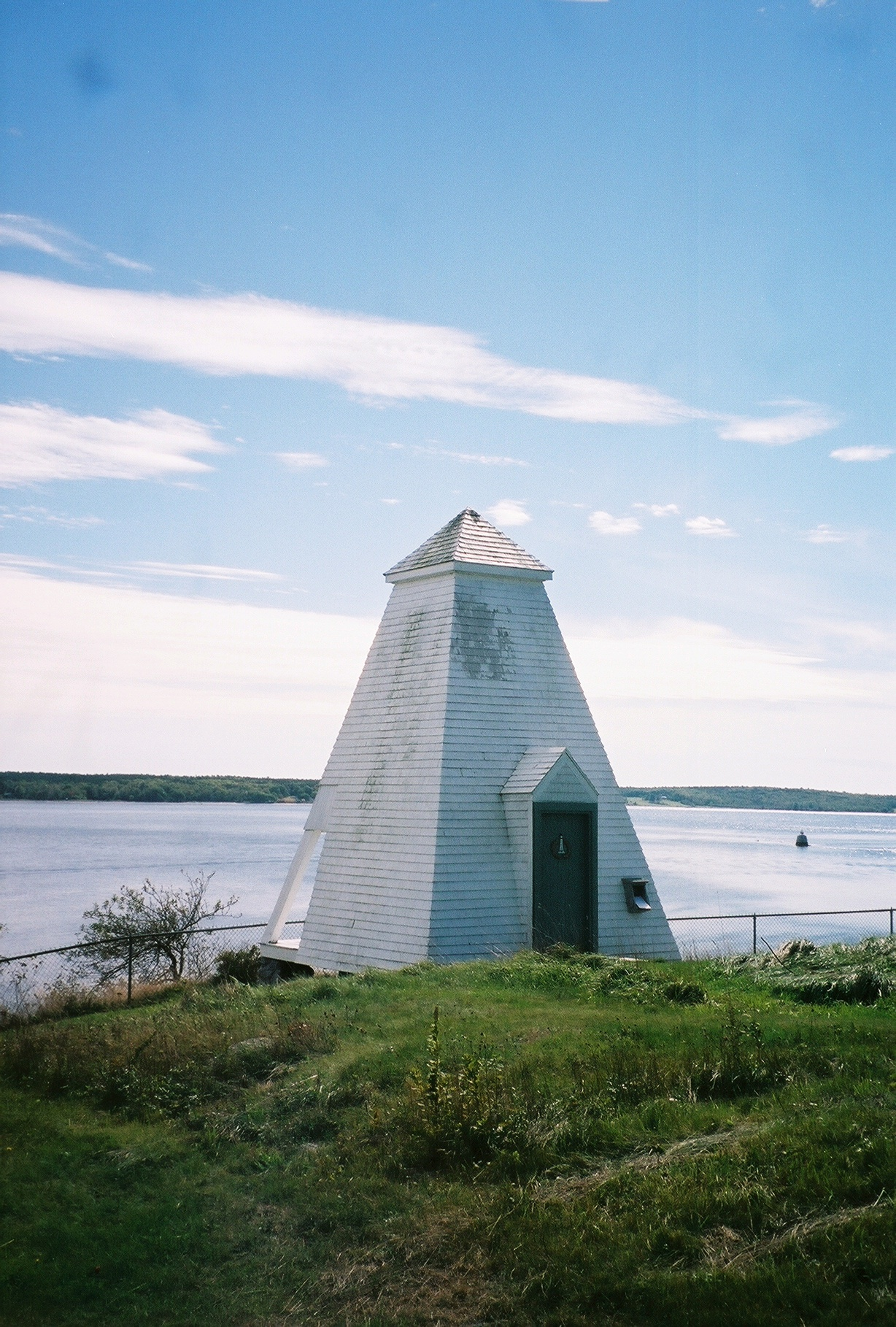
Fog signal tower in September, 2005

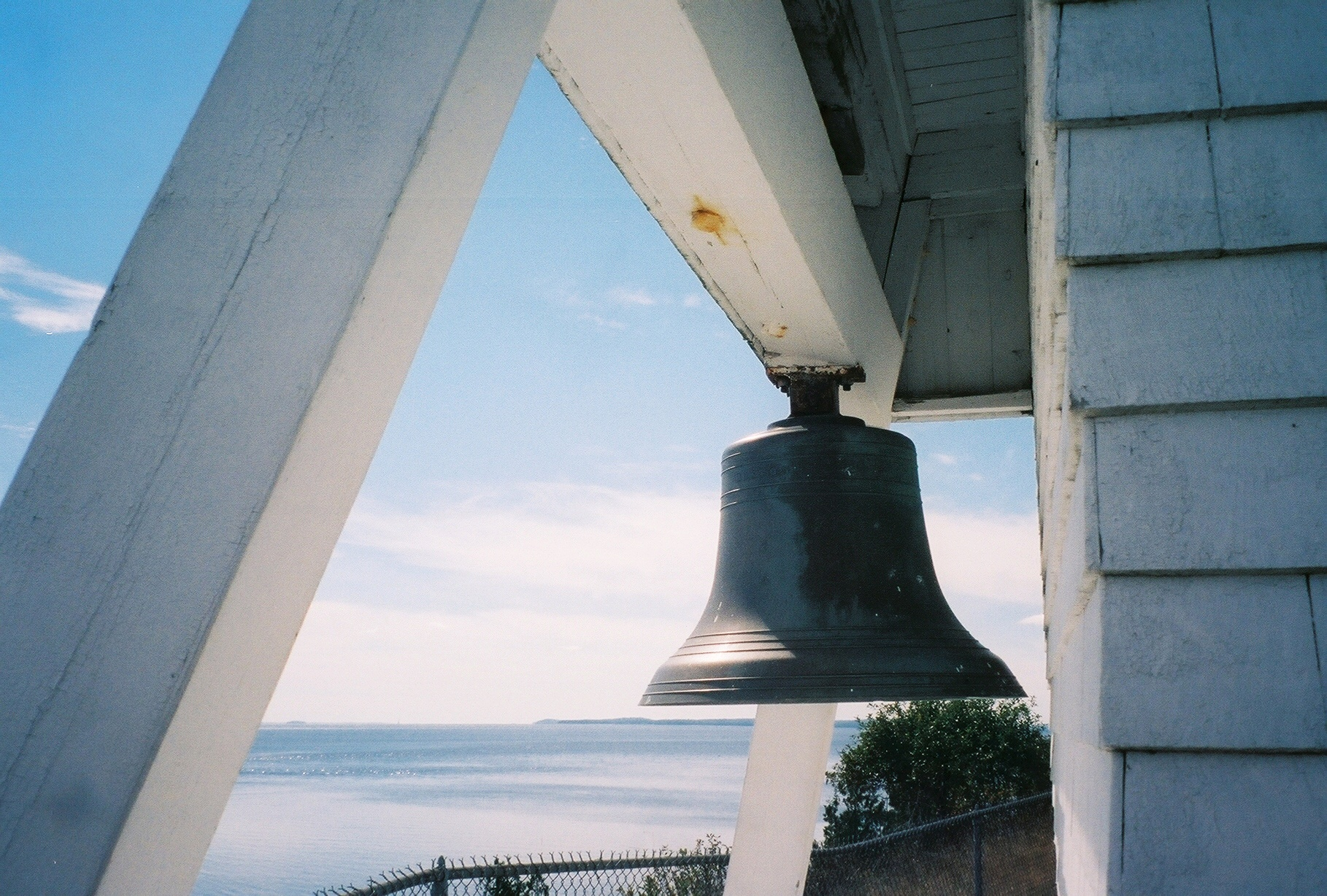
Fog signal bell

== See also ==
- List of lighthouses in Maine
- National Register of Historic Places listings in Waldo County, Maine
