= Samuel Waldo =

American merchant, military officer and politician (1696-1759)

Brigadier General Samuel Waldo
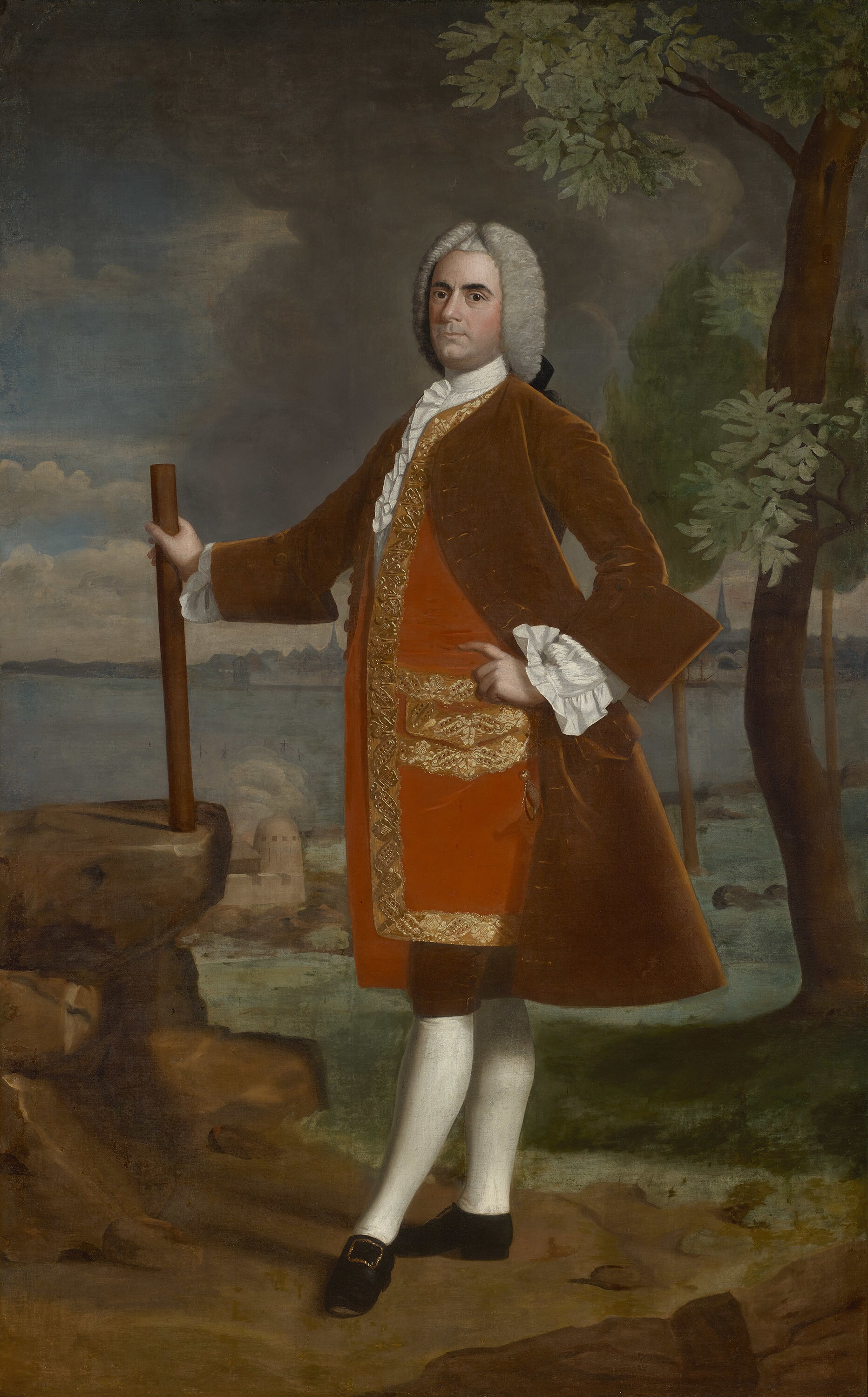
- Portrait by Robert Feke, c. 1748–1750
- Born: August 7, 1696; Boston, Massachusetts
- Died: May 23, 1759 (aged 62); Near Bangor, Massachusetts
- Resting place: King's Chapel Burying Ground, Boston
- Spouse: Lucy Wainwright (m. 1722)
- Relatives: Lucy Flucker Knox (granddaughter)
- Military career
- Allegiance: Massachusetts
- Branch: Massachusetts Provincial Forces
- Service years: 1744–1759
- Rank: Brigadier general
- Commands: 2nd Massachusetts Regiment
- Conflicts: King George's War; Siege of Louisbourg (1745); French and Indian War
- Other work: named Mount Waldo

Signature
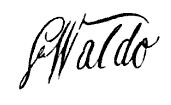

Brigadier General Samuel Waldo (August 7, 1696 – May 23, 1759) was an American merchant, military officer, slave trader and politician from colonial Massachusetts.

== Life ==
Samuel Waldo was born on August 7, 1696, in Boston, the son of Jonathan Waldo and his wife Hannah. In 1722, he married Lucy Wainwright and eight years later Waldo purchased a 17th-century title to a large tract of land in the British colony of Nova Scotia with the intent of establishing a colonial settlement there; the title did not stand up when he proposed this plan to authorities in England. A one-time business partner of Thomas Westbrook, Waldo acquired a large tract of land between the Penobscot and Muscongus rivers in what is now Maine where he arranged for Irish and German immigrants to settle. Like many wealthy Bostonians, Waldo was also a slaveowner.

From the late 1720s onwards Waldo was active as a slave trader, selling Black slaves in Boston and organizing slave-trading expeditions to Africa. He advertised slave sales through Boston newspapers and in 1734 Waldo's sloop Africa was sent to Guinea to purchase slaves. The sloop was captained by Samuel Rhodes, to whom Waldo wrote "for your safety as well as mine, you'll have the needful guard over your Slaves, and put not too much Confidence in the Women nor Children lest they happen to be Instrumental to your being surprised which may be fatall." Once arriving in Guinea Africa's crew purchased 200 African slaves and returned to the Americas but on the return voyage most of the slaves she was transporting died of dysentery. This led Waldo to unsuccessfully sue Rhodes for damages.

During King George's War, Waldo was commissioned as a brigadier general in the Massachusetts Provincial Forces in 1744 and began raising men for the 2nd Massachusetts Regiment. In 1745 he participated in the expedition which captured Louisbourg from the French and served on the temporary council that administered the settlement until Peter Warren was named governor. In 1757, during the French and Indian War, Waldo submitted a plan to William Pitt the Elder which served as a basis for the second capture of Louisbourg from the French the following year. Waldo died of apoplexy near present-day Bangor, Maine in 1759 while participating in a military expedition with Governor Thomas Pownall.

Waldo was initially buried at Fort Pownall (at Cape Jellison), but his remains were transported to Boston in 1760 and interred at the King's Chapel Burying Ground. The Maine towns of Waldo and Waldoboro, together with Waldo County, are named for Waldo. His son-in-law Thomas Flucker was royal secretary of Massachusetts and later Provincial Governor. His granddaughter, Lucy Flucker Knox, married Revolutionary War hero and founding father Henry Knox. The Knox family built the impressive Montpelier on Waldo's tract of land in Thomaston, Maine.

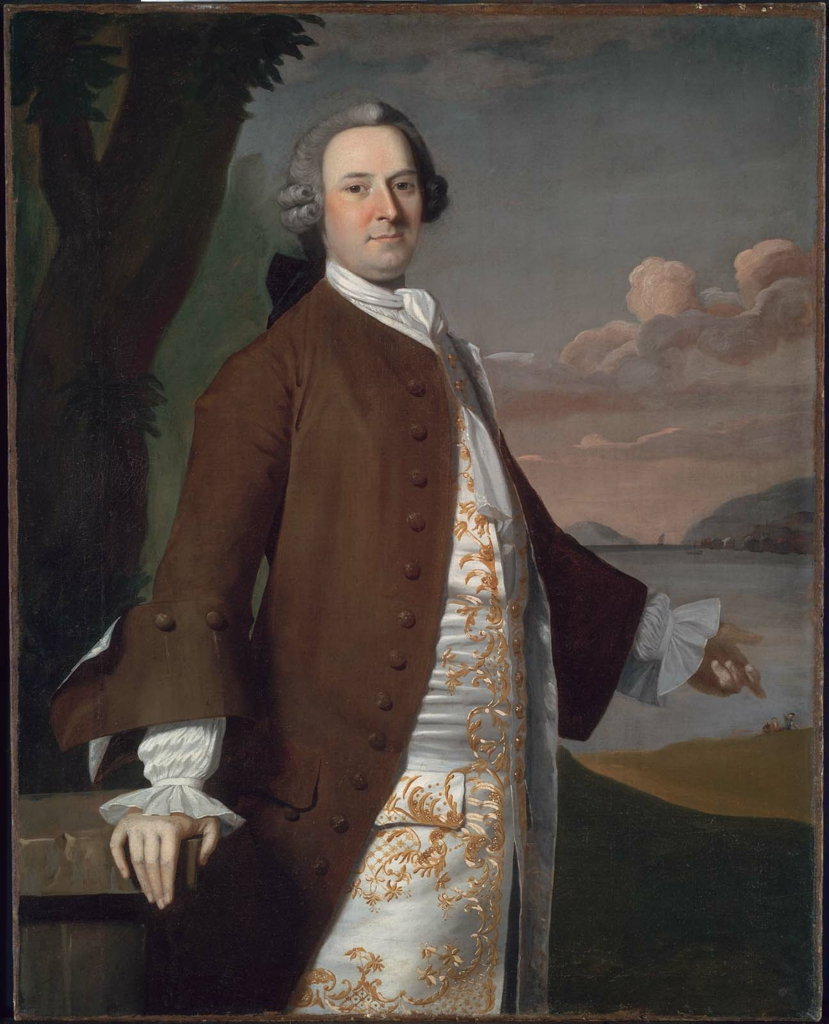
Samuel Waldo son-in-law Isaac Winslow [1709-1777] by Robert Feke

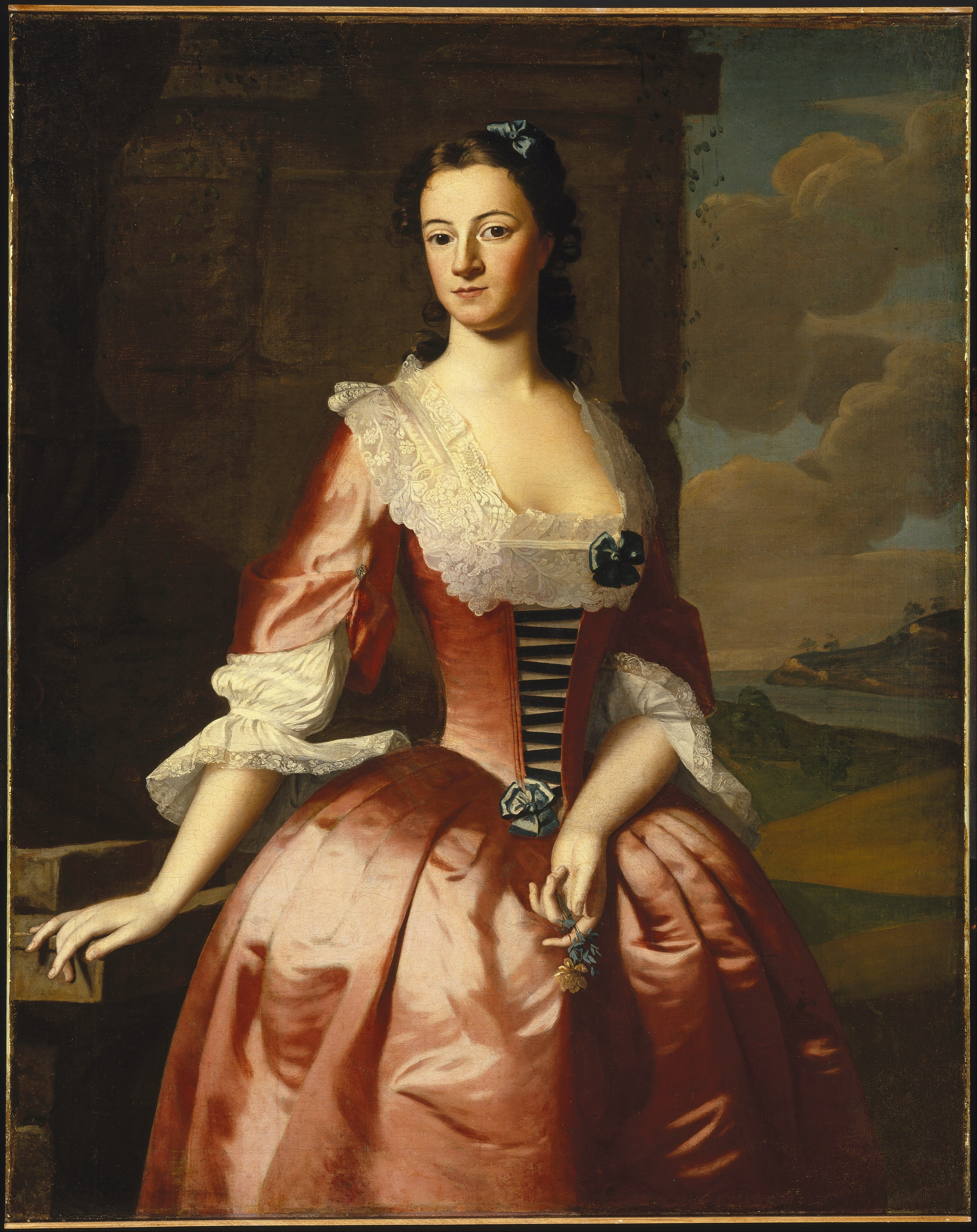
Mrs. Lucy [Waldo] Winslow by Robert Feke

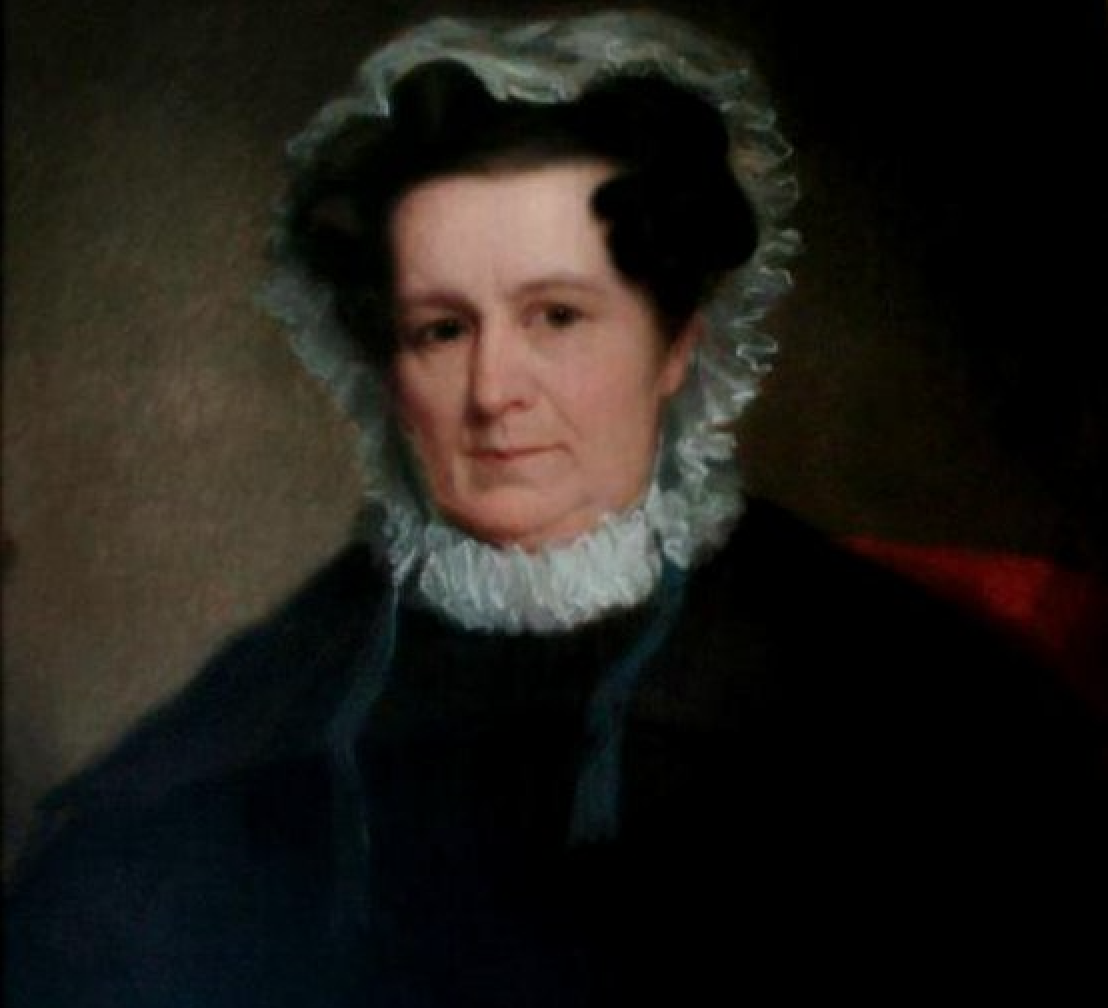
Portrait of Lucy Knox's daughter, Lucy Flucker Knox Thatcher by Albert Gallatin Hoit

== See also ==
- Waldo Patent
