= 1869 Maine gubernatorial election =

- September 13, 1869
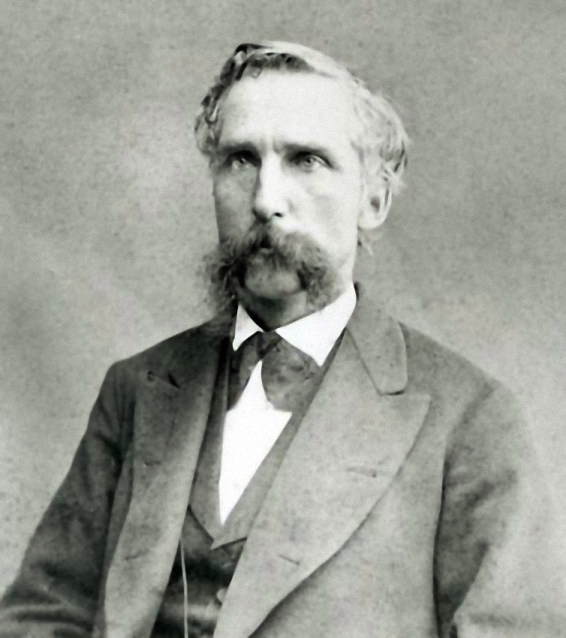

Nominee	Joshua Chamberlain	Franklin Smith
Party	Republican	Democratic
Popular vote	51,314	39,033
Percentage	53.97%	41.05%
- County results Chamberlain: 40–50% 50–60% 60–70% Smith: 50–60%
Governor before election
Joshua Chamberlain
Republican
Elected Governor
Joshua Chamberlain
Republican

The 1869 Maine gubernatorial election was held on September 13, 1869. Republican candidate and war hero Joshua Chamberlain defeated the Democratic candidate Franklin Smith and Prohibition candidate Nathan Griffith Hichborn.

== General election ==
=== Candidates ===
==== Republican ====
- Joshua Chamberlain, incumbent Governor (since 1867)

==== Democratic ====
- Franklin Smith

===== Prohibition/Temperance =====
- Nathan Griffin Hichborn, former state treasurer (1865–1868)

=== Results ===
1869 Maine gubernatorial election
Party	Candidate	Votes	%	±%
Republican	Joshua Chamberlain (incumbent)	51,314	53.97	▼3.36
Democratic	Franklin Smith	39,033	41.05	▼1.62
Prohibition	Nathan Griffin Hichborn	4,735	4.98	N/A
Total votes		95,082	100.00	▼27.82
Republican hold				
