= Jedidiah Preble =

American military officer (1707–1784)

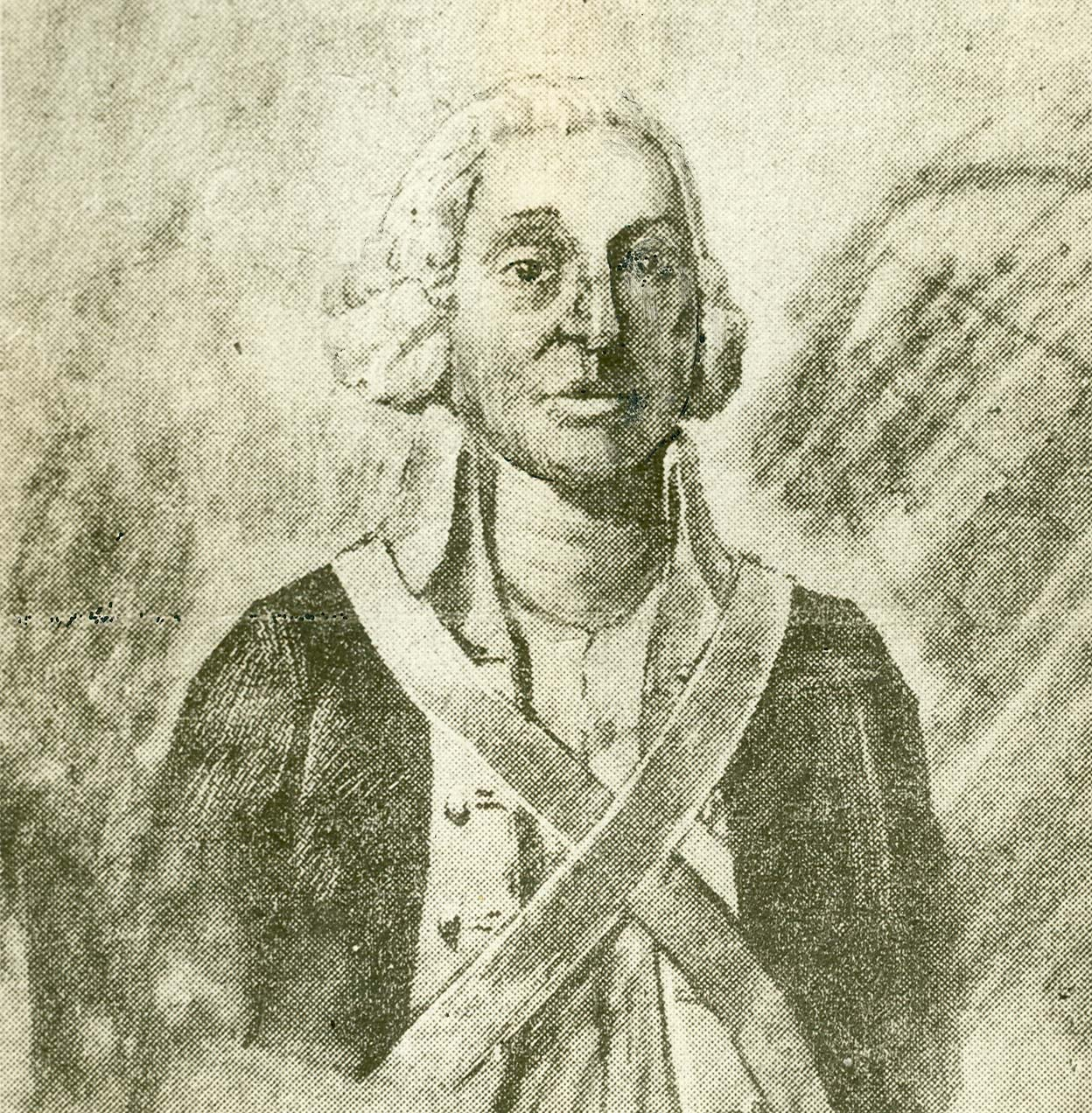
- Born: March 1, 1707; York, Province of Massachusetts Bay
- Died: March 11, 1784 (aged 77); Falmouth, Commonwealth of Massachusetts
- Burial place: Portland, Maine
- Spouse: Mehitable Bangs Roberts
- Children: Martha, Ebenezer, Joshua, Edward, Enoch, Statira, Henry
- Military career
- Allegiance: Great Britain; Province of Massachusetts Bay
- Branch: Massachusetts Bay Militia
- Rank: Chief Commander, Captain, Brigadier General
- Conflicts: Cape Sable Campaign, Battle of Fort Beauséjour, Siege of Louisbourg (1745), Battle of Grand Pré

Jedidiah Preble (1707–1784) was Captain of Infantry in Samuel Waldo's Regiment, whom he bought land from and settled in Falmouth, Maine (present-day Portland, Maine). He served in the Siege of Louisbourg (1745). He also fought in the Battle of Grand Pre (1747). He accompanied John Winslow on his expedition up the Kennebec River and participated with him the following year in the Battle of Fort Beauséjour (1755) where he was wounded. He then participated in the Cape Sable Campaign, part of the expulsion of the Acadians. After the British took control of the Saint John River, they took control of the final river the Penobscot. Preble became commander at the newly built Fort Point (formally Fort Pownal) on the Penobscot River (1759).

He was also active in the American Revolution. Gen. Jedidiah Preble, with Gen. Artemas Ward and Col. Seth Pomeroy, were chosen General Officers of the Provincial forces by the House of Representatives of Massachusetts that resolved itself into a Provincial Congress. Gen. Preble was chosen to the chief command. He was forced to decline his appointment on account of ill health and advanced age, and it was then bestowed upon Gen. Artemas Ward, who at a later period was superseded by George Washington.

He was the father of Edward Preble, after whom Preble Street in Portland and Fort Preble in South Portland are named.
