= James Kirby Martin =

American historian (1943–2024)

- photo taken around 2010
- Born: May 26, 1943; Akron, Ohio
- Died: December 31, 2024 (aged 81); Houston, Texas
- Citizenship: American
- Education: Hiram College (BA); University of Wisconsin–Madison (MA, PhD)
- Occupations: Historian; Professor at the University of Houston
- Years active: 1969–2024
- Political party: Independent
- Spouse: Karen Martin
- Children: 3
- Parent(s): Dr. Paul Martin and Dorothy Garrett-Martin
- Website: https://jameskirbymartin.com/

James Kirby Martin (May 26, 1943 – December 31, 2024) was an American historian who was a Hugh Roy and Lillie Cranz Cullen University Professor of History at the University of Houston, Houston, Texas. He studied American military and social history, specifically the American Revolution, and alcohol-related issues in the United States. In addition to his scholarly work and publications, Martin has advised and appeared on television programs aired on the History Channel and also advised New York-based Talon Films on historical issues. He has also become involved in movie production.

== Education, background, and achievements ==
Martin received his B.A. from Hiram College (summa cum laude) and then earned his M.A. and Ph.D. from the University of Wisconsin. He began his teaching career at Rutgers University, where he earned the rank of Professor of History and also served for a period as vice president for Academic Affairs. In 1980, Martin moved to the University of Houston, having accepted assignment as the Department Chair of History. Martin helped to found the Papers of Thomas Edison project at Rutgers University and for a few years served on its board of advisers. He was also on the advisory board of the Papers of William Livingston project. Martin has served as general editor for a book series, the American Social Experience (New York University Press), and as a consulting editor for a book series entitled Conversations with the Past (Brandywine Press). Martin was serving on the advisory board of editors for the Critical Historical Encounters book series sponsored by Oxford University Press.

Martin consulted some of the nation's most eminent law firms with regard to the history of various consumer products, including alcohol and tobacco, and collaborated and appeared on programs aired by the History Channel. Talon Films of New York also regularly consulted Martin on historical matters. Martin worked on two movie screenplays: one focusing on Benedict Arnold’s treason and the other on Oneida warrior Han Yerry Doxtader and Mohawk warrior Joseph Brant.

Martin died on December 31, 2024, at the age of 81.

== Teaching inventory ==
Martin's teaching interests include early American history through the Revolution, American military history through the Civil War, and the history of medicine and health in the United States, particularly that of drinking, smoking, and drug usage. He taught many undergraduate courses at the University of Houston, including a survey history of the United States; topical courses in colonial and Revolutionary American history; and capstone courses on such subjects as disease and addiction in the American experience. At the graduate level, Martin has offered a variety of courses, including early American historiography as well as introductory and advanced courses on research and writing in United States history.

== Research interests ==
Martin was the award-winning author and editor of twelve books and numerous scholarly articles. His later research interests focused on military, social, and political aspects of early American history, especially the Revolutionary era and beyond.

Martin completed a major revision of his co-authored work, A Respectable Army: The Military Origins of the Republic, 1763-1789 (2006), and he has co-authored (with Joseph Glatthaar) Forgotten Allies: The Oneida Indians and the American Revolution (2006). In 2008, a new third edition of Ordinary Courage: The Revolutionary War Adventures of Joseph Plumb Martin, also appeared.

Martin's later writing projects included The Remarkable Revolution: How the United States Avoided Becoming a Military Dictatorship, 1775-1787 (tentative title, with Oxford University Press), as well as a volume on Han Yerry Doxtader and the Iroquois Indians titled American Warrior: Han Yerry Doxtader, the Battle of Oriskany, and the Decline and Fall of the Six Nations of Iroquois Indians. Two other projects under way include an investigation of Benedict Arnold's treason (with Oxford University Press), and a study of the history of smoking in America (a companion volume related to his earlier co-authored book on drinking in America).

== Works ==
- Martin, James Kirby (1976). Men in rebellion : higher governmental leaders and the coming of the American Revolution. New York: Free Press. ISBN 0029201209. LCCN 75046596.
- Interpreting colonial America; selected readings. Martin, James Kirby, comp. (2d ed.). New York: Harper & Row. 1978. ISBN 978-0-06-044209-5. LCCN 77007111.
- Martin, James Kirby, ed. (1976). The Human dimensions of nation making : essays on colonial and revolutionary America. Madison: State Historical Society of Wisconsin. ISBN 0870201581. LCCN 75030821.
- Martin, James Kirby; Stubaus, Karen R., eds. (1977). The American Revolution : whose revolution?. Huntington, New York: R. E. Krieger Pub. Co. ISBN 0882753975. LCCN 76018740.
- Martin, James Kirby (1979). In the course of human events : an interpretive exploration of the American Revolution. Arlington Heights, Illinois: AHM Pub. Corp. ISBN 0882957945. LCCN 79050878.
- Lender, Mark E.; Martin, James Kirby, eds. (1982). Citizen soldier : the Revolutionary War journal of Joseph Bloomfield. Newark: New Jersey Historical Society. ISBN 0911020055. LCCN 82003618. (on Bloomfield, Joseph, 1753–1823)
- Lender, Mark Edward; Martin, James Kirby (1987). Drinking in America : a history (The rev. and expanded ed.). New York: Free Press. ISBN 002918570X. LCCN 86032885.
- Martin, James Kirby; et al. (1995). A concise history of America and its people. New York, NY: HarperCollins College. ISBN 0673467805. LCCN 94020138.
- Martin, James Kirby (1997). Benedict Arnold, revolutionary hero : an American warrior reconsidered. New York: New York University Press. ISBN 0814755607. LCCN 97004631.
- Martin, James Kirby; Randy W. Roberts; Steven H. Mintz; Linda O. McMurry; James H. Jones (2004). American and Its Peoples: A Mosaic in the Making (5th ed.). New York: Pearson Longman. ISBN 0321162145. LCCN 2003014085.
- Glatthaar, Joseph T.; Martin, James Kirby (2006). Forgotten allies : the Oneida Indians and the American revolution (1st ed.). New York: Hill and Wang. ISBN 0809046016. LCCN 2006002369.
- Martin, James Kirby; Lender, Mark Edward (2006). A respectable army : the military origins of the Republic, 1763-1789 (2nd ed.). Wheeling, Ill.: Harlan Davidson, Inc. ISBN 9780882952390. LCCN 2005006563.
- Martin, James Kirby, ed. (2008). Ordinary courage : the Revolutionary War adventures of Joseph Plumb Martin (3rd ed.). Malden, MA: Blackwell Publishing. ISBN 9781405177061. LCCN 2007036379., on Martin, Joseph Plumb, 1760–1850.
- Martin, James Kirby, ed. (2012). Ordinary courage : the Revolutionary War adventures of Joseph Plumb Martin. with an essay "The Revolutionary War Soldier on Film" by Karen Guenther (Fourth ed.). Hoboken: John Wiley & Sons, Ltd. ISBN 9781444351354. LCCN 2011051679., on Martin, Joseph Plumb, 1760–1850.
