= Sandy Point, Maine =

- Village
- Sandy Point Beach in 2025

- Location within Maine
- Coordinates: 44°30′53″N 68°48′46″W
- Country: United States
- State: Maine
- County: Waldo
- Elevation: 89 ft (27 m)
- Time zone: UTC-5 (Eastern (EST))
  - Summer (DST): UTC-4 (EDT)
- ZIP Code: 04972
- Area code: 207
- GNIS feature ID: 574886

Sandy Point is an unincorporated village in the town of Stockton Springs, Waldo County, Maine, United States. The community is located along U.S. Route 1 on the west bank of the Penobscot River estuary, 4.1 miles (6.6 km) south of Bucksport. Sandy Point has a post office with ZIP Code 04972, which opened on January 1, 1795.
