= Fort Pownall =

- Fort Pownall Memorial
- U.S. National Register of Historic Places
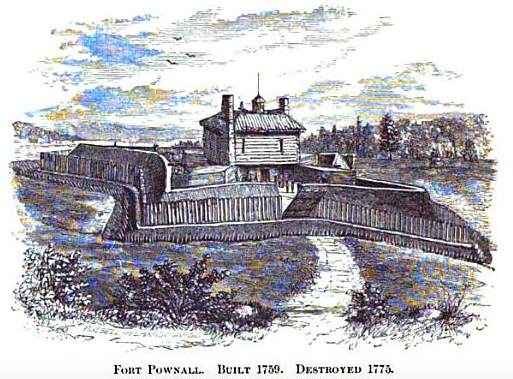

- Location within Maine
- Interactive map of Fort Pownall Memorial
- Nearest city: Stockton Springs, Maine
- Coordinates: 44°28′5″N 68°48′46″W
- Area: 3 acres (1.2 ha)
- Built: May–July 1759
- NRHP reference No.: 69000028
- Added to NRHP: October 28, 1969

Fort Pownall was a British fortification built during the French and Indian War, whose remains are located at Fort Point State Park in Stockton Springs, Maine. The fort was named for Governor Thomas Pownall, who oversaw its construction. It never saw action, and was destroyed during the American Revolutionary War by the actions of both colonists and the British military to prevent its further use. The fort's remains were listed on the National Register of Historic Places in 1969.

== Setting ==
Fort Point State Park is located at the easternmost tip of Cape Jellison, a triangular peninsula which juts into Penobscot Bay at the mouth of the Penobscot River. The 120-acre (49 ha) park, established in 1974, includes, in addition to the ruins of Fort Pownall, the Fort Point Light. The cape's eastern tip forms a narrow peninsula, with the fort's ruins on the high ground near its easternmost end.

== History ==
In 1759, during the French and Indian War, Massachusetts governor Thomas Pownall led the construction of a fort here, which he named Fort Pownall after himself. It was one of three significant forts which the British built on the major rivers in the Northeast to cut off the native water ways to the ocean to prevent Indian attacks on the Thirteen Colonies (see also Fort Halifax and Fort Frederick). The fort was also intended by Pownall to reduce France's presence in North America, since "for as long as any Indian has any claim to [the region surrounding the fort], the French will maintain a title to them." The first commander of the fort was Jedidiah Preble (1759–1763), followed by Col. Thomas Goldthwait (1763–1775). In 1775, British forces seized the cannons and powder during the American Revolution. Later, a regiment of Continental Army soldiers burnt the blockhouse and filled in most of the ditches to prevent their use by the British.

== Description ==
The fort, as built, was roughly 240 feet (73 m) on each side, with an octagonal star-shaped earthworks surrounded by a moat or ditch 15 feet (4.6 m) wide and 8 feet (2.4 m) deep. Inside the earthworks was a blockhouse, built out of squared timbers, measuring 44 feet (13 m) on each side, and two stories in height. At each corner there was a diamond-shaped projection, where each side was 33 feet (10 m). Because the blockhouse and other wooden elements of the fort were burned, only the earthworks and stone foundations remain.

== See also ==
- National Register of Historic Places listings in Waldo County, Maine
