= Stockton Springs Community Church =

Historic church in Maine, United States

- U.S. National Register of Historic Places
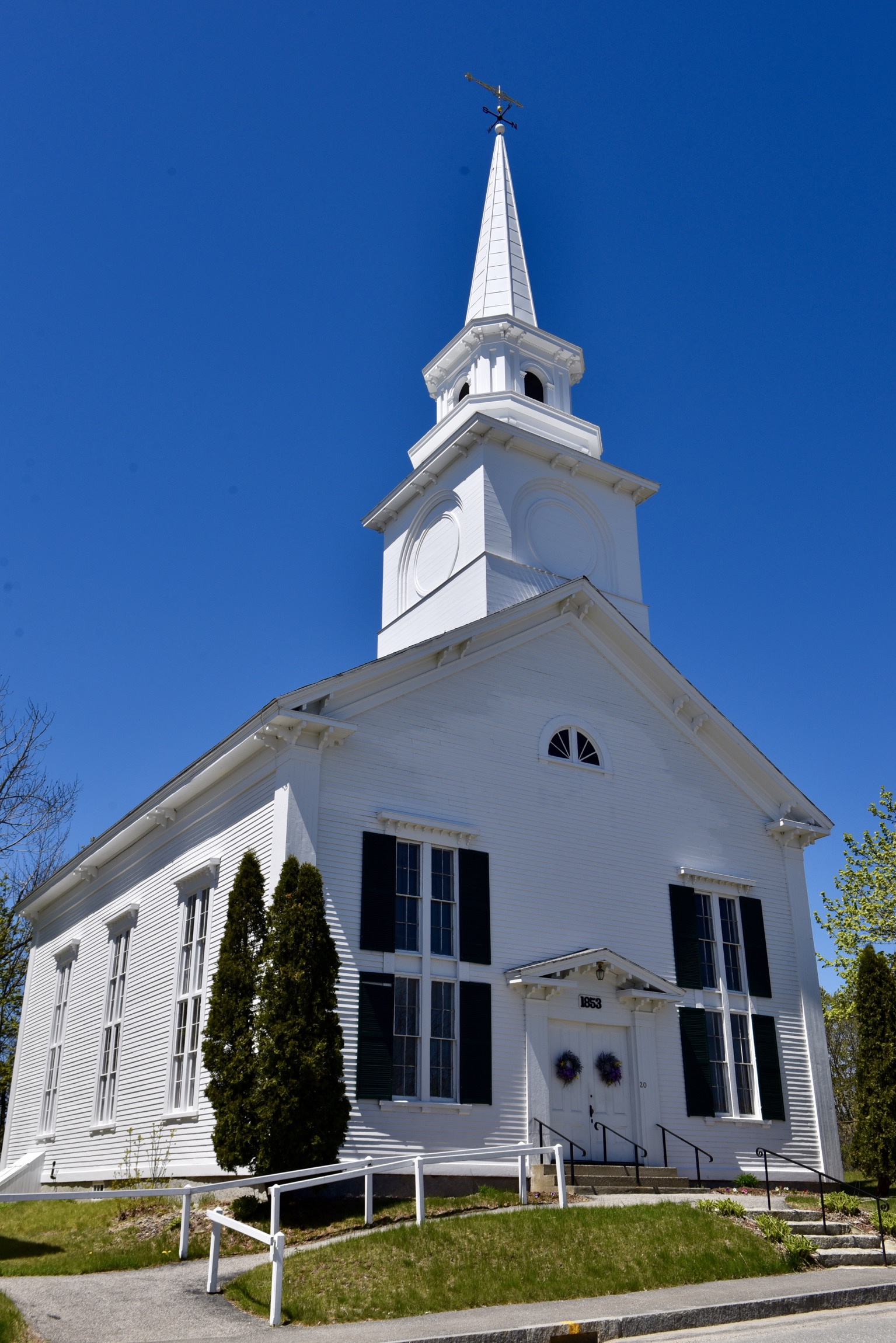

- Location within Maine Location within the United States
- Location: 20 Church St., Stockton Springs, Maine
- Coordinates: 44°29′28″N 68°51′29″W
- Area: 0.5 acres (0.20 ha)
- Built: 1853
- Built by: Rendell, S.A.
- Architect: Biather, Alfred
- Architectural style: Greek Revival, Italianate
- NRHP reference No.: 85001266
- Added to NRHP: June 20, 1985

Stockton Springs Community Church, formerly the Stockton Springs Universalist Church, is a historic church at 20 Church Street in Stockton Springs, Maine. Built in 1853, it is a fine example of transitional Greek Revival-Italianate architecture, and is particularly noted for the trompe-l'œil frescoes on its walls. It was listed on the National Register of Historic Places in 1985.

== Description and history ==
The Stockton Springs Community Church is located in the center of Stockton Springs, on the west side of Church Street, just south of its junction with United States Route 1. It is a single story wood-frame structure, with a gable roof and clapboard siding. The building corners are pilastered, and the deep eaves are studded with paired brackets. The main facade is three bays wide, with a central entrance sheltered by a deep gabled pediment. Windows in the flanking bays are four narrow sash, in two-over-two pairs with bracketed cornices above. In the gable there is a small half-round window. The interior condition (like the exterior) is relatively unaltered, with original pews and pulpit. It is dominated by the trompe-l'œil frescoes on its walls, which depict classical motifs, with a triumphal arch over the pulpit, and Greek floral designs on the ceiling.

The church was built in 1853 for a Universalist congregation. Alfred Biather was the architect and S. A. Rendell was the builder. The church tower was designed by a Mr. Wren of Boston and the bell was cast by the Revere Copper Company. The artwork was executed by Boston-based artist William Lawlor. It is one of four churches in Maine with trompe-l'œil artwork, and is the oldest of those. The church has served as a non-denominational community church since the 1930s.

== See also ==
- National Register of Historic Places listings in Waldo County, Maine
