= Stockton Springs, Maine =

Town in Maine, United States

- Town
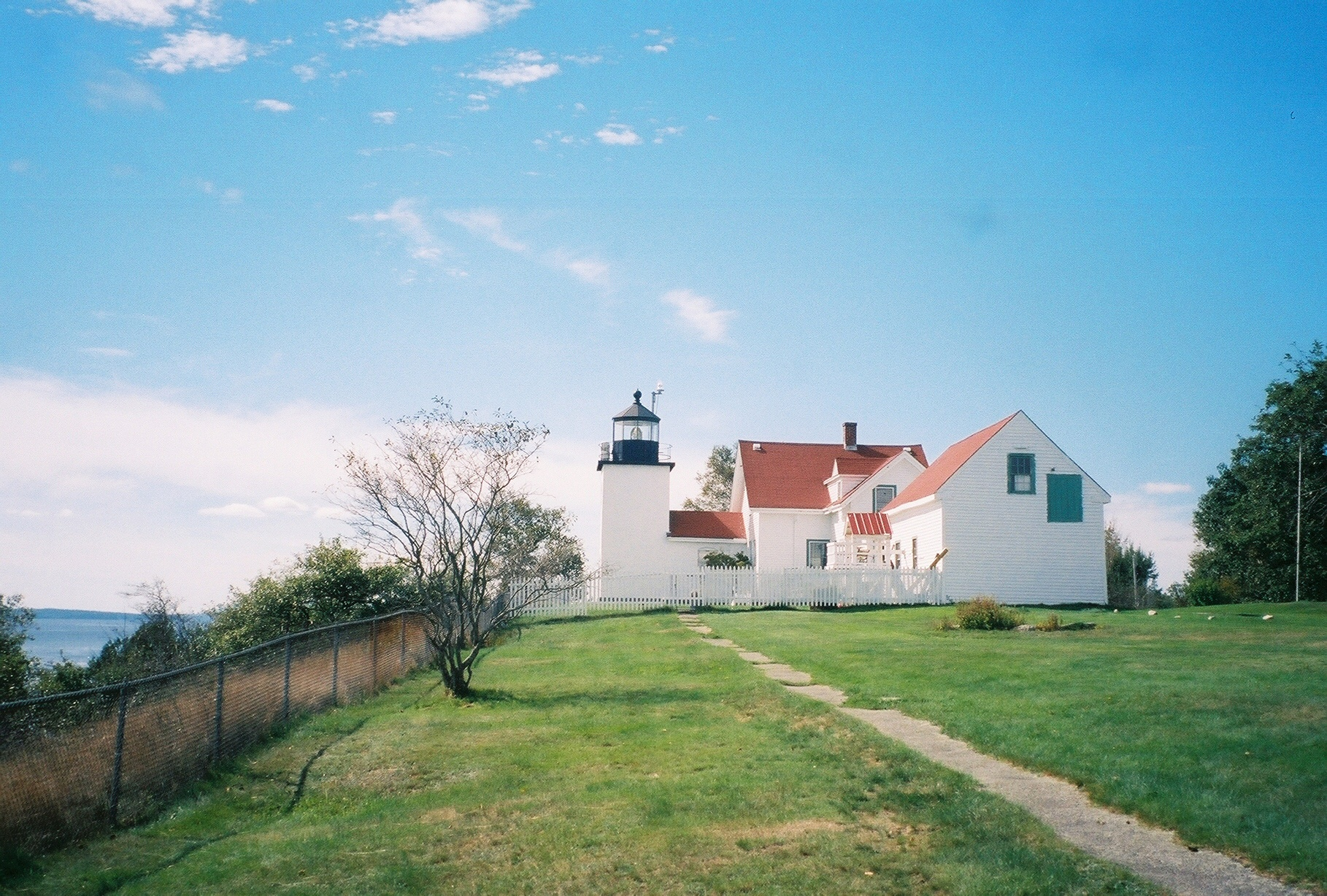
- Fort Point Light

- Seal

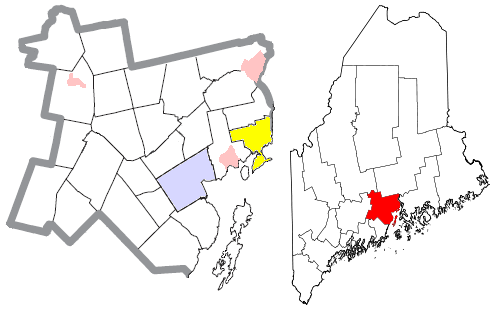
- Location of Stockton Springs (in yellow) in Waldo County and the state of Maine
- Coordinates: 44°30′53″N 68°51′38″W
- Country: United States
- State: Maine
- County: Waldo
- Incorporated: 1857

Area
  - Total: 29.83 sq mi (77.26 km^{2})
  - Land: 19.64 sq mi (50.87 km^{2})
  - Water: 10.19 sq mi (26.39 km^{2})
- Elevation: 164 ft (50 m)

Population (2020)
  - Total: 1,533
  - Density: 78/sq mi (30.1/km^{2})
- Time zone: UTC−5 (Eastern (EST))
  - Summer (DST): UTC−4 (EDT)
- ZIP Codes: 04981 (Stockton Springs); 04972 (Sandy Point)
- Area code: 207
- FIPS code: 23-74475
- GNIS feature ID: 582749
- Website: www.stocktonsprings.org

Stockton Springs is a town in Waldo County, Maine, United States. The population was 1,533 at the 2020 census. Stockton Springs is home to Fort Point State Park and Fort Point Light, both located on Fort Point, a peninsula on Cape Jellison.

== History ==
Part of the Waldo Patent, it was first settled about 1759, the year Governor Thomas Pownall completed Fort Pownall on Fort Point. The defense was intended to guard the mouth of the Penobscot River estuary during the French and Indian War. Fort Pownall was burned in 1775 and 1779 by the British themselves, to prevent it from falling into the hands of Americans.

On February 29, 1794, the area was incorporated as part of Prospect, but then set off and incorporated as a town on March 13, 1857, named Stockton after a port in England. In 1859, businesses included four sawmills, three shingle mills, two lath mills, one carding machine, one cloth-dressing mill, one tannery, four shipyards, six blacksmith shops, and several mechanic shops. By 1886, it also had a shoe factory, cheese factory, a door, sash and blind factory, cask and barrel makers, and a clothing factory. On February 5, 1889, the town's name was changed to Stockton Springs in anticipation of bottling local spring water. When sediment was discovered in the bottles, however, the plan was abandoned.

Cape Jellison developed into a bustling port. Between 1905 and 1907, three huge wooden piers were built, the biggest 1,750 feet (530 meters) in length. The Bangor & Aroostook Railroad transported goods to and from the docks. An immense warehouse held potatoes from Aroostook County until schooners could deliver them elsewhere. The wharves were destroyed in a fire on November 8, 1924, ending the harbor's industrial era.

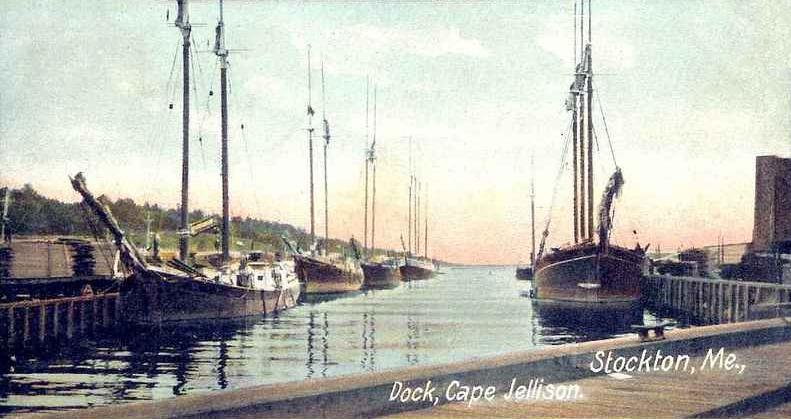
Cape Jellison c. 1908

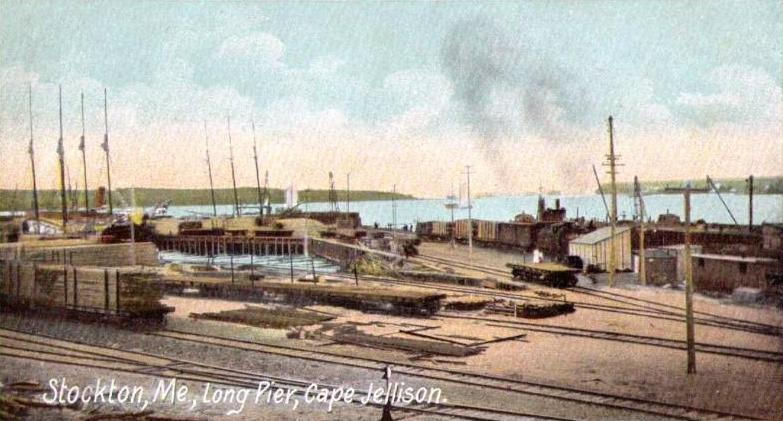
Long Pier c. 1908

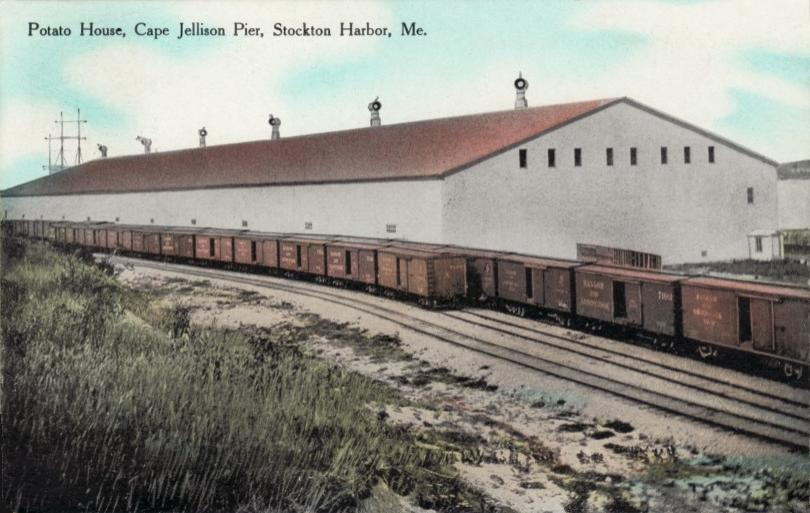
Potato warehouse in 1910

== Geography ==
According to the United States Census Bureau, the town has a total area of 29.83 square miles (77.26 km^{2}), of which 19.64 square miles (50.87 km^{2}) is land and 10.19 square miles (26.39 km^{2}) is water. Stockton Springs is located on Penobscot Bay, part of the Gulf of Maine, Atlantic Ocean.

The town is crossed by U.S. Route 1, U.S. Route 1A and Maine State Route 3.

== Demographics ==
Historical population
Census	Pop.	Note	%±
1860	1,595		—
1870	2,089		31.0%
1880	1,548		−25.9%
1890	1,149		−25.8%
1900	872		−24.1%
1910	1,103		26.5%
1920	1,175		6.5%
1930	877		−25.4%
1940	905		3.2%
1950	949		4.9%
1960	980		3.3%
1970	1,142		16.5%
1980	1,230		7.7%
1990	1,385		12.6%
2000	1,481		6.9%
2010	1,591		7.4%
2020	1,533		−3.6%
U.S. Decennial Census

=== 2010 census ===
As of the census of 2010, there were 1,591 people, 694 households, and 471 families residing in the town. The population density was 81.0 inhabitants per square mile (31.3/km^{2}). There were 939 housing units at an average density of 47.8 per square mile (18.5/km^{2}). The racial makeup of the town was 96.7% White, 0.4% African American, 0.8% Native American, 0.9% Asian, 0.1% from other races, and 1.3% from two or more races. Hispanic or Latino of any race were 0.8% of the population.

There were 694 households, of which 23.6% had children under the age of 18 living with them, 55.2% were married couples living together, 8.4% had a female householder with no husband present, 4.3% had a male householder with no wife present, and 32.1% were non-families. Of all households, 25.1% were made up of individuals, and 12.3% had someone living alone who was 65 years of age or older. The average household size was 2.29 and the average family size was 2.70.

The median age in the town was 49.9 years. Of residents, 17.3% were under the age of 18; 6.6% were between the ages of 18 and 24; 18.3% were from 25 to 44; 37.4% were from 45 to 64; and 20.4% were 65 years of age or older. The gender makeup of the town was 47.3% male and 52.7% female.

=== 2000 census ===
As of the census of 2000, there were 1,481 people, 628 households, and 428 families residing in the town. The population density was 75.6 inhabitants per square mile (29.2/km^{2}). There were 750 housing units at an average density of 38.3 per square mile (14.8/km^{2}). The racial makeup of the town was 96.69% White, 0.41% African American, 0.54% Native American, 0.34% Asian, 0.07% Pacific Islander, 0.07% from other races, and 1.89% from two or more races. Hispanic or Latino of any race were 0.81% of the population.

There were 628 households, out of which 28.7% had children under the age of 18 living with them, 55.7% were married couples living together, 8.8% had a female householder with no husband present, and 31.7% were non-families. Of all households, 24.7% were made up of individuals, and 10.2% had someone living alone who was 65 years of age or older. The average household size was 2.36 and the average family size was 2.82.

In the town, the population was spread out, with 23.8% under the age of 18, 5.5% from 18 to 24, 27.9% from 25 to 44, 29.0% from 45 to 64, and 13.9% who were 65 years of age or older. The median age was 41 years. For every 100 females, there were 93.6 males. For every 100 females age 18 and over, there were 92.3 males.

The median income for a household in the town was $37,050, and the median income for a family was $42,847. Males had a median income of $34,886 versus $23,750 for females. The per capita income for the town was $18,370. About 8.5% of families and 12.1% of the population were below the poverty line, including 18.8% of those under age 18 and 6.5% of those age 65 or over.

== Sites of interest ==
- Fort Point Light
- Fort Pownall Memorial

== Notable people ==
- Neil S. Bishop, Maine state senator
- Nathan Griffin Hichborn, Maine state treasurer

== See also ==
- Stockton Springs Community Church
