= Cape Jellison =

Peninsula on the coast of Maine, US

Coordinates: 44°28′14.6″N 68°50′10.7″W

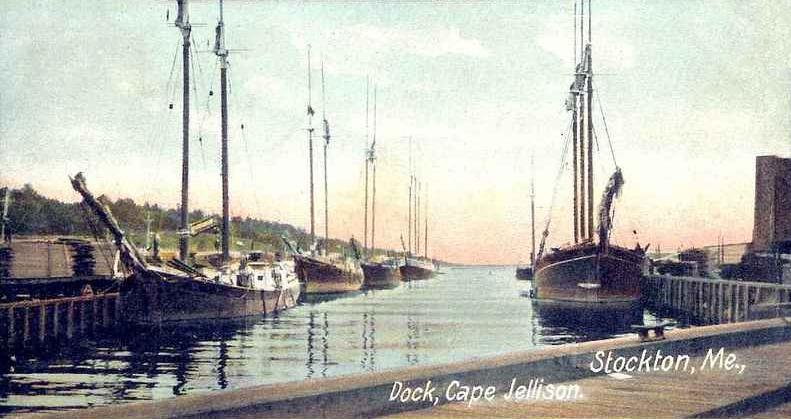
Coastal schooners at Cape Jellison c. 1908

Cape Jellison is a 1,600-acre (6.5 km^{2}) peninsula that juts into Penobscot Bay on the coast of Maine. In colonial times it was known as Wasaumkeag Point. It is part of the town of Stockton Springs, between Searsport and Bucksport, in the upper mid-coast region of the state. It was the site of the first port facility built by the Bangor and Aroostook Railroad.

== Fort Point State Park ==
Maine's 120-acre (0.49 km^{2}) Fort Point State Park is located on Fort Point, a smaller peninsula extending eastward from the cape, that includes both the colonial-era Fort Pownall and the Fort Point Light Station.

In 1760, Massachusetts governor Thomas Pownall led the construction of a fort on Cape Jellison, which he named Fort Pownall after himself. It was intended to secure the area for European settlement by driving off the remaining Norridgewock and Penobscot Indians. No battles ever took place at the fort. In 1775, British forces seized the cannons and powder. Later, a regiment of continental soldiers burnt the blockhouse and filled-in most of the ditches to prevent their use by the British.

On the eastern end of Cape Jellison, overlooking the mouth of the Penobscot River, is the Fort Point Light Station. This station was established in 1836 and automated in 1988.
