= John Sibley =

John Sibley may refer to:

- John Langdon Sibley (1804–1885), librarian of Harvard University
- John Sibley (doctor) (1757–1837), American surgeon
- John Churchill Sibley (1858–1938), composer and archbishop
- Arthur 'John' Sibley (1912–1973), American animator
- John A Sibley, leader of the Sibley Commission in Georgia
- John A. Sibley, namesake of the John A. Sibley Horticultural Center in Georgia
