= Joseph and Hannah Maxcy Homestead =

Historic house in Maine, United States

- U.S. National Register of Historic Places
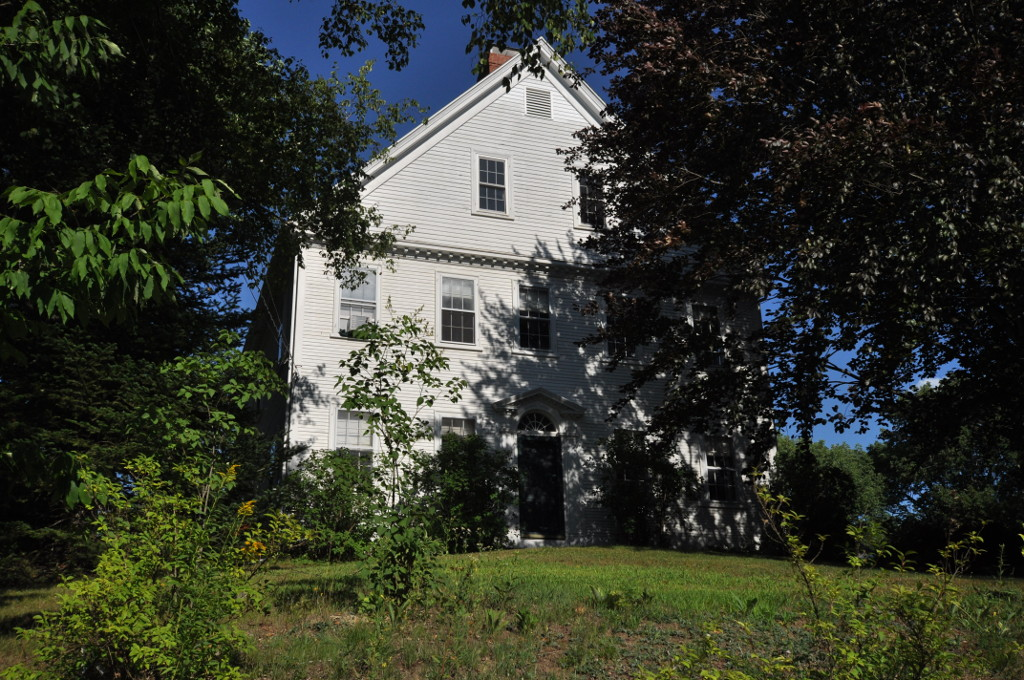

- Location within Maine Location within the United States
- Location: 630 S. Union Rd., Union, Maine
- Coordinates: 44°11′47″N 69°15′50″W
- Area: 10 acres (4.0 ha)
- Built: 1802
- Built by: Alden, Ebenezer
- Architectural style: Federal
- NRHP reference No.: 04000743
- Added to NRHP: July 28, 2004

The Joseph and Hannah Maxcy Homestead is a historic house at 630 South Union Road (Maine State Route 131) in South Union, Maine. Built in 1802 by Ebenezer Alden, a regionally well-known housewright, it is one of the finest period examples of Federal architecture, with high-quality interior woodwork. It was listed on the National Register of Historic Places in 2004.

== Description and history ==
The Maxcy Homestead stands in the rural village of South Union, on the east side of South Main Street nearly opposite its junction with Middle Road. The main block of the house is a fairly large 2 1/2-story wood-frame structure with a gabled roof and clapboard siding. It is nearly square, five bays wide and five bays deep, and has three facades, with center entrances on the north, west, and south sides. The main entrance is on the south-facing facade, and features Doric pilasters flanking the door, and a half-round transom window and gabled pediment above. This treatment closely resembles Plate 40 of William Pain's 1795 The Practical House Carpenter. The interior of the house as virtually intact period woodwork, include fine carvings in all of the downstairs rooms, and slightly less ornate finishes in the upstairs bedrooms.

The house was built in 1802 for Joseph Maxcy, who had moved to the area in 1788 from Attleboro, Massachusetts, as part of a second wave of settlement in the town. The builder was Ebenezer Alden, whose most famous area work was General Henry Knox's Montpelier mansion in Thomaston (destroyed and since reconstructed as a museum). It is probable that Alden used the same carving tools for this house as he did for Montpelier and his own house, built in 1797. Both houses have similar stylistic touches.

== See also ==
- National Register of Historic Places listings in Knox County, Maine
