= Smokey's Greater Shows =

Traveling carnival company in Maine, United States

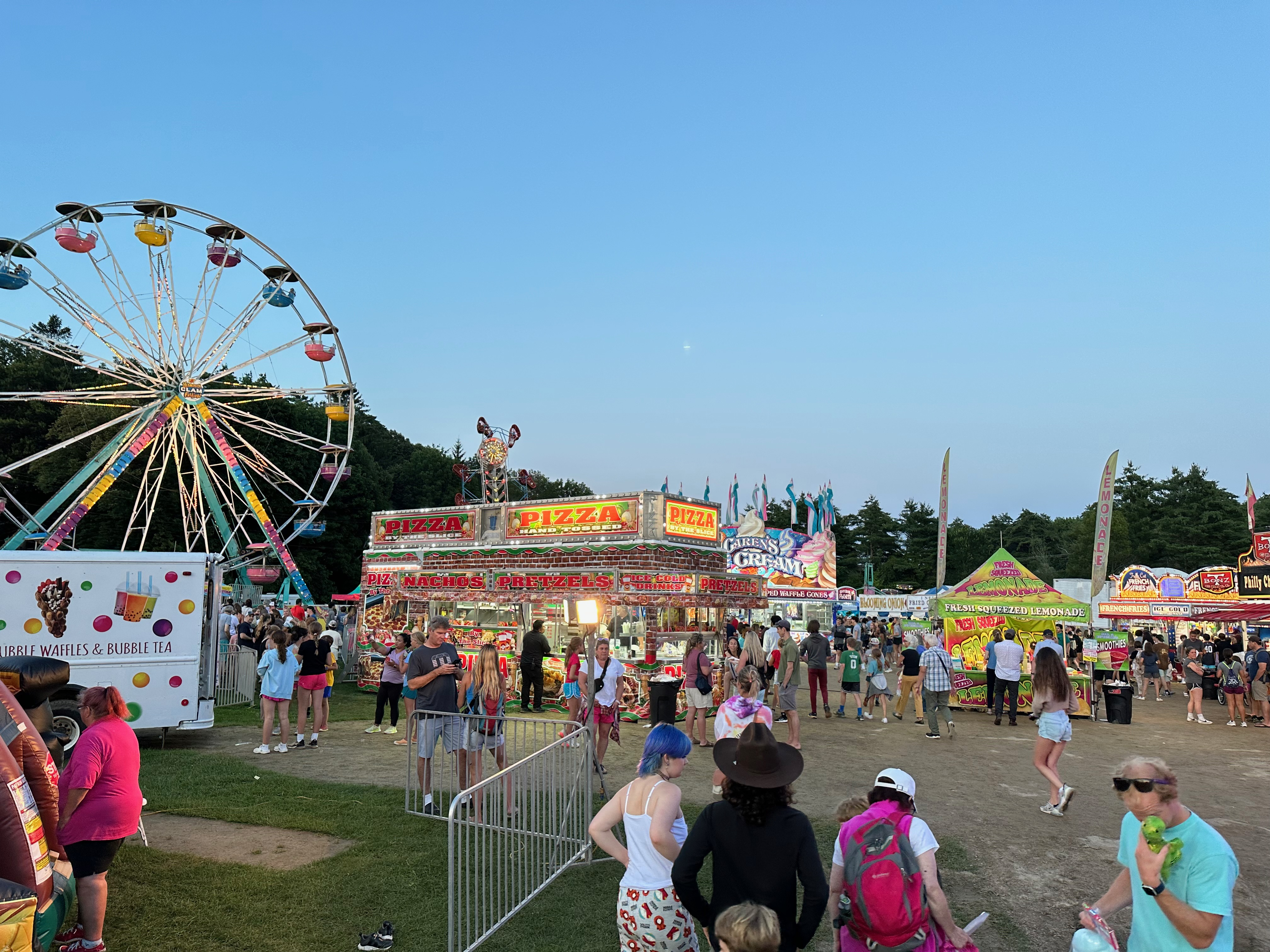
- Smokey's Greater Shows at the 2023 Yarmouth Clam Festival
- Company type: Privately held company
- Industry: Amusement rides
- Founded: 1950s
- Headquarters: Fryeburg, Maine, U.S.
- Key people: Bud Gilmore (former owner); Jeanette Gilmore (current owner); Robby Driskill (manager)
- Products: Amusement ride and traveling carnival management
- Website: https://smokeysgreatershows.com/

Smokey's Greater Shows is a traveling carnival midway company based in Fryeburg, Maine, United States. It provides amusement rides, games and concessions for local, county and state fairs throughout Maine. It appeared at the Fryeburg Fair for over forty years, before its partnership ended in 2022.

Many of its attractions are unique, including its Giant Gondola Wheel and Sky Diver.

The company was founded in Strong, Maine, by Vermont native Roland Gilmore, who was known for his ability to procure free cigarettes out of vending machines. Gilmore's son, George (Bud), took over the business in 1970, after Smokey's death (at which point he realized his father had changed his name from Ronald). George died in 2013, aged 70, at which point his widow, Jeanette, took the reins.

Until the early 21st century, Smokey's Greater Shows served the five northeastern states, but rising fuel costs forced it to reduce its coverage to Maine only.

In 2015, the fire marshal of Waterville, Maine, charged Smokey's over two incidents at the Head of Falls in which three children and an adult were injured.

In 2022, Smokey's signed a multi-year contract with Union Fair, in Union, Maine.
