= Yarmouth Clam Festival =

Coordinates: 43°48′N 70°11.1′W

- Logo of the 2015 festival

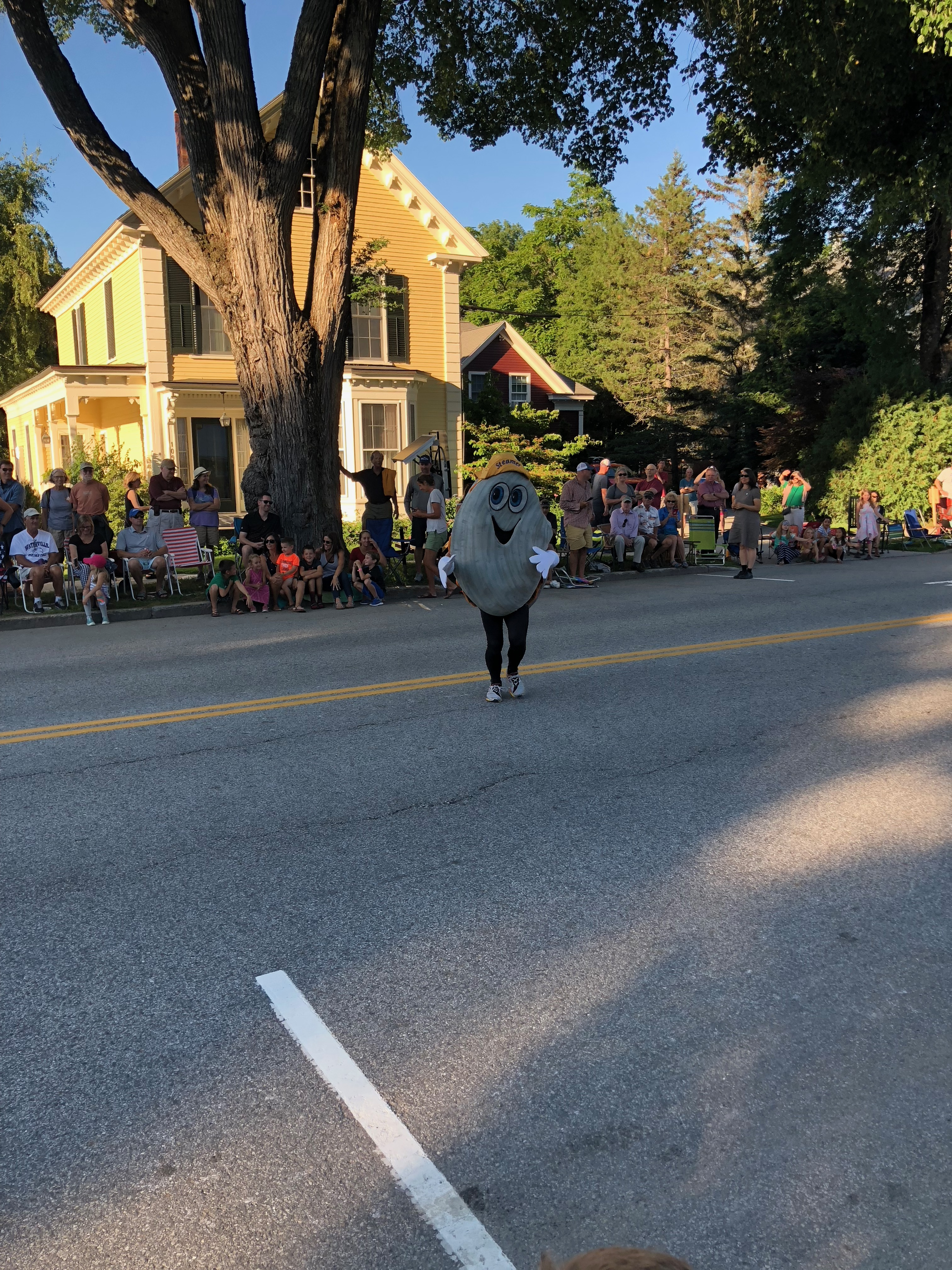
- "Steamer" the clam at the 2018 parade
- Genre: Fundraising
- Dates: Third weekend in July
- Locations: Yarmouth, Maine, U.S.
- Founded: 1965 (61 years ago)
- Website: ClamFestival.com

The Yarmouth Clam Festival is an annual three-day event which takes place in Yarmouth, Maine, starting on the third Friday every July. Established in 1965 as a successor to the town's late-August Old Home Week (itself started in 1911), it is hosted by the Yarmouth Chamber of Commerce, with the aim of raising money for approximately thirty local non-profit organizations, churches, and school groups. The event draws visitors from all over the country. As a result, Yarmouth, a town with a population of around 9,000, accommodates approximately 80,000 people over the course of the weekend. A section of the former population have made it a tradition to stake out their Friday-evening parade viewpoint with a chair several weeks before the event — even as early as May, though this may be in an ironic fashion.

The main festival takes place on either side of the town's Main Street. Booths offering food and drink and items for sale are set up from the First Universalist Church at its south-eastern end to Railroad Park, a mile to the north-west. Over the years, each organization has acquired the right to sell a particular delicacy. Examples include: the Barbershop Harmony Society, who offer Lime Rickeys; the Yarmouth Lions Club (Lemon Lucy slush), the First Parish Church (strawberry shortcakes and various pies); Yarmouth Ski Club (whole fried clams); the Boy Scouts of America (pizza); and various grades of Yarmouth High School offer cheeseburgers, hotdogs, French fries, chicken fingers and soft drinks.

Other events include a parade on the Friday evening; a one-mile fun run (for children aged twelve and under) and a five-mile road race (ages thirteen and over; both on Saturday morning); a People's Muster and a clam-shucking contests (both on Saturday afternoon); a fireworks display (Saturday evening); a diaper derby (Sunday morning); and a professional bicycle-race (Sunday morning). A carnival runs from Wednesday (two days before the official start of the festival) to Sunday, run by Smokey's Greater Shows and held in the grounds of the Rowe School.

Each year, the cover of the festival's program of events is painted by a local artist, featuring a view of the previous year's event.

The festival's official mascot since 2004 has been "Steamer" the clam.

The COVID-19 pandemic forced cancellations of the festival for the first time, in both 2020 and 2021. It returned in 2022, for the 55th edition.

== Gallery ==
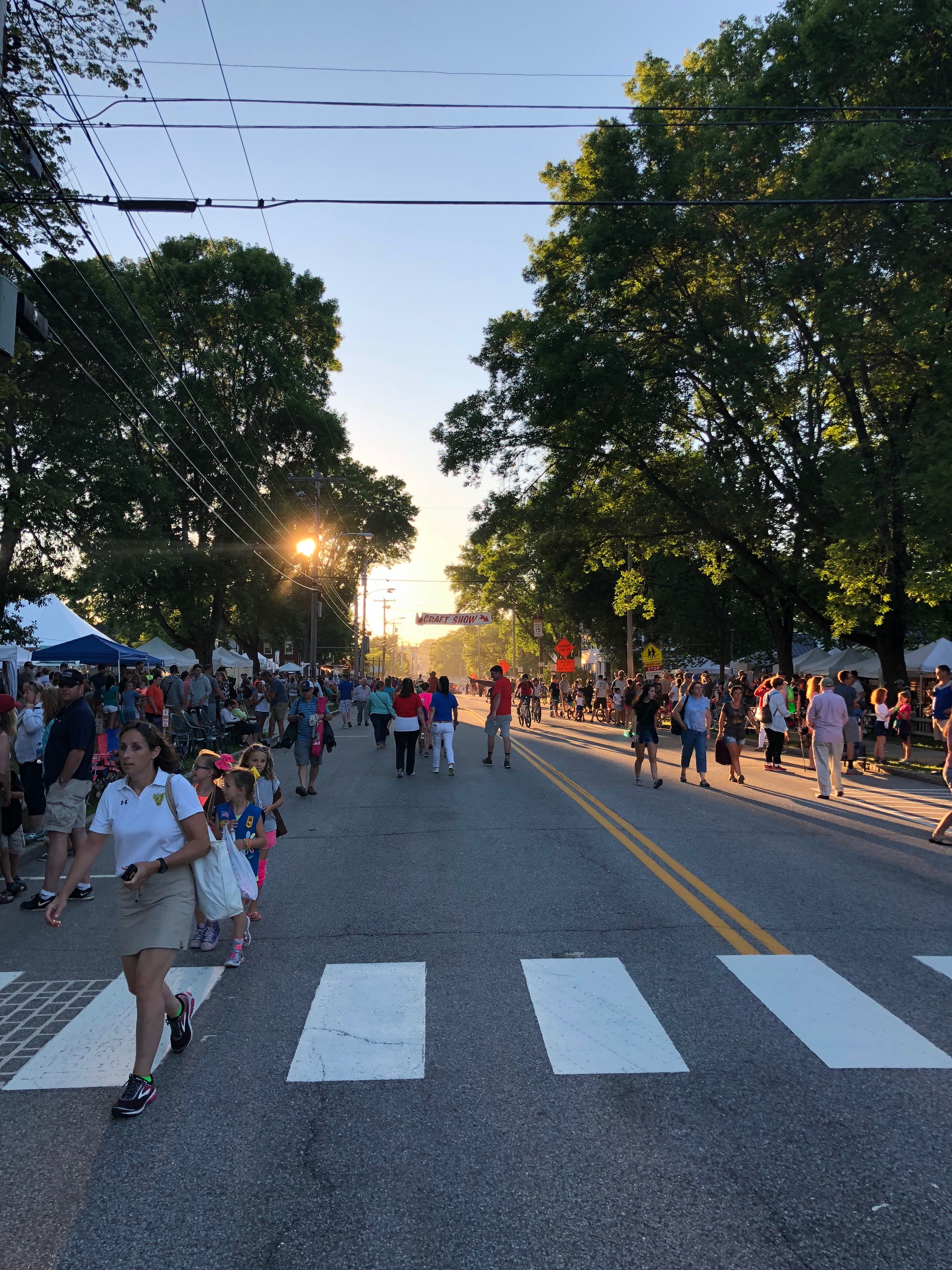
Main Street after the 2018 parade, looking west

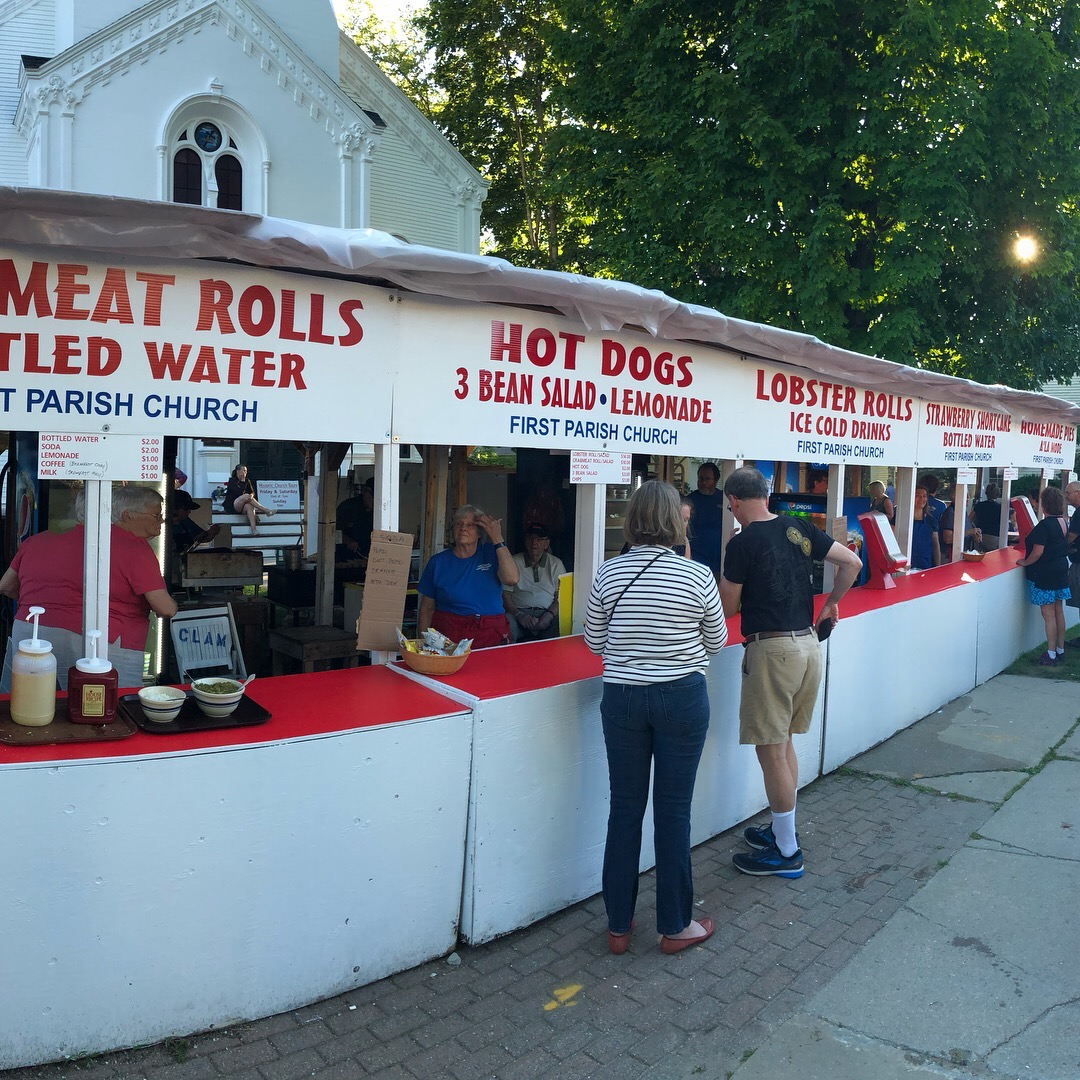
Food stalls at the 2018 festival

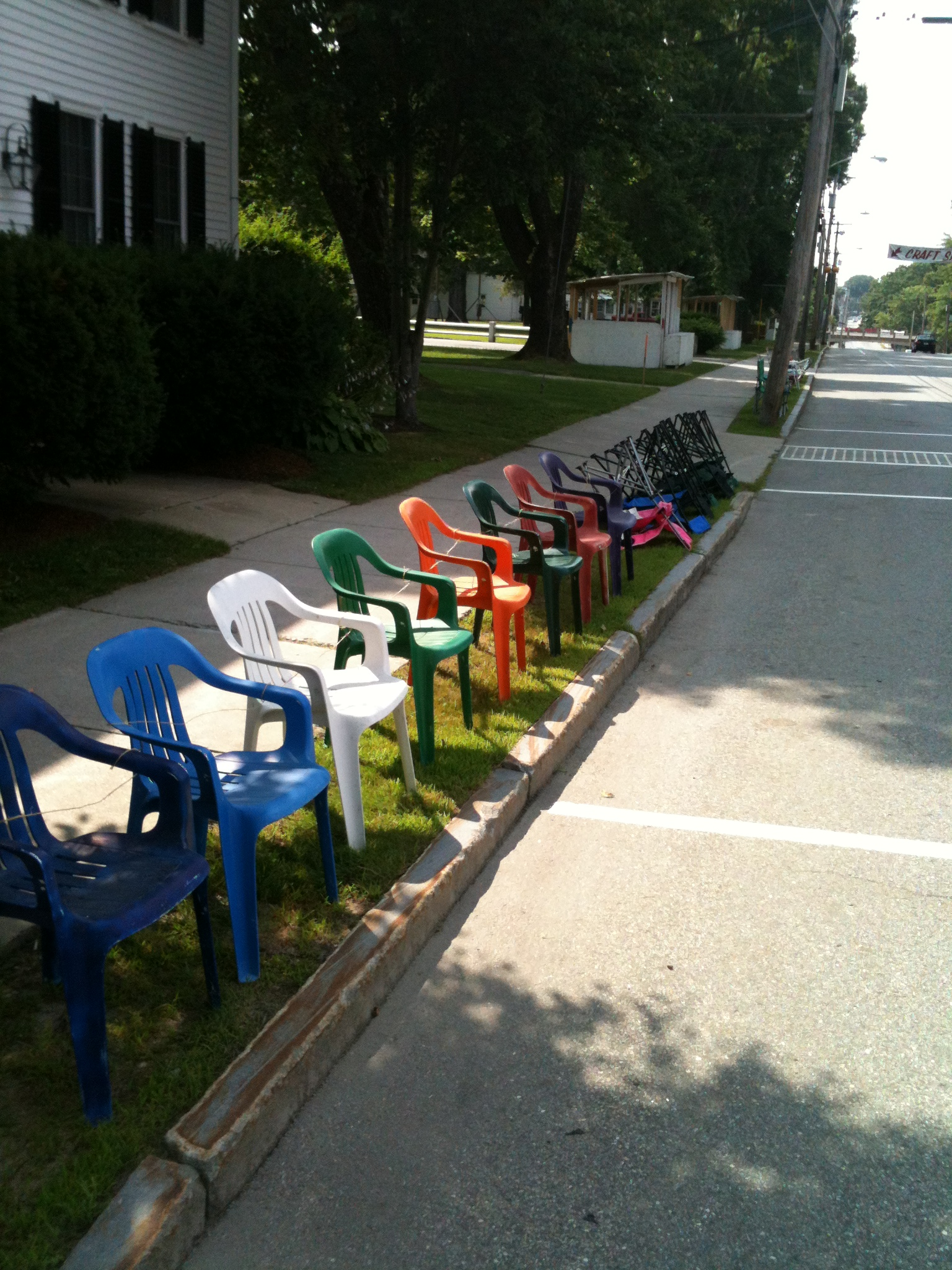
Chairs set out and roped together as people stake their viewing locations for the festival parade

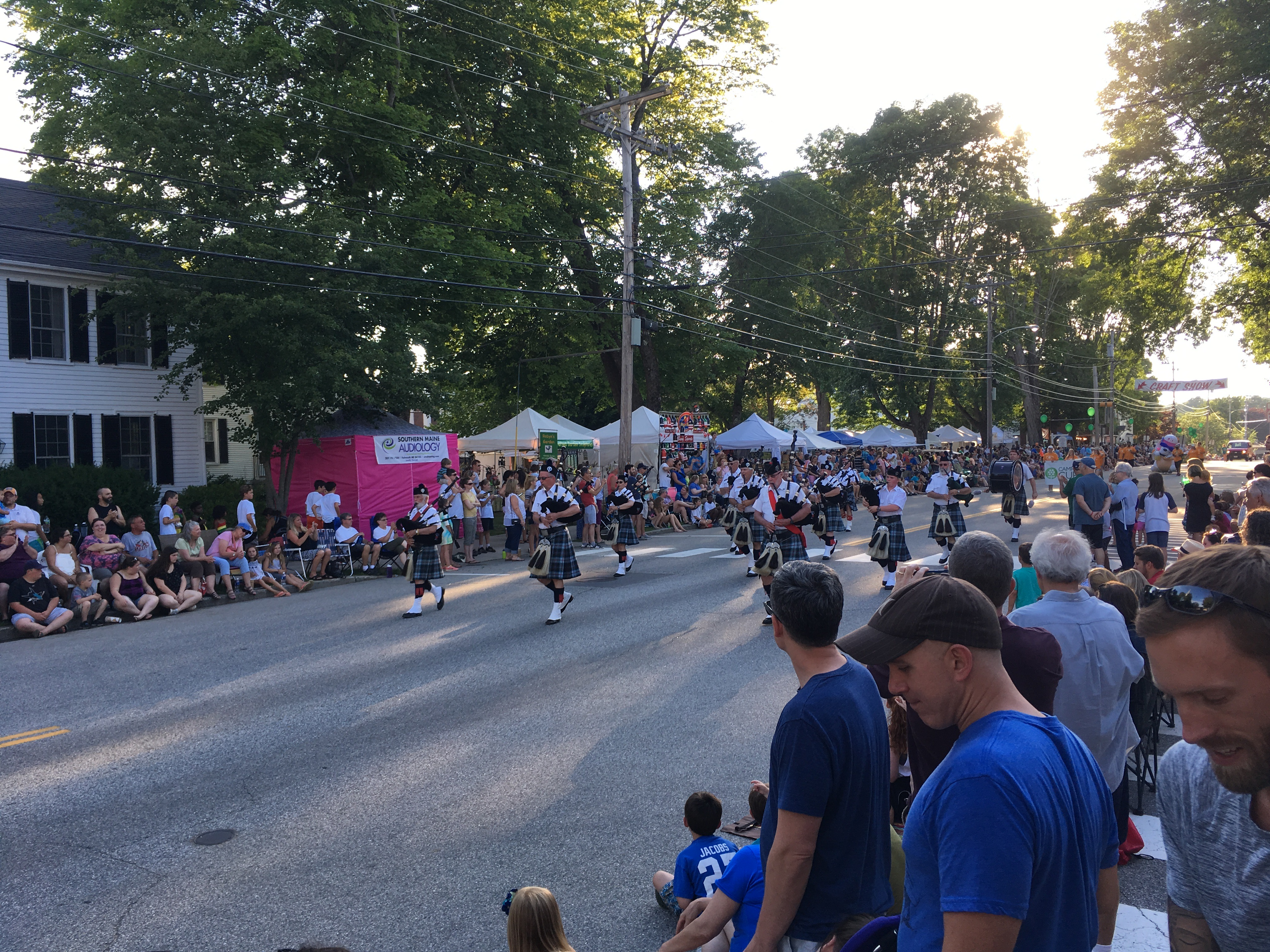
A pipe band partaking in the parade at the 2016 festival

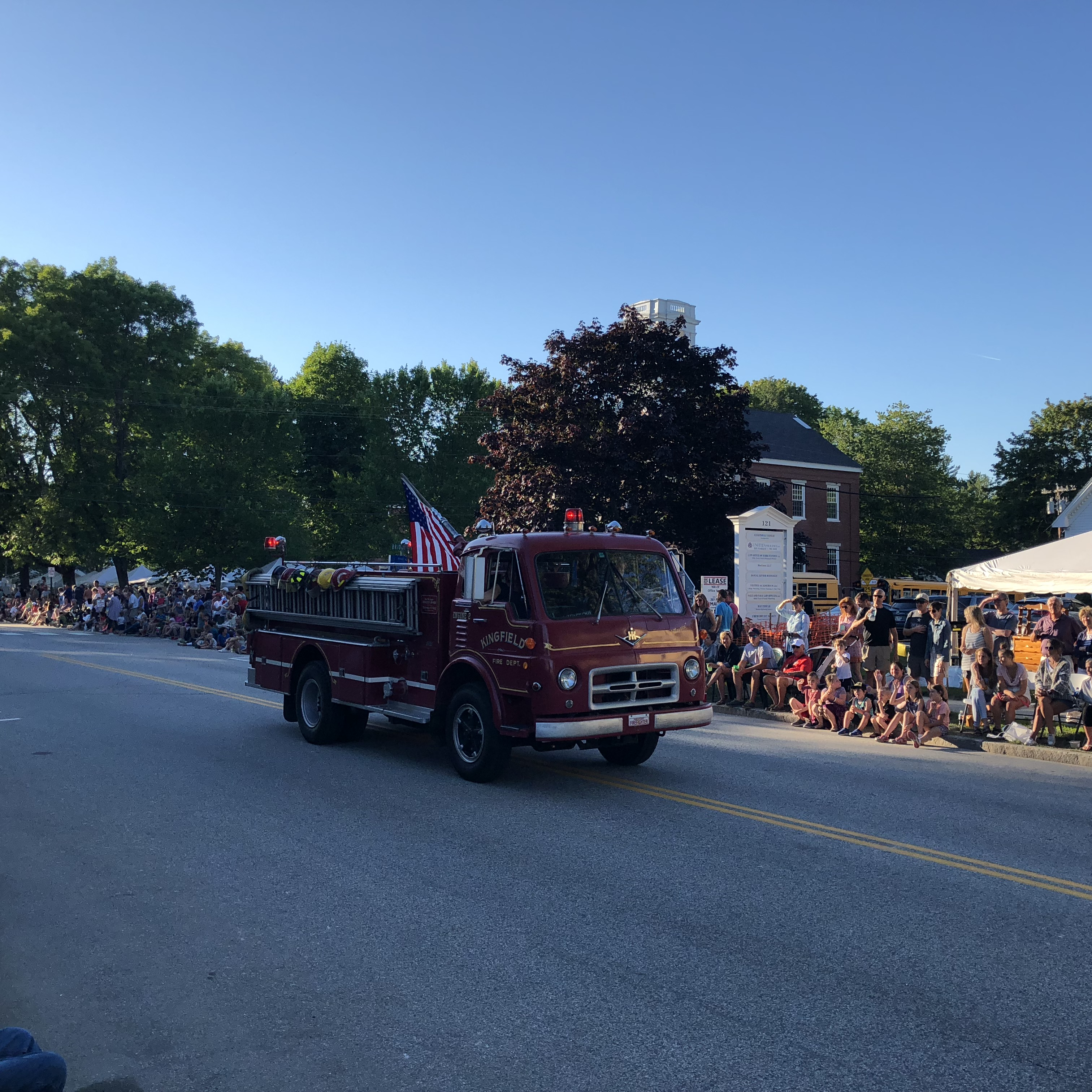
A fire truck in the 2018 parade
