= Fryeburg Fair =

Fair located in Fryeburg, Maine

Coordinates: 44°02′02″N 70°58′12″W

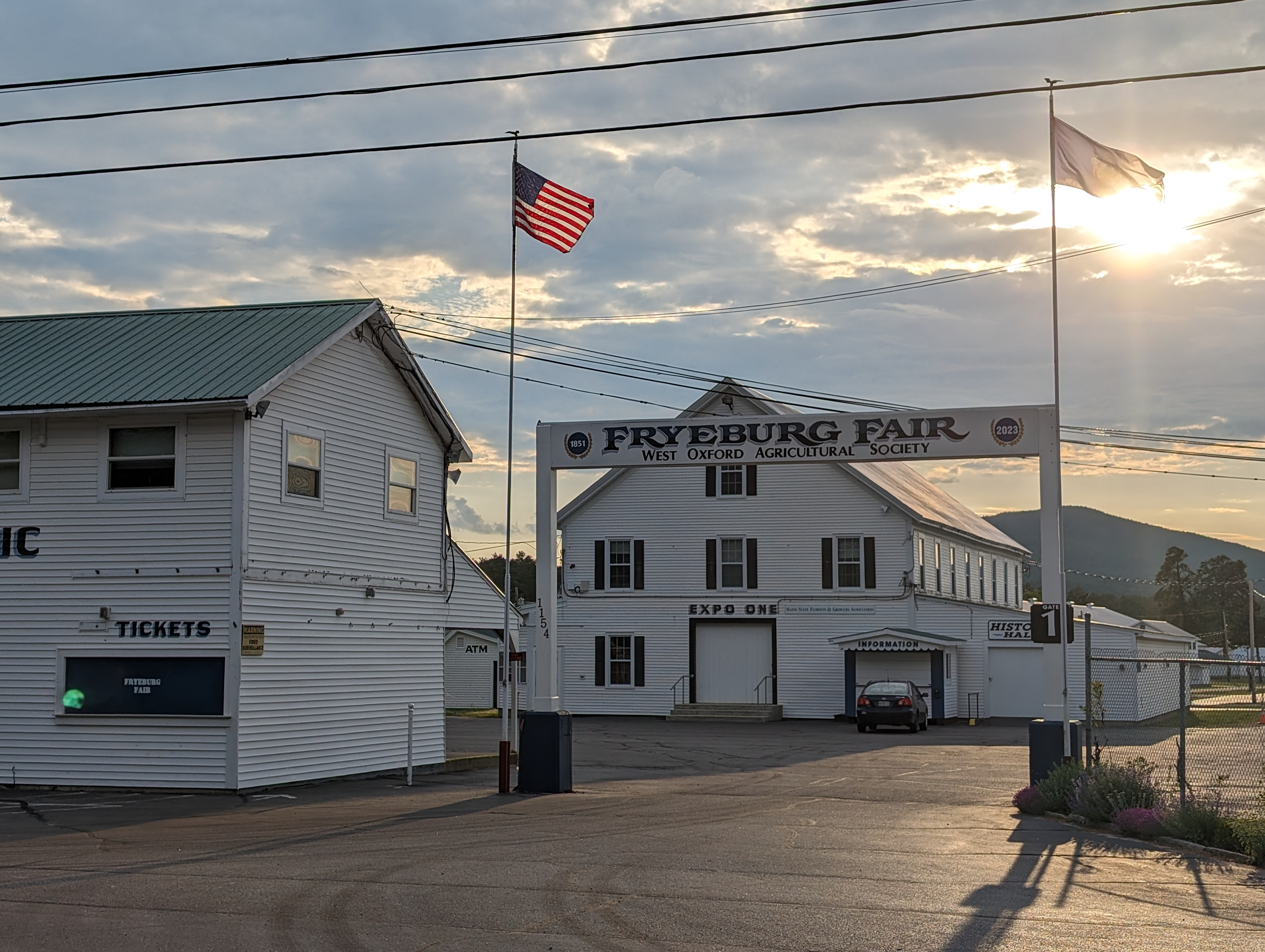
- Main gate of the Fryeburg Fairgrounds, 2024
- Nickname: Maine's Blue Ribbon Classic
- Status: Active
- Genre: Agricultural show
- Frequency: Annual
- Venue: Fryeburg Fairgrounds
- Inaugurated: 1851; 175 years ago
- Attendance: 225,000
- Organiser: West Oxford Agricultural Society
- Website: https://www.fryeburgfair.org

The Fryeburg Fair is a large agricultural Fair held annually in Fryeburg in the U.S. state of Maine. The fair was first held in March 1851, and in subsequent years has grown to become the state's largest agricultural fair. The fair is a 501(c)(3) organization.

The Fryeburg Fair features livestock shows, harness racing, horse pulling, antique farm and forestry equipment displays and demonstrations, horticultural and culinary contests and displays, a petting zoo, agricultural vendor displays, live musical acts, amusement rides, and food stands. The fair, held over an eight-day period in early October, attracted over 175,000+ paid attendees annually.

== History ==
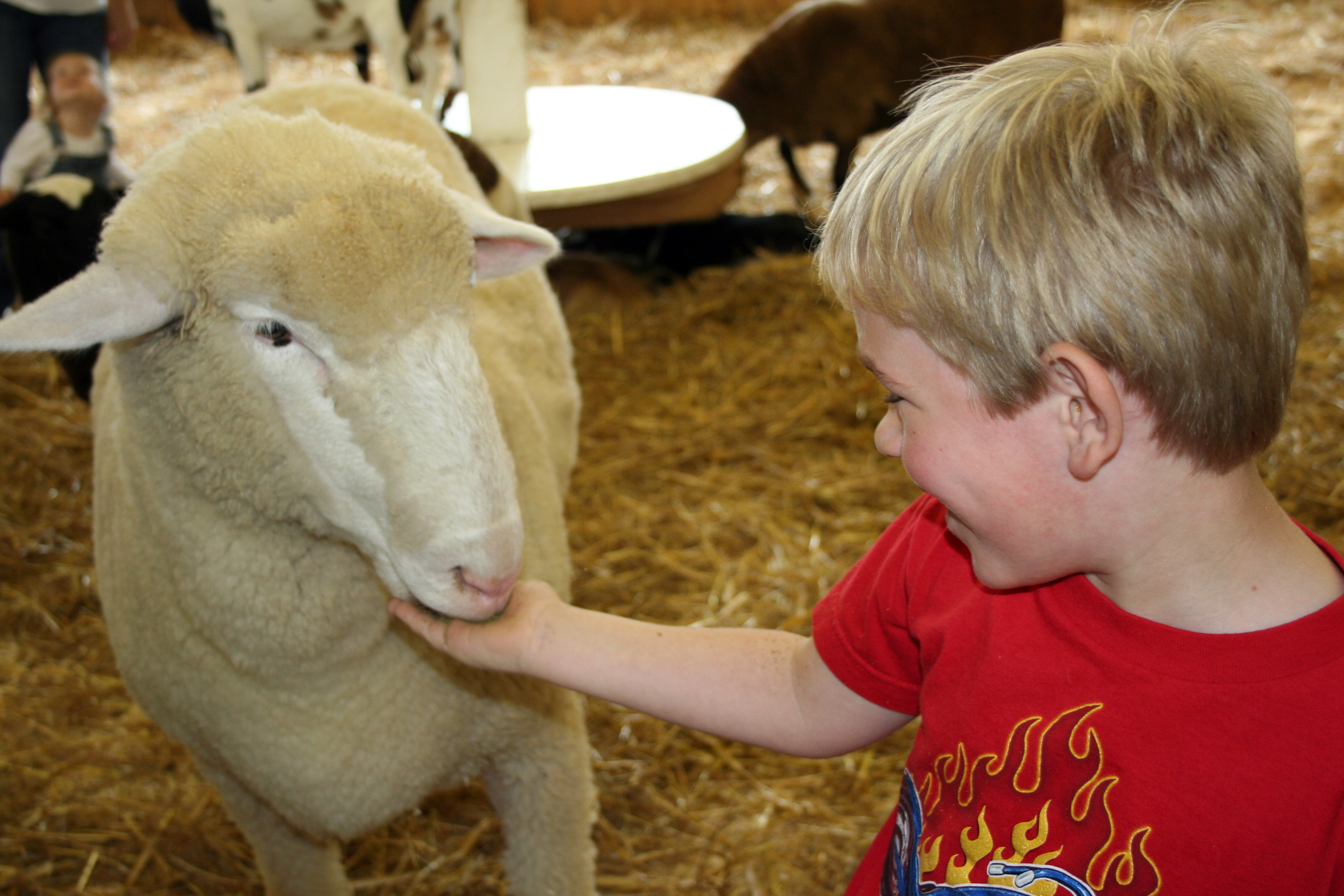
Scene at the Fryeburg Fair

The fair was first organized in 1851 by the West Oxford Agricultural Society, which comprised farmers from ten towns in western Maine. It began in Hiram, Maine in October 1851, and moved between several towns before settling on a location in Fryeburg, eventually locating at its present site in 1885. Around 1888 the Society voted to admit the nearby towns of Conway, NH, Bartlett, NH, Jackson, NH, Chatham, NH and Eaton, NH into their group.

A fire ripped through the sheep and beef cattle barns on July 10, 2018, completely destroying them and damaging 6 others. The fair was still held that year with exhibitors using temporary housing for their animals. New barns were built and used for the 2019 fair.

The fair was held virtually in 2020 due to the COVID-19 pandemic in the United States. In 2021, the fair hosted a vaccination clinic as part of its festivities.

For the Fair's 175th season, they added another day to the fair's schedule. This was opposed by the Cumberland Farmers Club, who operates the nearby Cumberland Fair, as the first day of the Fryeburg Fair now overlapped with the last day of the Cumberland Fair. They claimed the fair did not go through the proper channels to approve the schedule extension. For 2026, the Maine State Commissioner of Agriculture, Conservation and Forestry denied the Fryeburg Fair's request to extend their schedule again to nine days, and the fair's president Dave Hastings announced they would return to its traditional eight-day schedule.

== See also ==
- Smokey's Greater Shows
