= Union Fair =

Annual agricultural fair in Union, Maine

Coordinates: 44°12′49″N 69°17′10″W

The Union Fair is an annual agricultural fair in Union, Maine. It began in 1869 and, since 1886, all fairs in Knox County have taken place in Union.

No fair was held in 1917–18, 1942–45 nor 2020.

For many years the fair started on the third Saturday before Labor Day and run for eight days closing on the following Saturday. The fair now takes place in late July.

== See also ==
- Smokey's Greater Shows
