= John A. Sibley Horticultural Center =

Conservatory at Callaway Gardens in Pine Mountain, Georgia, U.S.

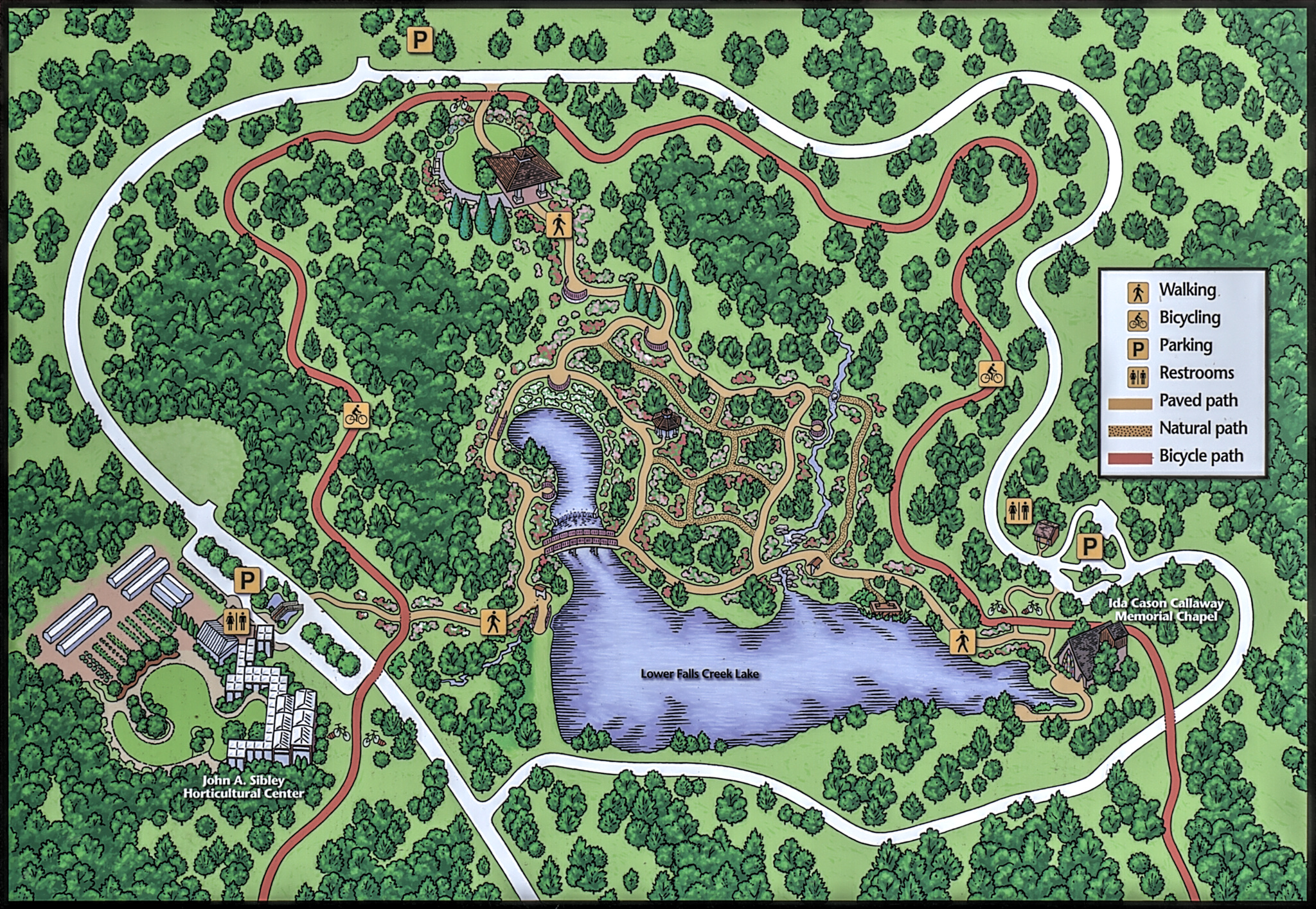
- Map of Sibley Horticultural Center
- Interactive map of John A. Sibley Horticultural Center
- Motto: "an expression of man working in harmony with nature while addressing the needs and wants of both plants and people"
- Nearest city: Columbus, Georgia, United States
- Coordinates: 32.8223°N 84.8648°W
- Area: 5-acre (2.0 ha)
- Opened: March 22, 1984
- Closed: November 12, 2015
- Designer: Robert Marvin
- Owner: Ida Cason Callaway Foundation
- Operator: Callaway Gardens Resort, Inc.
- Visitors: 1,000,000 (in 2006)
- Budget: $300,000/yr
- Facilities: 52,000-square-foot (4,800 m^{2})

John A. Sibley Horticultural Center was a 5-acre (2.0 ha) greenhouse and conservatory within Callaway Gardens located near Pine Mountain in Harris County, Georgia, United States, 18 miles (29 km) from LaGrange, Georgia. Callaway Gardens promoted it as "one of the most advanced garden/greenhouse complexes in the world".

== History ==
The grand opening of the 52,000-square-foot (4,800 m^{2}) John A. Sibley Horticultural Center was March 22, 1984. The center's namesake was a Georgia banker, Callaway Gardens trustee, conservation advocate and friend of the Callaway family. The attraction was originally funded by private donations from people who knew John Sibley. Because the center contained both a 30,000-square-foot (2,800 m^{2}) production greenhouse and a 22,000-square-foot (2,000 m^{2}) top display conservatory, their research, internship and educational programs had a profound impact over 30+ years. Callaway Gardens promoted it as "one of the most advanced garden/greenhouse complexes in the world". The goal of the Sibley Horticultural Center was "an expression of man working in harmony with nature while addressing the needs and wants of both plants and people".

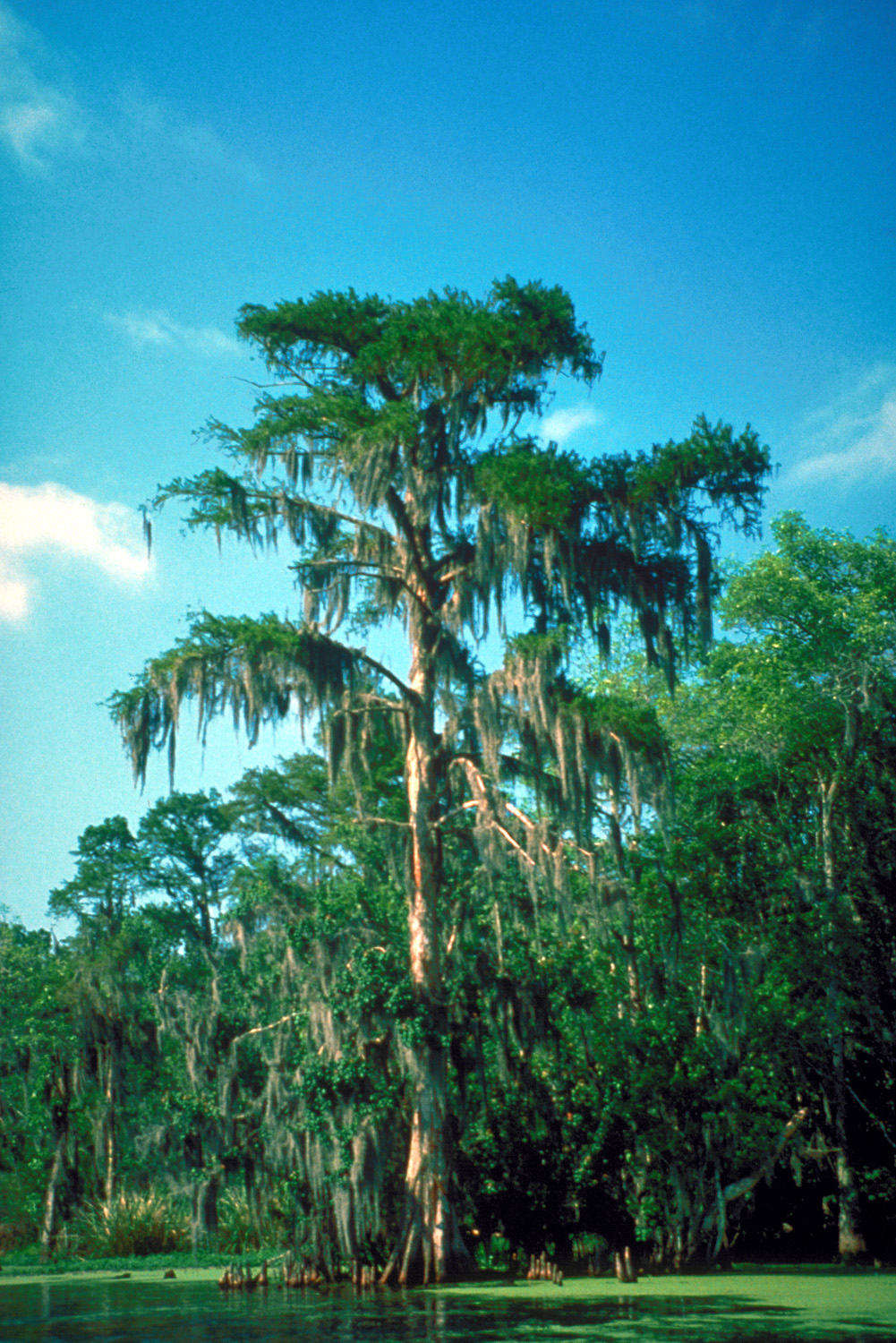
Bald cypress tree

== Dedication ==
The day after the grand opening, Callaway employees dedicated a bald cypress tree to co-founder Virginia Hand Callaway. The gesture originated with and was carried out by employees who collected donations for the gift. The $1,500 tree, which was 35 feet tall and weighed 16,000 pounds, was planted on Arbor Day in 1984. Mrs. Callaway planted numerous bald cypress trees throughout the Gardens. The bald cypress (Taxodium distichum) is native to the coastal plain of the Southeastern United States.

== Facility ==
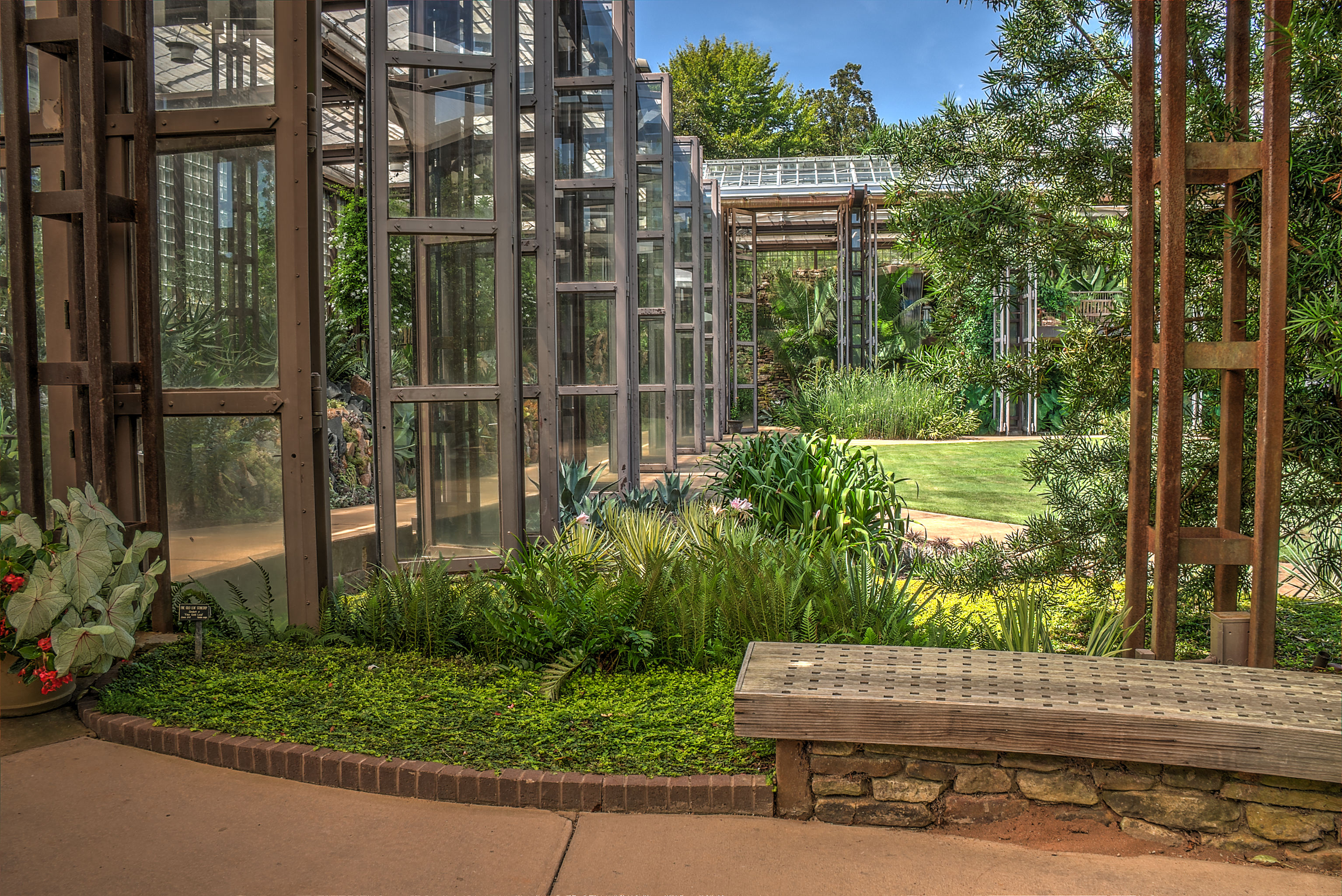
John A. Sibley Horticultural Center showing glass doors open

Architect Kirk R. Craig, FAIA, Craig Gaulden Davis, Inc. of Greenville, South Carolina was principal architect in partnership with Landscape architect Robert Marvin of Walterboro, South Carolina. Craig was known for forward thinking design and Marvin was known for his environmental designs that conserved energy. The building faced south, which combined with critically arranged landscape berms and deciduous plants helped the center stay warm in winter and cool in summer. The featured plants were spring Cymbidium orchids, summer topiary, fall chrysanthemums, and winter poinsettias.

The building was constructed using 7,000 glass blocks and 300 tons of fieldstone from Tennessee. The outdoor and indoor gardens were separated by 26 folding glass doors, 1,600 pounds each and 24' tall. They were designed to be easily closed or opened by staff members. The building's steel structure was reddish-brown in color, a product named Cor-Ten. "Cor" stands for corrosion resistant and "Ten" stands for tensile strength. This steel alloy oxidizes to a predictable depth which makes it perfect for outdoor construction. Cason Callaway was on the board for the U.S. Steel Corporation, which developed Cor-Ten in 1940.

== Conservatories ==
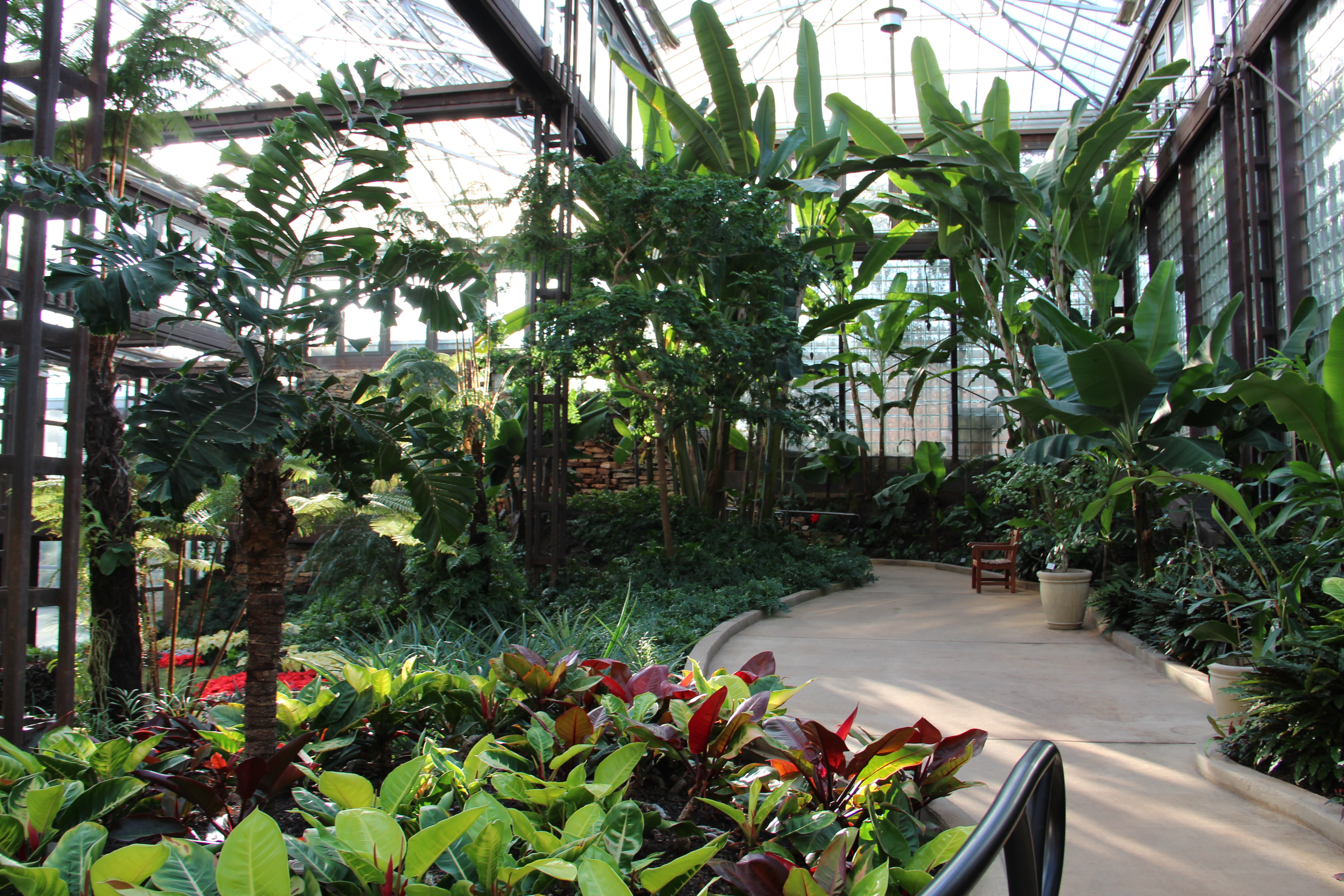
Inside the Sibley Horticultural Center

The garden-and-greenhouse occupied 5 acres (2.0 ha) which contained both exotic and native plants. Greenhouse sections included the main conservatory, a tropical conservatory, a sculpture garden with the "Dove of Peace" carrara marble sculpture, a fern grotto, a sub-Mediterranean conservatory and an outdoor garden. "Partners in Time" is a 22-foot indoor waterfall, over which 350 gallons of water flowed per minute. Indoor displays were changed eight times each year and bronze sculptures added to the visitor's experience.

== Gardens ==
Outdoor displays changed five times per year to complement the permanent plants in the garden.

== Renovation ==
Landscape designer W. Gary Smith led the $3.5 million renovation in 2003. The existing Rock Wall Garden area was transformed into a Mediterranean Garden. Mediterranean climates have long, hot summers with little rainfall, and with our planets' changing climate, their ability to survive may provide lessons for the future.

== Notice of Closing ==
Before the center closed, Jason Horne filed a petition with Change.org asking Callaway Gardens to reconsider. The petition had 1,389 supporters and prompted an official response. As of April 2022, no additional plans had been announced.

Callaway Gardens President & CEO William Doyle wrote a response on November 9, 2015, three days before the center closed. Doyle commented, "the 'online' plea to keep the Sibley Center open is appreciated but will not result in a change of decision for 2016. The Sibley Center is in need of a multi-million dollar renovation and requires hundreds of thousands of dollars a year to operate, we cannot operate this facility in its current condition and financial requirements." Horne and others commented that they believe that shutting down Sibley and Mr. Cason's Garden was "contrary" to the Callaway's goal of making people aware of the environment and providing environmental education. “It seems to me at the rate they’re going, there won’t be any gardens in Callaway Gardens somewhere down the road not too far,” Horne said. “They’re going to be left with nothing but just another golf resort.”

The facility was permanently closed on November 12, 2015.

== Gallery ==
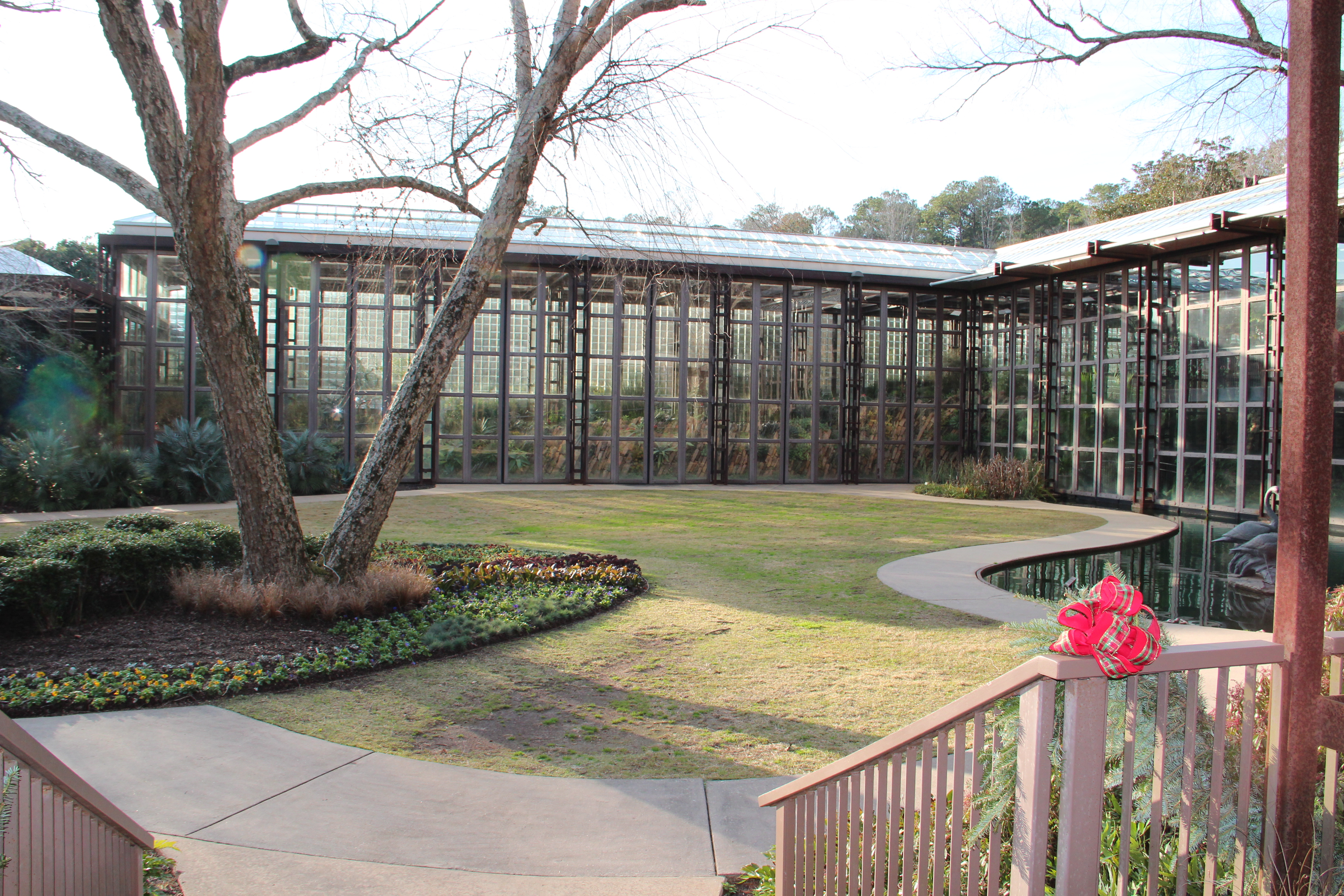
John A. Sibley Horticultural Center

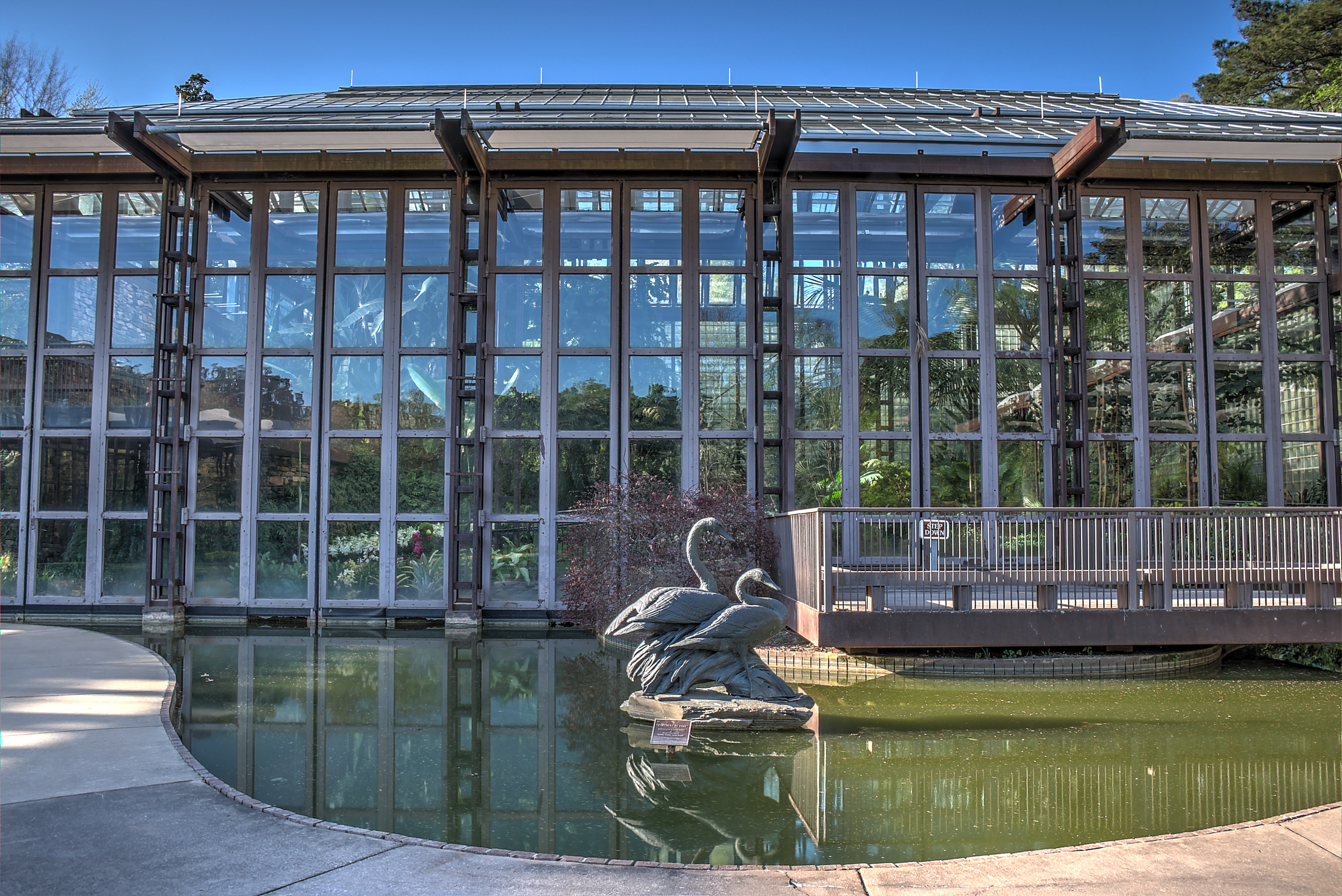

== See also ==
- List of botanical gardens in the United States
