= John Langdon Sibley =

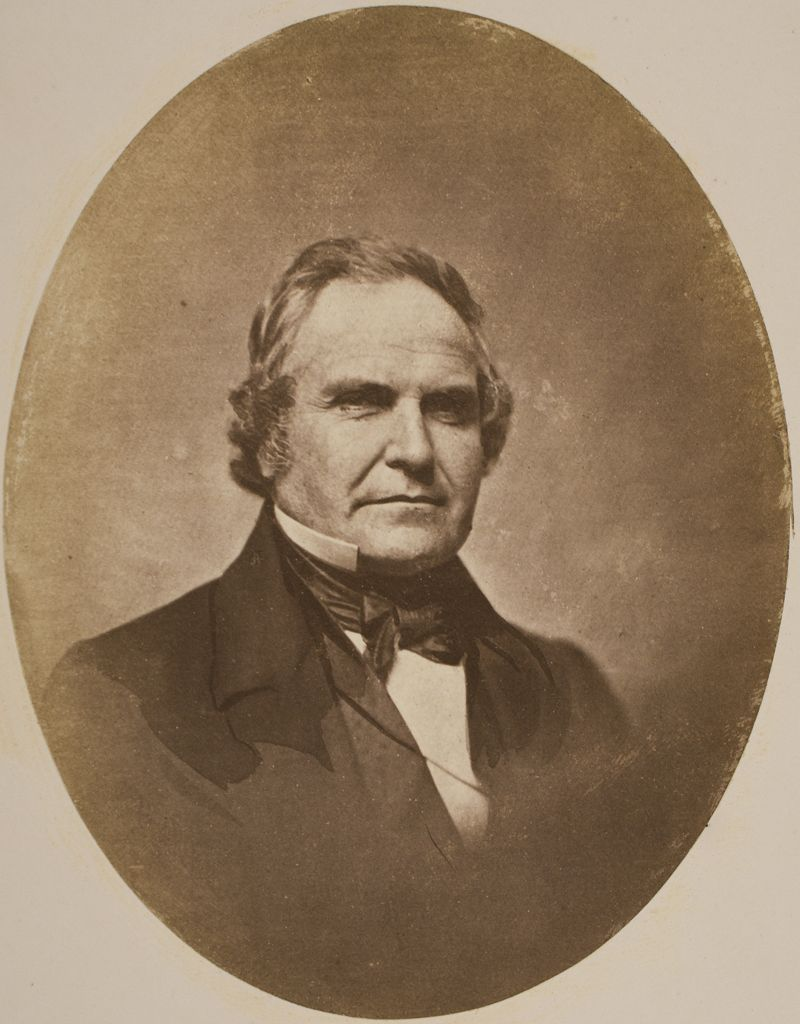
- Sibley photographed by John Adams Whipple, c. 1858
- Born: December 29, 1804; Union, District of Maine
- Died: December 9, 1885 (aged 80); Cambridge, Massachusetts
- Education: Phillips Exeter Academy; Harvard College; Harvard Divinity School
- Occupation: Librarian
- Spouse: Charlotte Augusta Langdon Cook

Signature
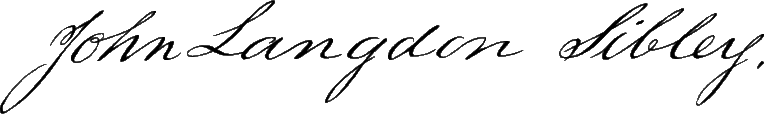

John Langdon Sibley (December 29, 1804 – December 9, 1885) was the librarian of Harvard University from 1856 to 1877.

== Biography ==
John Langdon Sibley was born in Union, Maine on December 29, 1804, the son of Dr. Jonathan Sibley and his wife, née Persis Morse. He prepared at Phillips Exeter Academy, received his undergraduate education at Harvard and then studied at Harvard Divinity School. From 1829-1833 he was a pastor in Stow, Massachusetts. He then went to Cambridge, Massachusetts where he worked as a magazine editor. When Harvard's first purpose-built library building, Gore Hall, was opened in 1841, he was appointed the assistant librarian under Thaddeus William Harris. In 1856, when Harris died, Sibley became the librarian of Harvard.

On May 30, 1866, Sibley married Charlotte Augusta Langdon Cook, at Sommerville, Massachusetts.

Sibley oversaw both the physical and fiscal expansion of the Harvard Library. He also compiled the initial volumes of Sibley's Harvard Graduates series (three volumes published between 1873 and 1885 covering the classes of 1642 to 1689) and bequeathed funds to the Massachusetts Historical Society for continuation of this project. This task was undertaken by Clifford K. Shipton who covered the classes of 1690 to 1771 in 14 volumes from 1932 to 1975, and in 1999 an 18th volume appeared covering classes from 1772 to 1774. (Note: From about 1800 until 1900 Harvard published Class Books, then switched to Yearbooks; beginning from the class of 1833 to the present, Harvard also publishes Class Anniversary autobiographical accounts.)

Sibley died at his home in Cambridge on December 9, 1885.
