= Union, Maine =

Town in Maine, United States

- Town
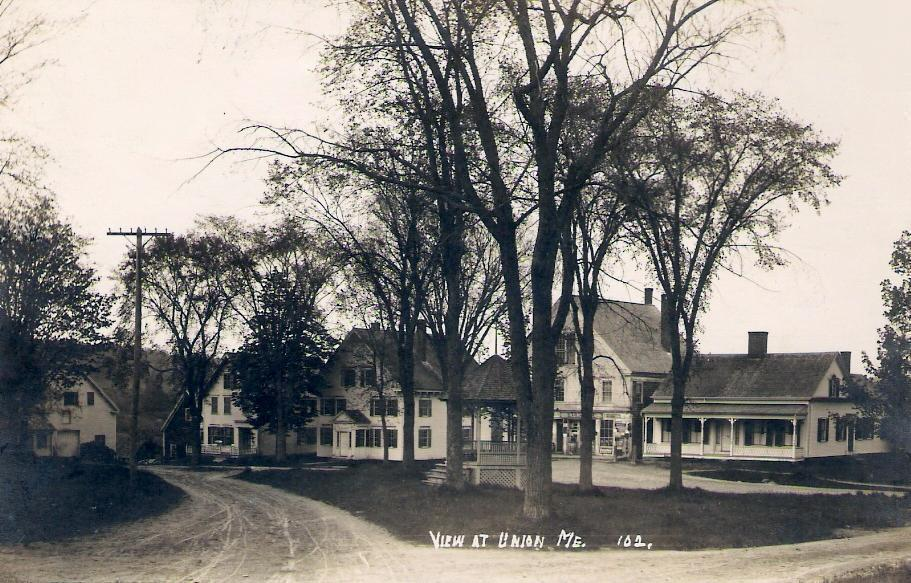
- Union Common in 1915

- Seal

- Location in Knox County and the state of Maine.
- Coordinates: 44°13′50″N 69°16′23″W
- Country: United States
- State: Maine
- County: Knox
- Incorporated: 1786
- Villages: Union; East Union; North Union; South Union

Area
  - Total: 34.49 sq mi (89.33 km^{2})
  - Land: 32.15 sq mi (83.27 km^{2})
  - Water: 2.34 sq mi (6.06 km^{2})
- Elevation: 121 ft (37 m)

Population (2020)
  - Total: 2,383
  - Density: 74/sq mi (28.6/km^{2})
- Time zone: UTC−5 (Eastern (EST))
  - Summer (DST): UTC−4 (EDT)
- ZIP Code: 04862
- Area code: 207
- FIPS code: 23-78115
- GNIS feature ID: 582772
- Website: www.union.maine.gov

Union is a town in Knox County, Maine, United States. The population was 2,383 at the 2020 census. Union is home to the Matthews Museum of Maine Heritage as well as the annual Union agricultural fair.

== History ==
Union was part of a tract of land called the Muscongus Patent, a grant made March 2, 1629, by the Plymouth Council to John Beauchamp and Thomas Leverett. About 1720, it was purchased by General Samuel Waldo of Boston and thereafter called the Waldo Patent. The first white settlers by the names of Anderson, Malcolm, and Crawford, arrived in 1772. The town was settled on July 19, 1774, and named Taylor Town after the original purchaser and settler, Dr. John Taylor from Lunenburg, Massachusetts. Dr. John Taylor purchased Union for £1,000. On May 3, 1786, it was organized as the Plantation of Sterlingtown, and on October 20, 1786, the town was incorporated and named Union. Washington was formed from a portion of Union in 1811.

Agriculture was the principal business, and on October 5, 1869, the North Knox Agricultural & Horticultural Society opened the first annual Union Fair. The town had mills operated by water power at the outlets of ponds. Factories at Union produced carriages, cultivators, leather, harness, boots and shoes. South Union had a cabinet and musical instrument factory, an iron foundry, a machine shop and a coffin factory. East Union had a lumbermill, in addition to a chair and table factory.

A war memorial was dedicated at the common on July 4, 1888. When Union celebrated on July 19, 1974, the bicentennial of its settlement, a time capsule was buried near the statue, to be dug up July 19, 2024. The capsule contains a picture of children from around the town and "scores of current memorabilia." Union was the subject of the 1940 historical novel, Come Spring, by author Ben Ames Williams.

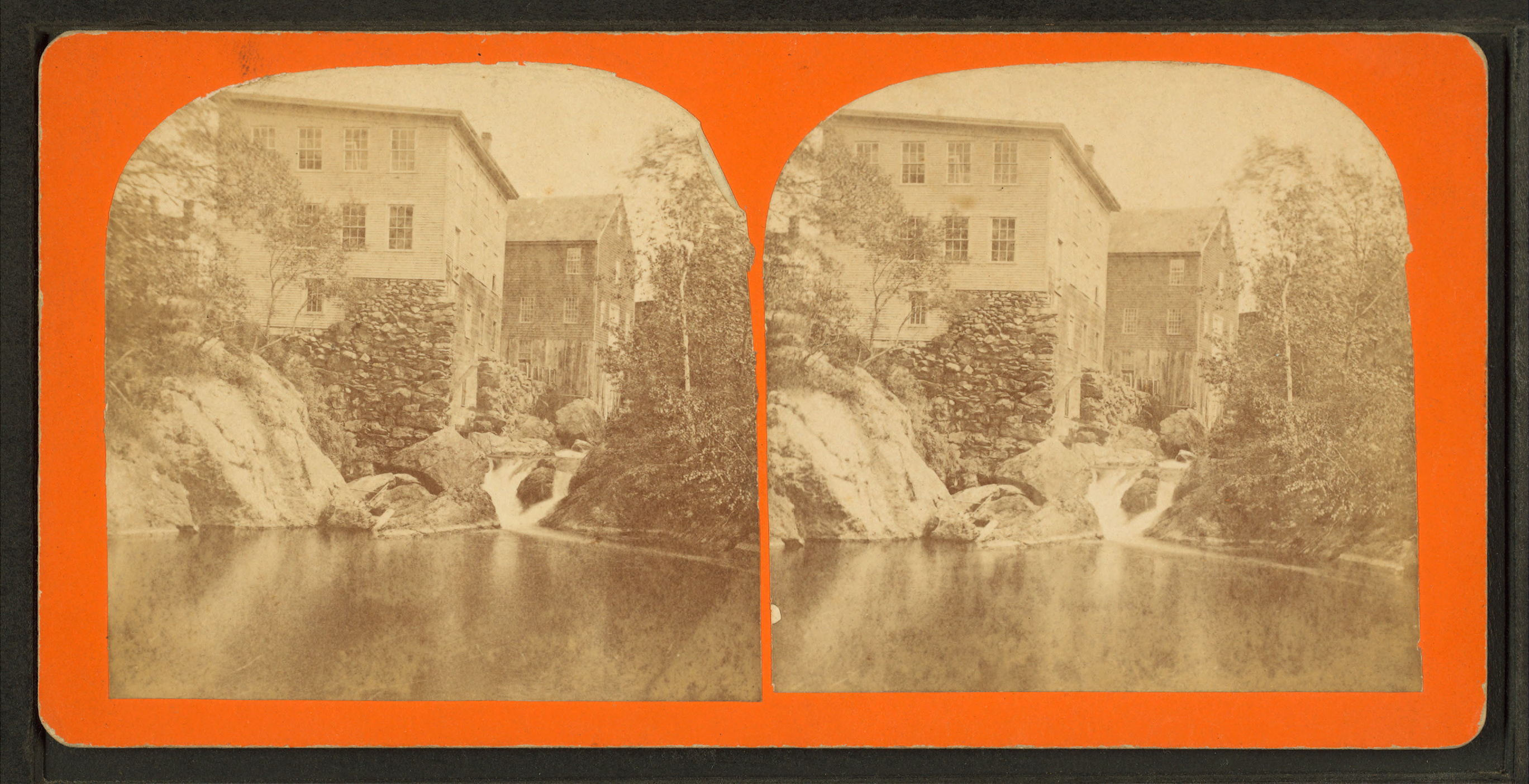
South Union falls c. 1880

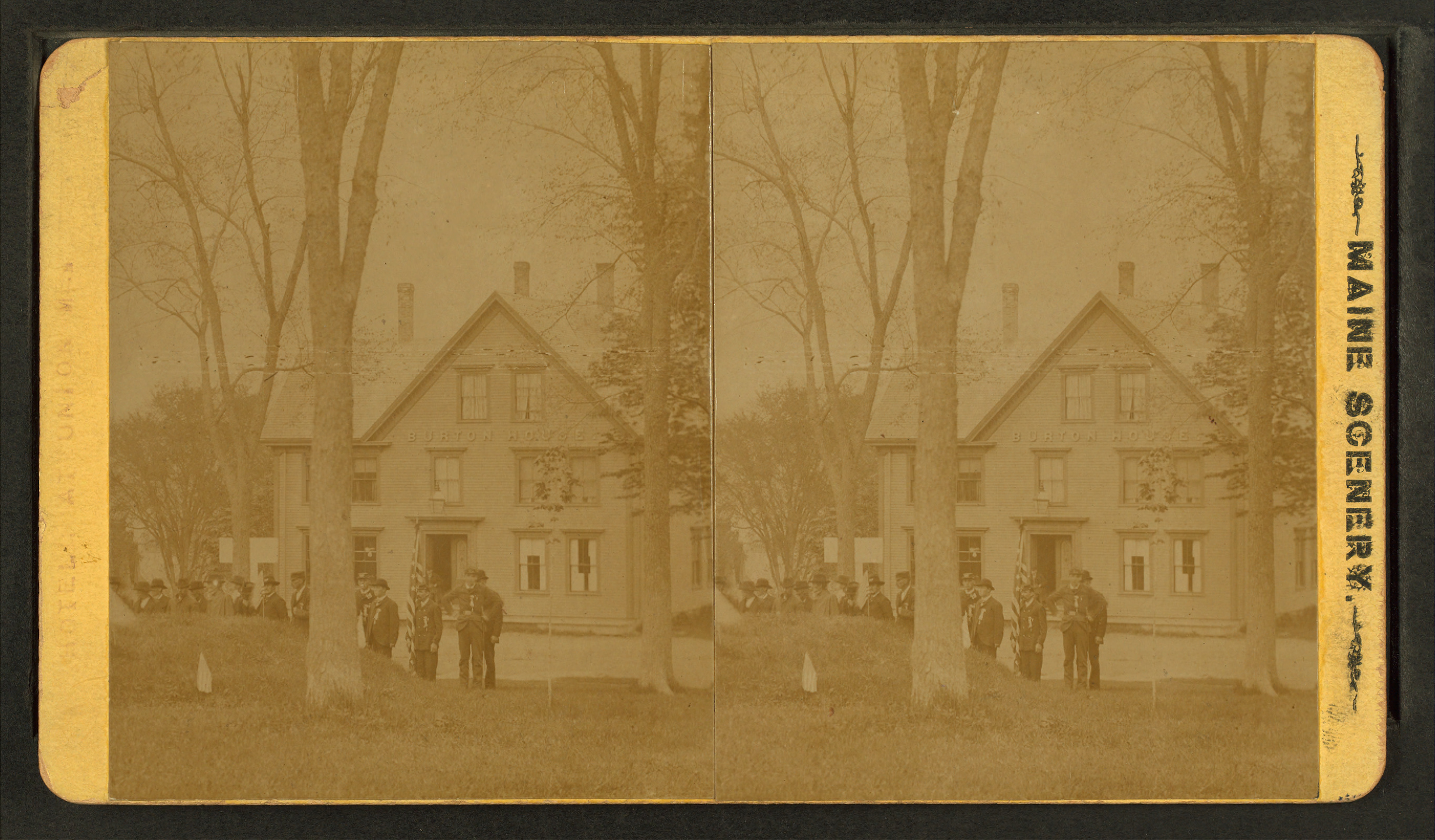
The Burton House c. 1880

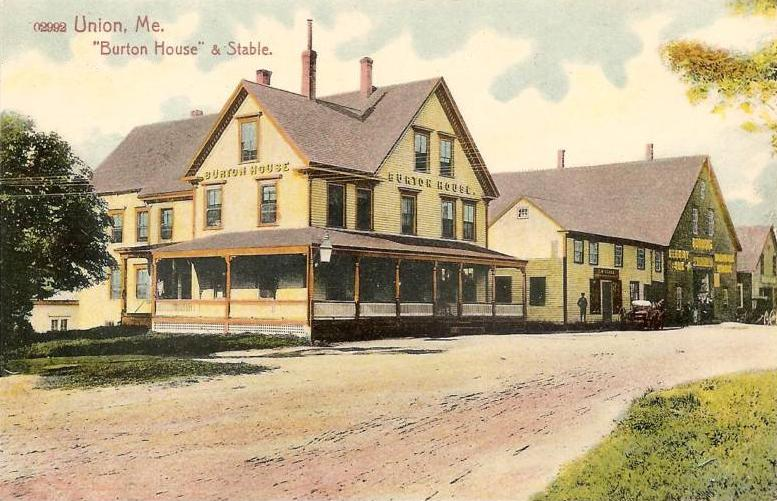
The Burton House in 1907

== Geography ==
According to the United States Census Bureau, the town has a total area of 34.49 square miles (89.33 km^{2}), of which 32.15 square miles (83.27 km^{2}) is land and 2.34 square miles (6.06 km^{2}) is water. Union is drained by the Medomak River, St. George River, Pettengill Stream, Fuller Brook, Hope Brook, Little Medomak Brook and the Back River. Coggans Hill, elevation 817 feet (249 meters) above sea level, is the highest point in the town.

== Education ==
Union is part of the Maine School Administrative District 40. Union Elementary School is in the town, with the MSAD headquarters and Rivers Alternative Middle School within the school building's second floor.

Medomak Valley Middle School and Medomak Valley High School are in nearby Waldoboro.

Vose Library is in Union.

== Demographics ==
Historical population
Census	Pop.	Note	%±
1790	199		—
1800	573		187.9%
1810	1,266		120.9%
1820	1,391		9.9%
1830	1,612		15.9%
1840	1,784		10.7%
1850	1,972		10.5%
1860	1,957		−0.8%
1870	1,701		−13.1%
1880	1,548		−9.0%
1890	1,436		−7.2%
1900	1,248		−13.1%
1910	1,233		−1.2%
1920	1,133		−8.1%
1930	1,060		−6.4%
1940	1,150		8.5%
1950	1,085		−5.7%
1960	1,196		10.2%
1970	1,189		−0.6%
1980	1,569		32.0%
1990	1,989		26.8%
2000	2,209		11.1%
2010	2,259		2.3%
2020	2,383		5.5%
U.S. Decennial Census

=== 2010 census ===
As of the census of 2010, there were 2,259 people, 981 households, and 638 families residing in the town. The population density was 70.3 inhabitants per square mile (27.1/km^{2}). There were 1,203 housing units at an average density of 37.4 per square mile (14.4/km^{2}). The racial makeup of the town was 98.7% White, 0.3% African American, 0.4% Native American, and 0.6% from two or more races. Hispanic or Latino of any race were 0.4% of the population.

There were 981 households, of which 25.6% had children under the age of 18 living with them, 53.8% were married couples living together, 7.7% had a female householder with no husband present, 3.5% had a male householder with no wife present, and 35.0% were non-families. 27.2% of all households were made up of individuals, and 11.4% had someone living alone who was 65 years of age or older. The average household size was 2.30 and the average family size was 2.77.

The median age in the town was 46.5 years. 19.7% of residents were under the age of 18; 6% were between the ages of 18 and 24; 22.4% were from 25 to 44; 35.6% were from 45 to 64; and 16.4% were 65 years of age or older. The gender makeup of the town was 49.0% male and 51.0% female.

=== 2000 census ===
As of the census of 2000, there were 2,209 people, 863 households, and 632 families residing in the town. The population density was 68.8 inhabitants per square mile (26.6/km^{2}). There were 1,052 housing units at an average density of 32.8 per square mile (12.7/km^{2}). The racial makeup of the town was 98.64% White, 0.09% African American, 0.23% Native American, 0.23% Asian, and 0.81% from two or more races. Hispanic or Latino of any race were 0.27% of the population.

There were 863 households, out of which 31.9% had children under the age of 18 living with them, 59.2% were married couples living together, 9.5% had a female householder with no husband present, and 26.7% were non-families. 20.2% of all households were made up of individuals, and 6.6% had someone living alone who was 65 years of age or older. The average household size was 2.51 and the average family size was 2.85.

In the town, the age distribution of the population shows 24.6% under the age of 18, 6.0% from 18 to 24, 28.2% from 25 to 44, 27.8% from 45 to 64, and 13.4% who were 65 years of age or older. The median age was 40 years. For every 100 females, there were 95.3 males. For every 100 females age 18 and over, there were 92.8 males.

The median income for a household in the town was $37,679, and the median income for a family was $41,050. Males had a median income of $30,984 versus $23,438 for females. The per capita income for the town was $16,240. About 6.1% of families and 9.6% of the population were below the poverty line, including 8.3% of those under age 18 and 5.5% of those age 65 or over.

== Sites of interest ==
National Register of Historic Places:

- Ebenezer Alden House
- The Common
- Lermond Mill
- Joseph and Hannah Maxcy Homestead
- Union Town House
- Matthews Museum

== Notable people ==
- Obadiah Gardner, US senator
- Christine Savage, state legislator
- John Langdon Sibley, librarian of Harvard University from 1856 to 1877
- Augustin Thompson, physician and businessman who created Moxie
