= Ebenezer Alden House =

Historic house in Maine, United States

- U.S. National Register of Historic Places
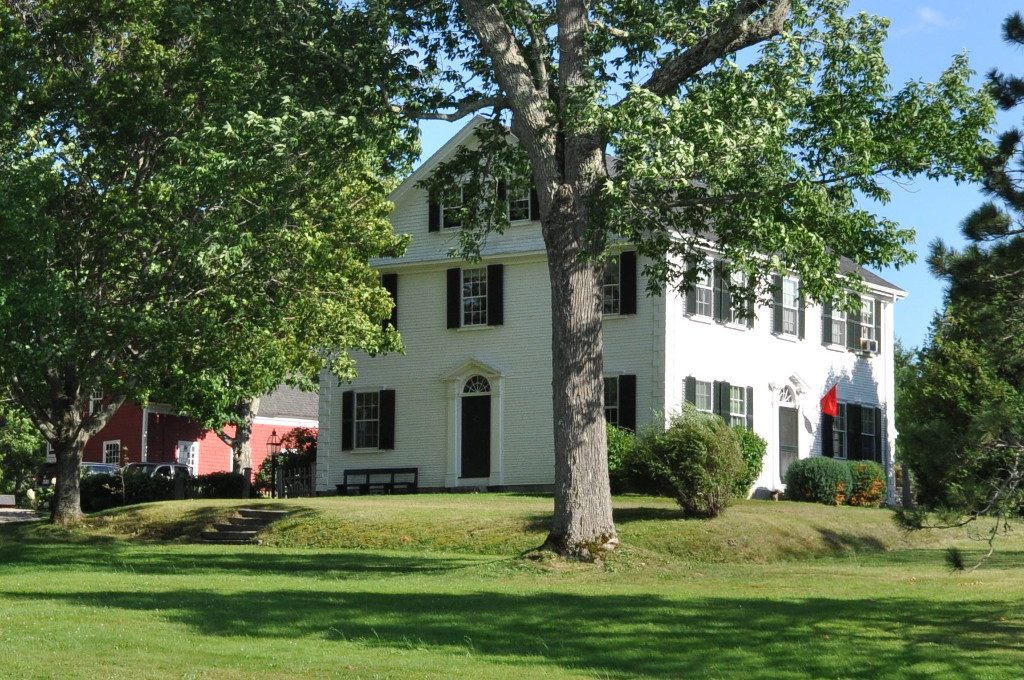

- Location within Maine Location within the United States
- Location: Common Rd., off ME 131, Union, Maine
- Coordinates: 44°12′44″N 69°16′3″W
- Area: 2 acres (0.81 ha)
- Built: 1797
- Architect: Ebenezer Alden
- Architectural style: Federal
- NRHP reference No.: 75000100
- Added to NRHP: April 28, 1975

The Ebenezer Alden House is a historic house on Common Street in Union, Maine, United States. Built in 1797, it is an unusually high quality and high style Federal period in an area that was very much a frontier at the time. It was added to the National Register of Historic Places in 1975.

== Description and history ==
The Alden House stands on the south side of Common Road, a short way west of its junction with Maine State Route 131 in the center of the rural community of Union. It is a 2 1/2-story brick-and-wood-frame structure, with a side gable roof, and clapboarded sides with quoined corners. A single-story shed-roof addition and 1 1/2-story ell extend from its east side. It has three principal facades with entrances at their centers. Two of them have surrounds of pilasters topped by half-round transoms and gabled pediments, while the third has an entablature and flat cornice. Windows are sash throughout, and the end gables are pedimented. The interior of the house features high-quality carved woodwork, executed by the builder and owner, master carver Ebenezer Alden.

The house was built by Alden in 1797, when Union (settled in 1774) was little more than a frontier settlement. Its designs appear to be based in part on plans from plate 40 of William Pain's Practical House Carpenter, published in 1794. Other design elements may have been derived from Alden's work on Montpelier, the mansion of General Henry Knox in nearby Thomaston. It is said that General Knox was dining here in 1806 when he swallowed a chicken bone, leading to infection and his eventual death.

The house remained in the hands of Alden's descendants until 1965.

== See also ==
- National Register of Historic Places listings in Knox County, Maine
